= New York State Route 195 =

Former highway in New York

New York State Route 195
- Map of Franklin and St. Lawrence counties with NY 195 highlighted in red

Route information
- Maintained by NYSDOT
- Length: 6.20 mi (9.98 km)
- Existed: c. 1938–April 10, 1980

Major junctions
- South end: NY 11B in Lawrence
- North end: US 11 in Lawrence

Location
- Country: United States
- State: New York
- Counties: St. Lawrence

Highway system
- New York Highways; Interstate; US; State; Reference; Parkways
← NY 194	→ NY 196

New York State Route 195 (NY 195) was a 6.20-mile (9.98 km) long north–south state highway located within the town of Lawrence in St. Lawrence County, New York, in the United States. The southern terminus of the route was at NY 11B in the hamlet of Nicholville. Its northern terminus was at U.S. Route 11 (US 11) in the community of Lawrenceville. NY 195 was located in an extremely rural portion of the county and had only three intermediary intersections with other through traffic roads.

NY 195 was first a piece of the former Route 30, a legislative route designated by the state in 1908. The route was replaced in 1924, by NY 2, the first set of signed state routes in New York, with a bypassed section near Lawrenceville being designated as NY 2A about two years later. NY 2 and NY 2A were decommissioned in 1927 for US 11, leaving the route unnumbered for a few years. In the 1930 state highway renumbering, the Nicholville–Lawrenceville route was designated as NY 11B. By 1938, NY 11B was realigned to Malone, and the route was replaced by NY 195. The route was officially decommissioned by the New York State Department of Transportation on April 10, 1980, but the route remained under state control for two more years, until September 1, 1982, when the alignment was turned over to St. Lawrence County and designated as County Route 55 (CR 55) and County Route 54 (CR 54).

== Route description ==
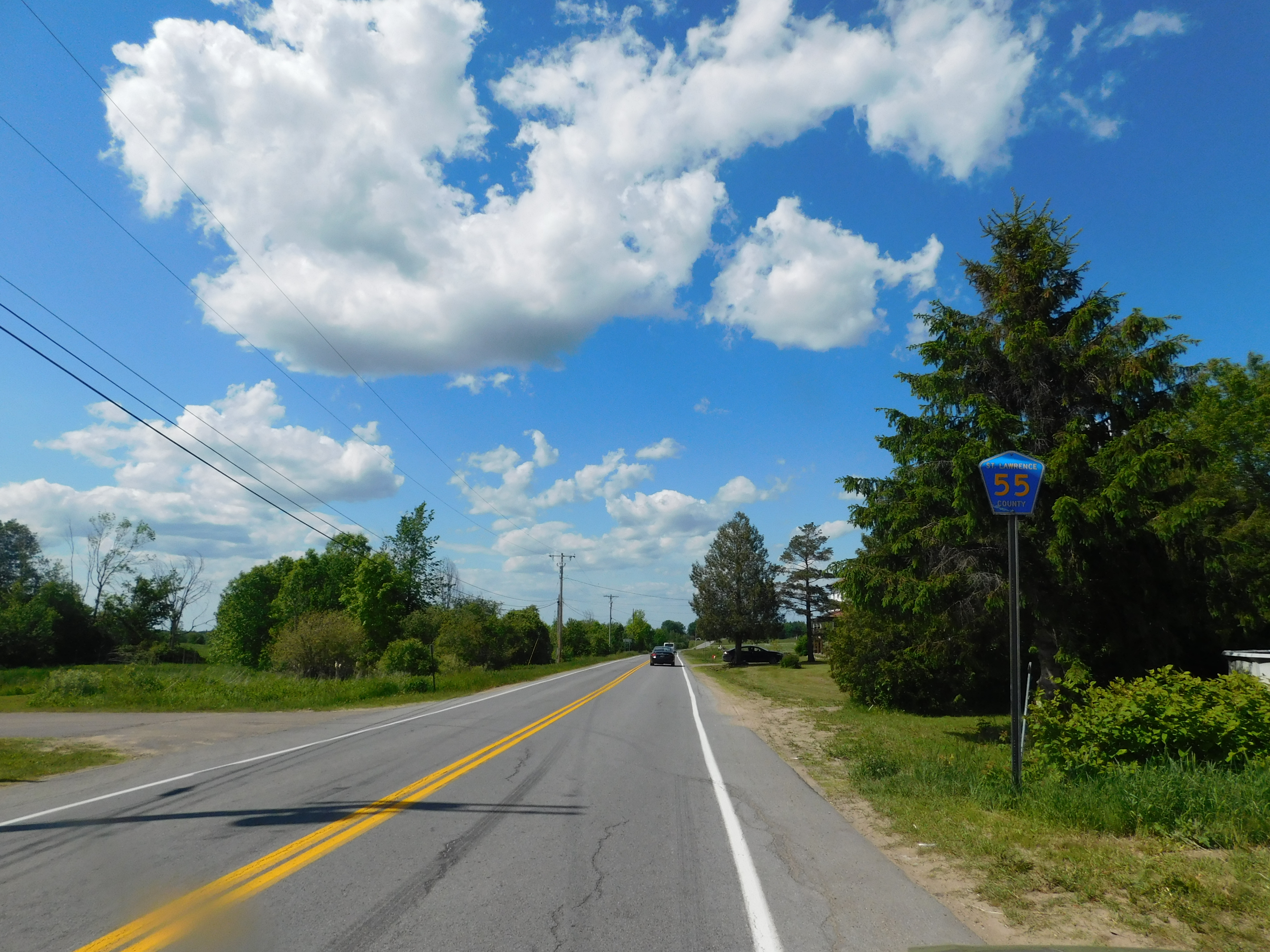
Signage along CR 55, a former alignment of NY 195, in Nicholville

NY 195 began at an intersection with NY 11B in the hamlet of Nicholville within the town of Lawrence. It headed north out of the community and into a series of cultivated fields. About quarter of the way between Nicholville and Lavery's Corner, the fields gave way to forested areas, which themselves ceded to more fields near an intersection with Cady Road. NY 195 continued on to Lavery's Corner, where it intersected with a pair of county highways and turned east toward Lawrenceville. On its way to Lawrenceville, the highway met Ferris Road, the last through route along NY 195's routing excluding the roadway at its northern terminus. East of Ferris Road, NY 195 curved northeast to enter Lawrenceville, where it ended at US 11.

== History ==
In 1908, the New York State Legislature created Route 30, an unsigned legislative route extending from Niagara Falls to Rouses Point via Maple View, Potsdam and Lawrenceville. Route 30 followed what is now NY 11B east from Potsdam to Nicholville, where it turned north to follow modern County Route 55 (CR 55) and CR 54 to Lawrenceville. When the first set of posted routes in New York were assigned in 1924, NY 2 was assigned to most of legislative Route 30 between Maple View and Rouses Point. The lone exception was from Potsdam to Lawrenceville, where NY 2 followed a more northerly alignment via Winthrop and North Lawrence. The bypassed section of legislative Route 30 between Potsdam and Lawrenceville was designated as NY 2A by 1926.

The Nicholville–Lawrenceville segment of NY 2A was concurrent with NY 56, another route assigned in the mid-1920s that extended from Massena in the northwest to Meacham Lake in the southeast via Winthrop and Saint Regis Falls. When NY 2 was redesignated as US 11 in 1927, the NY 2A designation was eliminated and replaced with a realigned NY 56 from Potsdam to Nicholville. The Nicholville–Lawrenceville roadway was left unnumbered until the 1930 renumbering of state highways in New York when it was designated as NY 11B. The designation was extended west to Potsdam by the following year. NY 11B was rerouted c. 1938 to continue east from Nicholville to Malone while its former routing north of Nicholville was designated as NY 195.

NY 195 remained unchanged up to April 10, 1980, when the designation was officially removed from the route. However, the highway remained under state jurisdiction until September 1, 1982, when ownership and maintenance of NY 195's former routing was transferred from the state of New York to St. Lawrence County as part of a larger highway maintenance swap between the two levels of government. The alignment that NY 195 once followed is now part of CR 55 from Nicholville to Lavery's Corner and part of CR 54 from Lavery's Corner to Lawrenceville.

== Major intersections ==
The entire route was in Lawrence, St. Lawrence County.

mi	km	Destinations	Notes
0.00	0.00	NY 11B	Southern terminus; hamlet of Nicholville
6.20	9.98	US 11	Northern terminus; hamlet of Lawrenceville
1.000 mi = 1.609 km; 1.000 km = 0.621 mi
