= Debar Mountain Wild Forest =

Coordinates: 44.5821538°N 74.2259863°W

The Debar Mountain Wild Forest is a 83,405-acre (337.53 km^{2}) tract designated as Wild Forest by the New York State Department of Environmental Conservation in the northeastern Adirondack Park, just north of Paul Smiths, in Franklin County. The area includes 61,500 acres (249 km^{2}) of state land and 60,600 acres (245 km^{2}) of conservation easement land. The area is served by state routes NY-3, NY-30 and NY-458.

Activities supported include hiking, cross country skiing, snowshoeing, horse back riding, mountain biking, snowmobiling, hunting, fishing, canoeing and boating. Debar Mountain, at 3,305 feet (1,007 m), offers a broad distant view of the Adirondack High Peaks to the south; Azure Mountain and Debar Meadows are other popular destinations. There are 22 miles (35 km) of mountain bike trails, 16 miles (26 km) of snowmobile trails, 13 miles (21 km) of cross country ski trails, eight miles (13 km) of horseback riding trails, and two miles (3.2 km) of canoe carry trails.

Car camping is available at Meacham Lake and Buck Pond Campgrounds. There are also 21 remote campsites and four lean-tos. Other bodies of water include the St. Regis River, Osgood Pond, Jones Pond, Deer River Flow, Mountain Pond, and Lake Kushaqua.

== See also ==
- List of New York wild forests
