= Saint Regis Falls Central School =

School district in the U.S. state of New York

Coordinates: 44°40′45.7″N 74°32′40.9″W

St. Regis Falls Central School

Location
- 92 North Main Street; St. Regis Falls, New York

Information
- School district: St. Regis Falls Central School District
- Chairperson: Danielle Emburey
- Principal: Wendie Boucher
- Faculty: 70
- Teaching staff: 26.26 (FTE)
- Grades: Pre-K-12
- Student to teacher ratio: 6.97
- Colors: Blue and Gold and
- Mascot: Saints
- Nickname: SRF
- Website: St. Regis Central School

Saint Regis Falls Central School is a school in Franklin County, New York, that serves grades Pre-K to Grade 12. The principals are Danielle Emburey and Wendie Boucher. The school is located in the hamlet of St. Regis Falls within the town of Waverly, and serves the towns of Dickinson, Hopkinton, Lawrence, Santa Clara and Waverly.

== History ==
=== Selected former superintendents ===
- Mrs. Patricia Dovi
- Mr. Michael A. Hunsinger–?-1986 (Named Superintendent of Waterloo Central School District)
- Mr. Ernest L. Witkowski
- Mr. Michael Valley–?-2002

=== Selected former principals ===
- Mr. Boyd McKendrick
- Mr. Kenneth Davison
- Mr. Philip L. Snyder–2002-2003
- Mr. Terry B. Remington–2003-2005
- Mr. Richard N. Hansen–2005--2007
