= New York State Route 458 =

State highway in the North Country of New York, US

New York State Route 458
- Map of northern New York with NY 458 highlighted in red

Route information
- Maintained by NYSDOT
- Length: 24.42 mi (39.30 km)
- Existed: July 1, 1972–present

Major junctions
- West end: NY 11B in Hopkinton
- East end: NY 30 in Brighton

Location
- Country: United States
- State: New York
- Counties: St. Lawrence, Franklin

Highway system
- New York Highways; Interstate; US; State; Reference; Parkways
← NY 456	→ NY 470

New York State Route 458 (NY 458) is a state highway in the North Country of New York in the United States. It extends for 24.42 miles (39.30 km) from an intersection with NY 11B in the St. Lawrence County town of Hopkinton to a junction with NY 30 in the Franklin County town of Brighton. The route follows a generally northwest–southeast alignment between the two points, serving only small hamlets as it crosses an otherwise rural area of the North Country. NY 458 was assigned on July 1, 1972 to the former routing of NY 72 east of the Hopkinton hamlet of Nicholville. Prior to being signed as part of NY 72 in 1930, it was designated as part of NY 56 in the 1920s.

== Route description ==
NY 458 begins at a junction with NY 11B in Hopkinton at the western fringe of the Lawrence hamlet of Nicholville. The route heads southeast, loosely paralleling the St. Regis River as it proceeds through rural eastern St. Lawrence County. After 3.5 miles (5.6 km), it passes into both the Franklin County town of Waverly and Adirondack Park.

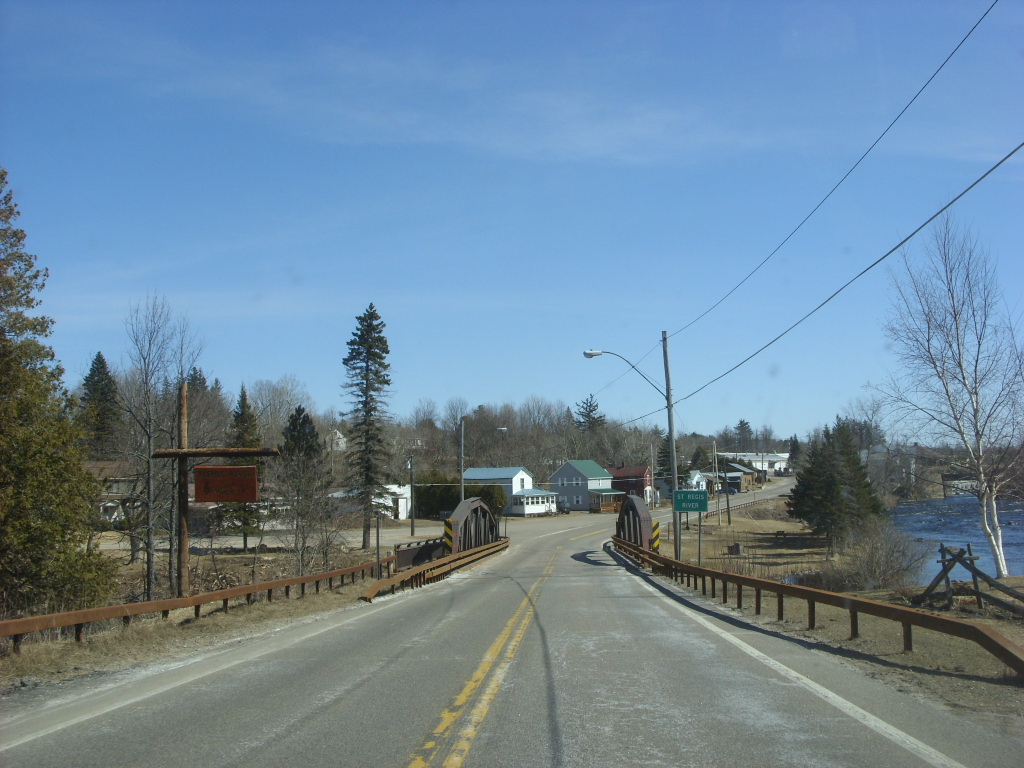
NY 458 eastbound entering the hamlet of St. Regis Falls

Now within the park boundaries, NY 458 crosses over the Lake Ozonia Outlet on its way eastward to the hamlet of St. Regis Falls, the largest community on the entire route. The route crosses the St. Regis River twice and intersects County Route 5 (CR 5), a connector to the hamlet of Moira 10 miles (16 km) to the north, within St. Regis Falls. At the junction with CR 5, here named North Main Street but known as Moira–St. Regis Falls Road north of Adirondack Park, the highway turns south to follow South Main Street out of the community.

NY 458 continues southeast through Waverly to the hamlet known as Santa Clara in the town of the same name. The route heads through the hamlet and over the St. Regis for the final time as it approaches Goodnow Mountain, a peak rising roughly 1,960 feet (600 m) above sea level. Instead of traversing the mountain, the highway bypasses it to the south. East of the peak, NY 458 turns southeast and begins to parallel the east branch of the St. Regis River. This pairing remains intact through the towns of Santa Clara and Duane to Brighton, where NY 458 ends at NY 30.

== History ==
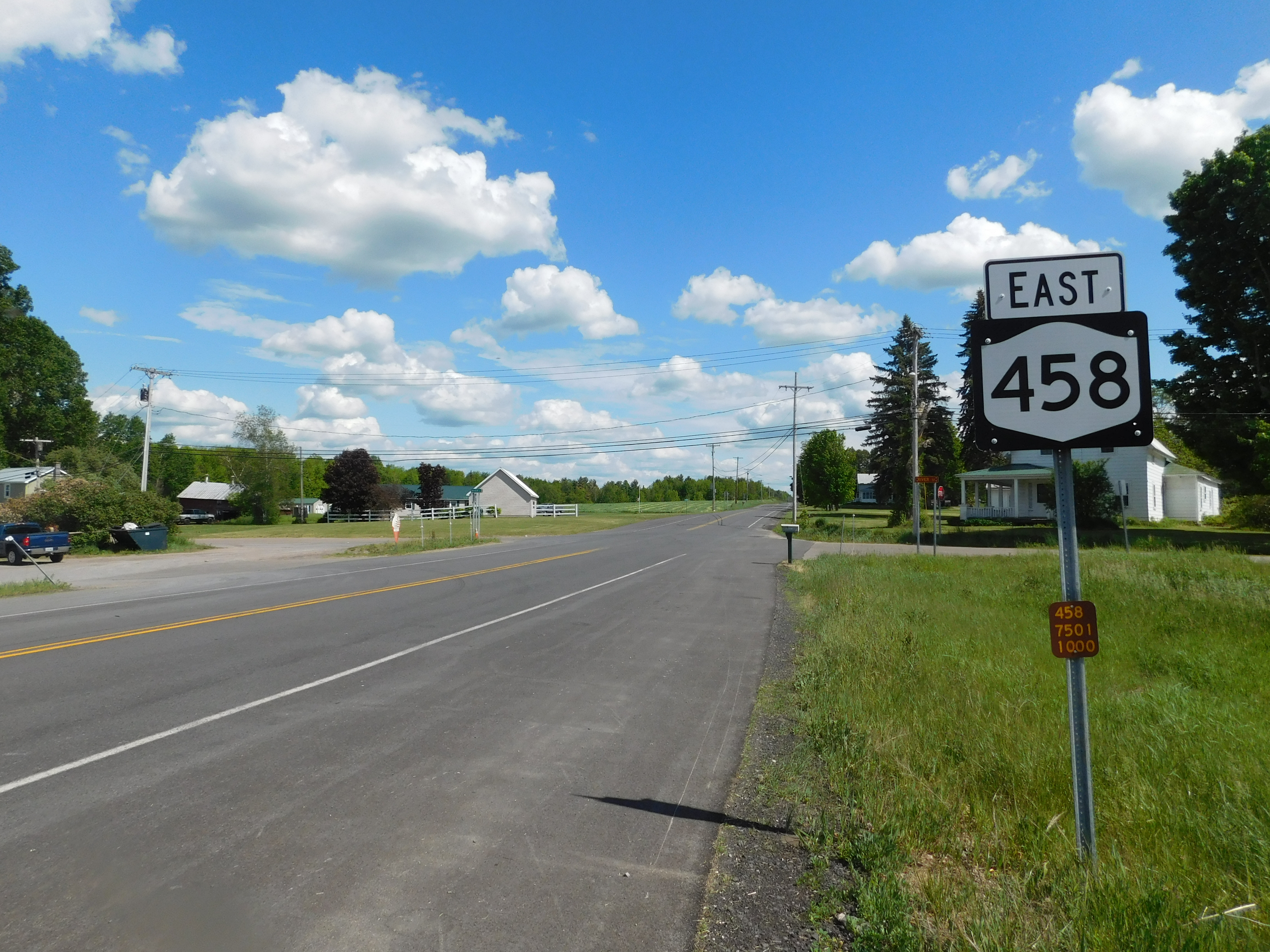
NY 458 in Nicholville

The entirety of modern NY 458 was originally designated as part of NY 56, a route extending from Massena to Brighton via Winthrop and Nicholville, in the mid-1920s. NY 56 was realigned in 1927 to continue west from Nicholville to a new terminus in Potsdam. In the 1930 renumbering of state highways in New York, NY 56 was renumbered to NY 72. The portion of NY 72 east of Nicholville remained unchanged until July 1, 1972 when NY 72 was truncated to its current eastern terminus in Hopkinton. The former routing of NY 72 from Nicholville to Brighton was renumbered to NY 458.

== Major intersections ==
County	Location	mi	km	Destinations	Notes
St. Lawrence	Hopkinton	0.00	0.00	NY 11B – Potsdam, Malone	Western terminus; hamlet of Nicholville
Franklin	Waverly	7.54	12.13	CR 5 (North Main Street) – Moira	Hamlet of St. Regis Falls
Franklin	Duane–Brighton town line	24.42	39.30	NY 30	Eastern terminus
1.000 mi = 1.609 km; 1.000 km = 0.621 mi
