= Parishville (CDP), New York =

Parishville, New York
- Census-designated place
- Location within New York Location within the United States
- Coordinates: 44°37′44″N 74°48′47″W
- Country: United States
- State: New York
- County: St. Lawrence
- Town: Parishville

Area
  - Total: 3.36 sq mi (8.70 km^{2})
  - Land: 3.29 sq mi (8.53 km^{2})
  - Water: 0.066 sq mi (0.17 km^{2})
- Elevation: 903 ft (275 m)

Population (2020)
  - Total: 642
  - Density: 194.9/sq mi (75.27/km^{2})
- Time zone: UTC-5 (Eastern (EST))
  - Summer (DST): UTC-4 (EDT)
- ZIP Code: 13672 (Parishville); 13676 (Potsdam)
- Area codes: 315/680
- FIPS code: 36-56363
- GNIS feature ID: 2627949

Parishville is the primary hamlet and a census-designated place (CDP) in the town of Parishville in St. Lawrence County, New York, United States. As of the 2010 census, it had a population of 647, out of 2,153 in the entire town of Parishville.

The community is in eastern St. Lawrence County, on the eastern side of the town of Parishville. The eastern edge of the CDP is the town border with Hopkinton. New York State Route 72 runs through Parishville, leading northeast 7 miles (11 km) to State Route 11B in Hopkinton and northwest 10 miles (16 km) to Potsdam.

The West Branch of the St. Regis River passes through the community, dropping over a dam in the center of the village and falling 130 feet (40 m) in elevation in less than one mile as it continues to Allen Falls Reservoir downstream. The West Branch joins the St. Regis River at Winthrop and is part of the St. Lawrence River watershed.

== Demographics ==
Historical population
Census	Pop.	Note	%±
2020	642		—
U.S. Decennial Census
