= New York State Route 72 =

State highway in St. Lawrence County, New York, US

New York State Route 72
- NY 72 highlighted in red

Route information
- Maintained by NYSDOT
- Length: 15.36 mi (24.72 km)
- Existed: 1930–present

Major junctions
- West end: NY 56 near Potsdam village
- East end: NY 11B in Hopkinton

Location
- Country: United States
- State: New York
- Counties: St. Lawrence

Highway system
- New York Highways; Interstate; US; State; Reference; Parkways
| ← NY 71 | → NY 73 |

New York State Route 72 (NY 72) is a 15.36-mile-long (24.72 km) state highway in the North Country of New York in the United States. The road is an east–west highway located entirely within the eastern part of St. Lawrence County. The western terminus of NY 72 is at an intersection with NY 56 in the town of Potsdam, south of the village of Potsdam. Its eastern terminus is at a junction with NY 11B west of the community of Hopkinton in the town of Hopkinton.

The NY 72 designation dates back to 1930; however, the route initially followed an entirely different alignment from Potsdam to Hopkinton and was much longer than it is now, extending as far east as Brighton, Franklin County. It was shifted onto its present routing by the 1940s and truncated to its current length in the 1970s.

== Route description ==
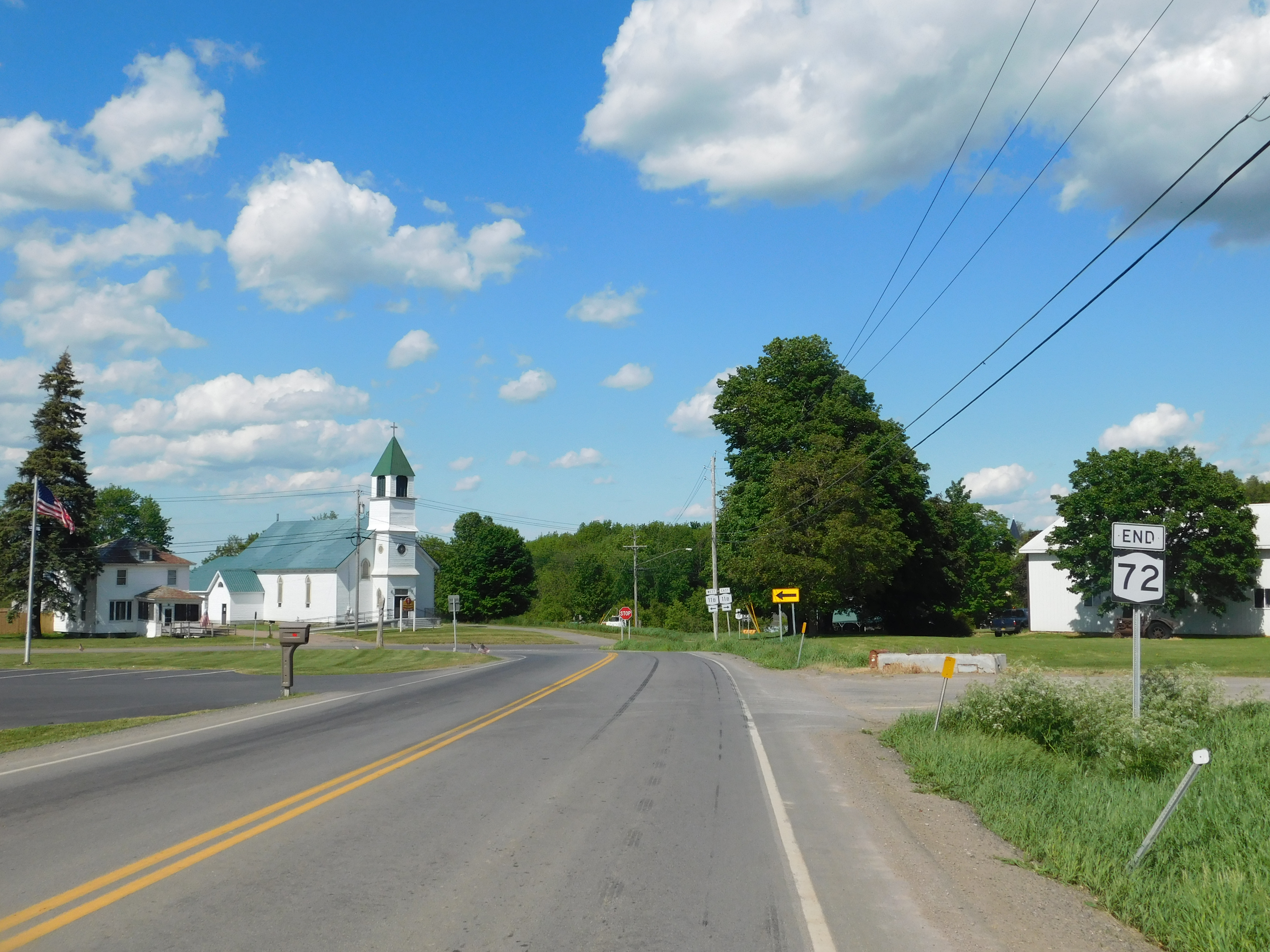
NY 72 at the junction with NY 11B in Hopkinton

NY 72 begins at an intersection with NY 56 southwest of the Potsdam village limits in the town of the same name in northern St. Lawrence County. The route heads southeast on a line to Stafford Corners, a small hamlet located on the Potsdam-Parishville line, then turns east to serve the hamlets of Parishville Center, located at the junction of NY 72 and Ashton/Sinclair Roads, and Parishville, located on the west branch of the St. Regis River. Within Parishville, NY 72, named Main Street, crosses the river and intersects the southern end of County Route 47 (CR 47), a connector leading to U.S. Route 11 (US 11) and NY 11C 10 miles (16 km) to the north.

East of the hamlet of Parishville, NY 72 turns to the northeast and proceeds on a linear alignment through the towns of Parishville and Hopkinton toward the hamlet of Hopkinton in the northeast corner of the town of the same name. Upon reaching the community, the route terminates at NY 11B, the primary east–west route through the hamlet.

== History ==
New York State Route 72A
- Location: Hopkinton
- Existed: 1930–1940s

The primary east–west roadway connecting Potsdam to Brighton via Southville, Hopkinton, and Saint Regis Falls (modern NY 11B and NY 458) was originally designated as part of NY 2A from Potsdam to Nicholville and as part of NY 56 from Nicholville to Brighton in the mid-1920s. NY 56 initially continued northwestward from Nicholville to Massena by way of Lawrenceville, North Lawrence, and Winthrop. When NY 2 was redesignated as US 11 in 1927, the NY 2A designation was eliminated and replaced with a rerouted NY 56 from Potsdam to Nicholville. NY 56 was truncated to end in Potsdam as part of the change. In the 1930 renumbering of state highways in New York, NY 56 was renumbered to NY 72 while an alternate routing of NY 72 between Potsdam and Hopkinton via Parishville was assigned NY 72A.

When NY 11B was assigned in the renumbering, it was simply a north–south connector between Nicholville and Lawrenceville. By the following year, NY 11B was extended west from Nicholville to Potsdam, creating a lengthy overlap with NY 72 between the two locations. The length of the concurrency was significantly reduced in the early 1940s when NY 72 was rerouted to follow NY 72A between Potsdam and Hopkinton. The overlap was eliminated on July 1, 1972 when NY 72 was truncated to the west end of its overlap with NY 11B. The portion of former NY 72 southeast of Nicholville became NY 458.

== Major intersections ==
The entire route is in St. Lawrence County.

| Location | mi | km | Destinations | Notes |
|---|---|---|---|---|
| Town of Potsdam | 0.00 | 0.00 | NY 56 – Colton, Potsdam | Western terminus |
| Hopkinton | 15.36 | 24.72 | NY 11B – Potsdam, Malone | Eastern terminus; hamlet of Hopkinton |
1.000 mi = 1.609 km; 1.000 km = 0.621 mi
