= New York State Route 11B =

Highway in New York

New York State Route 11B
- Map of northern New York with NY 11B highlighted in red

Route information
- Auxiliary route of US 11
- Maintained by NYSDOT
- Length: 36.98 mi (59.51 km)
- Existed: 1930–present

Major junctions
- West end: US 11 in Potsdam
- East end: US 11 / NY 30 / NY 37 in Malone

Location
- Country: United States
- State: New York
- Counties: St. Lawrence, Franklin

Highway system
- New York Highways; Interstate; US; State; Reference; Parkways
← NY 11A	→ NY 11C

New York State Route 11B (NY 11B) is a state highway in northern New York in the United States. It provides a parallel, more southerly east–west route to U.S. Route 11 between US 11 in Potsdam and US 11, NY 30, and NY 37 in Malone. NY 11B serves both the Potsdam Municipal Airport and the riverside hamlet of Nicholville, where NY 11B meets NY 458. Aside from the two villages at each end of the route and the hamlet of Nicholville near the midpoint, NY 11B passes through rural, lightly populated areas, as does its parent to the north. In Malone, NY 11B overlaps NY 30 for one block in order to reconnect to US 11.

NY 11B was assigned as part of the 1930 renumbering of state highways in New York, but to a completely different routing than it follows today. Initially, it was a connector between then-NY 72 in Nicholville and US 11 in Lawrenceville. The route was extended west to Potsdam by 1931 and rerouted to run from Nicholville to Malone c. 1938. The latter realignment supplanted New York State Route 187, an east–west highway assigned in 1930 that initially extended from Nicholville to North Bangor but was later realigned to serve Malone.

== Route description ==
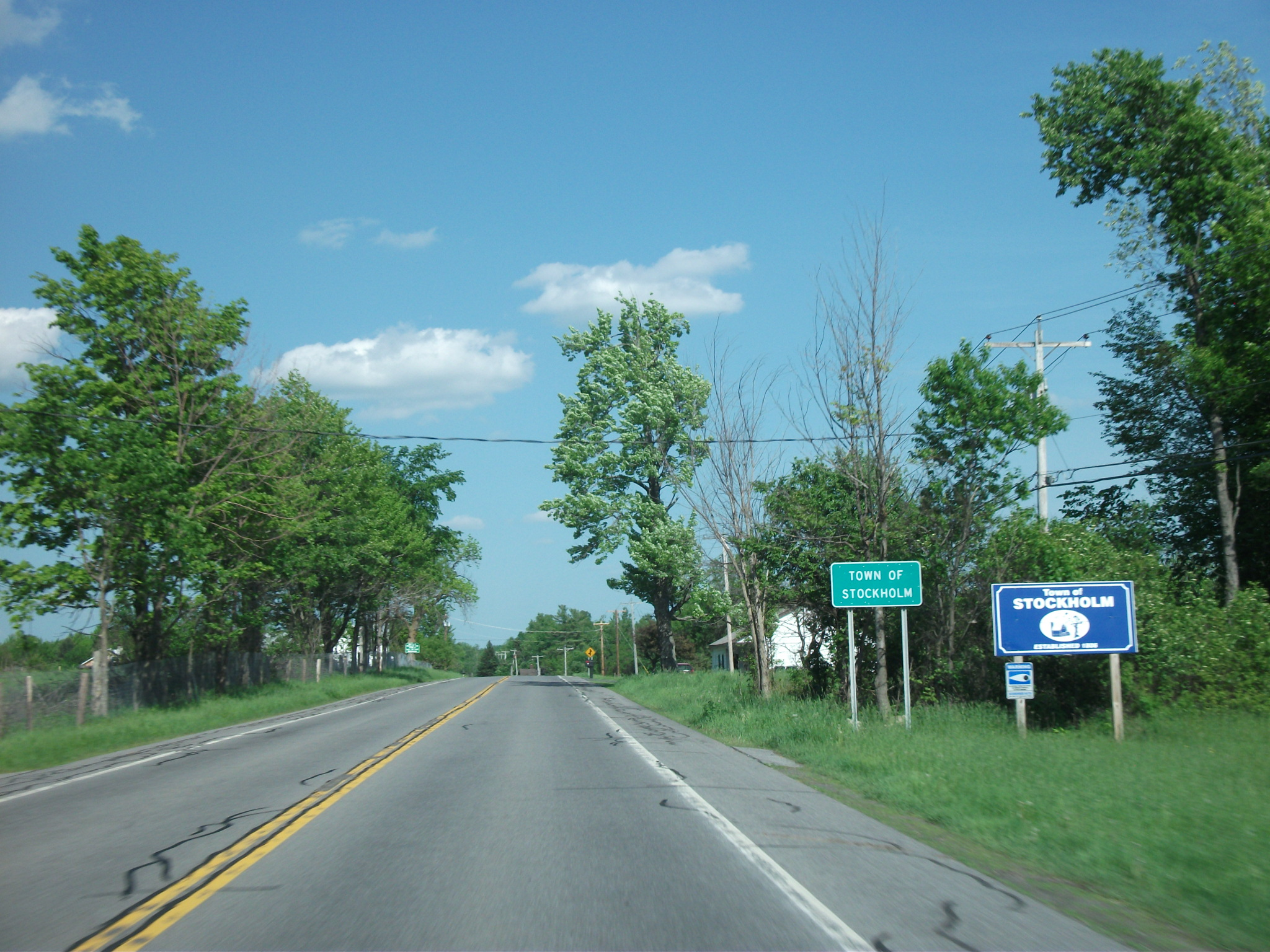
NY 11B entering the town of Stockholm

NY 11B begins at an intersection with US 11 (Lawrence Street) in the village of Potsdam just north of the junction with NY 56. NY 11B proceeds eastward on Elm Street past a local church and the Clarkson University ROTC as a two-lane residential village street. After passing a distance north of SUNY Potsdam, NY 11B leaves the village for the town of Potsdam, maintaining its Elm Street moniker until Hatch Road and Potsdam Municipal/Damon Field, a local airport. For a distance through Potsdam, NY 11B remains residential, crossing into the town of Stockholm. After the crossing, NY 11B becomes more rural, crossing over a creek and into the hamlet of Southville. Southville consists of a few homes and a junction with County Route 47 (CR 47; Parishville–Southville Road). The two routes are concurrent through Southville, before CR 47 turns north on Southville–Holmes Hill Road. After this junction, NY 11B leaves the hamlet of Southville.

NY 11B turns northeast through the town of Stockholm, entering the rural hamlet of Converse. For a short distance through Converse, NY 11B is surrounded by residences, entering the town of Parishville and soon Hopkinton. In Hopkinton, NY 11B crosses east through the rural hamlet of Beechertown as a two-lane highway. A couple miles east of Beechertown, NY 72 intersects and terminates at a junction with NY 11B in the hamlet of Hopkinton. Through the hamlet, NY 11B serves as the main commercial street, intersecting with the southern terminus of CR 49 (Fort Jackson–Hopkinton Road). NY 11B soon leaves the hamlet, passing a large farm before intersecting with NY 458, which forks to the southeast off NY 11B. After this junction, NY 11B turns to the northeast and crosses the St. Regis River, entering a residential community, where CR 55 intersects. This intersection with CR 55 was once the former southern terminus of NY 195. A short distance after, NY 11B crosses into the town of Lawrence, proceeding northeast as a two-lane residential road. After the intersection with Peru Street, NY 11B crosses the county line into Franklin County.

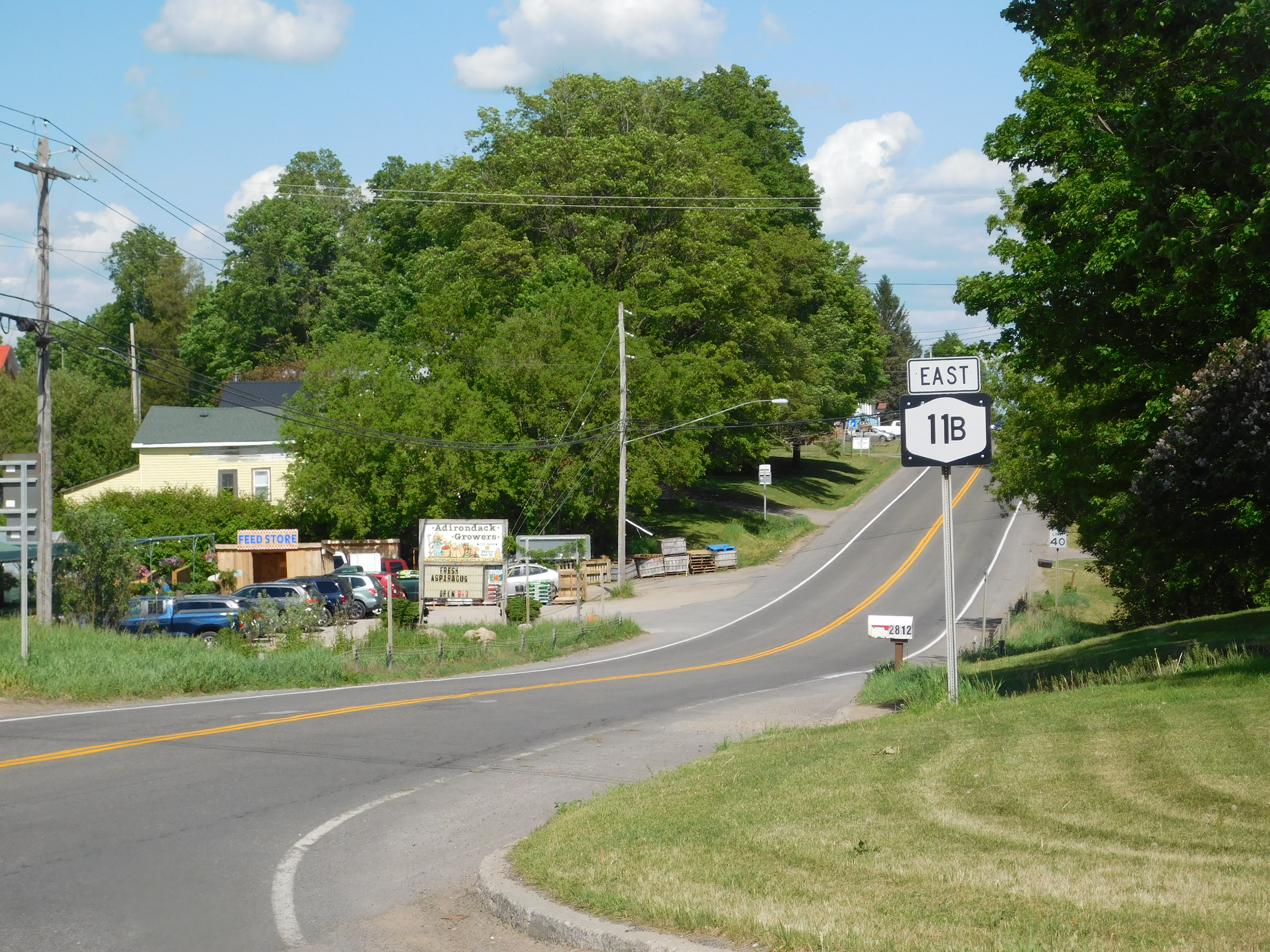
NY 11B east of NY 72 in Hopkinton

After crossing the county line, NY 11B enters the town of Dickinson. The route remains a two-lane rural roadway, proceeding northeast through Dickinson. Within Dickinson, NY 11B intersects with CR 5 (Moira–St. Regis Falls Road), a former alignment of NY 95. This junction also serves as the hamlet of Dickinson, with a few residences spread out around the intersection. NY 11B continues northeast through Dickinson, passing a local park to the southeast, before intersecting with CR 7 (Gale Road). NY 11B enters the hamlet of East Dickinson, where it serves as a two-lane residential roadway. Soon, NY 11B enters the town of Moira and soon Bangor. Through Bangor, NY 11B intersects with CR 16 (Bacon Road) and CR 15 (Eddy Road).

NY 11B soon enters the hamlet of West Bangor, passing the local cemetery, and intersecting with CR 10 (Crooks Road), passing as a two-lane residential street. Just before leaving West Bangor, NY 11B passes some commercial businesses. NY 11B continues northeast, crossing an intersection with CR 53 (North Bangor Road) and CR 13 (Skerry Road) in the hamlet of Bangor. In the hamlet, the route serves as a main street before leaving the hamlet for a rural background. After a short distance, NY 11B crosses into the town of Malone. Through Malone, NY 11B remains rural, passing multiple farms before entering the village of Malone. In the village, NY 11B gains the moniker of Franklin Street, becoming a two-lane residential road. Within downtown Malone, NY 11B intersects with NY 30 (Finney Boulevard). At this junction, NY 11B turns northward on NY 30, forming a village block-long concurrency through Malone, before NY 11B terminates at an intersection with US 11, NY 30 and NY 37 (Finney Boulevard).

== History ==
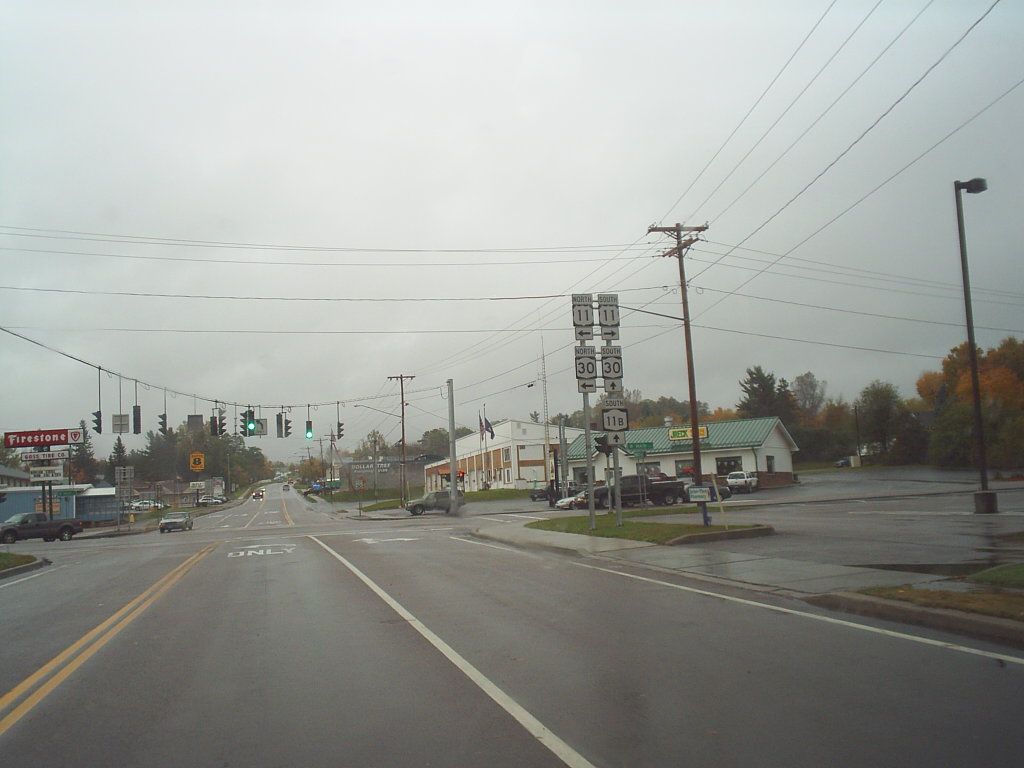
NY 11B's northern terminus as seen from NY 37 in Malone

In 1908, the New York State Legislature created Route 30, an unsigned legislative route extending from Niagara Falls to Rouses Point via Maple View, Potsdam and Lawrenceville. Route 30 followed what is now NY 11B east from Potsdam to Nicholville, where it turned north to follow modern County Routes 55 and 54 to Lawrenceville. When the first set of posted routes in New York were assigned in 1924, NY 2 was assigned to most of legislative Route 30 between Maple View and Rouses Point. The lone exception was from Potsdam to Lawrenceville, where NY 2 followed a more northerly alignment via Winthrop and North Lawrence. The bypassed section of legislative Route 30 between Potsdam and Lawrenceville was designated as NY 2A by 1926.

The Nicholville–Lawrenceville segment of NY 2A was concurrent with NY 56, another route assigned in the mid-1920s that extended from Massena in the northwest to Meacham Lake in the southeast via Winthrop and Saint Regis Falls. When NY 2 was redesignated as U.S. Route 11 in 1927, the NY 2A designation was eliminated and replaced with a realigned NY 56 from Potsdam to Nicholville. NY 56 was truncated to end in Potsdam as part of the change. In the 1930 renumbering of state highways in New York, NY 56 was renumbered to NY 72 while NY 11B was assigned to the pre-1927 routing of NY 56 between Nicholville and Lawrenceville. At the same time, a connector between NY 11B in Nicholville and U.S. Route 11 in North Bangor by way of Bangor was designated NY 187. NY 11B was extended westward to Potsdam by the following year, creating a lengthy overlap with NY 72.

NY 187 was realigned c. 1937 to continue east from Bangor to Malone. By the following year, NY 11B was rerouted to continue east from Nicholville to Malone, replacing NY 187. The former alignment of NY 11B north of Nicholville became NY 195. In the early 1940s, NY 72 was rerouted west of the Hopkinton hamlet of the same name to follow its current alignment south of NY 11B, eliminating all but 2 miles (3.2 km) of the overlap between NY 11B and NY 72. It was removed entirely c. 1973 when NY 72 was truncated to its current eastern terminus. On April 1, 1980, ownership and maintenance of NY 11B between Wellington Street and NY 30 was transferred from the village of Malone to the state of New York as part of a highway maintenance swap between the state and Franklin County.

== Major intersections ==
County	Location	mi	km	Destinations	Notes
St. Lawrence	Village of Potsdam	0.00	0.00	US 11 (Lawrence Avenue)	Western terminus
St. Lawrence	Hopkinton	13.69	22.03	NY 72 west – Parishville	Eastern terminus of NY 72; hamlet of Hopkinton
St. Lawrence	Hopkinton	15.87	25.54	NY 458 east – St. Regis Falls	Western terminus of NY 458; hamlet of Nicholville
St. Lawrence	Lawrence	16.29	26.22	CR 55	Former NY 195; hamlet of Nicholville
Franklin	Village of Malone	36.72	59.10	NY 30 south (Finney Boulevard) – Saranac Lake	Southern terminus of NY 11B / NY 30 overlap
Franklin	Village of Malone	36.98	59.51	US 11 (Main Street) / NY 30 north / NY 37 west (Finney Boulevard) – Potsdam, Chateaugay, Massena	Eastern terminus, northern terminus of NY 11B / NY 30 overlap; eastern terminus of NY 37
1.000 mi = 1.609 km; 1.000 km = 0.621 mi: Concurrency terminus
