= Upstate Niagara Cooperative =

Upstate Niagara Cooperative, Inc.
- Type: Agricultural marketing cooperative
- Industry: Food
- Founded: 1965
- Headquarters: Buffalo, New York, United States
- Area served: Western New York
- Products: Dairy
- Subsidiaries: Bison Foods Company; O-AT-KA Milk Products; North Country Dairy, LLC; Valley Farms Dairy
- Website: uncdairy.com

Upstate Niagara Cooperative, Inc., also known as UNC Dairy, is an American dairy cooperative located in Buffalo, New York. Products provided by the cooperative include milk, cream, butter, yogurt, half and half, juices, egg nog, cottage cheese, sour cream, ice cream mix and chip dips. Upstate Niagara Cooperative is owned by farmers throughout western New York State.

Primary production facilities are located in Buffalo, West Seneca, Batavia, Syracuse, the North Country, and in Williamsport, Pennsylvania. A plant was also located in Manchester, New York, but has since closed. It was formerly owned by Dairy Center of the Finger Lakes before being purchased by the cooperative in 1979.

== Brands ==
The family of brands for Upstate Niagara Cooperative:

- Upstate Farms (formerly Upstate Milk)
- Upstate Farms Food Services
- Bison Foods
- Intense Milk
- Crave
- O-AT-KA Milk Products Cooperative
- Valley Farms Dairy (Williamsport, Pennsylvania)

== History ==
The cooperative was started in 1965, originally known as Upstate Farms Cooperative. It was changed to the current name in 2006 when the business merged with longtime dairy producer Niagara Milk Producers Cooperative, Inc. of Niagara Falls, New York.

Upstate Niagara Cooperative acquired Bison Foods Company of Buffalo in 1983, a producer of cottage cheese, sour cream, chip dips and yogurt.

In 2011, Upstate Niagara Cooperative purchased a dairy plant in North Lawrence, New York from Healthy Food Holdings. The facility, built in 1900, has been through numerous owners including Borden, National Dairy Products Corporation and Kraft. It was established by the cooperative as North Country Dairy, LLC, which continues to produce yogurt as it has been doing since 1969.

In 2025, the company closed their Rochester, New York fluid milk plant, but also broke ground on a large expansion at the cultured products plant in West Seneca.
