= Waverly, New York =

Waverly is the name of some places in the U.S. state of New York:

- Waverly, Tioga County, New York, a village in New York's Southern Tier
- Waverly, Franklin County, New York, a town in Northern New York
- Waverly, Cattaraugus County, New York, a hamlet in Western New York, now known as Otto, within the town of Otto, New York
