= Lawrenceville, New York =

Lawrenceville, New York may refer to:

- Lawrenceville, a hamlet within Catskill (town), New York, in Greene County
- Lawrenceville, a hamlet within Lawrence, St. Lawrence County, New York

== See also ==
- Lawrence, Nassau County, New York
