= Hopkinton Green Historic District =

Historic district in New York, United States

- U.S. National Register of Historic Places
- U.S. Historic district
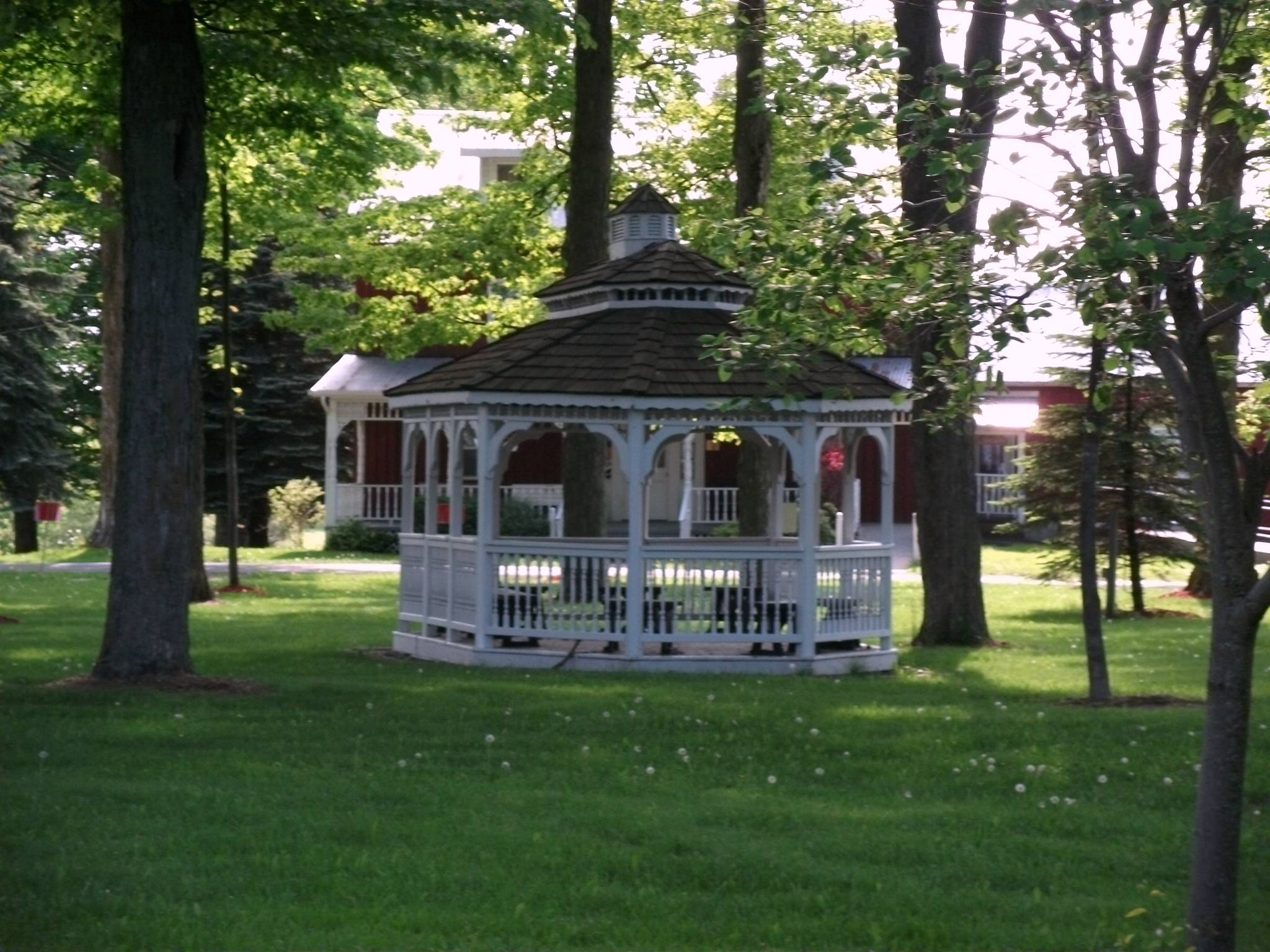
- Village Green, May 2011

- Location within New York Location within the United States
- Location: NY 11B, Co. Rd. 49 & Church St, Hopkinton, New York
- Coordinates: 44°41′26″N 74°42′15″W
- Area: 1.72 acres (0.70 ha)
- Built: 1808
- Architectural style: Italianate, Shingle Style
- NRHP reference No.: 14000583
- Added to NRHP: September 10, 2014

Hopkinton Green Historic District is a national historic district located at Hopkinton, St. Lawrence County, New York. The district encompasses two contributing buildings and one contributing site in the town of Hopkinton. The district is centered on the village green and include representative examples of Italianate and Shingle Style architecture. Contributing resources are the Hopkinton Green (1808), Town Hall (1870), and Congregational Church (1892).

It was listed on the National Register of Historic Places in 2013.

== Gallery ==
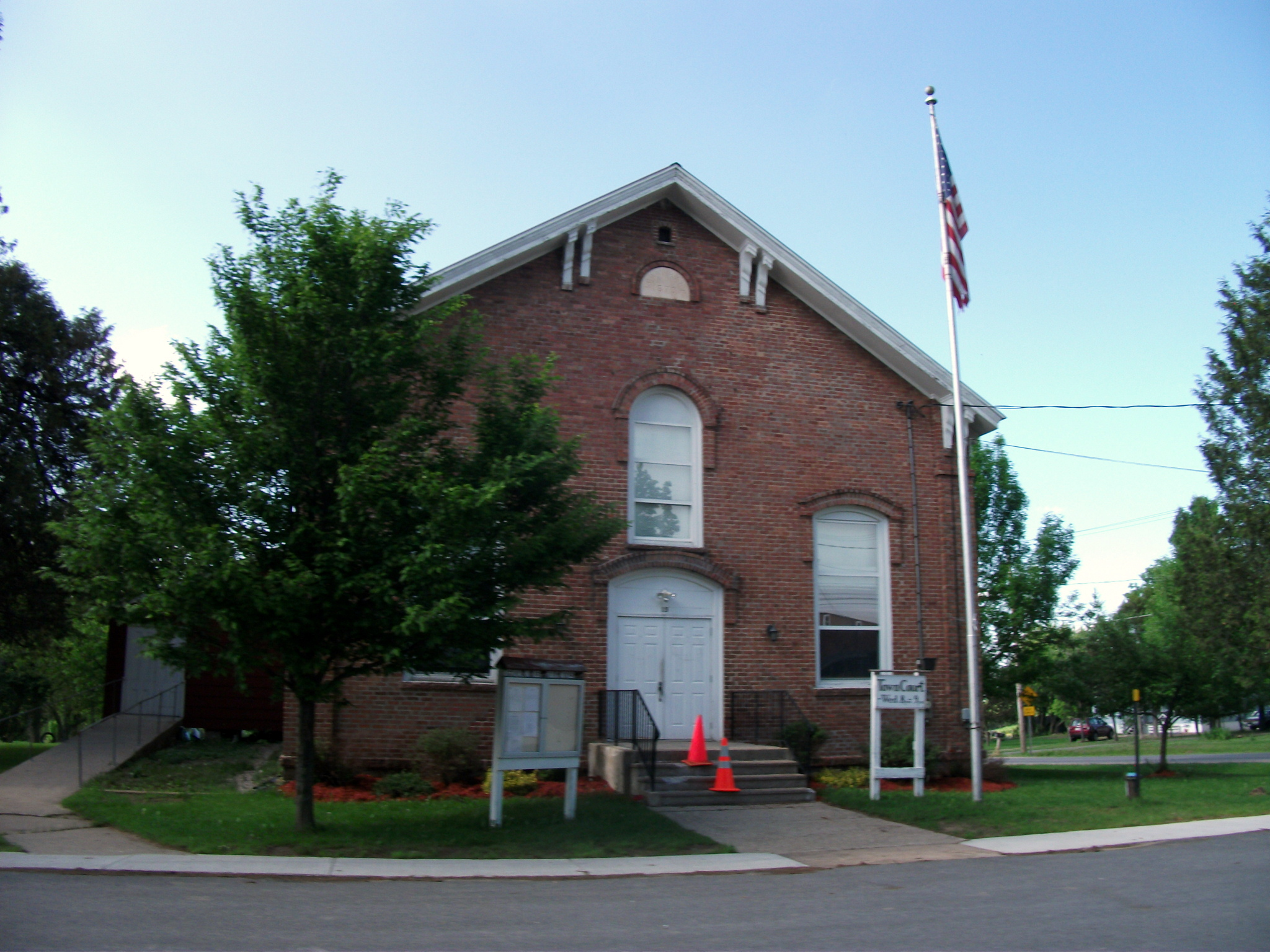
Town Hall, May 2011

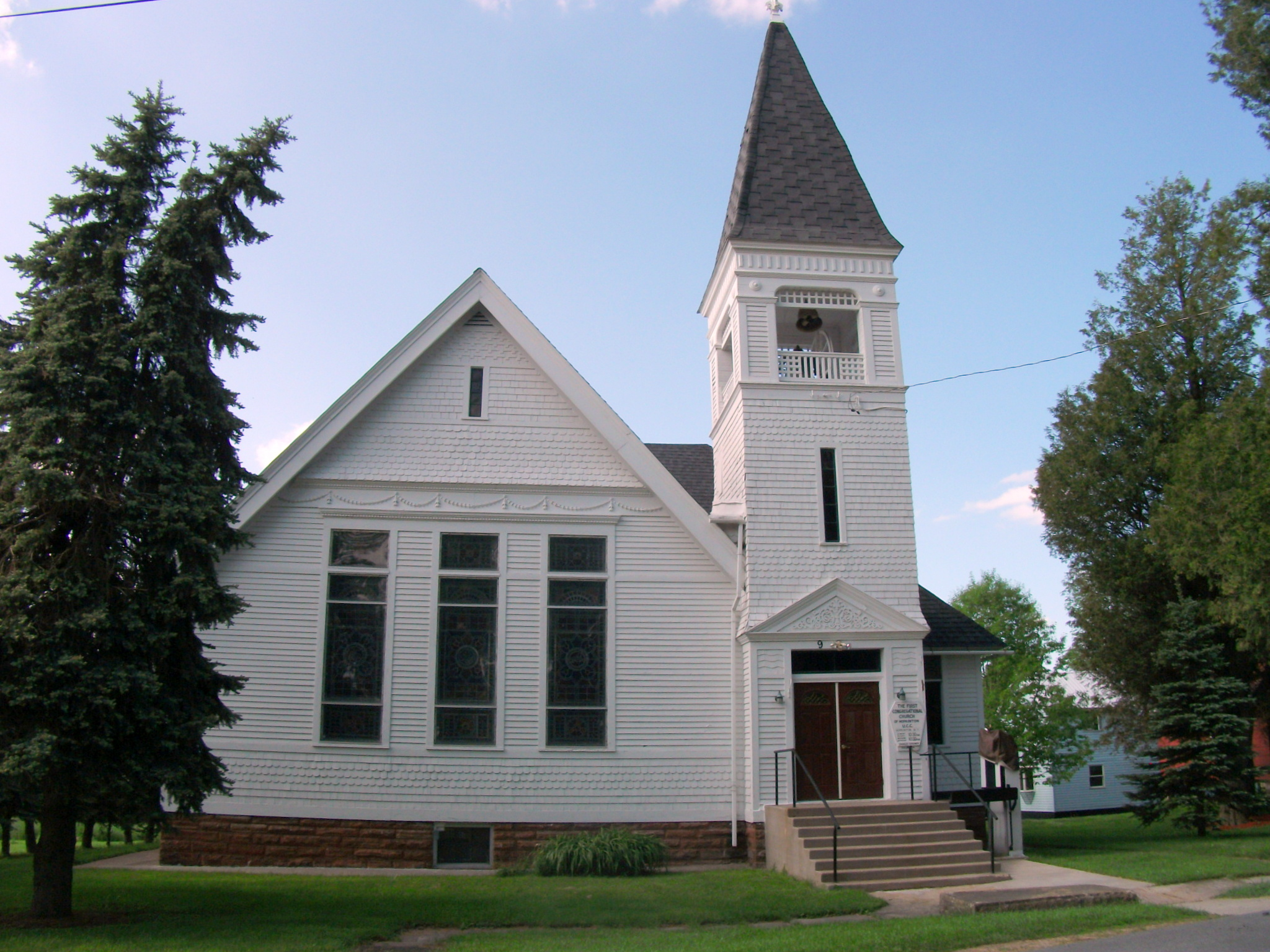
Congregational Church, May 2011
