= Azure Mountain Fire Observation Station =

- U.S. National Register of Historic Places
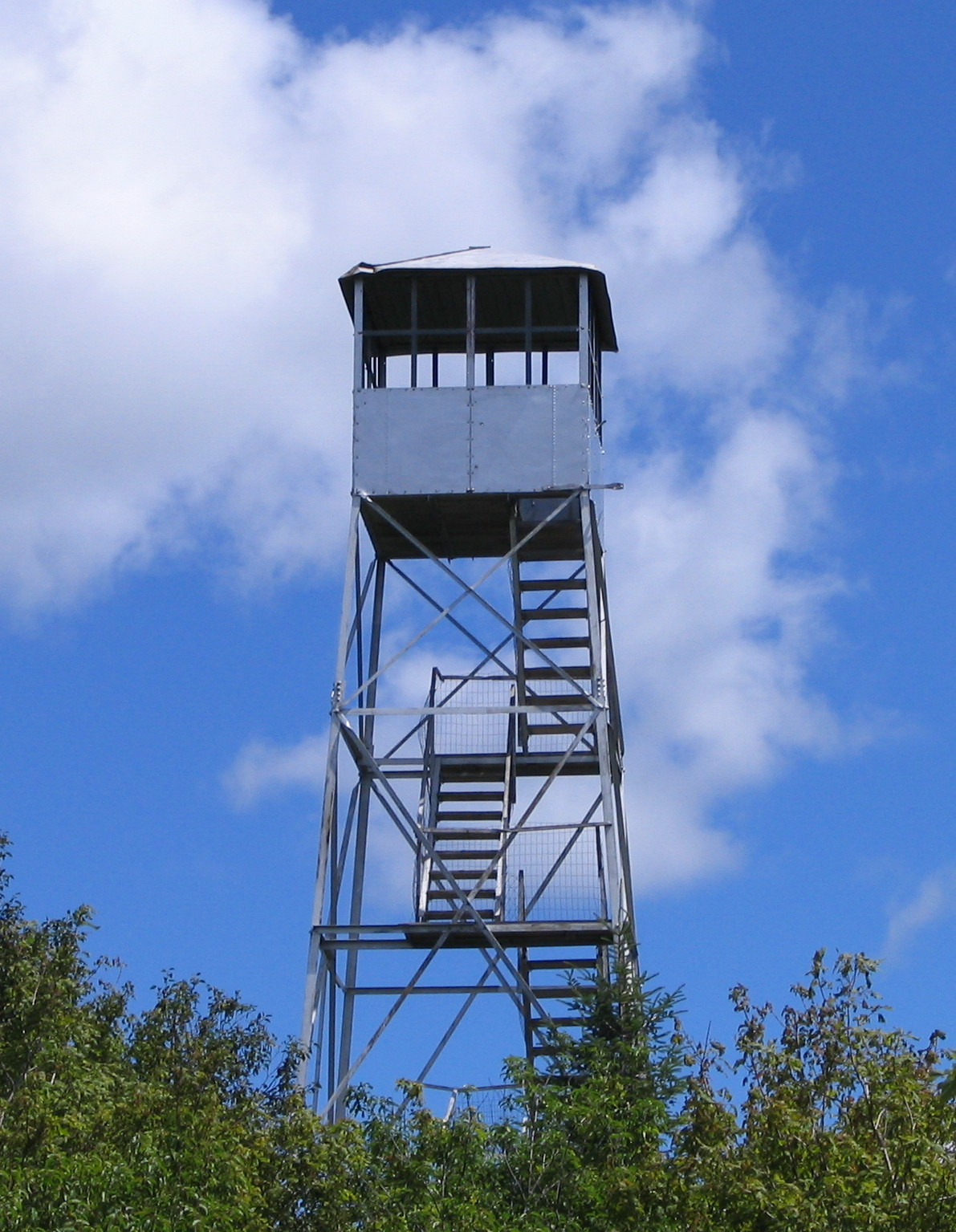
- Azure Mountain Fire Tower, August 2008

- Location within New York Location within the United States
- Location: Azure Mountain, Waverly, New York
- Coordinates: 44°32′28″N 74°30′0″W
- Area: 3.7 acres (1.5 ha)
- Built: 1918
- Architect: Aermotor Corporation
- MPS: Fire Observation Stations of New York State Forest Preserve MPS
- NRHP reference No.: 01001036
- Added to NRHP: September 23, 2001

The Azure Mountain Fire Observation Station is a historic fire observation station located on Azure Mountain at Waverly in Franklin County, New York. The station and contributing resources include a 40-foot-tall (12 m), steel-frame lookout tower erected in 1918, a jeep trail now used as a hiking trail, which extends from the base of the mountain to two former observers' cabins, and a foot trail from the cabins to the summit. The tower is a prefabricated structure built by the Aermotor Corporation to provide a front line of defense in preserving the Adirondack Forest Preserve from the hazards of forest fires.

It was added to the National Register of Historic Places in 2001.
