= Lake Ozonia =

- Location within New York Lake Ozonia (the United States)
- Location: Adirondack Park, St. Lawrence County, New York, US
- Coordinates: 44°35′43″N 74°36′30″W
- Type: Lake
- Primary outflows: Lake Ozonia Outlet
- Basin countries: United States
- Surface area: 408 acres (165 ha)
- Average depth: 20 ft (6.1 m)
- Max. depth: 58 ft (18 m)
- Shore length^{1}: 6.9 mi (11.1 km)
- Surface elevation: 1,381 ft (421 m)
- Islands: 2
- Settlements: Lake Ozonia, New York, Hopkinton, New York
- ^{1} Shore length is not a well-defined measure.

Lake Ozonia is located near Lake Ozonia, New York, St. Lawrence County in the Adirondacks in upstate New York. The outlet of the lake is Lake Ozonia Outlet which flows into the St. Regis River.

== Fishing ==
The lake is a popular fishing spot partly because it is close to the St. Regis River which is stocked with over 10,000 trout each year. The lake itself harbors different species of fish including splake, atlantic salmon, rainbow trout, brown trout, american eel, lake trout, landlocked salmon, smallmouth bass, yellow perch, and brown bullhead. It can be fished year-round and there is a NYSDEC carry-down boat launch located on Lake Ozonia Road. The lake may only be accessed by a non-motorized boat or a motorized boat with a 10 horsepower or less motor.

== Links ==
https://www.facebook.com/LakeOzoniaWaterfront
