= Azure Mountain =

Mountain in New York, United States

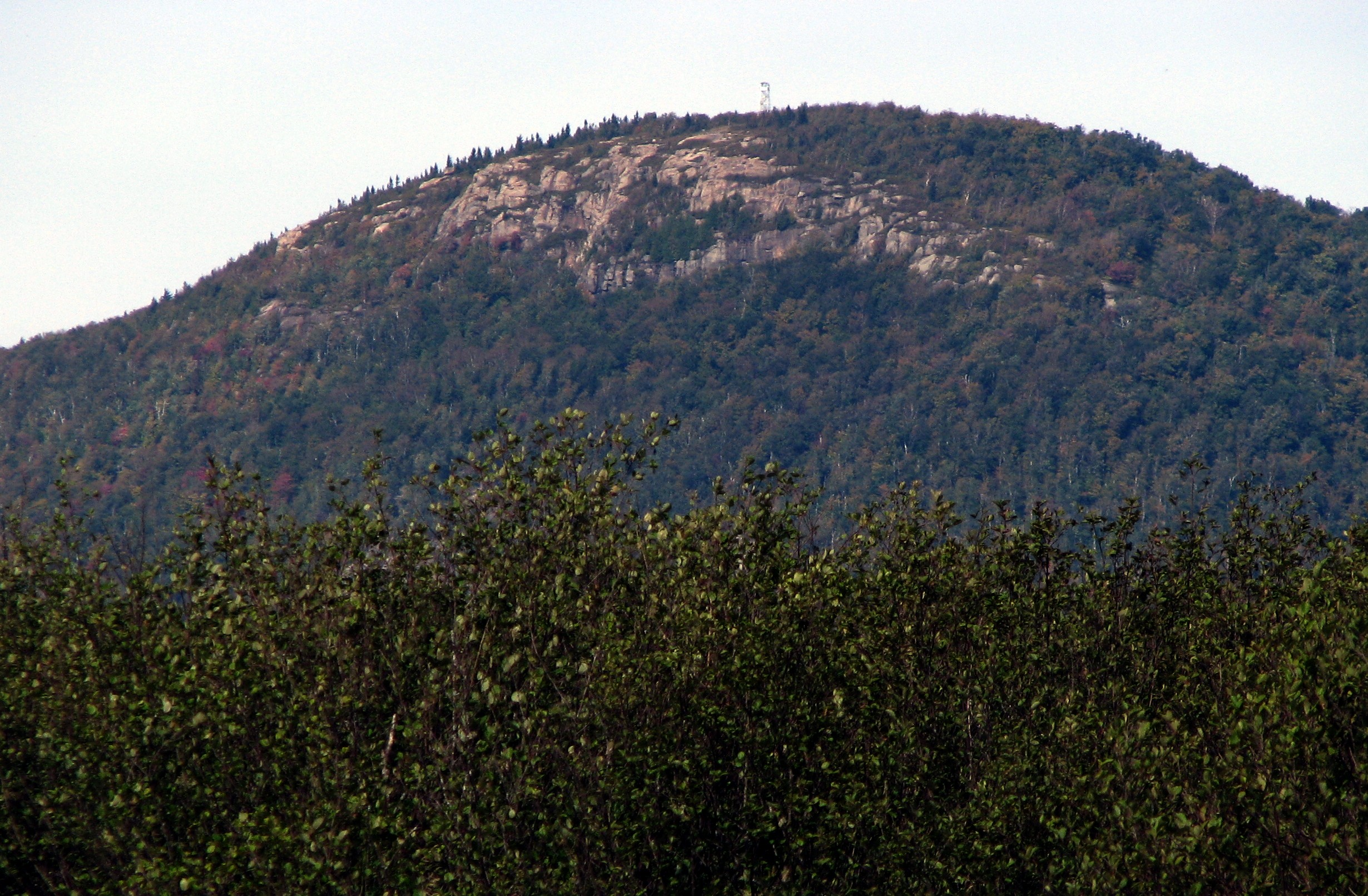
- Azure Mountain from the St. Regis River

Highest point
- Elevation: 2,323 ft (708 m)
- Coordinates: 44°32′29″N 74°29′59″W, 44°32′34″N 74°30′17″W

Geography
- Location within New York Adirondack Park Location within the United States
- Location: Franklin County, New York
- Topo map(s): USGS Meno, Lake Ozonia

Azure Mountain is a 2,323-foot-tall (708 m) mountain near Blue Mountain Road in the Adirondack Park town of Waverly in Franklin County, New York. Azure Mountain is the site of the Azure Mountain Fire Observation Station, a 35-foot-tall (11 m) steel tower that was built in 1918 and later restored in 2002. The fire tower was listed on the National Register of Historic Places in 2001.

== Azure tower ==
In 1914, the Conservation Commission built a wood fire lookout tower on the mountain. In 1918, the Conservation Commission replaced it with a 35-foot-tall (11 m) Aermotor LS40 steel tower. There is an inscription on one of the legs of the tower that reads "W. H. Finley, Keeseville, 7/29/1918". The tower ceased fire lookout operations at the end of the 1979 fire season. The Azure Mountain Fire Observation Station was listed on the National Register of Historic Places on September 28, 2001, and also appears on the National Historic Lookout Register. The first meeting of the Azure Mountain Friends took place in November 2001, to organize restoration of the tower. The tower was completely restored from 2002 to 2003, and was officially opened on Sept. 27, 2003. A new map was created and installed in the cab using the original metal supports. An estimated 8,000 to 10,000 people visit Azure Mountain each year.

== Azure Mountain Friends ==
The Azure Mountain Friends conduct a yearly Summit Interpreter program, scheduling volunteers on the summit most weekends between Memorial and Columbus days, as well as a High School/College Scholarship program. Local students, high school and college, are encouraged to apply. One or more recipients receive scholarships each year in the amount of $500 and in return volunteer on the summit as an interpreter for five days. The Azure Mountain Friends have an Adopt-a-Natural-Resource agreement with the New York State Department of Environmental Conservation.

== Gallery ==
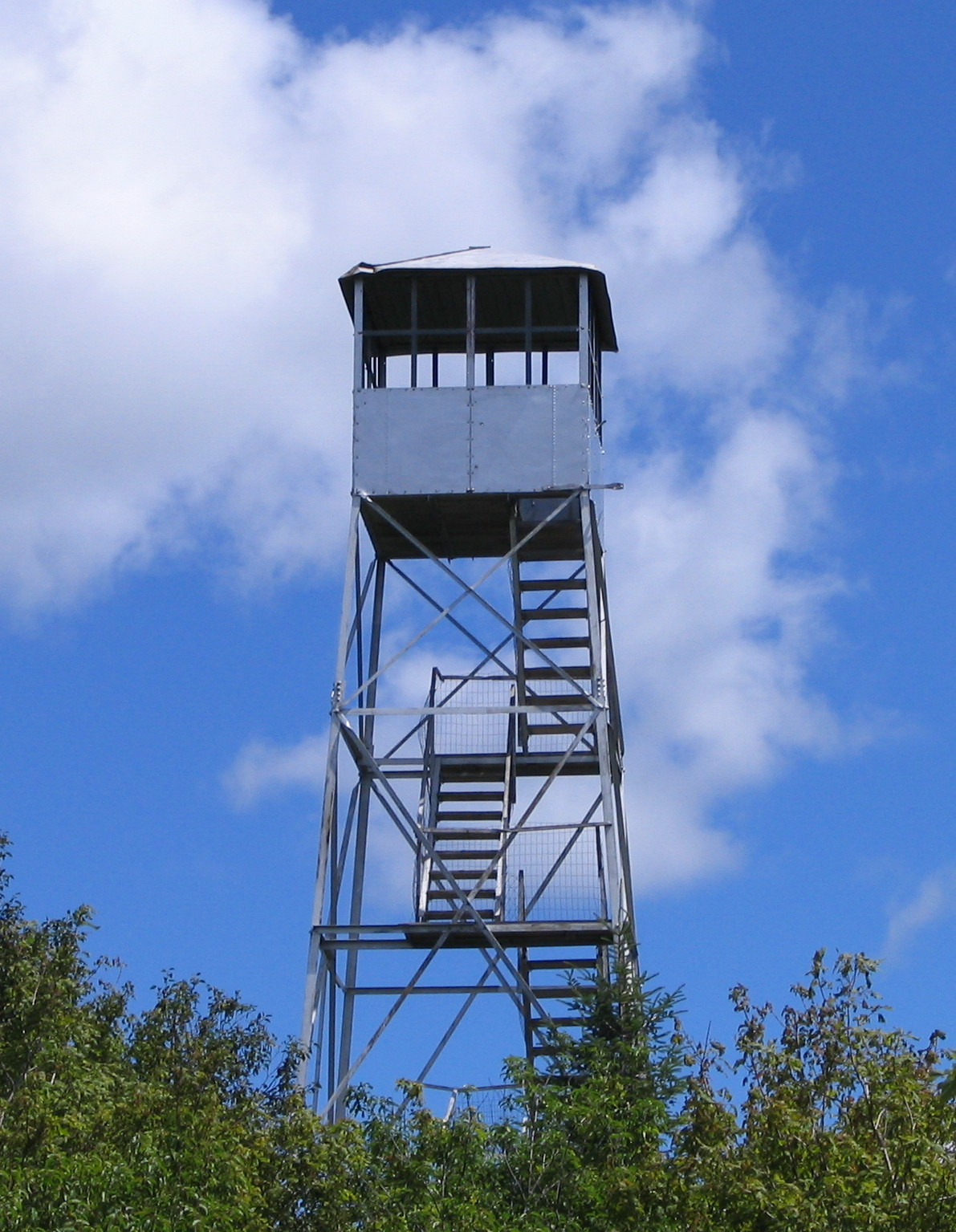
Azure Mountain Fire Tower

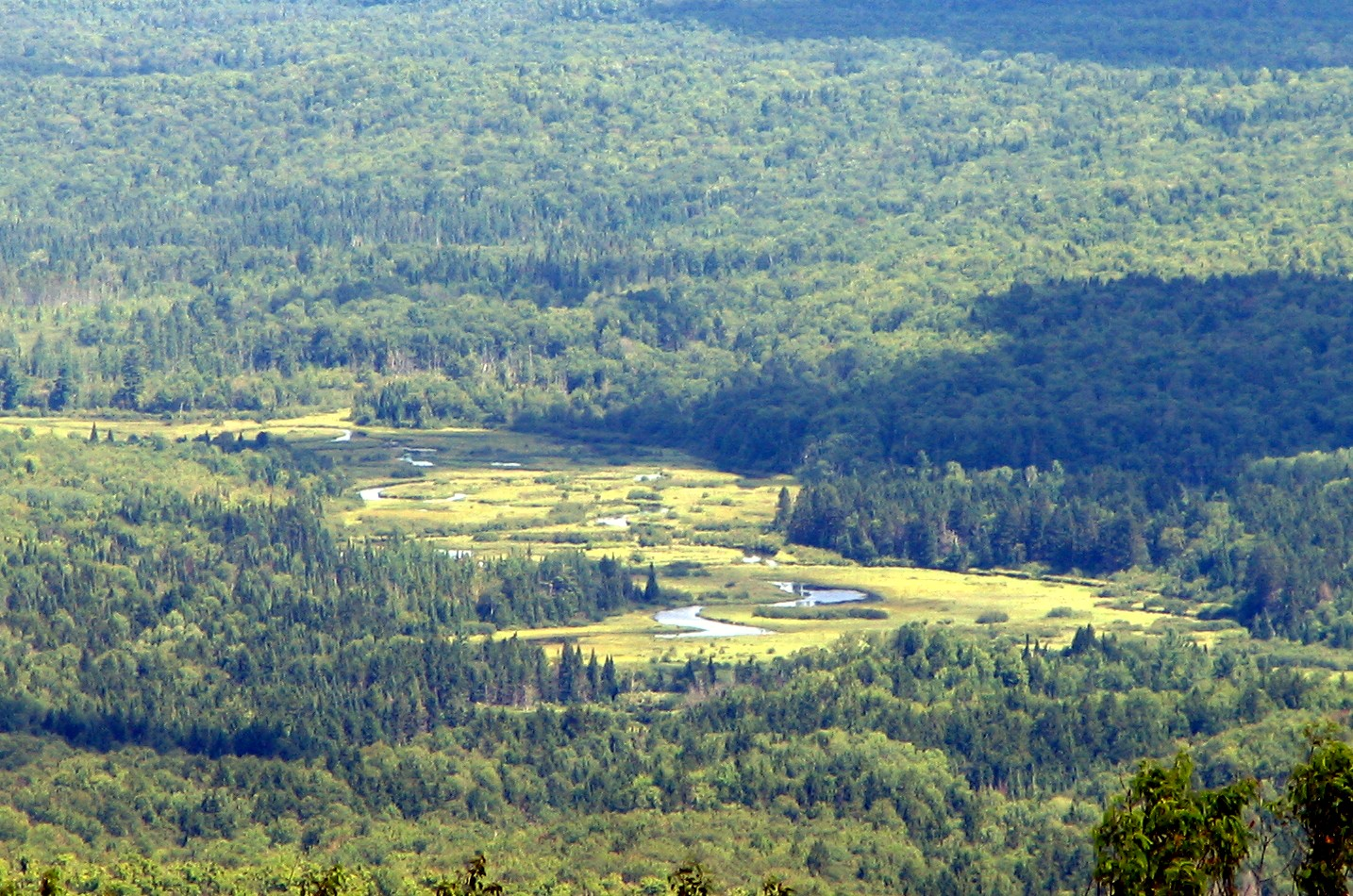
View of the St. Regis River from the Azure Mountain fire tower

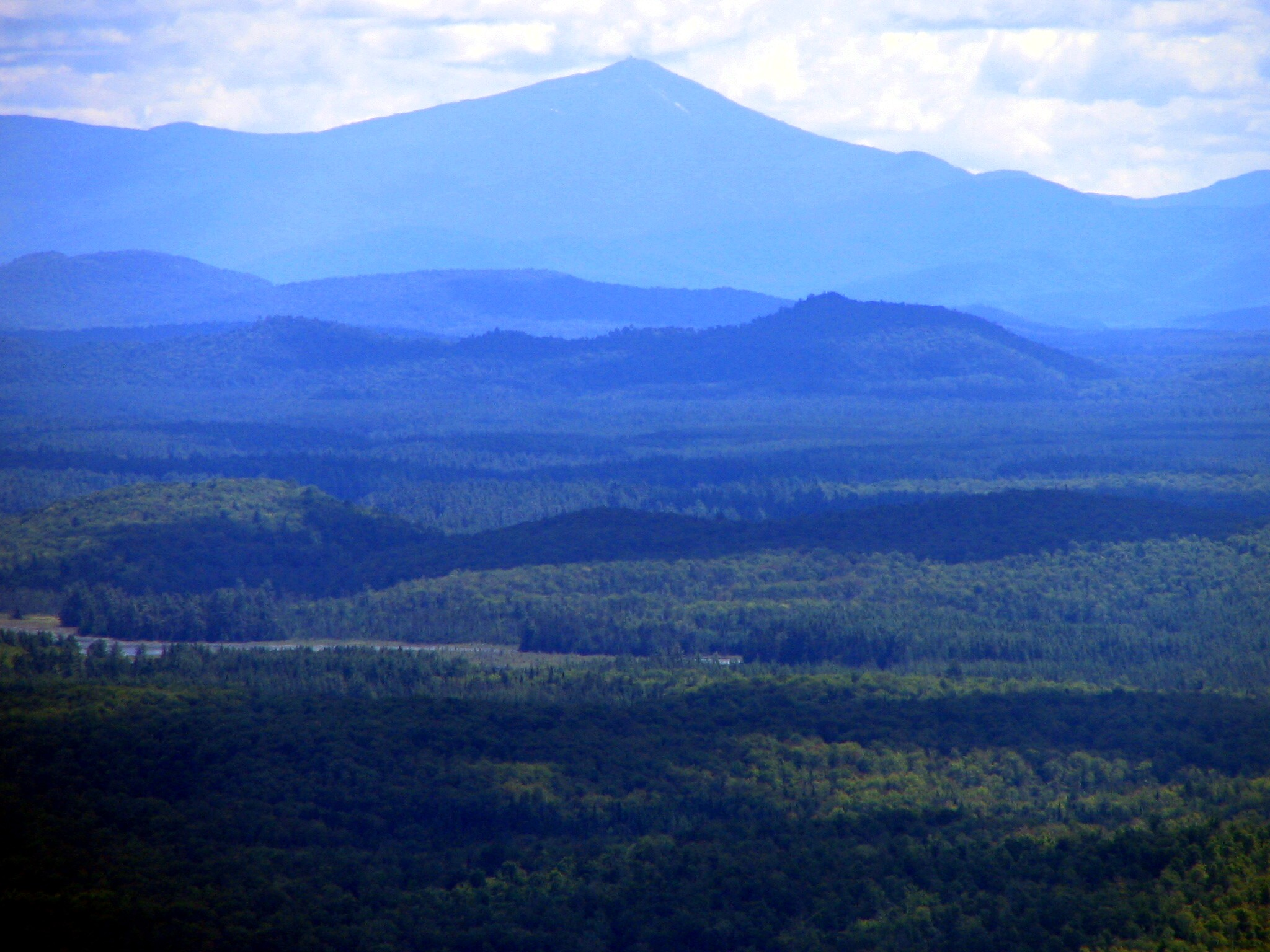
Whiteface Mountain from Azure Mountain
