= Hopkinton, New York =

- Town
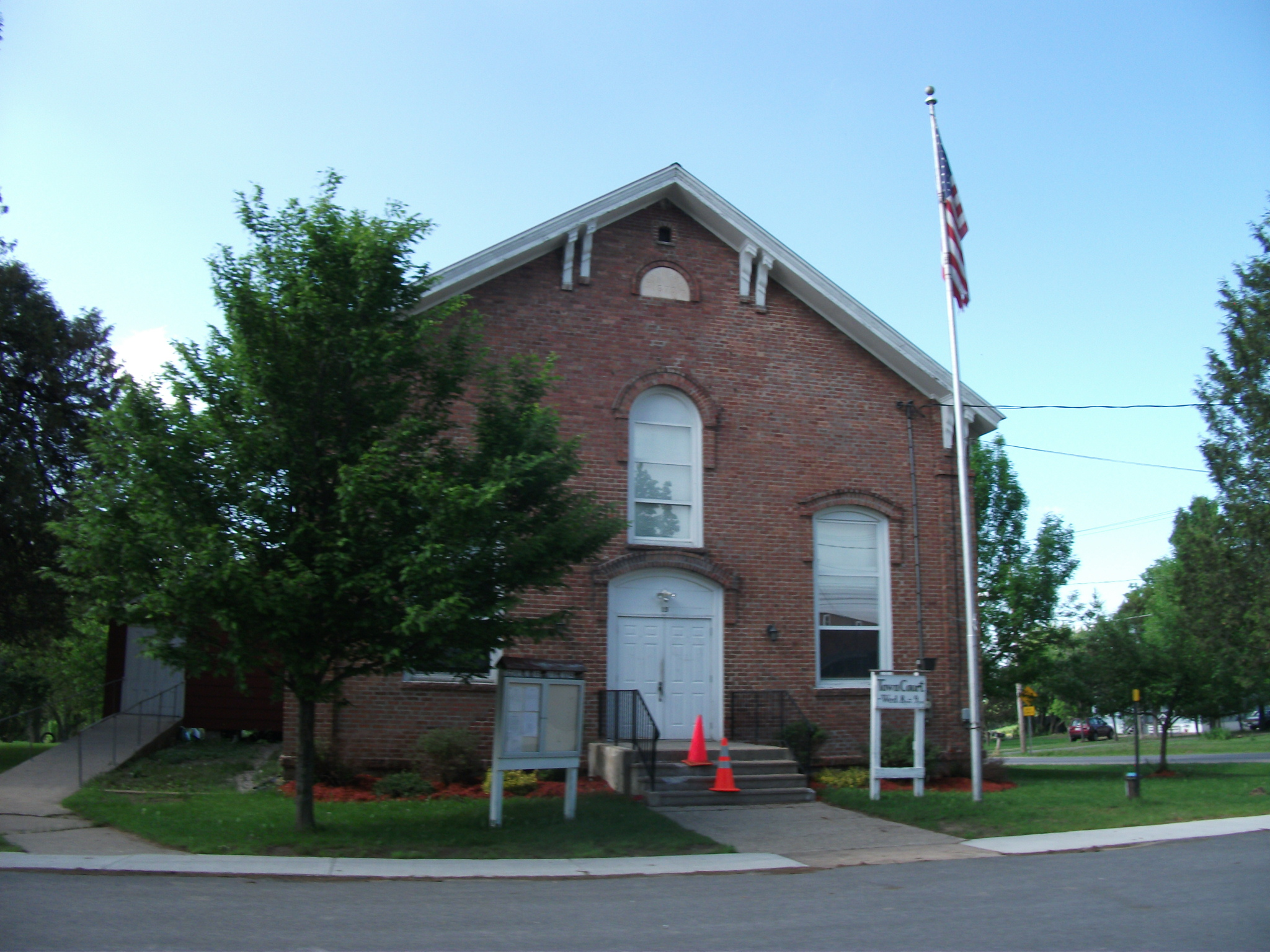
- Town Court, May 2011
- Motto: A Nice Place To Come Home To
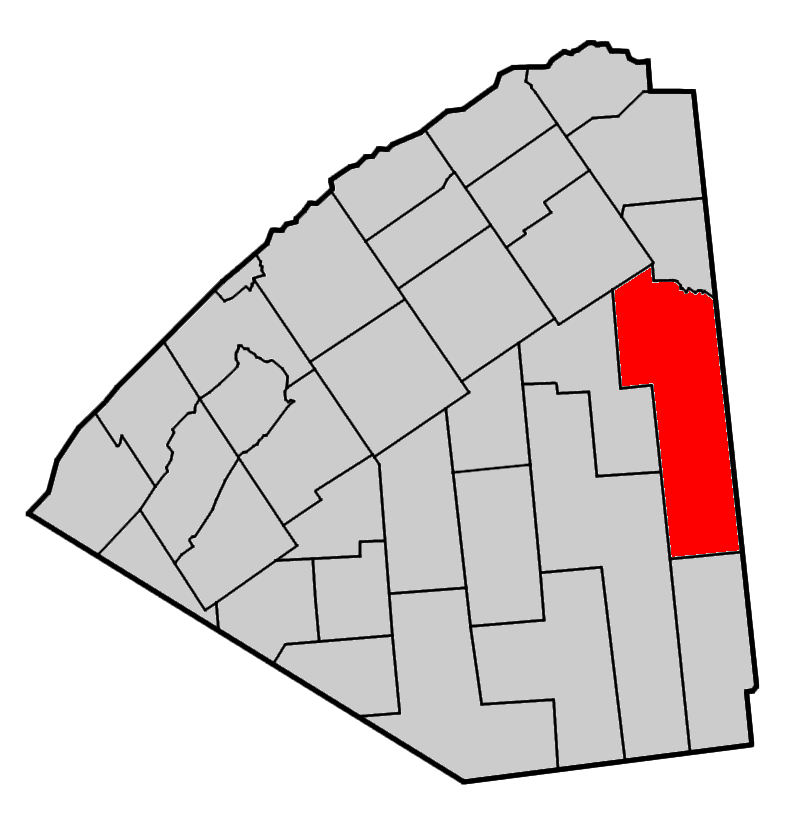
- Map highlighting Hopkinton's location within St. Lawrence County.

- Location within the state of New York
- Coordinates: 44°38′18″N 74°42′31″W
- Country: United States
- State: New York
- County: St. Lawrence

Area
  - Total: 187.04 sq mi (484.44 km^{2})
  - Land: 185.34 sq mi (480.03 km^{2})
  - Water: 1.70 sq mi (4.41 km^{2})
- Elevation: 1,273 ft (388 m)

Population (2020)
  - Total: 1,105
  - Density: 6.0/sq mi (2.3/km^{2})
- Time zone: UTC-5 (Eastern (EST))
  - Summer (DST): UTC-4 (EDT)
- FIPS code: 36-35595
- GNIS feature ID: 0979075
- Website: Town website

Hopkinton is a town in St. Lawrence County, New York, United States. The population was 1,105 at the 2020 census and has a Population density of 5.9 square miles. The town is named for Roswell Hopkins, a pioneer settler and a government official.

The Town of Hopkinton is located in the Southeast corner of St. Law. Co., east of Parishville, north of Piercefield, south of Lawrence, northeast of Colton, southwest of Stockholm, and west of Franklin County. The town is located on the foothills of the Adirondack Mountains.

== History ==
The first recorded settlers arrived around 1802, becoming the fifth town in Saint Lawrence County. The town was named for founder Roswell Hopkins, and was first organized from part of Massena town March 2, 1805. This town was much larger than the present town, having lost territory on the formation of newer towns of the county, including: Russell (1807), Parishville (1814), Lawrence (1828), and Piercefield (1900) which towns were themselves partitioned as boundary adjustments were made over time. In February 1814, British Troops Raided the village and seized 300 barrels of flour of U.S. Gov.

== Geography ==
According to the United States Census Bureau, the town has a total area of 187.0 square miles (484 km^{2}), of which 185.4 square miles (480 km^{2}) is land and 1.6 square miles (4.1 km^{2}) (0.87%) is water.

The eastern town line is the border of Franklin County. Most of the town, the southern section, is inside the Adirondack Park. This part of New York was sometimes called the South Woods, and embraced the less developed areas of the Adirondack Mountains.

The St. Regis River flows through the northern part of the town.

New York State Route 11B and New York State Route 72 intersect near Hopkinton village. New York State Route 458 intersects NY-11B west of Nicholville.

== Demographics ==
Historical population
Census	Pop.	Note	%±
1810	372		—
1820	581		56.2%
1830	827		42.3%
1840	1,147		38.7%
1850	1,476		28.7%
1860	1,990		34.8%
1870	1,907		−4.2%
1880	1,922		0.8%
1890	1,832		−4.7%
1900	2,521		37.6%
1910	1,469		−41.7%
1920	1,244		−15.3%
1930	1,046		−15.9%
1940	1,044		−0.2%
1950	935		−10.4%
1960	1,032		10.4%
1970	884		−14.3%
1980	1,064		20.4%
1990	957		−10.1%
2000	1,020		6.6%
2010	1,077		5.6%
2020	1,105		2.6%
U.S. Decennial Census

As of the census of 2000, there were 1,020 people, 390 households, and 287 families residing in the town. The population density was 5.5 inhabitants per square mile (2.1/km^{2}). There were 639 housing units at an average density of 3.4 per square mile (1.3/km^{2}). The racial makeup of the town was 98.82% White, 0.10% African American, 0.59% Native American, and 0.49% from two or more races. Hispanic or Latino of any race were 0.59% of the population.

There were 390 households, out of which 33.6% had children under the age of 18 living with them, 58.7% were married couples living together, 8.2% had a female householder with no husband present, and 26.2% were non-families. 18.2% of all households were made up of individuals, and 7.7% had someone living alone who was 65 years of age or older. The average household size was 2.62 and the average family size was 2.92.

In the town, the population was spread out, with 27.0% under the age of 18, 7.6% from 18 to 24, 29.8% from 25 to 44, 24.9% from 45 to 64, and 10.7% who were 65 years of age or older. The median age was 36 years. For every 100 females, there were 102.8 males. For every 100 females age 18 and over, there were 104.1 males.

The median income for a household in the town was $31,750, and the median income for a family was $34,205. Males had a median income of $32,125 versus $19,545 for females. The per capita income for the town was $13,901. About 15.3% of families and 17.6% of the population were below the poverty line, including 26.6% of those under age 18 and 11.8% of those age 65 or over.

== Communities ==
- Catherineville – A hamlet near the western town line.
- Fort Jackson – A hamlet by the northern town line, on County Road 49. It was founded circa 1814 by the construction of a mill on the St. Regis River.
- Hopkinton – The hamlet of Hopkinton is in the northwestern part of the town, located on NY-11B at County Road 49. It was founded around 1803 by the construction of a mill by Roswell Hopkins. The Hopkinton Green Historic District was listed on the National Register of Historic Places in 2013.
- Lake Ozonia – A hamlet on the northern end of Lake Ozonia.
- Nicholville – A hamlet on the northern town line, located on NY-11B at the junction of County Road 55. The community is primarily in the Town of Lawrence.

== Points of interest ==
- Amber Lake – A small lake in the southern part of Hopkinton.
- Jordan Lake – A small lake in the southern part of the town.
- Lake Ozonia – a lake by the eastern town line, inside the Adirondack Park, and originally called "Trout Lake."
- Sylvan Falls – a segmented block waterfall with a 20 foot drop located on the St. Regis River West Branch.
- Hopkinton Historical Museum – A restored Victorian house on the Village Green.
- Hopkinton Library - The library in the Town of Hopkinton.
