= St. Regis Falls, New York =

- Census-designated place
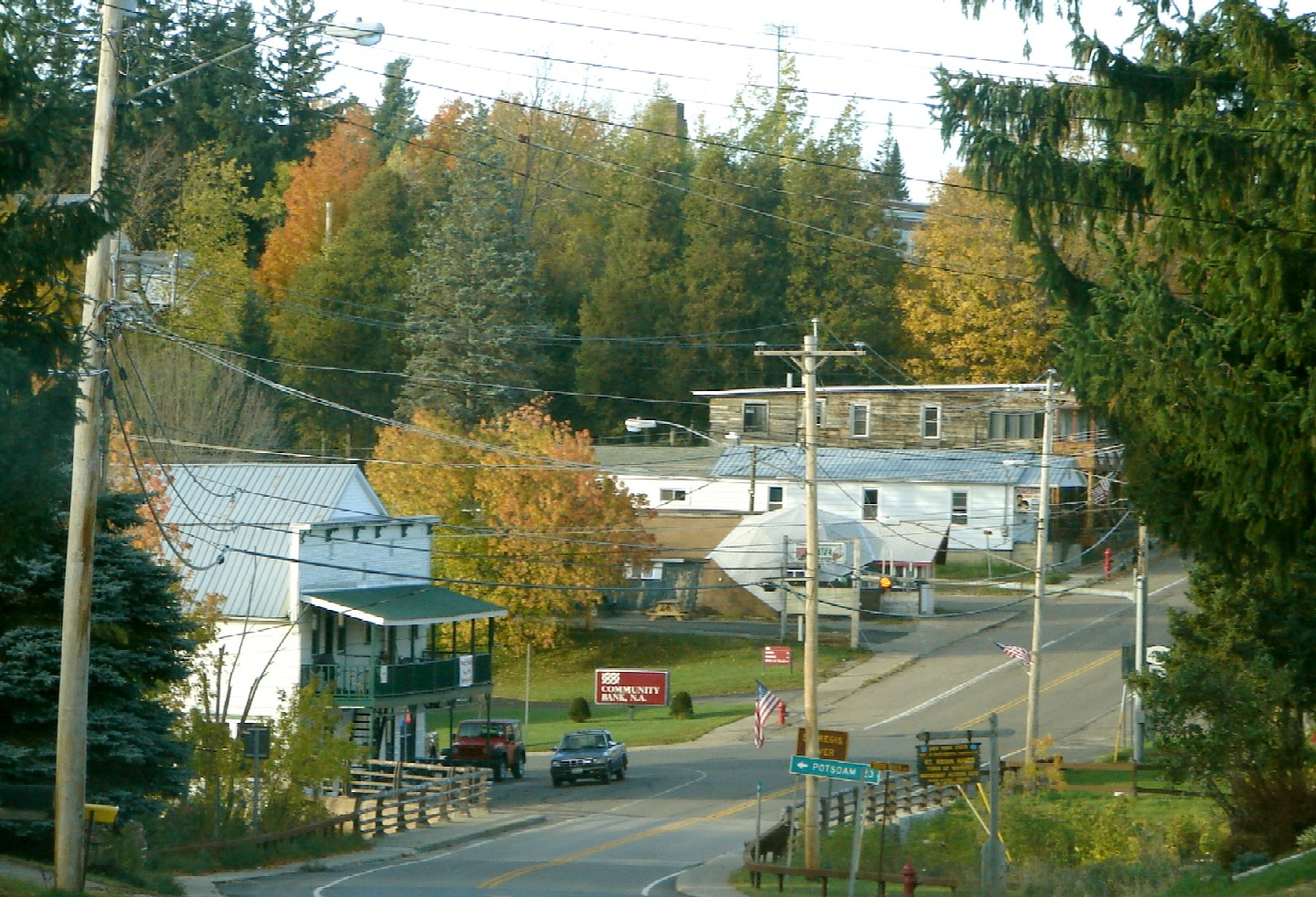

- Location within the state of New York
- Coordinates: 44°40′26″N 74°32′41″W
- Country: United States
- State: New York
- County: Franklin
- Town: Waverly

Area
  - Total: 1.29 sq mi (3.35 km^{2})
  - Land: 1.29 sq mi (3.35 km^{2})
  - Water: 0 sq mi (0.00 km^{2})
- Elevation: 1,291 ft (393 m)

Population (2020)
  - Total: 432
  - Density: 334.4/sq mi (129.13/km^{2})
- Time zone: UTC-5 (Eastern (EST))
  - Summer (DST): UTC-4 (EDT)
- ZIP code: 12980
- Area code: 518
- FIPS code: 36-64716
- GNIS feature ID: 2628185

St. Regis Falls is a census-designated place (CDP) in Waverly, Franklin County, New York, United States. As of the 2020 census, St. Regis Falls had a population of 432.

== Geography ==
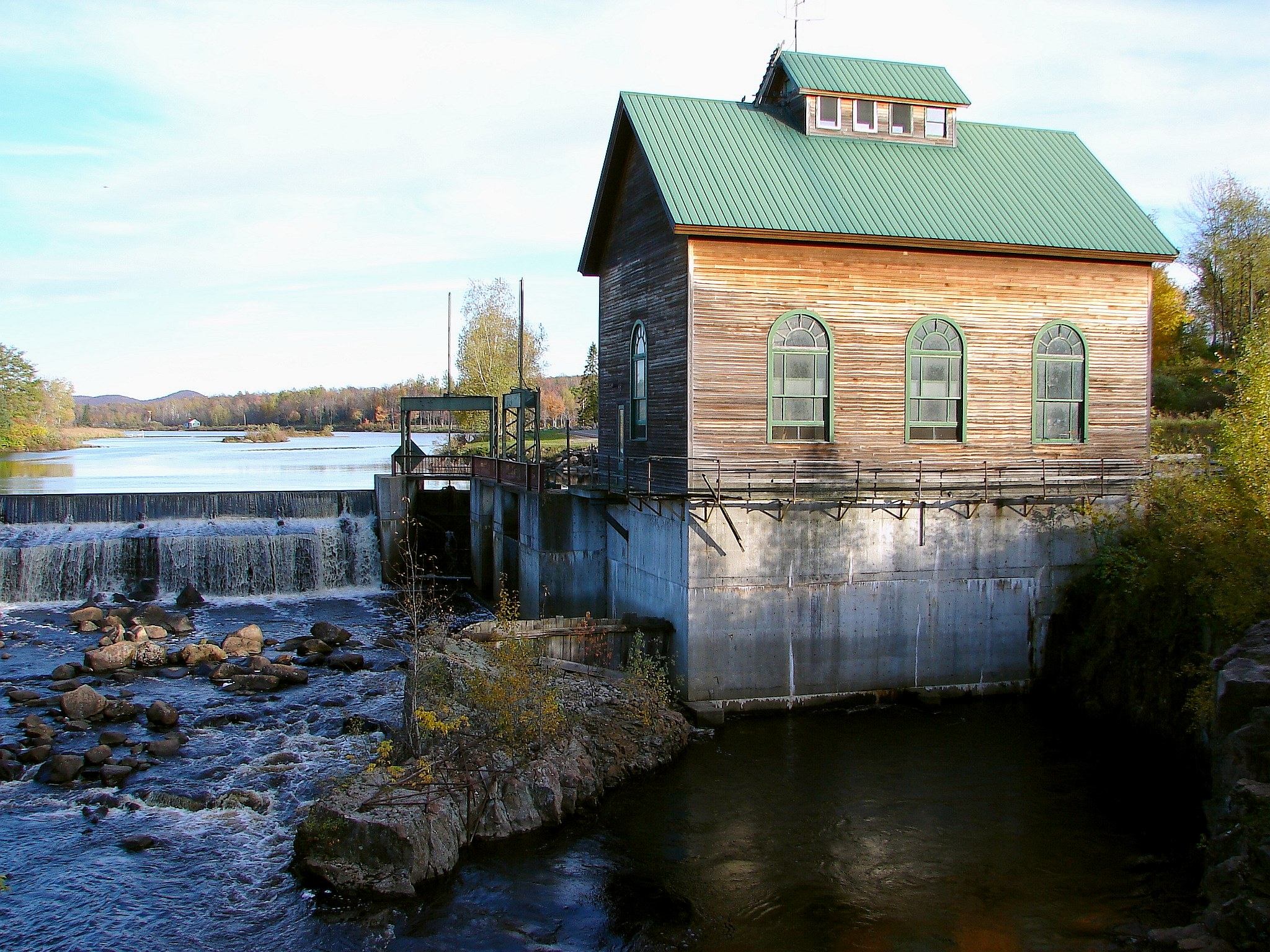
St. Regis River in St. Regis Falls

St. Regis Falls is located at the northern end of the town of Waverly, along the north side of the St. Regis River, a tributary of the St. Lawrence River. The falls for which the community is named are on the river at the western end of town. According to the United States Census Bureau, the CDP has a total area of 1.29 square miles (3.35 km^{2}), all land.

New York State Route 458 passes through the community, leading west 8 miles (13 km) to Nicholville and southeast 6.5 miles (10.5 km) to Santa Clara. Potsdam is 23 miles (37 km) to the west via Routes 458 and 11B, while Paul Smiths is 26 miles (42 km) to the southeast via Routes 458 and 30.

The northern border of the CDP follows the Waverly/Dickinson town line.

Saint Regis Falls Central School is located in the northern part of the CDP, serving the town of Waverly and surrounding towns.

The marshy area east of the village where the water meets Duane Street (Red Tavern Road) on both sides just before Trim Hill is often referred to as Alligator Alley.

== Demographics ==
Historical population
Census	Pop.	Note	%±
2020	432		—
U.S. Decennial Census

== Education ==
The school district is St. Regis Falls Central School District.
