= Lake Kushaqua =

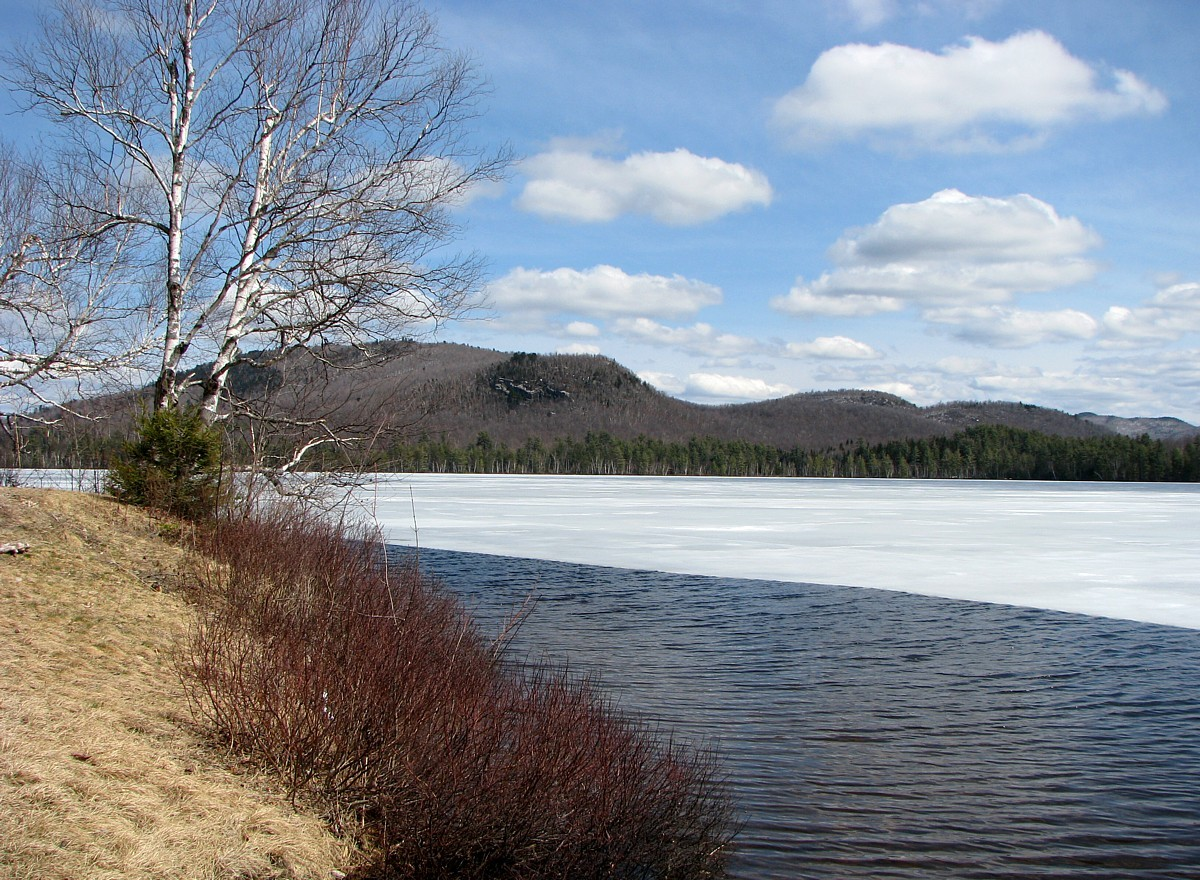
- Lake Kushaqua, looking east from near the site of the former Kushaqua Sanatorium

- Location within New York Location within the United States
- Location: Franklin County, New York
- Coordinates: 44.520°N 74.112°W
- Type: Lake
- Surface area: 380 acres (150 ha)
- Surface elevation: 1,670 feet (510 m)

Lake Kushaqua is a 380-acre (150 ha) lake near Loon Lake and Rainbow Lake in the town of Franklin, New York state. It is on the North Branch of the Saranac River. The shoreline is state owned except for two small inholdings. The New York State Department of Environmental Conservation operates a campground on Kushaqua and nearby Buck Pond.

It was the site of the Lake Kushaqua Hotel, built in 1893, which was one of the first hotels in the Adirondacks with electric lighting. It was accessible via the Chateaugay Railroad and the Adirondack Division of the New York Central Railroad, which passed the lake on either side.

In 1901, the Stony Wold Sanatorium was built on 1800 acres bordering the lake.

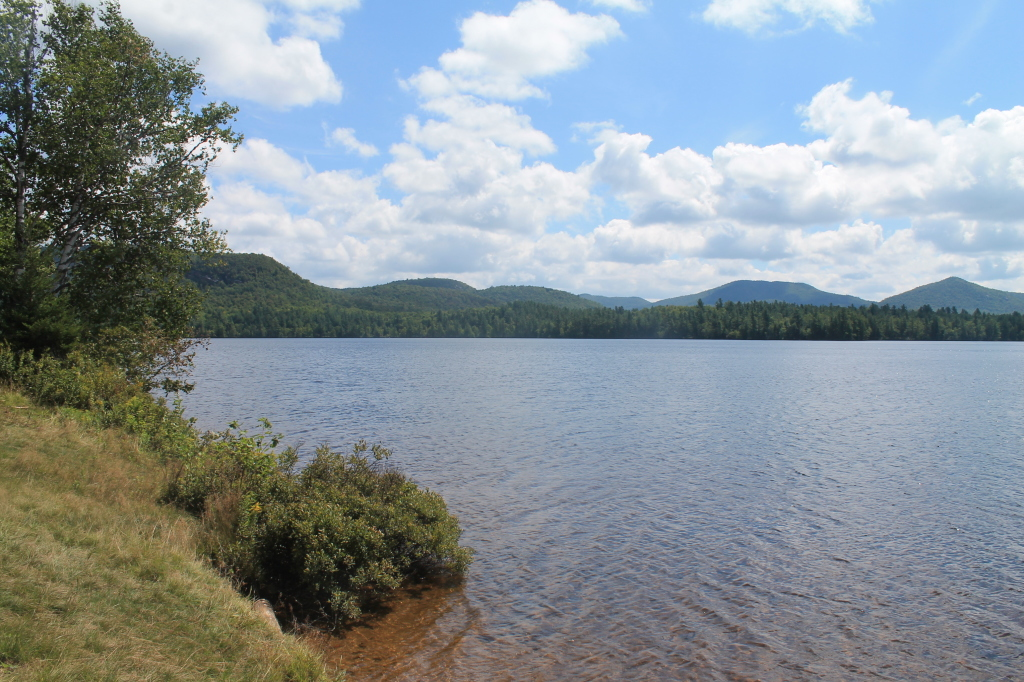
Lake Kushaqua in 2012

The rail bed of the Delaware and Hudson line runs along the eastern shore of the lake, past the Buck Pond campground, and that of the Adirondack Division of the New York Central Railroad runs along the western shore past the remaining buildings of Stony Wold: the chapel and two cottages on the lake shore. When it was built, the 1,200 acres (490 ha) sanatorium property included all of Lake Kushaqua and nearby Buck Pond, purchased in 1901 for $20,000. When the sanatorium closed in the 1950s, it was given to the White Fathers of Africa; they sold it to the state in 1970, after which the huge main building, laundry and power plant were destroyed.
