= Meacham Lake =

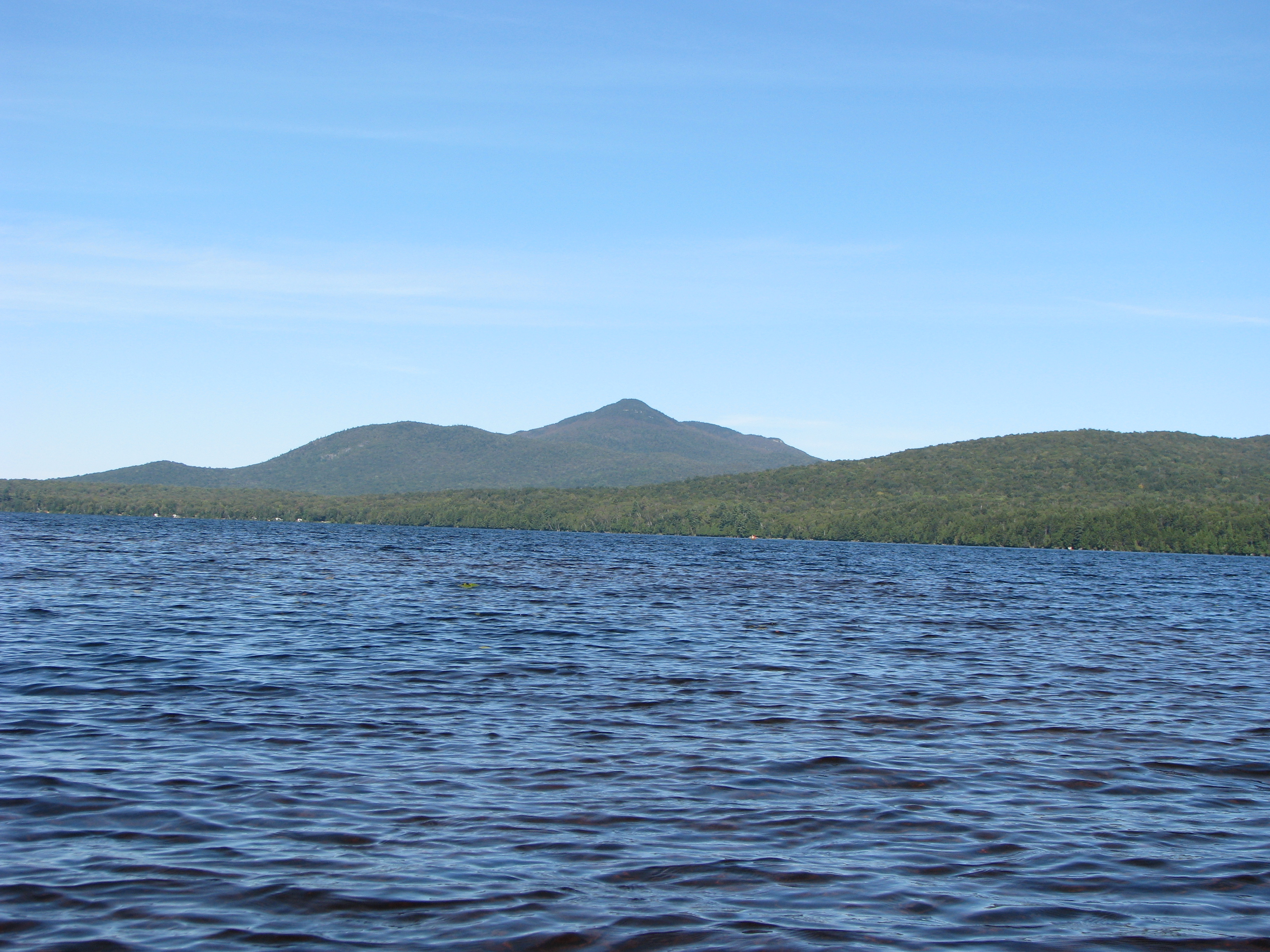
- Meacham Lake looking north from near the south shore, DeBar Mountain is on the horizon

- Location within New York Location within the United States
- Location: Franklin County, New York
- Coordinates: 44°33′36″N 74°17′10″W
- Type: lake
- Basin countries: United States
- Surface area: 1,202 acres (4.86 km^{2})
- Surface elevation: 1,552 ft (473 m)

Meacham Lake is a 1,203-acre (4.87 km^{2}) lake eight miles north of Paul Smiths in Franklin County, New York in the Adirondack Park. It is 2 miles (3.2 km) long, north to south, and 1 mile (1.6 km) wide. The lake is found at an elevation of 1,552 feet (473 m). Most of the lake is in the town of Duane; the southernmost shore is in the town of Brighton.

The state purchased most of the land around the lake in 1931-32, and it is a part of the Debar Mountain Wild Forest; motors are permitted on the lake. There is a campground operated by the New York State Department of Environmental Conservation at the north end of the lake. Fish include northern pike, yellow perch, and bullhead.

The Osgood River, flowing north out of Osgood Pond is the principal source of Meacham Lake; it is drained by the East Branch of the St. Regis River.

The lake was originally discovered by the late Thomas Meacham.

== Sources ==
- Paul Jamieson and Donald Morris, Adirondack Canoe Waters, North Flow, pp. 142, 149-150. Lake George, NY: Adirondack Mountain Club, 1987. ISBN 0-935272-43-7
