= Waverly, Franklin County, New York =

- Town
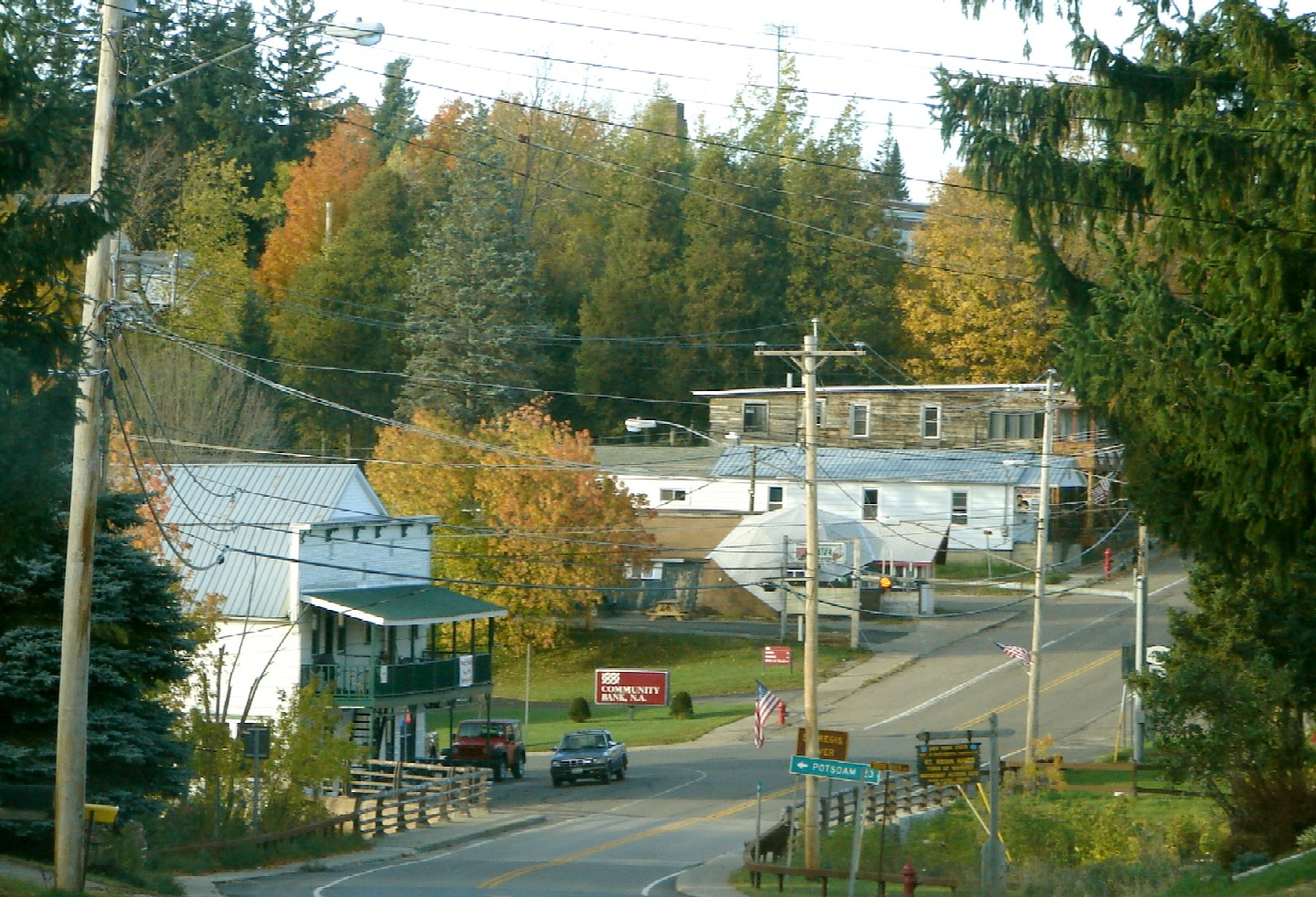
- Hamlet of St. Regis Falls within Waverly

- Location within New York
- Coordinates: 44°35′32″N 74°31′20″W
- Country: United States
- State: New York
- County: Franklin

Government
  - Type: Town Council
  - Town Supervisor: Chad E. Rivers (R)
  - Town Council: Members' List: • Cynthia Chesbrough Durant (D) 2018; • William Labounty (D) 2018; • Ronald Chapman (R) 2016; • Howard Butch Goodrow (R) 2016

Area
  - Total: 126.4 sq mi (327.4 km^{2})
  - Land: 125.1 sq mi (324.0 km^{2})
  - Water: 1.3 sq mi (3.4 km^{2})
- Elevation: 1,429 ft (436 m)

Population (2010)
  - Total: 1,022
  - Density: 8.3/sq mi (3.2/km^{2})
- Time zone: Eastern (EST)
- ZIP Code: 12980 (Saint Regis Falls)
- FIPS code: 36-033-78795
- GNIS feature ID: 979608
- Website: https://www.townofwaverlyny.org/

Waverly is a town in Franklin County, New York, United States. The population was 1,022 at the 2010 census. The town is on the western border of the county, southwest of Malone.

== History ==
The town of Waverly was formed in 1880 from part of the town of Dickinson. Half its area was lost to the town of Altamont (the present-day town of Tupper Lake) in 1890. The St. Regis Falls area was a major lumber producer, and the Northern Adirondack Railroad was built from Moira, connecting the area to the Ogdensburg and Lake Champlain Railroad.

The Azure Mountain Fire Observation Station was listed on the National Register of Historic Places in 2001.

== Geography ==
According to the United States Census Bureau, the town has a total area of 126.4 square miles (327.4 km^{2}), of which 125.1 square miles (324.0 km^{2}) is land and 1.3 square miles (3.4 km^{2}), or 1.02%, is water.

The western town line is the border of St. Lawrence County. The town is within the Adirondack Park. The St. Regis River flows through the northern part of the town, past the hamlet of St. Regis Falls, the largest settlement in the town.

New York State Route 458 is an east–west highway through the northern section of the town.

== Demographics ==
Historical population
Census	Pop.	Note	%±
1890	2,270		—
1900	1,615		−28.9%
1910	2,170		34.4%
1920	1,695		−21.9%
1930	1,337		−21.1%
1940	1,017		−23.9%
1950	979		−3.7%
1960	1,050		7.3%
1970	1,022		−2.7%
1980	1,110		8.6%
1990	1,068		−3.8%
2000	1,118		4.7%
2010	1,022		−8.6%
2020	963		−5.8%
U.S. Decennial Census

As of the census of 2000, there were 1,118 people, 449 households, and 294 families residing in the town. The population density was 8.9 inhabitants per square mile (3.4/km^{2}). There were 854 housing units at an average density of 6.8 per square mile (2.6/km^{2}). The racial makeup of the town was 99.19% White, 0.27% Native American, and 0.54% from two or more races. Hispanic or Latino of any race were 0.27% of the population.

There were 449 households, out of which 31.2% had children under the age of 18 living with them, 48.8% were married couples living together, 10.7% had a female householder with no husband present, and 34.5% were non-families. 26.7% of all households were made up of individuals, and 14.5% had someone living alone who was 65 years of age or older. The average household size was 2.49 and the average family size was 3.04.

In the town, the population was spread out, with 26.5% under the age of 18, 7.6% from 18 to 24, 28.7% from 25 to 44, 21.6% from 45 to 64, and 15.7% who were 65 years of age or older. The median age was 38 years. For every 100 females, there were 101.8 males. For every 100 females age 18 and over, there were 96.7 males.

The median income for a household in the town was $26,591, and the median income for a family was $31,875. Males had a median income of $29,688 versus $18,750 for females. The per capita income for the town was $14,023. About 12.2% of families and 15.6% of the population were below the poverty line, including 21.7% of those under age 18 and 21.6% of those age 65 or over.

== Communities and locations in Waverly ==
- St. Regis Falls — A hamlet on the Saint Regis River.
- Dexter Lake

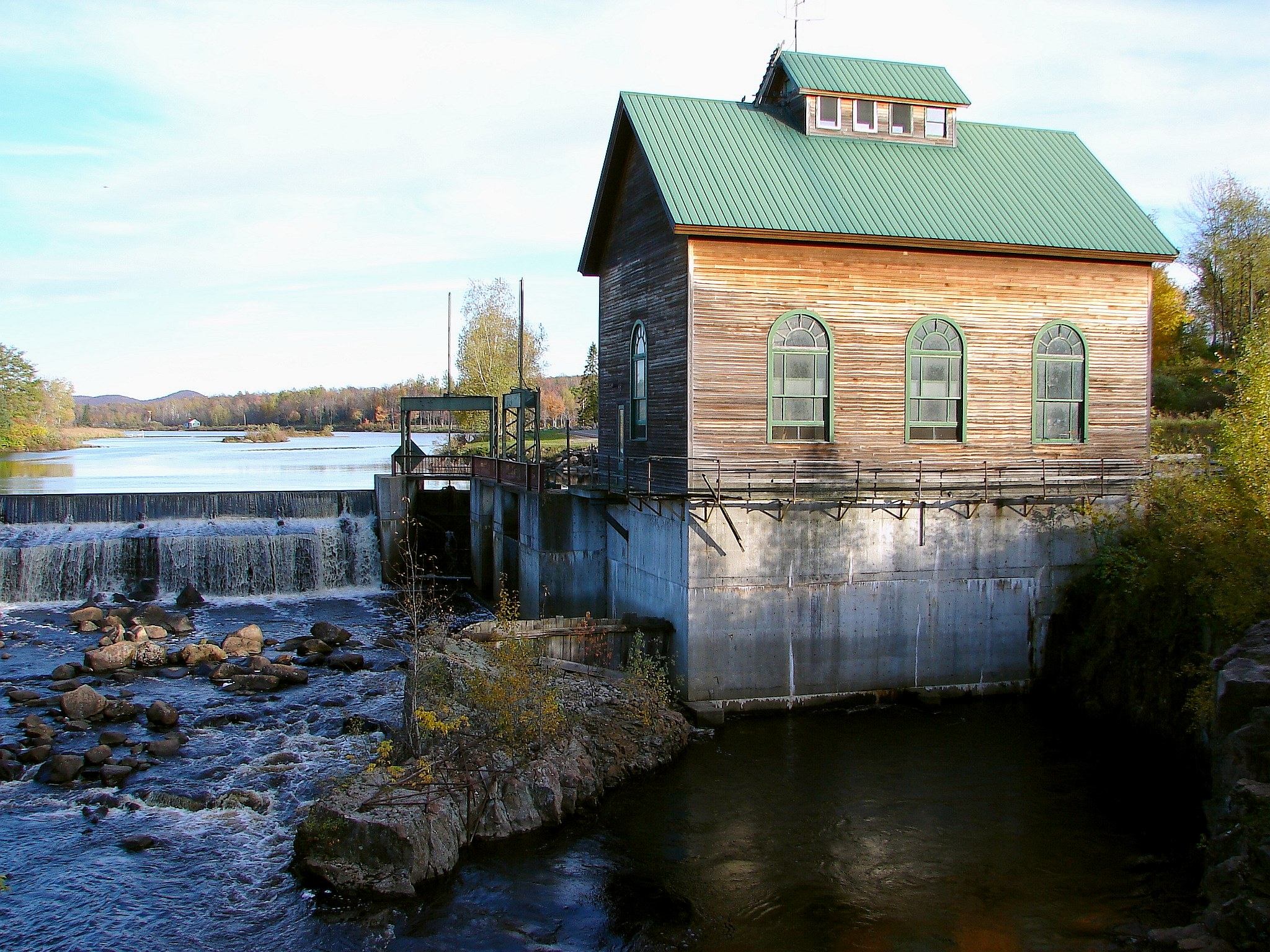
St. Regis River at St. Regis Falls

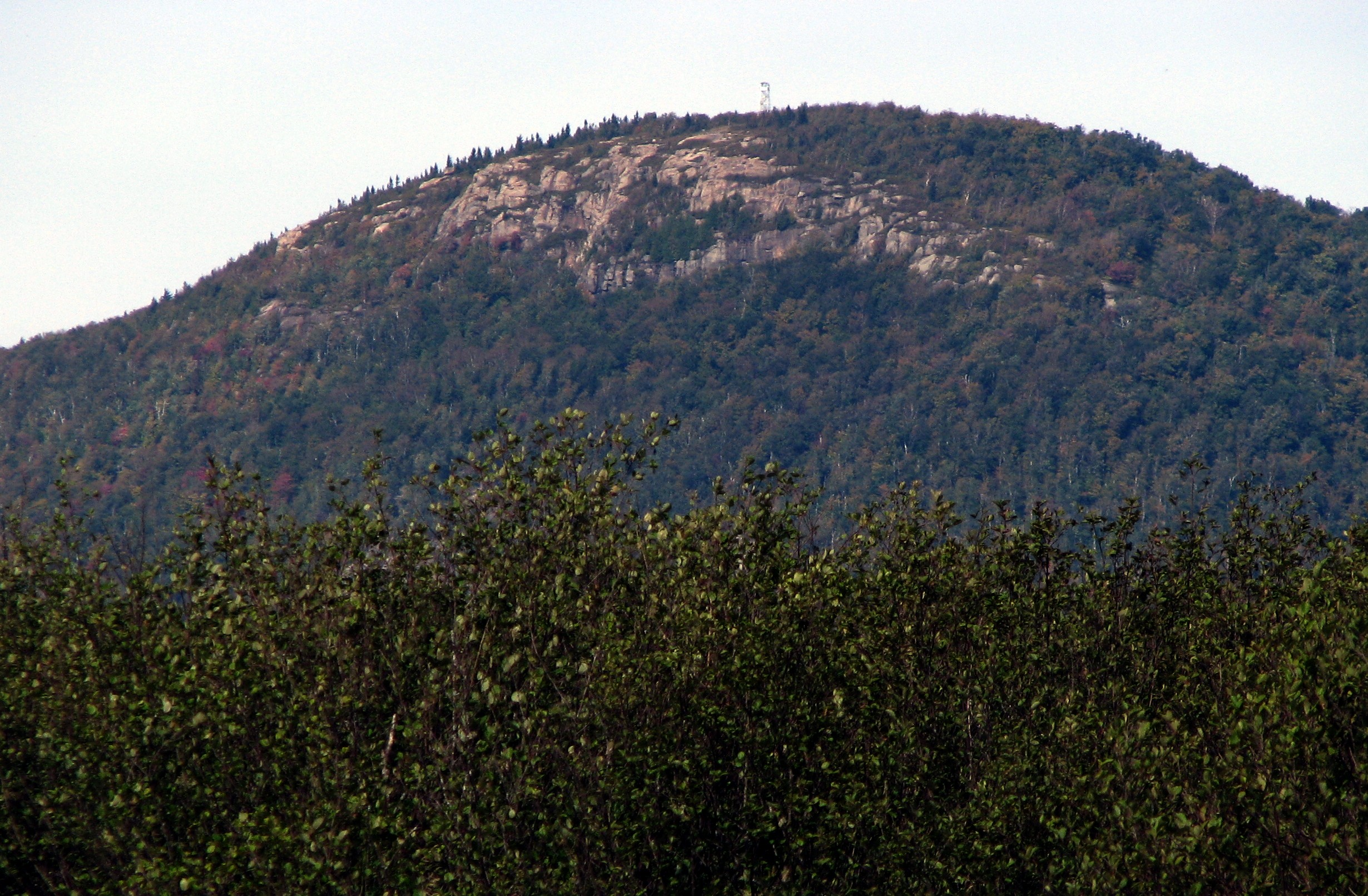
Azure Mountain, Waverly
