= Lawrence, St. Lawrence County, New York =

Lawrence
- Town
- Etymology: Named after William Lawrence, an early land owner
- Interactive map of Lawrence
- Location in New York
- Coordinates: 44°45′31″N 74°40′36″W
- Country: United States
- State: New York
- County: St. Lawrence
- Settled: c. 1800
- Incorporated: 1828

Area
  - Total: 47.7 sq mi (124 km^{2})
  - Land: 47.66 sq mi (123.4 km^{2})
  - Water: 0.04 sq mi (0.10 km^{2})

Population (2020)
  - Total: 1,715
  - Density: 35.98/sq mi (13.89/km^{2})
- Time zone: UTC−5 (Eastern)
  - Summer (DST): UTC-6 (Eastern)

Lawrence is a town in St. Lawrence County, New York, United States. The population was 1,715 at the 2020 census. The town is named after William Lawrence, an early land owner.

The Town of Lawrence is on the eastern border of the county and is east of Potsdam.

== History ==
Settlers began arriving in the region shortly after 1800, but many left permanently to Vermont and New Hampshire during the War of 1812, leaving only five families in the town, who often survived off of venison due to difficulty reclaiming farmland at the time. A state road constructed through the region in 1827 helped renew settlement of Lawrence.

The town was formed in 1828 from parts of the Towns of Brasher and Hopkinton.

== Geography ==
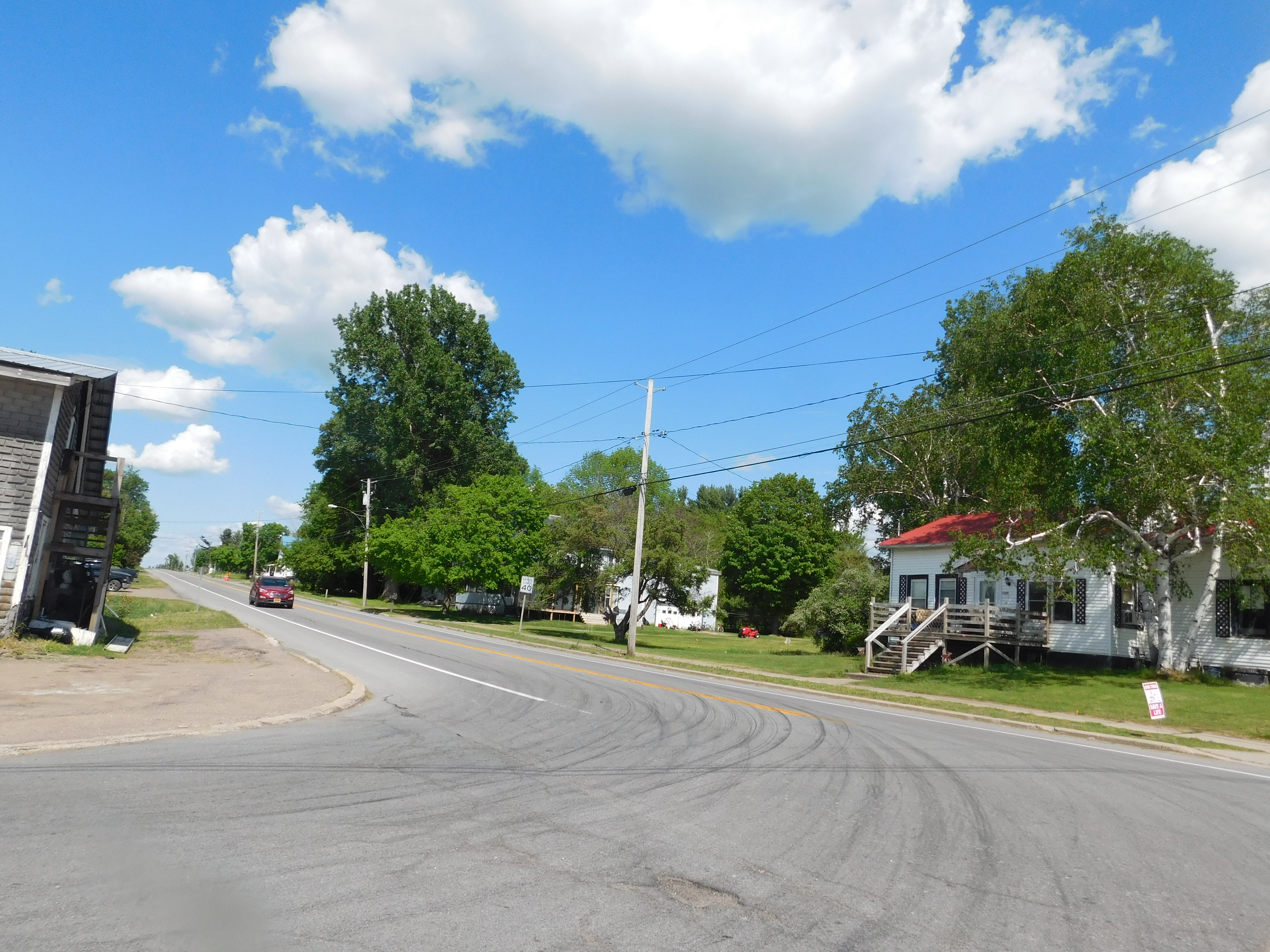
Nicholville along NY Route 11B

According to the United States Census Bureau, the town has a total area of 47.7 square miles (124 km^{2}), of which 47.7 square miles (124 km^{2}) is land and 0.04 square miles (0.10 km^{2}) (0.06%) is water.

The eastern town line is the border of Franklin County.

Deer River flows from the south-east to the north-western part of the town, and the east branch of the St. Regis River flows across the southern part of the town.

U.S. Route 11 and New York State Route 11C are east–west highways. New York State Route 11B cuts across the southeastern corner of the town.

== Noteworthy people ==
- G. Ledyard Stebbins (1906–2000), botanist, geneticist and evolutionary biologist, was born in Lawrence.

== Demographics ==
Historical population
Census	Pop.	Note	%±
1830	1,097		—
1840	1,845		68.2%
1850	2,214		20.0%
1860	2,828		27.7%
1870	2,577		−8.9%
1880	2,483		−3.6%
1890	2,037		−18.0%
1900	1,963		−3.6%
1910	1,676		−14.6%
1920	1,588		−5.3%
1930	1,526		−3.9%
1940	1,431		−6.2%
1950	1,625		13.6%
1960	1,785		9.8%
1970	1,632		−8.6%
1980	1,658		1.6%
1990	1,516		−8.6%
2000	1,545		1.9%
2010	1,826		18.2%
2020	1,715		−6.1%

As of the census of 2010, there were 1,826 people, 649 households, and 390 families residing in the town. The population density was 38.3 inhabitants per square mile (14.8/km^{2}). There were 737 housing units at an average density of 15.5/sq mi (6.0/km^{2}). The racial makeup of the town was 97.48% White, 0.44% Native American, 0.05% Asian, 0.06% from other races, and 0.82% from two or more races. Hispanic or Latino of any race were 0.93% of the population.

In 2000, there were 584 households, out of which 33.0% had children under the age of 18 living with them, 59.2% were married couples living together, 9.4% had a female householder with no husband present, and 25.7% were non-families. 20.0% of all households were made up of individuals, and 7.0% had someone living alone who was 65 years of age or older. The average household size was 2.65 and the average family size was 3.04.

In the town, the population was spread out, with 27.6% under the age of 18, 6.4% from 18 to 24, 27.8% from 25 to 44, 26.5% from 45 to 64, and 11.7% who were 65 years of age or older. The median age was 36 years. For every 100 females, there were 100.4 males. For every 100 females age 18 and over, there were 97.9 males.

The median income for a household in the town was $31,715, and the median income for a family was $35,365. Males had a median income of $34,911 versus $22,375 for females. The per capita income for the town was $13,402. About 12.9% of families and 16.4% of the population were below the poverty line, including 20.6% of those under age 18 and 8.5% of those age 65 or over.

== Communities and locations in Lawrence ==
- Coteys Corner – A hamlet located at the junction of Routes US-ll and NY-llC, west of Lawrenceville on US-11.
- Deer River – A stream in the northeastern part of the town.
- Fort Jackson – A hamlet, which is at County Roads 49 and 51 by the St. Regis River, is primarily in the Town of Hopkinton.
- Laverys Corners – A location west of Lawrenceville on County Road 54 at the junction of County Road 55.
- Lawrenceville – A hamlet by the junction of Routes US-11 and County Roads 54 and 55 is located in the eastern part of the town by the Deer River.
- McEwens Corners – A hamlet west of Lawrenceville on Route 54.
- Nicholville – A hamlet by the St. Regis River at the junction of NY-11B and County Road 55 in the southern part of the town so that a small part of the community is in the Town of Hopkinton. The settlement was originally called "Sodom."
- North Lawrence – A hamlet on NY-11C and County Road 55 near the northern town line. It was first settled around 1827.
- Taylors Corners – A hamlet east of Lawrenceville by the eastern town line.
- Wagstaff Corners – A hamlet at the junction of County Roads 51 and 54 west of Lawrenceville.
