= St. Regis River =

River forming part of the US-CA border between New York and Quebec

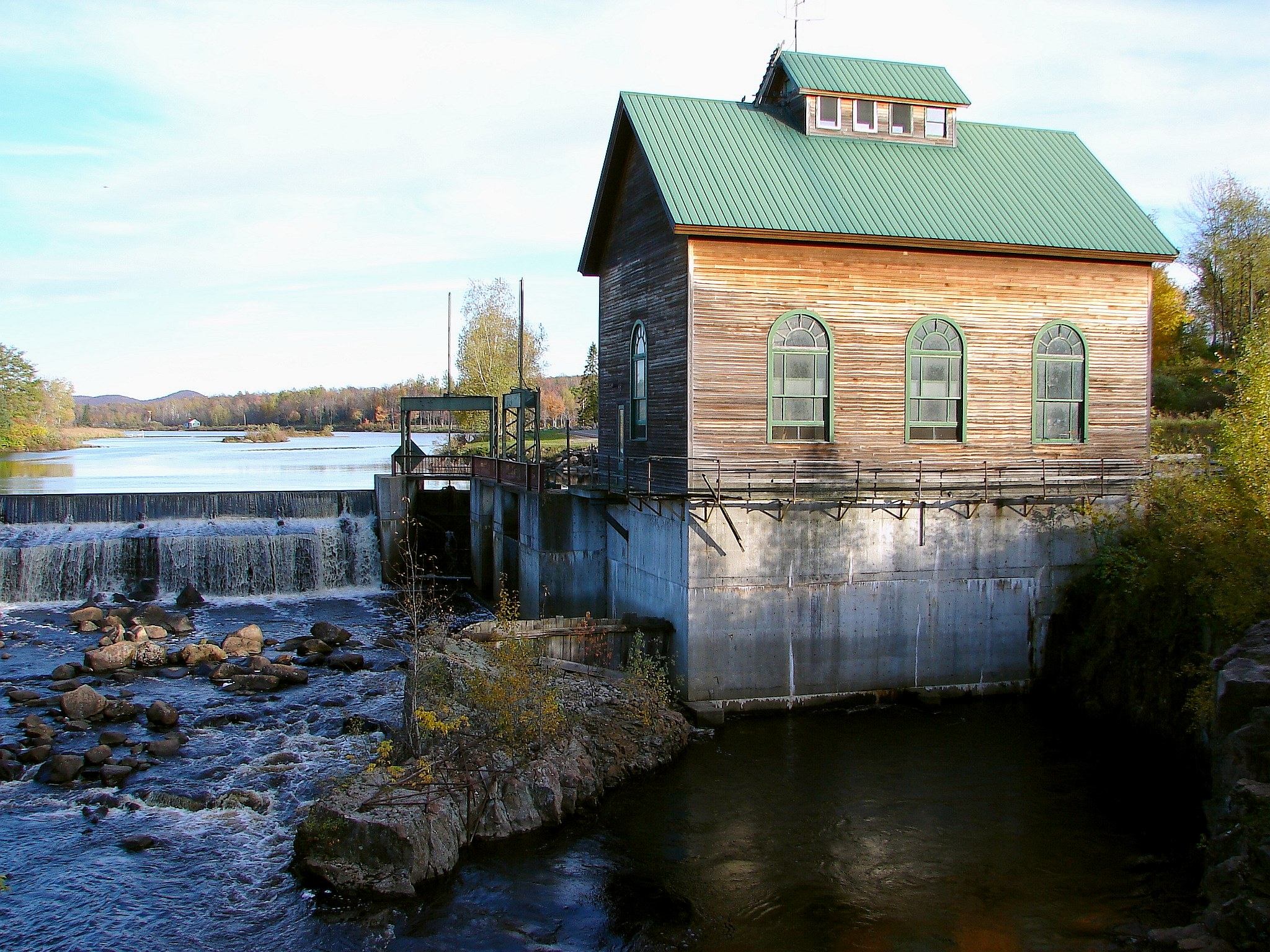
- The river at St. Regis Falls

- Location within the United States

Location
- Country: United States and Canada
- State and province: New York and Quebec
- Administrative region (QC): Montérégie (QC)
- MRC (QC): Le Haut-Saint-Laurent Regional County Municipality (QC)
- Municipality: Akwesasne

Physical characteristics
- Mouth: Saint Lawrence River
  - location: Saint Regis, New York, Franklin County
  - coordinates: 44°59′58.2″N 74°38′28.3″W
  - elevation: 152 ft (46 m)
- Length: 86 mi (138 km)
- Basin size: 860 sq mi (2,200 km^{2})

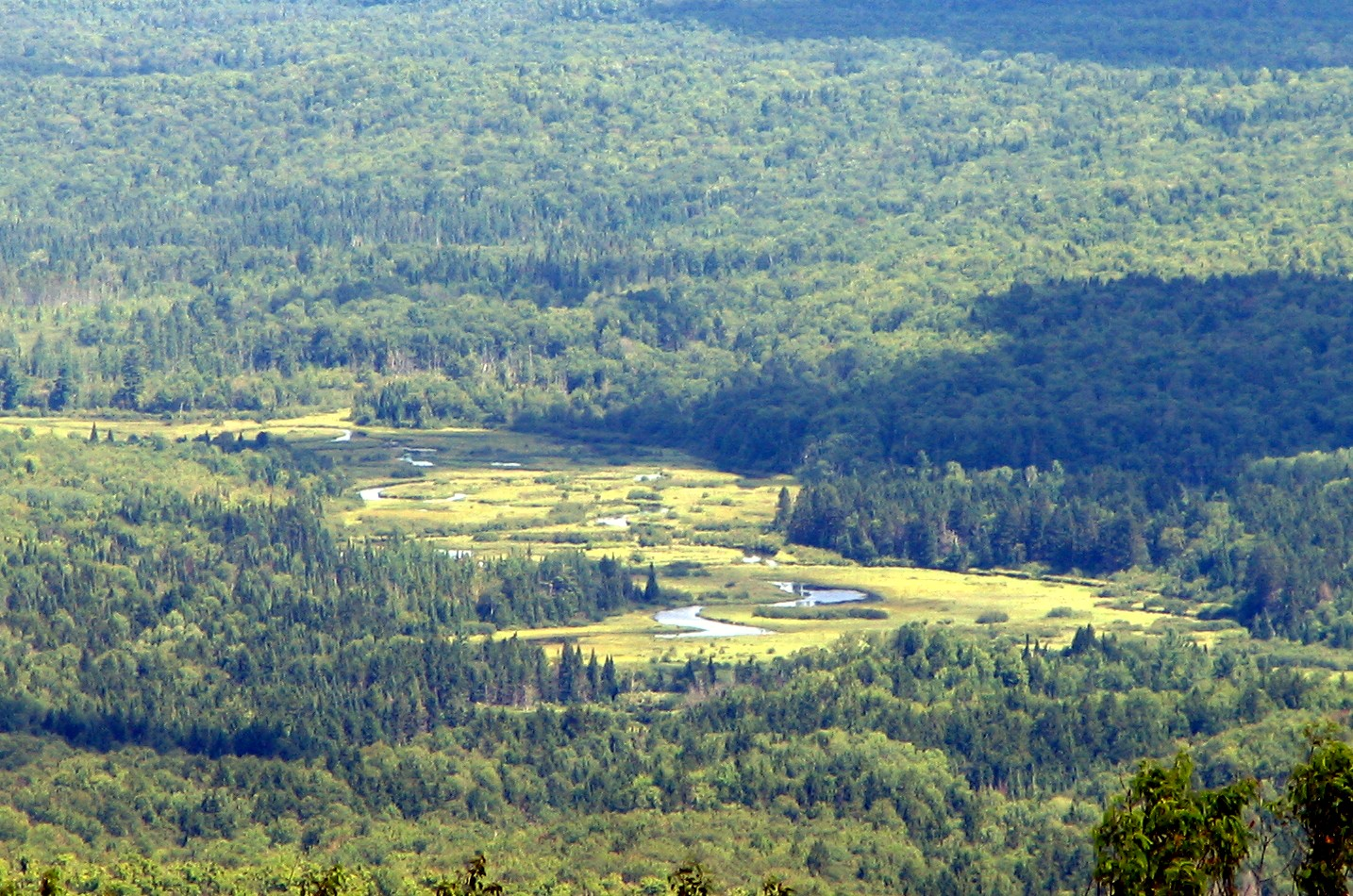
St. Regis River as seen from Azure Mountain, town of Waverly

The St. Regis River (or rivière Saint-Régis in Quebec) is an 86-mile-long (138 km) river in northern New York in the United States. It flows into the Saint Lawrence River at the hamlet of Saint Regis in the St. Regis Mohawk Reservation. The Saint Regis River basin includes Upper and Lower St. Regis Lakes, and Saint Regis Pond in the Saint Regis Canoe Area.

== Toponymy ==
The toponym "rivière Saint-Régis" was made official on December 5, 1968 at the Commission de toponymie du Québec.

== See also ==
- List of rivers in New York
- List of rivers of Quebec
