= List of county routes in Franklin County, New York =

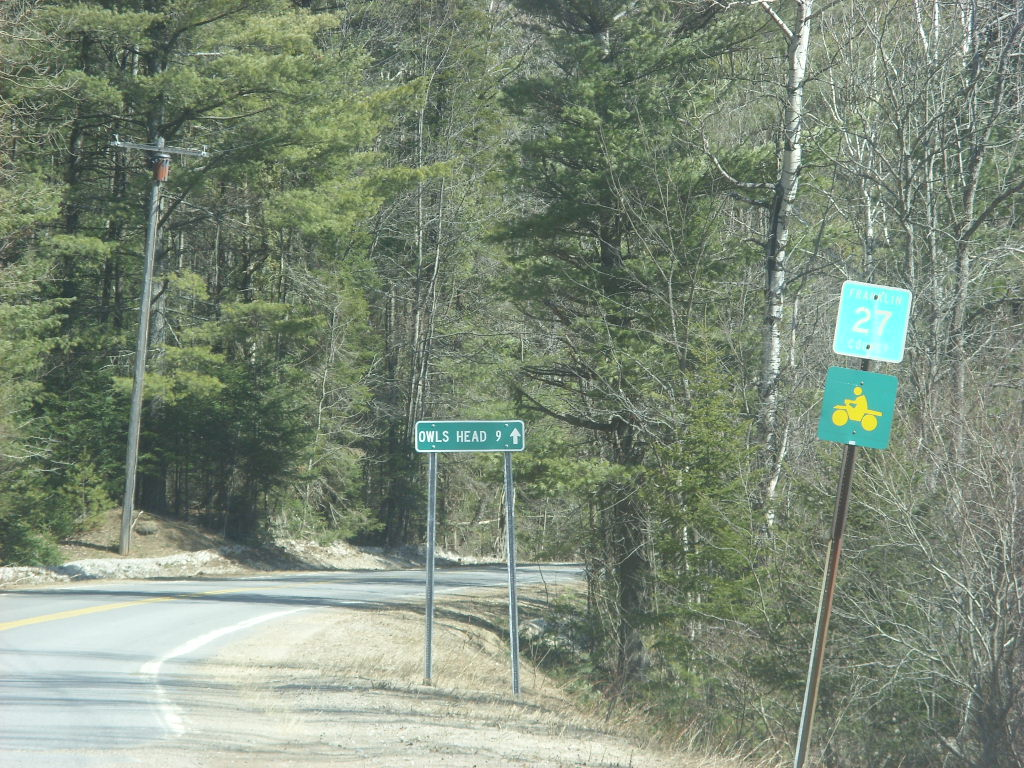
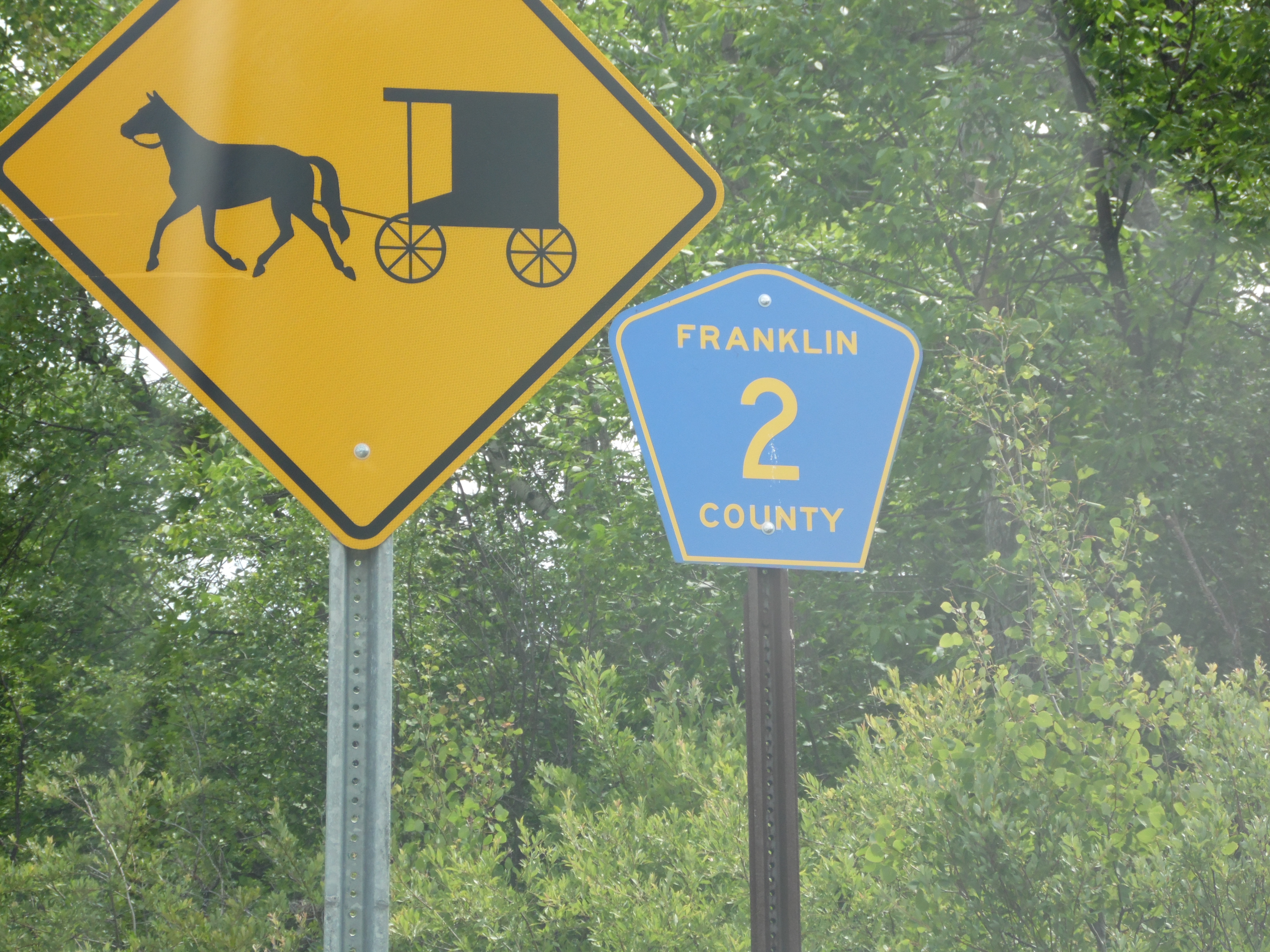
- The former and current standard route marker for county routes in Franklin County.

Highway names
- Interstates: Interstate X (I-X)
- US Highways: U.S. Route X (US X)
- State: New York State Route X (NY X)
- County: County Route X (CR X)

System links
- New York Highways; Interstate; US; State; Reference; Parkways

The Franklin County, New York, Highway Department maintains 266 miles (428 km) of roads as county routes. All county routes in Franklin County are signed with a yellow and blue pentagon. Formerly, the county used a green square marker that was unique to the county. There is no apparent pattern to how routes are assigned; however, no active county route has the same number as any of the county's U.S. Highways or New York state touring routes, with the exception of County Route 3 (CR 3). The section of New York State Route 374 (NY 374) that lies north of U.S. Route 11 (US 11) is owned and maintained by Franklin County and is thus co-signed as a state touring route and as a Franklin County route. The longest route in the county is CR 26, which was once NY 99.

== Routes 1–30 ==
Route	Length (mi)	Length (km)	From	Via	To	Notes
CR 1	4.72	7.60	NY 95 / CR 4 in Bombay	Bombay–Fort Covington Road	NY 37 in Fort Covington	
CR 2	3.21	5.17	NY 95	Townsend Road in Bombay	CR 1	
CR 3	5.48	8.82	CR 8 in Bangor	Cooks Corners Road	CR 4 in Fort Covington	
CR 4	7.80	12.55	NY 95 / CR 1 in Bombay	Coggin Bridge–Bombay Road	NY 37 in Westville	
CR 5	10.97	17.65	NY 458 in Waverly	Moira–St. Regis Falls Road	US 11 / NY 95 in Moira	Was part of NY 95 during the 1930s
CR 6	3.41	5.49	St. Lawrence County line (becomes CR 52)	North Lawrence–Moira Road in Moira	NY 95	
CR 7	3.89	6.26	NY 11B in Dickinson	Gale Road	US 11 in Brushton	
CR 8	10.31	16.59	Brushton village line at Moira	Fay–Brushton Road	NY 37 in Malone	
CR 9	1.24	2.00	St. Lawrence County line (becomes CR 37)	Helena Road in Bombay	NY 95	
CR 10	2.98	4.80	CR 12 in Brandon	Crooks Road	NY 11B in Bangor	
CR 11	2.30	3.70	US 11 / CR 53	Depot Road in Bangor	CR 8	Former number; see CR 22
CR 12	3.63	5.84	CR 15	Skerry Road in Brandon	CR 13	
CR 13	3.21	5.17	CR 12 in Brandon	Bangor–Skelly Road	NY 11B / CR 53 in Bangor	
CR 14	14.85	23.90	CR 5 in Waverly	Red Tavern Road	NY 30 / CR 26 in Duane	
CR 15	2.71	4.36	CR 12 in Brandon	Eddy Road	NY 11B in Bangor	
CR 16	2.90	4.67	NY 11B	Bacon Road in Bangor	US 11	
CR 17	4.95	7.97	US 11 in Moira	Sayles Road	CR 32 in Bombay	
CR 18	8.16	13.13	NY 30 in Santa Clara	Forest Home Road	Ampersand Avenue in Harrietstown	
CR 19	5.03	8.10	CR 8 in Bangor	Jewett Road	NY 37 / NY 122 in Westville	
CR 20	5.93	9.54	NY 37 in Westville	Trout River–Westville Road	NY 30 in Constable	
CR 21	0.23	0.37	CR 19	Old State Highway in Westville	NY 37	
CR 22	10.26	16.51	NY 37 in Westville	Unnamed road	US 11 in Burke	Transferred to state in 1980; now NY 122
CR 22	2.30	3.70	US 11 / CR 53	Depot Road in Bangor	CR 8	Formerly CR 11
CR 23	8.88	14.29	US 11 in Malone	Malone–Chateaugay Road	US 11 in Chateaugay	
CR 24	11.39	18.33	US 11 in Malone	Brainardsville Road	NY 190 / NY 374 in Bellmont	
CR 25	7.46	12.01	CR 41 at Studley Hill Road	Duane Road in Malone	Malone village line	
CR 26	19.14	30.80	NY 30 in Duane	Port Kent–Hopkinton Turnpike	NY 3 in Franklin	Designated as NY 99 from 1930 to 1994
CR 27	12.35	19.88	CR 26 in Duane	Pond Road	CR 25 in Malone	
CR 28	2.90	4.67	NY 30 in Constable	Town Line Road	US 11 in Malone	
CR 29	5.00	8.05	US 11	Jamison Line Road in Burke	Dead end at the Canadian border	Used to cross into the Canadian Border until 2011 when the border crossing was closed
CR 30	11.69	18.81	NY 86 in Brighton	Gabriels–Onchiota Road	NY 3 in Franklin	Former number; see CR 60

== Routes 31 and up ==
Route	Length (mi)	Length (km)	From	Via	To	Notes
CR 31	3.14	5.05	NY 86	Jones Pond Road in Brighton	CR 60	
CR 32	5.74	9.24	NY 95 in Bombay	South Bombay Road	CR 3 in Bangor	
CR 33	5.74	9.24	CR 24 in Bellmont	Willis Road	CR 23 in Chateaugay	
CR 34	1.28	2.06	CR 23 / CR 36 in Burke village	Mill Street and Burke Center Road	US 11 in Burke	
CR 35	6.43	10.35	US 11	Chasm Road in Chateaugay	NY 374 / CR 52	
CR 36	4.03	6.49	CR 33 in Bellmont	Flynn Road and Depot Street	CR 23 / CR 34 in Burke village	
CR 37	1.74	2.80	NY 374 / CR 24	Brainardsville Road in Bellmont	Clinton County line (became CR 4)	Transferred to state in 1980; now part of NY 190
CR 38	4.02	6.47	NY 30 in Constable	Irish Street	US 11 in Burke	
CR 39	3.65	5.87	US 11	Earlville Road in Chateaugay	Farquher Road	
CR 40	4.79	7.71	CR 20 in Westville	Sulphur Springs Road	CR 20 / CR 56 in Constable	
CR 41	3.76	6.05	NY 30	Fayetteville Road in Malone	CR 25 at Studley Hill Road	
CR 42	3.31	5.33	CR 4	Merrick Road and Salmon Street in Fort Covington	NY 37	
CR 43	4.71	7.58	NY 37	Drum Street Road in Fort Covington	Little Salmon River bridge	
CR 44	1.50	2.41	NY 30	Stetson Road and Hosley Avenue in Tupper Lake	NY 3 / NY 30	
CR 45	2.40	3.86	NY 3	Wawbeek Road in Harrietstown	NY 30	
CR 46	0.97	1.56	NY 30	Back Bay and Saranac Inn Roads in Santa Clara	NY 30	
CR 47	1.10	1.77	Saranac Lake village line	Old Colby Lake Road in Harrietstown	NY 86	
CR 48	3.66	5.89	Essex County line (becomes CR 18)	Franklin Falls Road in Franklin	Essex County line (becomes CR 72)	
CR 49	0.73	1.17	Tupper Lake village line	McLaughlin Avenue in Tupper Lake	Tupper Lake village line	
CR 50	3.63	5.84	CR 18	McMaster Road in Harrietstown	NY 186	
CR 51	1.74	2.80	US 11	Creighton Road in Malone	NY 37	
CR 52	4.65	7.48	US 11 / NY 374 in Chateaugay village	River Street and River Road	Canadian border at Chateaugay	Formerly part of NY 374; transferred to county in 1980, but the routes overlapped until 2017
CR 53	2.06	3.32	NY 11B / CR 13	Bangor–North Bangor Road in Bangor	US 11 / CR 22	Formerly part of NY 122; transferred to county in 1980
CR 54	1.40	2.25	NY 374	Forge Road in Bellmont	Clinton County line (becomes CR 5)	Formerly part of NY 190; transferred to county in 1980
CR 55	3.57	5.75	NY 86 in Brighton	Bloomingdale Road	Essex County line at Franklin (becomes CR 81)	Formerly part of NY 192; transferred to county in 1980
CR 56	1.47	2.37	NY 30	New Road in Constable	CR 20 / CR 40	
CR 60	11.69	18.81	NY 86 in Brighton	Gabriels–Onchiota Road	NY 3 in Franklin	Formerly CR 30
CR 61	0.36	0.58	NY 30 in Malone	6th Street	Park Street in Village of Malone	

== See also ==
- County routes in New York
