= List of New York State Historic Markers in Franklin County, New York =

This is an incomplete list of New York State Historic Markers in Franklin County, New York.

== Listings county-wide ==
	First Line	Image	Date designated	Location	City or Town	Coords	Marker text
1	BANGOR'S FIRST SETTLER			On Us 11 At North Bangor	Bangor, New York		Joseph Plumb, Revolutionary Soldier, Came From Brattleboro, Vt. To This Farm, With Oxen Yoked On A Sled
2	OLD MILITARY			On NYS 11B at Bangor	Bangor, New York		Turnpike Plattsburgh to Hopkinton via Ellenburg, Chateaugay Malone. Begun by Military Labor 1817. Completed in 1826.
3	ON THIS SITE			On NYS 374 about 1 Mile S. of Brainardsville	Bellmont, New York		Was Built in 1874 the World's Largest Catalan Forge Abandoned in 1893
4	"LOST DAUPHIN" COTTAGE			On NYS 37 At Hogansburh	Bombay, New York		In this Dwelling Lived Eleazer Williams who Claimed to be Son of Louis XVI of France
5	GRAVE OF			On Town Road at Hogansburg	Bombay, New York		Eleazer Williams Episcopal Clergyman Missionary to Indians Reputed The "Lost Dauphin", Son of Louis XVI
6	HOME OF			On Nys 37 At Hogansburh	Bombay, New York		William Hogan Founder of Hogansburg Member of United States Congress, 1831–33
7	ON THIS SITE			On Town Road at Hogansburg	Bombay, New York		Was Erected Franklin County's First Catholic Church, 1834
8	NORTHWEST			On NYS 192 at Gabriels	Brighton, Franklin County, New York		Bay Road Begun Prior to 1810. From Westport via Elizabethtown, Lake Placid, Saranac Lake, Santa Clara, Hopkinton
9	SITE OF			At Thayers Corners on US 11 3 Miles W. of Chateaugay	Burke (town), New York		First Store in Burke Erected and Operated by Daniel Mitchell at Thayers Corners Destroyed by Tornado, 1856
10	FORT HICKORY			On Town Road about 1 Mile S. of Earlville	Chateaugay, New York		Site of Blockhouse Occupied During War of 1812 By Samuel Hollenbeck, Who Once Defended it Single Handed Against Attack
11	OLD MILITARY			On NYS 11B At E. Dickinson	Dickinson, Franklin County, New York		Turnpike Plattsburgh to Hopkinton via Ellenburg, Chateaugay Malone. Begun by Military Labor 1817. Completed in 1826.
12	NORTHWEST			On NYS 72 About 3 Miles N. of McColloms	Duane, New York		Bay Road Begun Prior to 1810. From Westport via Elizabethtown, Lake Placid, Saranac Lake, Santa Clara, Hopkinton
13	FIRST BAPIST			On Salmon St. at Fort Covington	Fort Covington, New York		Church Organized 1821. Third Church Built in Franklin Co. Now Used as a Masonic Temple
14	ON THIS SITE			On Covington Lane at Fort Covington	Fort Covington, New York		Was Built in 1812 a blockhouse. Used to Shelter Sick and Wounded after the Retreat from Chrysler's Field in 1813
15	PRESBYTERIAN			On Covington St. at Fort Covington.	Fort Covington, New York		Church Organized about 1821. Original Building Erected 1828. Rebuilt and enlarged in 1866.
16	SITE OF			On Main St. At Fort Covington	Fort Covington, New York		Fort Covington Winter Quarters of Gen. Wilkinson's Army after defeat at Chrysler's Field, War of 1812
17	THIS BUILDING			On Main St. At Fort Covington	Fort Covington, New York		Was Headquarters of General Jacob Brown American Army Officer During the winter of 1813-14 in the War of 1812
18	NORTHWEST			On NYS 86 at the north end of Village of Saranac Lake	Harrietstown, New York		Bay Road Begun Prior to 1810. From Westport via Elizabethtown, Lake Placid, Saranac Lake, Santa Clara, Hopkinton
19	ARSENAL GREEN			On East Main St. at Malone	Malone (village), New York		Deeded to State 1812 for a Public Parade Ground. Used on Training Days. Stone Arsenal Built in 1812, remained until about 1855
20	CONGREGATIONAL			On East Main St. At Malone	Malone (village), New York		Church Organized 1807. First Church Building in County 1826; Second 1856; Present 1883. First Pastor, Ashbel Parmelee
21	FRANKLIN ACADEMY			On Webster St. At Malone	Malone (village), New York		First School Taught 1806; Called Harison Academy 1811. Chartered 1831 as Franklin Academy. 73 Men Mortgaged their farms to Supply Funds.
22	HARISON HOUSE			On Webster St. At Malone	Malone (village), New York		Home of Richard Harison 1747–1829. Member of NY Convention to ratify the US Constitution 1788, US Attorney, NYC Recorder. General Wilkinson's Headquarters in War of 1812.
23	HOME OF			On Elm St. At Malone	Malone (village), New York		William Almon Wheeler 1819-87; Attorney, Banker, Assemblyman, State Senator, Congressman, Vice President of United States 1877-81.
24	OLD MILITARY			On NYS 11B At Malone	Malone (village), New York		Turnpike Plattsburgh to Hopkinton via Ellenburg, Chateaugay Malone. Begun by Military Labor 1817. Completed In 1826.
25	SITE OF			On West Main St. At Malone	Malone (village), New York		Foote Tavern 1807-13; U.s. Hospital 1813-14 Original House Moved To Franklin Street 1892 And Site Used For Armory
26	FIRST SCHOOL			On Us 11 At Moira	Moira, Town Of, New York		Building in Town Of Moira stood on this site Built of Logs about 1807
27	SITE OF FIRST			On Us 11 at the Western Edge Of Brushton	Moira, New York		Starch Factory in Town of Moira. Built in 1851 by Col. C.A. Stone and Capt. Wm. A. Tupper
28	SITE OF HOME			On NYS 95 about 2½ Mis. N. of Moira	Moira, New York		Luther Bradish Lt. Gov. New York 1838-40 Speaker of Assembly in 1838 Special United States Envoy to Constantinople, 1820
29	UNION CHURCH			On County Rd. at Moira	Moira, New York	44°49′04.63″N 74°33′22.45″W	Erected Here about 1833 by Christian and M.E. Denominations First Church in County, Present Church Built in 1867
30	JENNINGS ROAD			On NYS 72 about 6 Miles SE of Santa Clara	Santa Clara, New York		Used by U.S. Troops War of 1812 Marching West from Lake Champlain to Lake Ontario
31	NORTHWEST			On Nys 72 At Santa Clara	Santa Clara, New York		Bay Road Begun Prior to 1810. From Westport via Elizabethtown, Lake Placid, Saranac Lake, Santa Clara, Hopkinton
32	OLDEST BUILDING			On Nys 72 at Santa Clara	Santa Clara, New York		Town of Santa Clara Former Railroad Station Built by John Hurd who built Railroad in 1889
33	TURNPIKE			On County Rd. About 1 Mi. N. Of St. Regis Falls	Waverly, Franklin County, New York		Port Kent to Hopkinton Built 1829-32, via Ausable Forks, Black Brook, Franklin Falls, Loon Lake St. Regis Falls, Hopkinton
34	MAN HOMESTEAD			On Co. Rd. 2 Mis. W. Of Constable	Westville, New York		Occupied by Dr. Albon and Alric Man, Brothers from Vermont 1802. House Built Prior to 1810. Both Officers in the War of 1812
35	SITE OF			On Nys 37 At Westville	Westville, New York		First Church in Westville. Westville Free Church Erected in 1837

== See also ==
- List of New York State Historic Markers
- National Register of Historic Places listings in New York
- List of National Historic Landmarks in New York
