= List of churches and parishes in the Diocese of Ogdensburg =

The Roman Catholic Diocese of Ogdensburg covers the North Country and St. Lawrence Valley of northern New York. There are over 100 parishes in the eight-county area, which spans St. Lawrence, Jefferson, Lewis, Franklin, Clinton, Essex, and northern Herkimer and Hamilton Counties.

== Adirondack Deanery ==
- St. Alphonsus-Holy Name Parish (Tupper Lake) – Established in 1890 and 1904, respectively
- St. Agnes (Lake Placid) – Established in 1896
  - Mission: St. Brendan's (Keene)
- St. Bernard's (Saranac Lake) – Established in 1894
  - Mission: Church of the Assumption (Gabriels) – Established in 1912
  - Oratories:
    - St. Paul's Oratory (Bloomingdale)
    - St. John's in the Wilderness (Lake Clear) – Established in 1917

== Clinton Deanery ==
All parishes are located in the City of Plattsburgh unless otherwise noted

- Catholic Community of Holy Name and St. Matthew (Au Sable Forks and Wilmington)
- Church of the Assumption (Redford)
- Church of the Holy Angels (Altona)
  - Mission: St. Louis of France (Sciota)
- Our Lady of Victory Church] (4915 S. Catherine St.) – Established in 1907
- Roman Catholic Community of Keeseville – Formed from merger of St. John the Baptist Church and the Church of the Immaculate Conception
- Sacred Heart Church (Chazy)
- St. Alexander's (Morrisonville)
- St. Ann's−St. Joseph's (Mooers) – Established in 1992 from merger of both churches; founded in 1860 and 1911, respectively
- St. Augustine's (Peru) – Established in 1883
  - Mission: St. Patrick's (West Peru)
- St. Bernard's (Lyon Mountain)
- Church of St. Dismas, the Good Thief (Dannemora) – Located in the Clinton Correctional Facility
- St. Edmund's Church (Ellenburg)
- St. James Church (Cadyville)
- St. John the Baptist Roman Catholic Church (18-20 Broad St.)
  - St. John XXIII Newman Center (90 Broad St.) – Newman Center of SUNY Plattsburgh
  - Oratory: St. Mary's of the Lake (Cumberland Head) – Masses are no longer celebrated here as of July 2011
- St. Joseph's Church (Dannemora)
- St. Joseph's Church (West Chazy)
- St. Mary's Church (Champlain)
- St. Patrick's Church (Rouses Point)
  - Oratory: St. Joseph's (Coopersville) - Mother Church of several parishes in the deanery.
- St. Peter's Church (114 Cornelia St.)

== Essex Deanery ==
- Adirondack Champlain Community Parishes:
  - St. Elizabeth (Elizabethtown)
  - St. Philip of Jesus (Willsboro)
  - St. Philip Neri/St. Joseph (Westport/Essex)
- Catholic Community of Moriah:
  - Church of the Sacred Heart of Jesus (Crown Point)
  - Church of All Saints (Mineville)
  - St. Patrick's (Port Henry)
- Our Lady of Lourdes (Schroon Lake)
- St. Joseph's (Olmstedville)
- St. Mary's (Ticonderoga) – Established in 1844

== Franklin Deanery ==
- St. Andre Bessette Parish (Malone) – Established in 2014 from the merger of the following parishes:
  - Notre Dame – Established in 1869
  - St. Helen's (Chasm Falls) – Established in 1877
  - St. John Bosco – Established in 1935
  - St. Joseph's – Established in 1848
- St. Ann's (St. Regis Falls)
- Catholic Community of Burke and Chateaugay:
  - St. George Church (Burke)
  - St. Patrick's (Chateaugay)
- Catholic Community of Constable, Westville and Trout River:
  - St. Francis of Assisi (Constable)
  - Our Lady of Fatima (Westville)
- The Catholic Community of St. Augustine's:
  - St. Augustine's (North Bangor)
  - St. Mary's (Brushton)
- St. Mary's of the Fort (Fort Covington)
  - St. Joseph's Church (Bombay)

== Hamilton/Herkimer Deanery ==
- St. Ann's (Wells)
- St. Anthony of Padua Parish (Inlet) – Established in 1915
  - Mission: St. William's Chapel (Raquette Lake) – Established in 1890; consolidated into the above parish in 2004
- St. Bartholomew's (Old Forge) – Established in 1897; place of worship rebuilt in 1991
- St. Henry's (Long Lake)
  - Mission: St. Therese (Newcomb)
- St. James Major (Lake Pleasant)
- St. Mary's (Indian Lake)
  - Mission: St. Paul's (Blue Mountain Lake)

== Jefferson Deanery ==
All parishes are located in the City of Watertown unless otherwise noted

- Church of the Holy Family (129 Winthrop St.)
- Immaculate Conception Church (Brownville/Dexter)
- Our Lady of the Sacred Heart Church (320 W. Lynde St) – Established in 1838; originally a mission of St. James' Church in Carthage until 1857
- The Roman Catholic Community of Cape Vincent, Rosiere, and Chaumont:
  - St. Vincent of Paul (Cape Vincent)
  - St. Vincent de Paul (Rosiere)
  - All Saints Church (Chaumont)
- St. Andrew's (Sackets Harbor)
- St. Anthony Parish (850 Arsenal St.)
  - Yoked with St. Patrick Parish (123 S. Massey St.)
- St. Cecilia's (Adams)
  - Mission: Queen of Heaven Church (Henderson)
- St. Cyril (Alexandria Bay)
  - Mission: St. Francis Xavier (Redwood)
- St. James Minor (Carthage) – Established in 1821
- St. Mary's (Clayton) – Established in 1844
  - Mission: St. John the Baptist (La Fargeville)
- St. Mary's (Evans Mills)
  - Yoked with St. Joseph's of Philadelphia and St. Teresa's Church of Theresa
- St. Paul's (Black River)
  - Yoked with St. Rita's of Deferiet

== Lewis Deanery ==
- St. Francis Solanus (Harrisville)
- St. Hedwig's (Houseville)
- St. Martin's (Port Leyden)
  - Mission: St. John's Church (Lyons Falls)
- St. Mary's (Constableville)
- St. Mary's (Copenhagen) – Established in 1890; mission of St. James Minor of Carthage in the Jefferson Deanery
- St. Mary's (Glenfield)
- St. Mary's Nativity (West Leyden)
- St. Peter's (Lowville) – Established in 1865

== St. Lawrence Deanery ==
- Church of the Holy Cross (Hopkinton)
- Notre Dame (Ogdensburg)
- Parish of the Visitation and St. Raymond (Norfolk/Raymondville)
  - Mission: St. Andrew's (Norwood)
- Roman Catholic Community of Morristown, Hammond and Rossie
  - St. John the Evangelist (Morristown)
  - St. Patrick's (Rossie)
  - St. Peter's (Hammond)
- Sacred Heart Church (Edwards) – Established in 1928
- St. Hubert's (Star Lake)
  - Mission: St. Michael's – Established in 1986; formerly a separate parish
- St. James (Gouverneur)
- St. John the Baptist (Madrid)
- St. Lawrence's (North Lawrence)
- St. Mary's Cathedral (Ogdensburg) – Established in 1827; mother church of the diocese
- The Roman Catholic Church of St. Mary (Potsdam) – Established in 1898
  - Mission: St. Patrick's (Colton) – Established in 1979
- St. Mary's (Canton)
- St. Mary's (Waddington)
- St. Patrick's (Brasher Falls)
- St. Peter's Parish (Massena/Louisville)
  - Sacred Heart/St. Lawrence
  - St. Mary's
- St. Raphael's (Heuvelton)
  - Yoked with Sts. Philip and James (Lisbon)
- Oratory:
  - St. Joseph's Oratory (Massena)
