= Franklin Academy (New York) =

Coordinates: 44°50′27.39″N 74°16′44.2″W

Location
- 42 Huskie Lane; Malone, NY 12953; United States

Information
- Type: Public
- Established: 1806
- School district: Malone Central School District
- Oversight: Franklin-Essex-Hamilton BOCES
- Principal: Angela Trombley
- Staff: 57.04 (FTE)
- Faculty: approximately 90
- Grades: 9–12
- Enrollment: 683(2025-26)
- Student to teacher ratio: 11.99
- Colors: Green and white
- Mascot: Huskie
- Website: www.maloneschools.org/o/fa

Franklin Academy (commonly called FA) is a public high school located in the rural village of Malone, New York that enrolls students from Malone and surrounding communities in northern Franklin County such as Bangor, Bellmont, Burke, Constable, Duane and Westville. With an enrollment of around 700 students in Grades 9–12, Franklin Academy is one of the larger high schools in the North Country region of Upstate New York and is accredited by the New York State Department of Education.

The school traces its history to 1806 to the Harrison Academy, a private school that was established not long after the founding of Malone.

== History ==
The first school in Malone was founded in 1806, not long after the town was established and was named Harrison Academy. The original structure was constructed from timber cut and hewed at the location of the school building, which also housed a courthouse, jails and place for worship. Originally a private institution, in 1831 it was made public and rechartered as Franklin Academy and housed in a new building made of stone. In 1868 Franklin Academy was merged with other schools located in the village of Malone.

In 1930 the school moved into a new building on Academy Street where it was housed until moving to its current location in 1968. The former location on Academy Street is currently the location of Malone Middle School. The school completed a major expansion in 2003, nearly doubling the size of the building. Many new classrooms were added as well as a new cafeteria, pool gallery, gym lobby and fitness center. In the existing building, the quadrangle was converted into a new two-story library. The main lobby was altered and a new reception and attendance office was added, significantly reducing its previous size. Most of the front steps were removed and replaced with gardens, with a small portion of steps being replaced and enclosed.

== Academics ==
Franklin Academy has 11 academic departments: Art, Athletics and Physical Education, Business, English, French and Spanish, Math, Music, Science, Social studies, Special education and Technology

Franklin Academy offers students the option to pursue a Regents Diploma, typically for college-bound students. The campus also includes the North Franklin Education Center in a separate building that provides vocational training to students in fields such as auto technology, building trades, electrical trades, health occupations, child development, cosmetology, Culinary Arts Security and Law Enforcement or heavy equipment operation. All students are required to complete a core program consisting of four years of English and social studies and at least three years of math and science. The school offers honors classes in multiple subjects, and includes a selection of Advanced Placement courses for college credit as well as opportunities to engage in college-level research and classes in partnership with local institutes of higher learning including North Country Community College, Paul Smith's College, St. Lawrence University and SUNY Plattsburgh.

== Student life ==
=== Sports ===
Franklin Academy's athletic teams are called the Huskies and wear green and white. The school's teams have won a number of Section X championships in a variety of sports. The girls basketball team had particular success in the 1990s, with one player, Missy West, being named Miss New York Basketball in 1996, and a state championship in 2008. Other successful teams include the boys and girls cross country teams, which have won multiple state championships in the late 1980s and early 1990s.

Fall sports

- Cheerleading
- Cross-country (boys and girls)
- Football
- Soccer (boys and girls)
- Swimming (girls)
- Volleyball

Winter sports

- Basketball (boys and girls)
- Ice hockey (boys and girls)
- Indoor track (boys and girls)
- Wrestling
- Bowling (boys and girls)
- Swimming (boys)

Spring sports

- Baseball
- Golf
- Softball
- Track and field

== Notable alumni and former students ==
- Tom Browning, former Major League Baseball pitcher
- Mary Jane Aldrich (1833–1909), temperance reformer and lecturer
- John I. Gilbert, 19th-century politician
- Iasos (born Joseph Bernardot)
- Eliza Kellas, Founder of Russell Sage College
- Clarence E. Kilburn, Member of the United States House of Representatives from New York between 1940 and 1965
- William S. King, 19th-century member of the United States House of Representatives representing Minnesota
- John A. Mead, 53rd governor of Vermont
- Lute Pease, editorial cartoonist
- Lucy Hobbs Taylor, first American woman to graduate from dental school
- Newton Alonzo Wells (1852–1923) American visual artist and educator
- William Almon Wheeler, 19th Vice President of the United States
