= Bangor, New York =

- Town
- Location within the state of New York Bangor (the United States)
- Coordinates: 44°50′42″N 74°26′45″W
- Country: United States
- State: New York
- County: Franklin

Government
  - Type: Town Council
  - Town Supervisor: Gary Monica (D)
  - Town Council: Members' List: • Tim Tallman (R); • Gerald Perry (D); • Barry White (D); • Gary Monica (D)

Area
  - Total: 43.12 sq mi (111.68 km^{2})
  - Land: 43.12 sq mi (111.68 km^{2})
  - Water: 0 sq mi (0.00 km^{2})
- Elevation: 571 ft (174 m)

Population (2020)
  - Total: 2,231
  - Density: 51.7/sq mi (19.98/km^{2})
- Time zone: UTC-5 (Eastern (EST))
  - Summer (DST): UTC-4 (EDT)
- ZIP Codes: 12966 (Bangor); 12916 (Brushton); 12953 (Malone); 12930 (Dickinson Center)
- Area code: 518
- FIPS code: 3603304319
- GNIS feature ID: 0978708

Bangor is a town in Franklin County, New York, United States. The population was 2,231 at the 2020 census. The town is named after Bangor in Wales.

It is an interior town of the county, located west of Malone.

== History ==
Settlement commenced around 1806. The town of Bangor was organized from the town of Dickinson in 1812. The town lost some territory upon the later foundation of the town of Brandon in 1828.

== Geography ==
The town of Bangor is in northwestern Franklin County, bordered by Fort Covington and Westville to the north, Malone to the east, Brandon to the south, Dickinson at Bangor's southwestern corner, Moira to the west, and Bombay at Bangor's northwestern corner.

According to the United States Census Bureau, Bangor has a total area of 43.1 square miles (111.7 km^{2}), all land. The town is drained by the Little Salmon River and its tributaries, all part of the Saint Lawrence River watershed.

U.S. Route 11 and New York State Route 11B are important east-west highways across the town.

== Demographics ==
Historical population
Census	Pop.	Note	%±
1820	370		—
1830	1,076		190.8%
1840	1,289		19.8%
1850	2,159		67.5%
1860	2,520		16.7%
1870	2,431		−3.5%
1880	2,440		0.4%
1890	2,445		0.2%
1900	2,221		−9.2%
1910	1,946		−12.4%
1920	1,927		−1.0%
1930	1,701		−11.7%
1940	1,734		1.9%
1950	1,738		0.2%
1960	1,896		9.1%
1970	1,909		0.7%
1980	1,960		2.7%
1990	2,080		6.1%
2000	2,147		3.2%
2010	2,224		3.6%
2020	2,231		0.3%
U.S. Decennial Census

As of the census of 2000, there were 2,147 people, 776 households, and 585 families residing in the town. The population density was 49.8 inhabitants per square mile (19.2/km^{2}). There were 841 housing units at an average density of 19.5 per square mile (7.5/km^{2}). The racial makeup of the town was 98.00% White, 0.37% Native American, 0.14% Asian, 0.37% from other races, and 1.12% from two or more races. Hispanic or Latino of any race were 1.12% of the population.

There were 776 households, out of which 36.6% had children under the age of 18 living with them, 61.3% were married couples living together, 8.2% had a female householder with no husband present, and 24.6% were non-families. 20.7% of all households were made up of individuals, and 10.1% had someone living alone who was 65 years of age or older. The average household size was 2.76 and the average family size was 3.12.

In the town, the population was spread out, with 28.1% under the age of 18, 8.0% from 18 to 24, 28.9% from 25 to 44, 21.8% from 45 to 64, and 13.2% who were 65 years of age or older. The median age was 36 years. For every 100 females, there were 98.8 males. For every 100 females age 18 and over, there were 97.7 males.

The median income for a household in the town was $31,033, and the median income for a family was $35,708. Males had a median income of $26,802 versus $21,597 for females. The per capita income for the town was $13,679. About 14.1% of families and 18.2% of the population were below the poverty line, including 27.7% of those under age 18 and 12.4% of those age 65 or over.

== Notable people ==
- Robert N. Chamberlain (July 24, 1856 – September 20, 1917), lawyer who served as the Speaker of the New Hampshire House of Representatives and as the Chief Justice of the New Hampshire Superior Court
- Sile Doty (August 30, 1800 – March 12, 1876), infamous robber, burglar, horse thief, highwayman, counterfeiter, and criminal gang leader
- Harding Lemay (March 16, 1922 – May 26, 2018), also known as Pete Lemay, was an American screenwriter and playwright best known for his stint as head writer of the soap opera Another World

== Communities and locations in Bangor ==
- Baconville – A former community in the southwestern part of the town.
- Bangor – The hamlet of Bangor is in the southern section of the town at the junction of NY-11B and County Road 13.
- Bangor Station – A location northwest of North Bangor, located on County Road 11.
- Cooks Corners – A hamlet near the northern town line at the junction of County Roads 3 and 32.
- North Bangor – North Bangor was incorporated as a village in 1914, but later abandoned that status. It is located on US-11 at County Road 53.
- West Bangor – A hamlet west of Bangor village on NY-11B at Count Road 10. It was formerly called "Pottersville".
