= New York State Route 122 =

State highway in Franklin County, New York, US

New York State Route 122
- NY 122 highlighted in red

Route information
- Maintained by NYSDOT
- Length: 10.26 mi (16.51 km)
- Existed: c. 1938–present

Major junctions
- West end: NY 37 in Westville
- East end: US 11 in Burke

Location
- Country: United States
- State: New York
- Counties: Franklin

Highway system
- New York Highways; Interstate; US; State; Reference; Parkways
← NY 121	→ NY 123

New York State Route 122 (NY 122) is a 10.26-mile-long (16.51 km) east–west state highway in northern Franklin County, New York, United States. The western terminus of the route is at an intersection with NY 37 in the town of Westville. Its eastern terminus is at a junction with U.S. Route 11 (US 11) in the town of Burke. Near its midpoint, NY 122 has a short overlap with NY 30 in the town of Constable. NY 122 serves as a northerly bypass of the village of Malone, situated 6 miles (10 km) to the south.

NY 122 was assigned c. 1938 as a north–south connector between what is now NY 11B and US 11 in the nearby town of Bangor. It was extended northeast to Burke via Westville after the state acquired ownership of the Westville–Burke highway in 1980, and truncated to begin in Westville approximately 10 years later. Modern NY 122 follows what was originally designated New York State Route 188 during the 1930s.

== Route description ==
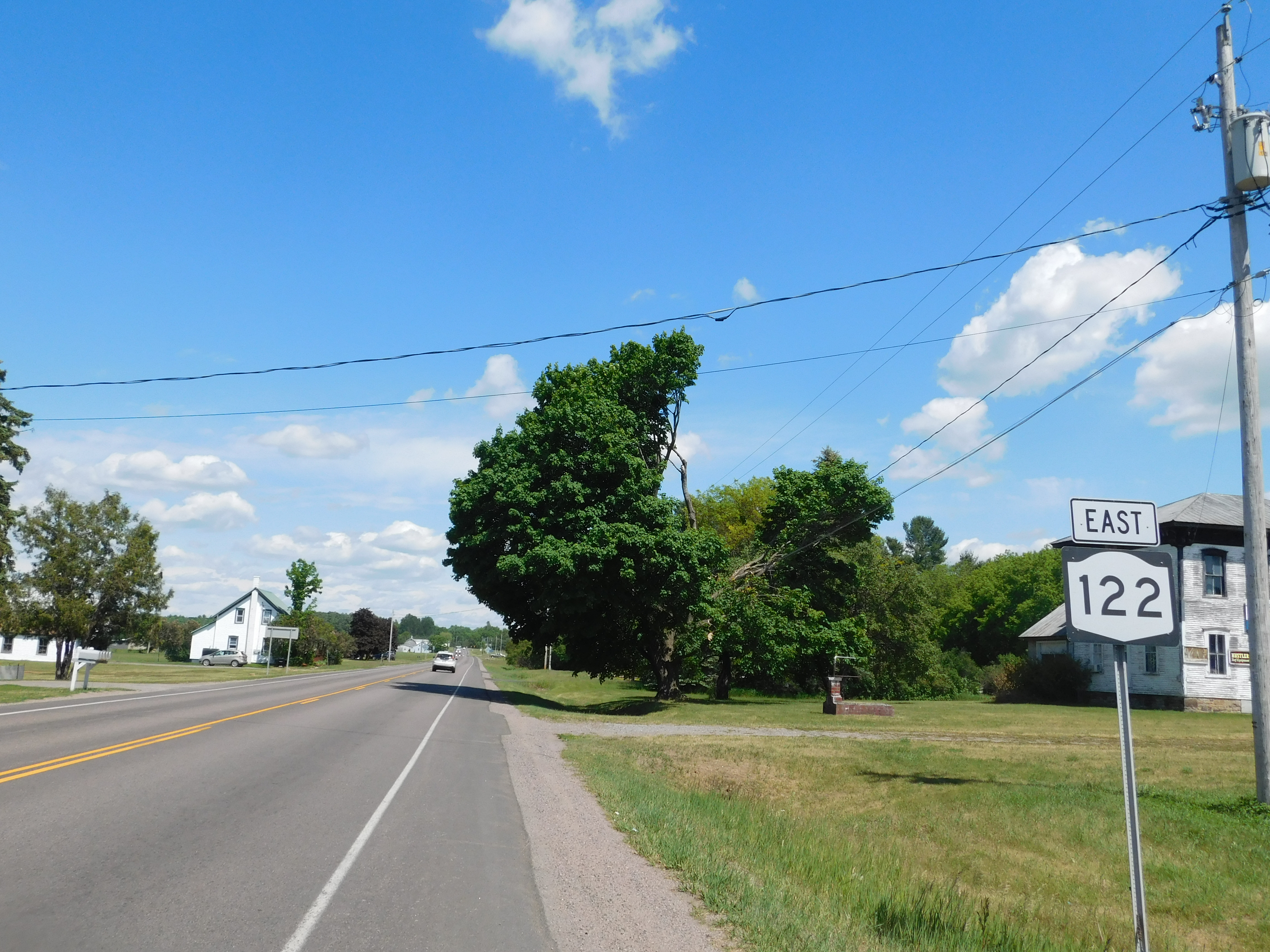
NY 122 eastbound in Westville Center

NY 122 begins at an intersection with NY 37 in the Westville hamlet of Westville Center as an eastward continuation of County Route 19 (CR 19, Jewett Road). The route initially heads eastward from NY 37 as a rural, two-lane road before ducking to the southeast. After an intersection with Bird Road roughly 0.75 miles (1.21 km) from Westville Center, it continues on a southeasterly track for 2 miles (3.2 km), running alongside the Salmon River before curving eastward into the town of Constable. NY 122 soon enters the hamlet of the same name, where the undeveloped surroundings give way to a stretch of residences on both sides of the highway.

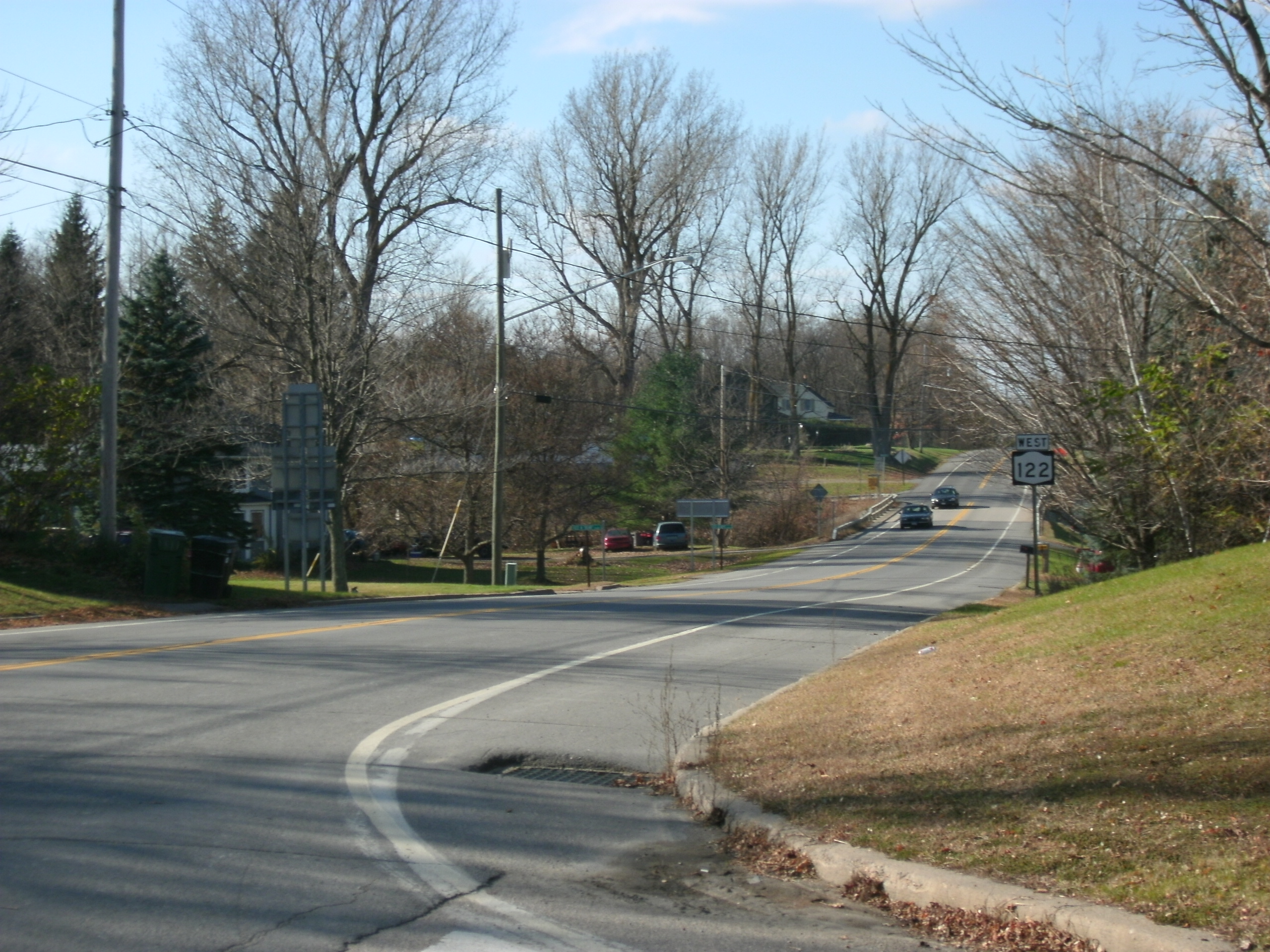
Looking west along NY 122 from NY 30 southbound in Constable

In the center of Constable, NY 122 intersects NY 30, which overlaps with NY 122 for one block on its way from Malone to the Canadian border. The highway continues east from NY 30, serving residences in the eastern part of the hamlet before curving to the southeast and entering another rural area. The road crosses into the town of Burke at a junction with Constable–Burke Town Line Road 3 miles (4.8 km) east of Constable, and subsequently takes on a more pronounced southeasterly alignment. NY 122 ends 1.5 miles (2.4 km) later at an intersection with US 11 just west of the hamlet of Burke Center.

== History ==
In the 1930 renumbering of state highways in New York, a north–south highway in the town of Bangor that linked the hamlets of Bangor and North Bangor was designated as part of NY 187, an east–west route connecting Nicholville to North Bangor via Bangor. Farther north, an east–west roadway between NY 10 (now NY 30) in Constable and US 11 in Burke was assigned the NY 188 designation. NY 187 was realigned c. 1937 to continue east from Bangor to Malone via modern NY 11B. Its former routing between Bangor and North Bangor was designated as NY 122 by the following year. Meanwhile, NY 188 was extended west to NY 37 in Westville c. 1932 before it was removed c. 1939.

On April 1, 1980, ownership and maintenance of former NY 188 (by this point redesignated as CR 22) was transferred from Franklin County to the state of New York as part of a highway maintenance swap between the two levels of government. In return, the state transferred all of then-NY 122 to Franklin County. The new Westville–Burke state highway became part of NY 122, which was extended north along CR 19 to Westville Center and east along former NY 188 to Burke. NY 122 was truncated between 1985 and 1993 to consist only of the state-maintained part of the route between Westville and Burke.

== Major intersections ==
The entire route is in Franklin County.

Location	mi	km	Destinations	Notes
Westville	0.00	0.00	NY 37 – Malone, Massena	Western terminus; hamlet of Westville Center
Constable	5.36	8.63	NY 30 north – Trout River, Canada	Western terminus of NY 30 / NY 122 overlap
Constable	5.44	8.75	NY 30 south – Malone	Eastern terminus of NY 30 / NY 122 overlap
Burke	10.26	16.51	US 11 – Malone, Chateaugay	Eastern terminus; hamlet of Burke Center
1.000 mi = 1.609 km; 1.000 km = 0.621 mi: Concurrency terminus

== See also ==
- List of county routes in Franklin County, New York
