= Dickinson, New York =

Dickinson is the name of some places in the U.S. state of New York:

- Dickinson, Broome County, New York
- Dickinson, Franklin County, New York
