= Malone Central School District =

School district in New York, United States

The Malone Central School District is a school district in Malone, New York, United States. The district operates five schools: Franklin Academy, Malone Middle School, Davis Elementary, Flanders Elementary and St. Josephs Elementary.
