= Hastings Farmstead =

Historic house in New York, United States

- U.S. National Register of Historic Places
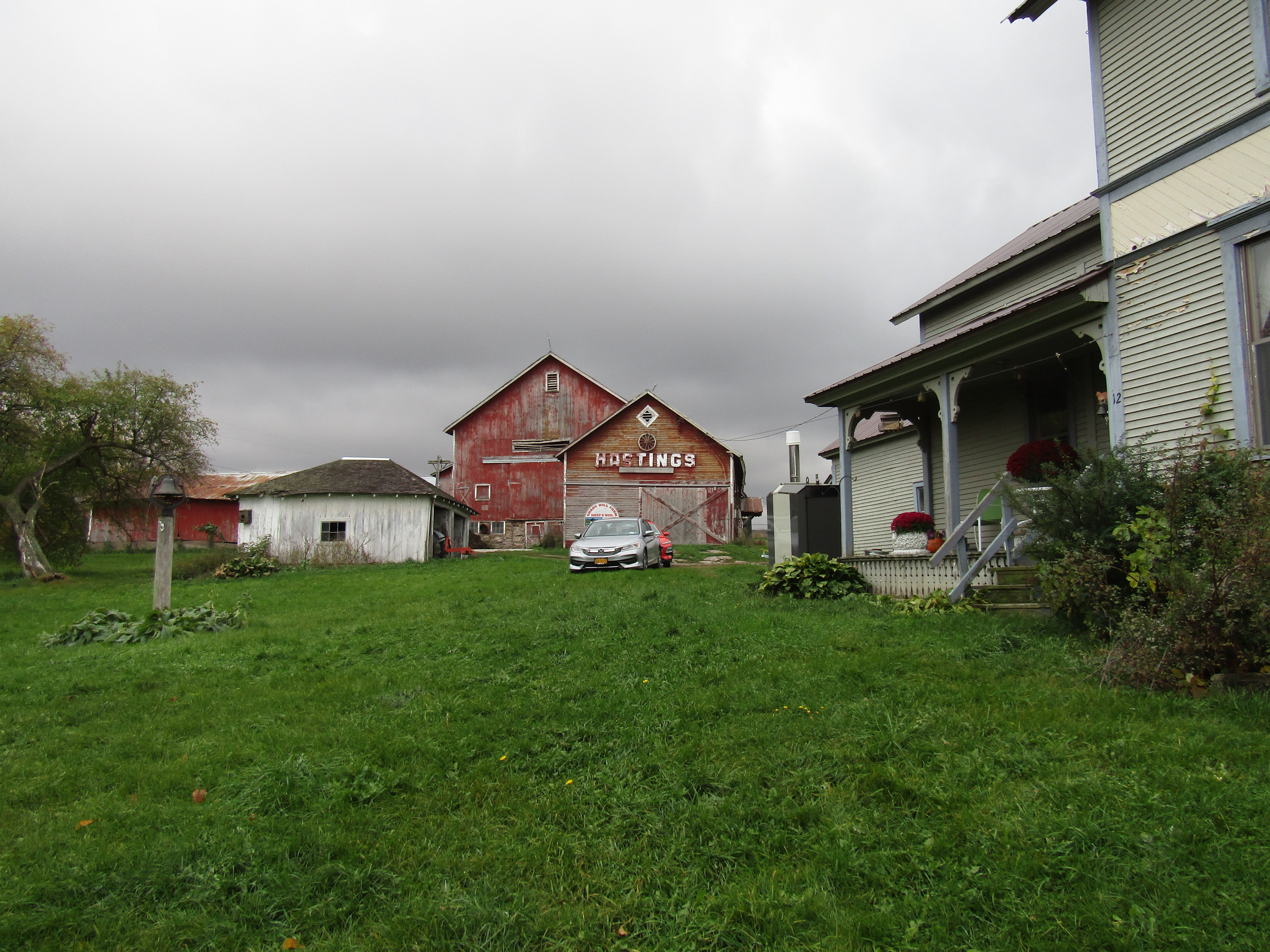

- Location within New York Location within the United States
- Nearest city: 12 Conservation Road, Dickinson Center, New York
- Coordinates: 44°43′40.728″N 74°29′12.5196″W
- Area: 137 acres (55 ha)
- Built: 1820
- Architectural style: Late 19th And Early 20th Century American Movements
- NRHP reference No.: 07000872
- Added to NRHP: August 30, 2007

Hastings Farmstead is a historic home and farm complex located at Dickinson Center in Franklin County, New York. The house was built in 1896 and is a T-shaped building with a 2 1/2-story main block, built of balloon frame construction with clapboard siding and decorative shingles in the Victorian style. Attached to the rear of the main block is a 1 1/2-story wing that was built originally in the 1820s as a summer kitchen and pantry. Also on the property are seven outbuildings built between 1820 and 1940. They include five barns, a springhouse / milk house, and garage.

It was listed on the National Register of Historic Places in 2007.
