= New York State Route 95 =

State highway in Franklin County, New York, US

New York State Route 95
- Map of northern New York with NY 95 highlighted in red

Route information
- Maintained by NYSDOT
- Length: 13.37 mi (21.52 km)
- Existed: 1930–present

Major junctions
- South end: US 11 in Moira
- North end: NY 37 in Bombay

Location
- Country: United States
- State: New York
- Counties: Franklin

Highway system
- New York Highways; Interstate; US; State; Reference; Parkways
← I-95	→ NY 96

New York State Route 95 (NY 95) is a north–south state highway located within Franklin County, New York, in the United States. It extends for 13.37 miles (21.52 km) from an intersection with U.S. Route 11 (US 11) in the town of Moira to a junction with NY 37 in the town of Bombay. The highway terminates less than 3 miles (5 km) south of the Canadian border. NY 95 initially continued south to Saint Regis Falls when it was assigned as part of the 1930 renumbering of state highways in New York. It was cut back to its current length in the mid-1930s.

Unlike most New York state routes that bear the same number of an Interstate highway, NY 95 is not an extension of, or is continuous with Interstate 95 in New York.

== Route description ==
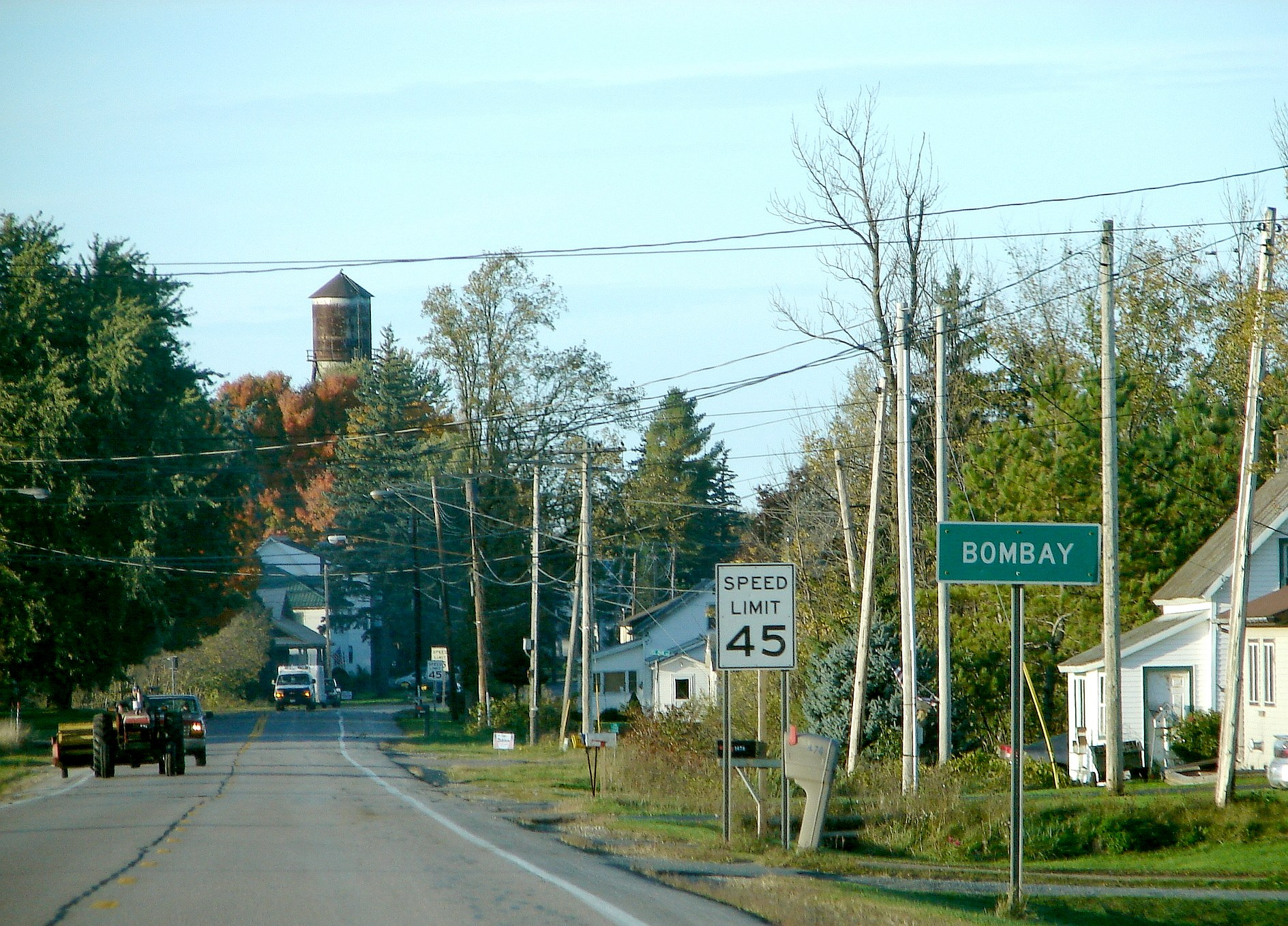
Entering the hamlet of Bombay on northbound NY 95

NY 95 begins at an intersection with US 11 and County Route 5 (CR 5, named Moira–St. Regis Falls Road) in the hamlet of Moira, located in the central part of the town of Moira. The route proceeds north through the community as a two-lane street, passing a series of homes before intersecting the eastern terminus of CR 6 (North Lawrence–Moira Road at the northern end of the hamlet. Past the junction, the residential surroundings gradually give way to open, rolling fields as the highway winds its way northward through the town of Moira. The rural terrain continues into the adjacent town of Bombay, where NY 95 begins to run along the western bank of the Little Salmon River. Across the town line, the connects to the western terminus of CR 32 ahead of a long stretch of woods surrounding the riverbank.

The route meanders north for about 2 miles (3.2 km), bending to the east and west along the river before straightening out and proceeding north to the hamlet of Bombay. NY 95 serves as the community's main north–south street, passing a park and several homes on its way to a junction with CR 4 (Bombay–Westville Road) in the center of the hamlet. Here, NY 95 turns westward while CR 1 begins to the north on NY 95's right-of-way. The route crosses CSX Transportation's Montreal Subdivision rail line before exiting the community for more rural areas of the town. It continues on a westerly track for roughly 2 miles (3.2 km) to a junction with CR 9 (Helena Road), a connector to the nearby St. Lawrence County line. From here, the route slowly curves northward away from the county line, meeting the western terminus of CR 2 before ending at an intersection with NY 37 east of the hamlet of Hogansburg. The north end of NY 95 lies just south of the St. Regis Indian Reservation and the Akwesasne Mohawk Casino.

== History ==
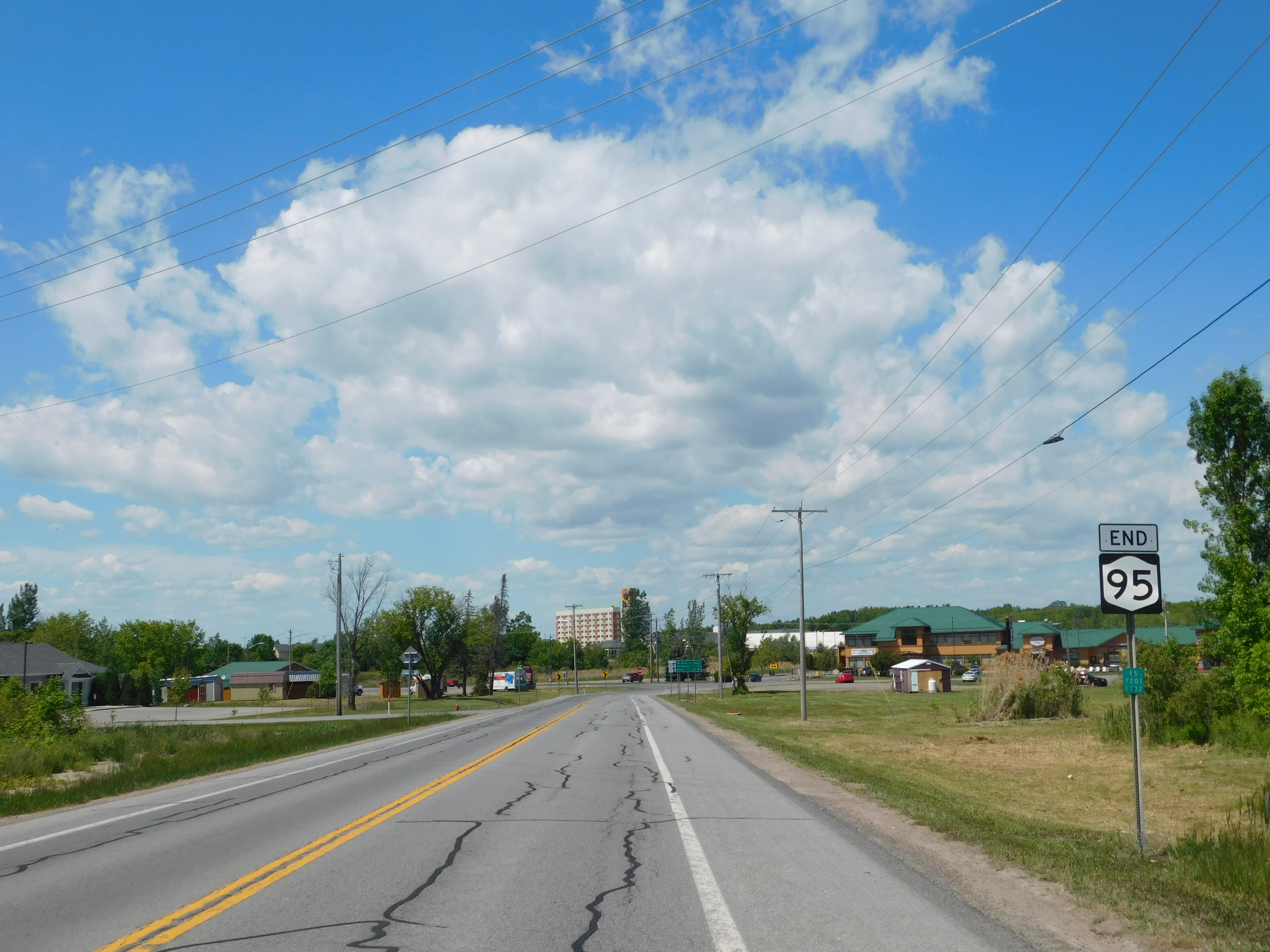
NY 95 approaching NY 37 in Bombay

The origins of NY 95 date back to the early 1910s when the highway was improved to state highway standards by the state of New York as part of two separate projects. North of Bombay, the road was rebuilt as part of a contract let on February 18, 1910, that also covered part of what is now NY 37. It was added to the state highway system on November 28, 1910, as State Highway 820 (SH 820). The section between Moira and Bombay was reconstructed under a contract awarded on March 22, 1911, and accepted as a state highway on September 16, 1913, as SH 885. Both numbers are unsigned. In the 1930 renumbering of state highways in New York, NY 95 was assigned to an alignment extending from Saint Regis Falls in the south to the vicinity of Hogansburg in the north. North of Moira, the route was overlaid on SH 885 and SH 820. NY 95 was truncated to US 11 in Moira c. 1937, and its former alignment south to Saint Regis Falls is now maintained by Franklin County as CR 5.

== Major intersections ==
The entire route is in Franklin County.

Location	mi	km	Destinations	Notes
Moira	0.00	0.00	US 11 / CR 5 (Moira–St. Regis Falls Road) – Malone, Potsdam	Southern terminus; Hamlet of Moira
Bombay	13.37	21.52	NY 37 – Bridge to Canada, Massena, Malone	Northern terminus
1.000 mi = 1.609 km; 1.000 km = 0.621 mi

== See also ==
- List of county routes in Franklin County, New York
