= Mary Jane Aldrich =

American temperance reformer and essayist (1833–1909)

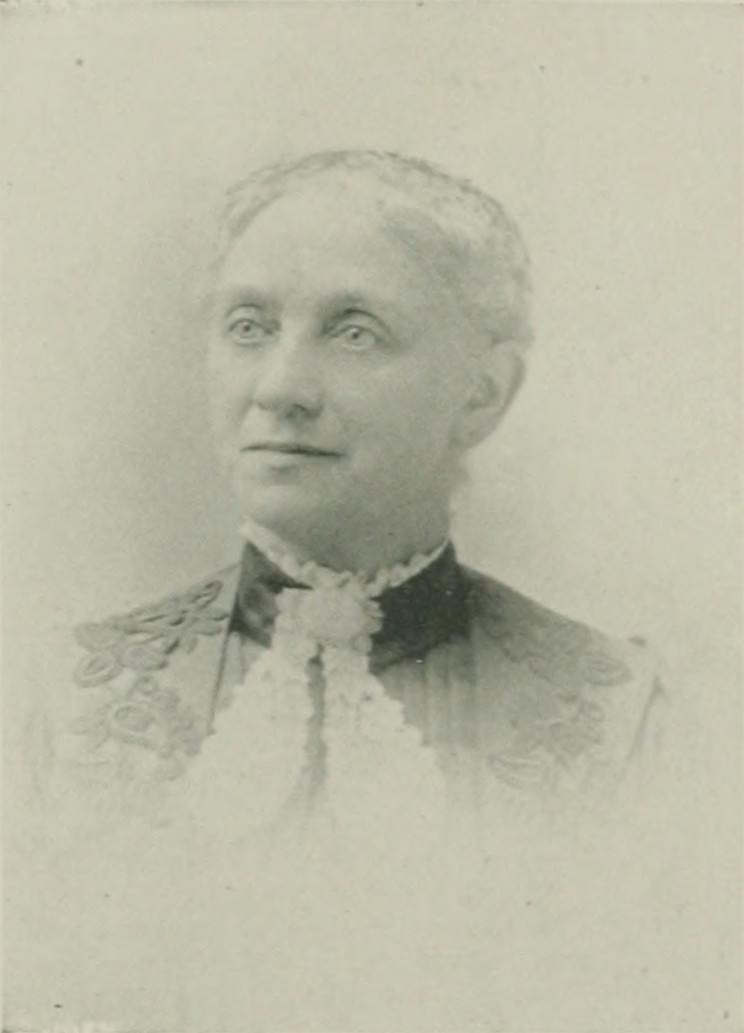
- Photo in A Woman of the Century
- Born: Mary Jane Johnston; March 19, 1833; Sidney, New York, U.S.
- Died: April 27, 1909 (aged 76); Sidney, New York, U.S.
- Education: Franklin Academy, Malone, New York
- Occupations: social reformer; lecturer; essayist
- Spouse: John Aldrich (m. 1855)
- Writing career
- Genre: essays
- Subject: temperance
- Notable works: Church and Sunday School Temperance Work (1898)

Mary Jane Aldrich (née, Johnston; March 19, 1833 – April 27, 1909) was an American temperance reformer, lecturer and essayist of the long nineteenth century. She served as vice-president of the National Woman's Christian Temperance Union (WCTU) and president of the Iowa union. At the time of the division in the ranks of the WCTU, Aldrich, with the Iowa union, adhered to the non-partisan temperance work, and became evangelistic secretary of the Non-Partisan National Woman's Christian Temperance Union. As a temperance worker, she was characterized as sanguine and practical. As a speaker, she was bright, forceful, entertaining and logical. She was the author of Church and Sunday School Temperance Work (1898).

== Early life and education ==
Mary Jane Johnston (Note: Willard & Livermore (1893) spelled Aldrich's maiden name as "Johnson". Her obituary in the Cedar Rapids, Iowa Gazette (1909) spelled it Johnston. The Lineage Book of the Daughters of the American Revolution (1932) recorded her grandfather's name as Witter Henry Johnston, and her father as Milton Johnston.) was born in Sidney Plains, New York, March 19, 1833. Her home was on a tract of land purchased before the Revolutionary War by her paternal great-grandfather, the Rev. William Johnson, a Scotch-Irish Presbyterian minister who, with her grandfather, Col. Witter Johnston, was in the Continental Army. Her father, Milton Johnston, was a farmer. Her mother, Delia Hull, was a well-educated and deeply religious woman. She had at least four siblings, three brothers and a sister.

Beyond attending a select school in early childhood, and later in the public school, she attended three terms in Franklin Academy. After turning 18, she was deeply interested in Christian and philanthropic work. At the age of 19, she joined the Congregational Church of Sidney.

== Career ==
In 1855, she married John Aldrich (1828–1909) of Norwich, New York. They then moved to the Nebraska Territory, where the first ten years of her married life were full of pioneer experiences. In 1866, she moved with her husband and two children, a son and daughter, Carl and Luta, to Cedar Rapids, Iowa, where her youngest child, a son, John, was born. Her life was spent in caring for her husband and children, as well as in Sunday school and missionary work.

From childhood, a "total abstainer" and in full sympathy with prohibitory law, she was never a temperance worker, not even a member of any temperance society, until the Women's Crusade. That movement fanned a latent interest into deep enthusiasm, brought out the hitherto undeveloped powers of her nature, and joined her to a work that she believed would serve everyone. Quick in thought and prompt in action, Aldrich soon became a recognized worker, with the consent and co-operation of her husband and children. At the organization of the WCTU of Iowa, November 3–4, 1874, the Raising of Lazarus was her text for more earnest temperance work by Christian people in restoring to a better and nobler life those who were morally "dead" through drink.

Later, at a county WCTU convention, Aldrich took the place of a college professor, who had failed to appear, and delivered her first address. Mde a vice-president of the National WCTU at its organization, November 18–20, 1874, she visited different localities to enlist women in the work of that society. Chosen corresponding secretary of the Iowa WCTU in 1875, she held the office for one year only, leaving it in order to spend more time in the field. In different positions, she was a member of the executive committee of the Iowa union, and there were few counties in Iowa where she did not speak. She was elected president of the Iowa union in 1883.

Aldrich was then elected corresponding secretary by the National WCTU. When the National Union, at the St. Louis Convention in 1884, declared in favor of political temperance work by the union, Aldrich, with the majority of the Iowa delegation, voted against the resolution. She worked alongside Judith Ellen Foster, the president, who represented the Iowa WCTU in its open opposition to political WCTU work.

In 1885, Aldrich declined re-election as president of the Iowa State union because she was unable to give to the work all the time it required.

She attended the convention held in Cleveland, Ohio, January 22–24, 1890, at which time the Non-partisan National WCTU was organized. As secretary of the department of evangelistic work, she was a member of the executive committee from its organization.

== Later life ==
The later years of Aldrich's life were spent in southern Missouri. Here, in 1905, failing health permitted only a quiet celebration of the golden wedding anniversary. In 1907, in bad health, Aldrich went with her husband and daughter to the old home in Sidney, New York, and renewed her membership in the church of her childhood. She died in Sidney, April 27, 1909, and was buried at that town's Prospect Hill Cemetery.

== Selected works ==
- Church and Sunday School Temperance Work, 1898
