= Dickinson Center, New York =

- Hamlet
- Location within New York Location within the United States
- Coordinates: 44°43′03″N 74°33′10″W
- Country: United States
- State: New York
- County: Franklin
- Elevation: 955 ft (291 m)
- Time zone: UTC-5 (Eastern (EST))
  - Summer (DST): UTC-4 (EDT)
- ZIP code: 12930
- Area codes: 518 & 838
- GNIS feature ID: 948441

Dickinson Center is a hamlet in Franklin County, New York, United States; located in Dickinson, New York. The community is 15.6 miles (25.1 km) southwest of Malone. Dickinson Center has a post office with ZIP code 12930, which opened on February 3, 1842.
