= Bombay, New York =

- Town
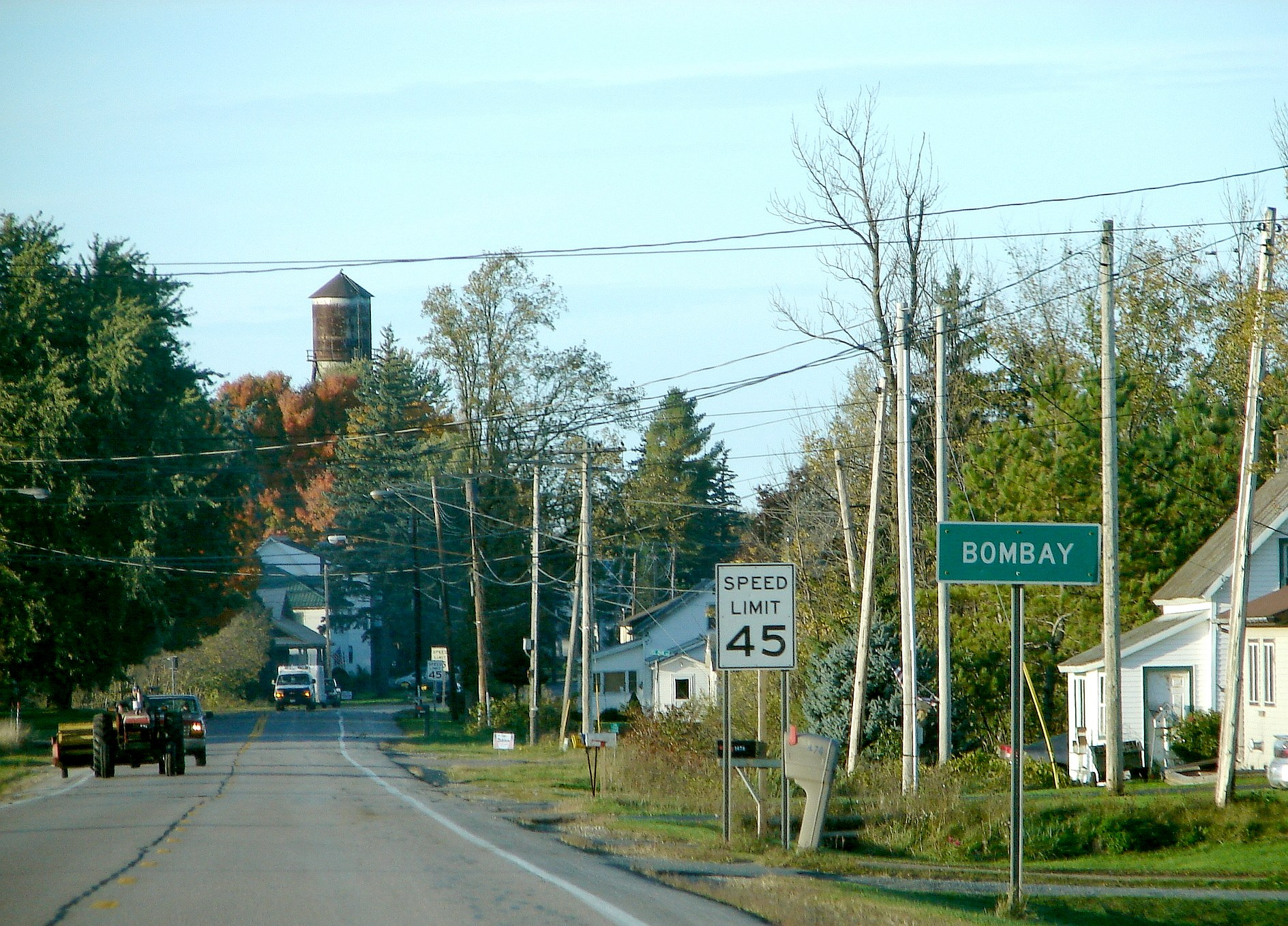

- Location within the state of New York
- Coordinates: 44°56′29″N 74°35′50″W
- Country: United States
- State: New York
- County: Franklin
- Named after: Mumbai, India

Government
  - Type: Town Council
  - Town Supervisor: Christopher Jock (D)
  - Town Council: Members' List: • Mary G. Lacerenza (D); • Christopher Jock (D); • Philip W. Reardon (D); • Michael Kelley (D)

Area
  - Total: 35.87 sq mi (92.90 km^{2})
  - Land: 35.74 sq mi (92.57 km^{2})
  - Water: 0.12 sq mi (0.32 km^{2})
- Elevation: 207 ft (63 m)

Population (2010)
  - Total: 1,357
  - Estimate (2016): 1,314
  - Density: 36.8/sq mi (14.19/km^{2})
- Time zone: UTC-5 (Eastern (EST))
  - Summer (DST): UTC-4 (EDT)
- ZIP Codes: 12914 (Bombay); 13655 (Hogansburg); 12916 (Brushton); 12957 (Moira)
- Area code: 518
- FIPS code: 36-033-07278
- GNIS feature ID: 0978742
- Website: www.bombayny.us

Bombay is a town in Franklin County, New York, United States. The population was 1,357 at the 2010 census. The town was named after a major port city in India, now known as Mumbai, by an early landowner whose wife was from Byculla.

Bombay is in the northwestern part of Franklin County.

== History ==
Bombay is named for the wife of Michael Hogan, an Irish ship captain who grew wealthy in the East India trade. He came to the US in 1805 with his wife, whom Hogan said was an Indian princess.

Hogan bought 20,000 acres (81 km^{2}) north of the Adirondack Mountains, including the Town of Bombay, which was named in honour of his wife's birthplace. Their son, William Hogan, served as town supervisor, and was elected to the New York State Assembly in 1822. In 1829 he was appointed as a judge of the Court of Common Pleas for Franklin County, and in 1830 he was elected to Congress.

Settlement of the town began around 1805. The region was known as Macomb's Purchase, related to a massive purchase by a land speculator when New York first put up former Iroquois lands for sale. The town of Bombay was organized from part of the town of Fort Covington in 1833.

In 1877, the town was devastated by a plague of grasshoppers, which consumed more than half of the field crops.

== Geography ==
The town is in northwestern Franklin County, approximately 5 miles (8 km) south of the Canada–United States border. The town's neighbors are the St. Regis Mohawk Reservation to the northwest, the town of Fort Covington to the northeast and east, Bangor at the southeastern corner, Moira to the south, and the town of Brasher in St. Lawrence County to the west.

According to the United States Census Bureau, Bombay has a total area of 35.9 square miles (92.9 km^{2}), of which 35.8 square miles (92.6 km^{2}) is land and 0.12 square miles (0.3 km^{2}), or 0.35%, is water. The St. Regis River, a tributary of the St. Lawrence River, forms the northwestern border of the town. The Little Salmon River meanders from the south to the north through the central part of Bombay.

New York State Route 95 is a north–south route, linking New York State Route 37 in the north at Bradley's Corners with the town of Moira in the south, where Route 95 ends at U.S. Route 11. New York State Route 37 is an east/west state highway through Bombay and the Mohawk Reservation, leading west to Massena and east to Fort Covington. New York State Route 37C intersects NY-37 at Hogansburg in the northwestern corner of Bombay and leads south to Helena.

== Demographics ==
Historical population
Census	Pop.	Note	%±
1840	1,446		—
1850	1,963		35.8%
1860	2,440		24.3%
1870	1,488		−39.0%
1880	1,044		−29.8%
1890	1,496		43.3%
1900	1,489		−0.5%
1910	1,339		−10.1%
1920	1,251		−6.6%
1930	1,216		−2.8%
1940	1,140		−6.2%
1950	1,102		−3.3%
1960	1,103		0.1%
1970	1,117		1.3%
1980	1,247		11.6%
1990	1,158		−7.1%
2000	1,192		2.9%
2010	1,357		13.8%
2016 (est.)	1,314		−3.2%
U.S. Decennial Census

As of the census of 2000, there were 1,192 people, 483 households, and 327 families residing in the town. The population density was 33.3 inhabitants per square mile (12.9/km^{2}). There were 562 housing units at an average density of 15.7 per square mile (6.1/km^{2}). The racial makeup of the town was 82.89% White, 0.42% African American, 14.85% Native American, 0.08% Asian, 0.50% from other races, and 1.26% from two or more races. Hispanic or Latino of any race were 0.92% of the population.

There were 483 households. Out of these, 33.1% had children under the age of 18 living with them, 48.0% were married couples living together, 15.3% had a female householder with no husband present, and 32.1% were non-families. 28.4% of all households were made up of individuals, and 11.8% had someone living alone who was 65 years of age or older. The average household size was 2.47 and the average family size was 2.97.

In the town, the population was spread out, with 27.6% under the age of 18, 6.5% from 18 to 24, 28.9% from 25 to 44, 24.4% from 45 to 64, and 12.6% who were 65 years of age or older. The median age was 37 years. For every 100 females, there were 90.1 males. For every 100 females age 18 and over, there were 87.2 males.

The median income for a household in the town was $28,000, and the median income for a family was $34,375. Males had a median income of $27,273 versus $26,029 for females. The per capita income for the town was $14,710. About 16.4% of families and 20.9% of the population were below the poverty line, including 29.3% of those under age 18 and 13.6% of those age 65 or over.

== Communities and locations in Bombay ==
- Bombay – A hamlet in the center of the town on NY-95 near the junction of County Roads 1 and 4.
- Hogansburg – A hamlet in the northwestern corner of the town at NY-37 on the bank of the St. Regis River. It was formerly called "St. Regis Mills" and "Grays Mills".
- Pike Creek – a stream flowing north to the St. Lawrence River.
- South Bombay – A hamlet near the southern town line on County Road 32.
