= Constable, New York =

- Town
- Location within the state of New York
- Coordinates: 44°56′27″N 74°17′26″W
- Country: United States
- State: New York
- County: Franklin

Government
  - Type: Town Council
  - Town Supervisor: Richard Onufer (D)
  - Town Council: Members' List: • Clyde Wilson (D); • Ronald E. Clark (D); • Melanie A. Guerin (D); • Victoria Barber (D)

Area
  - Total: 32.82 sq mi (85.00 km^{2})
  - Land: 32.81 sq mi (84.97 km^{2})
  - Water: 0.012 sq mi (0.03 km^{2})
- Elevation: 305 ft (93 m)

Population (2010)
  - Total: 1,566
  - Estimate (2016): 1,587
  - Density: 48.4/sq mi (18.68/km^{2})
- Time zone: UTC-5 (Eastern (EST))
  - Summer (DST): UTC-4 (EDT)
- ZIP Codes: 12926 (Constable); 12953 (Malone)
- Area code: 518
- FIPS code: 36-033-17871
- GNIS feature ID: 0978863
- Website: constable-ny.squarespace.com

Constable is a town in Franklin County, New York, United States. (There is also a hamlet in the county with the same name.)

The population was 1,566 at the 2010 census. The town is named after William Constable, a member of the syndicate of original land owners. The town is in the northern part of the county, along the Canada–United States border north of Malone.

== History ==
The town of Constable was founded in 1807 from part of the town of Malone. Its territory was reduced later to form other towns: Fort Covington (1817) and Westville (1829). An early business opportunity involved "line stores", constructed so part of the shop was in Canada and the other end in the United States, allowing subtle shifting of merchandise across the border without the inconvenience of customs duties.

In June 2015, the town received national attention as David Sweat and Richard Matt, escaped convicts from the Clinton Correctional Facility in Dannemora, New York, were the subject of a three-week manhunt in the area. Matt was shot and killed in the nearby town of Malone, while Sweat remained on the run until June 28 when he was captured in Constable, two miles away from the Canada–U.S. border.

== Geography ==
According to the United States Census Bureau, the town has a total area of 32.8 square miles (85.0 km^{2}), of which 0.01 square miles (0.03 km^{2}), or 0.04%, is water.

The northern town line is the international border between the United States and Canada and is the border of Quebec.

New York State Route 122 is an east-west highway in the town. New York State Route 30 intersects NY-122 at Constable village and leads south to the village of Malone.

== Demographics ==
Historical population
| Census | Pop. | Note | %± |
|---|---|---|---|
| 1820 | 637 | | — |
| 1830 | 693 | | 8.8% |
| 1840 | 1,122 | | 61.9% |
| 1850 | 1,447 | | 29.0% |
| 1860 | 1,680 | | 16.1% |
| 1870 | 1,546 | | −8.0% |
| 1880 | 1,532 | | −0.9% |
| 1890 | 1,439 | | −6.1% |
| 1900 | 1,266 | | −12.0% |
| 1910 | 1,323 | | 4.5% |
| 1920 | 1,100 | | −16.9% |
| 1930 | 1,016 | | −7.6% |
| 1940 | 919 | | −9.5% |
| 1950 | 983 | | 7.0% |
| 1960 | 1,153 | | 17.3% |
| 1970 | 1,149 | | −0.3% |
| 1980 | 1,218 | | 6.0% |
| 1990 | 1,203 | | −1.2% |
| 2000 | 1,428 | | 18.7% |
| 2010 | 1,566 | | 9.7% |
| 2016 (est.) | 1,587 | | 1.3% |
U.S. Decennial Census

As of the census of 2000, there were 1,428 people, 533 households, and 390 families residing in the town. The population density was 43.5 inhabitants per square mile (16.8/km^{2}). There were 607 housing units at an average density of 18.5 per square mile (7.1/km^{2}). The racial makeup of the town was 97.55% White, 0.07% African American, 1.47% Native American, 0.07% Asian, and 0.84% from two or more races. Hispanic or Latino of any race were 0.14% of the population.

There were 533 households, out of which 38.1% had children under the age of 18 living with them, 58.2% were married couples living together, 9.4% had a female householder with no husband present, and 26.8% were non-families. 21.4% of all households were made up of individuals, and 7.5% had someone living alone who was 65 years of age or older. The average household size was 2.67 and the average family size was 3.03.

In the town, the population was spread out, with 28.4% under the age of 18, 6.0% from 18 to 24, 32.7% from 25 to 44, 21.0% from 45 to 64, and 11.9% who were 65 years of age or older. The median age was 36 years. For every 100 females, there were 104.3 males. For every 100 females age 18 and over, there were 103.4 males.

The median income for a household in the town was $31,029, and the median income for a family was $36,488. Males had a median income of $27,955 versus $21,354 for females. The per capita income for the town was $14,149. About 12.3% of families and 16.4% of the population were below the poverty line, including 22.5% of those under age 18 and 8.9% of those age 65 or over.

== Communities and locations in Constable ==
- Constable – A hamlet near the center of the town on Route 30 at the junction with NY-122.
- Trout River – A stream flowing northward across the border into Canada, flowing past both Constable village and the community of Trout River.
- Trout River – A hamlet on the border of Canada at the junction of NY-30 and County Road 20. The community is a port of entry and has a similarly named community across the border in Quebec.
