= Moira, New York =

- Town
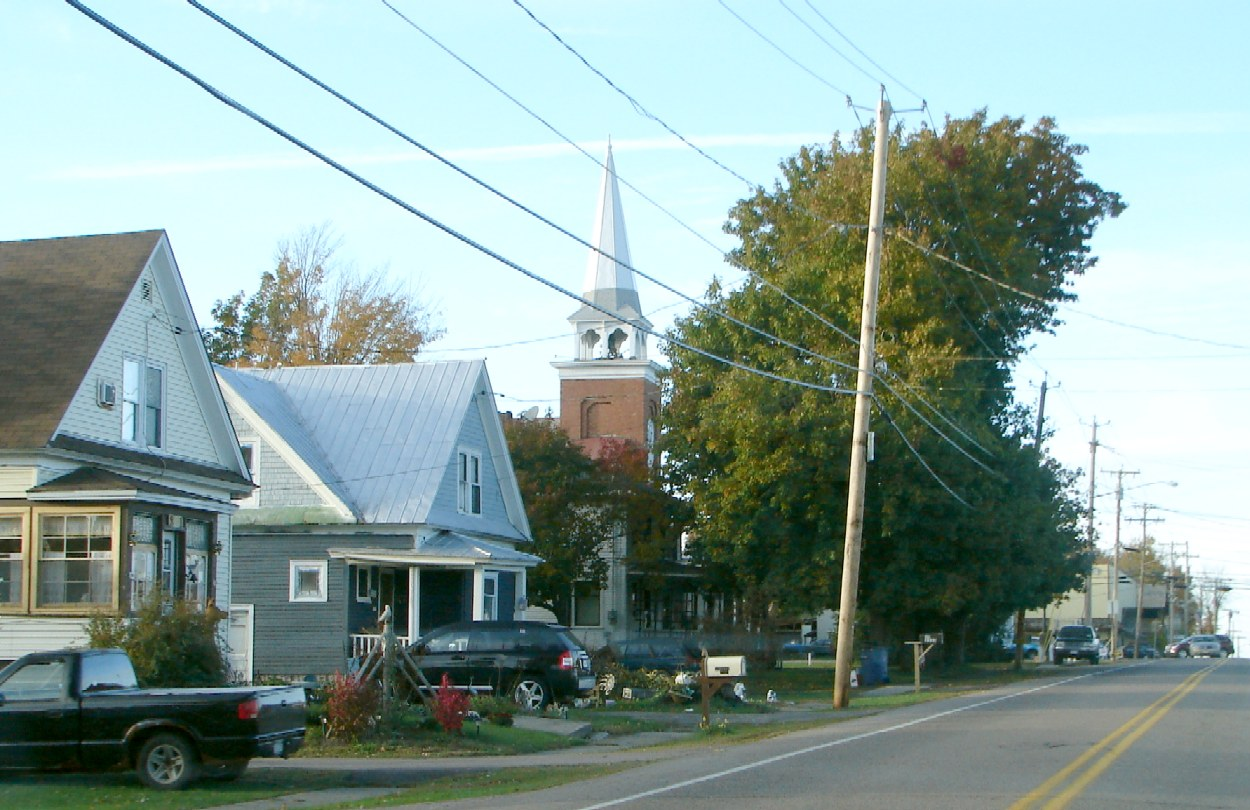

- Location within the state of New York
- Coordinates: 44°49′49″N 74°32′47″W
- Country: United States
- State: New York
- County: Franklin
- Named for: Earl of Moira

Government
  - Type: Town Council
  - Town Supervisor: Darrin Jock (D)
  - Town Council: Members' List: • Nancy H. Warner (R); • Wayne Brockway (R); • Marty J. Burnett (D); • Dawn Barney (R)

Area
  - Total: 45.23 sq mi (117.14 km^{2})
  - Land: 45.23 sq mi (117.14 km^{2})
  - Water: 0 sq mi (0.00 km^{2})
- Elevation: 377 ft (115 m)

Population (2010)
  - Total: 2,934
  - Estimate (2016): 2,813
  - Density: 62.2/sq mi (24.01/km^{2})
- Time zone: UTC-5 (Eastern (EST))
  - Summer (DST): UTC-4 (EDT)
- ZIP Codes: 12957 (Moira); 12916 (Brushton)
- Area code: 518
- FIPS code: 36-033-47933
- GNIS feature ID: 0979228
- Website: townofmoirany.gov

Moira is a town in Franklin County, New York, United States. The population was 2,934 at the 2010 census. Moira is located on the western border of Franklin County and is west of Malone. The town was named for the Earl of Moira. The correct pronunciation of Moira is moʊ-aɪ-rʌ (or moh-I-ruh).

== History ==
Settlement began circa 1803. The town was formed in 1828 from the town of Dickinson. The Ogdensburg and Lake Champlain Railroad was founded in 1849 as the Northern Railroad, running from Ogdensburg through Moira to Rouses Point. In 1883, the Northern Adirondack Railroad was built from Moira south to St. Regis Falls, a major lumbering area. In 1885, the railroad was extended southwards to Santa Clara, and by 1890 it was extended further south, eventually reaching Tupper Lake.

== Geography ==
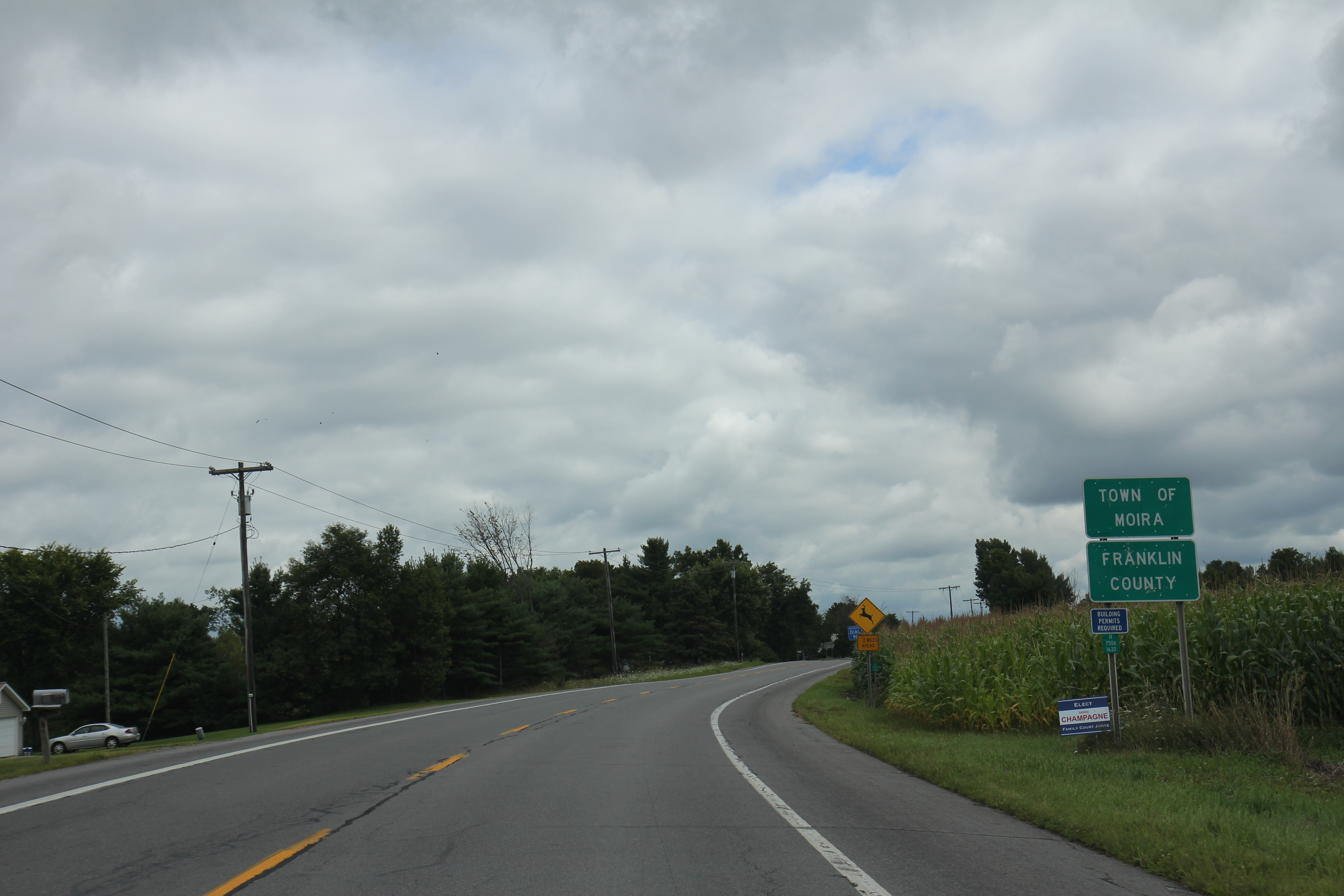
U.S. Route 11 entering Moira

According to the United States Census Bureau, the town has a total area of 45.2 square miles (117.1 km^{2}), all land.

U.S. Route 11 is an east-west highway across the town. US-11 intersects New York State Route 95, a north-south highway ending in the hamlet of Moira.

The western town line is the border of St. Lawrence County.

== Demographics ==
Historical population
Census	Pop.	Note	%±
1830	791		—
1840	962		21.6%
1850	1,340		39.3%
1860	1,796		34.0%
1870	2,064		14.9%
1880	2,254		9.2%
1890	2,512		11.4%
1900	2,484		−1.1%
1910	2,346		−5.6%
1920	2,264		−3.5%
1930	2,101		−7.2%
1940	2,072		−1.4%
1950	2,137		3.1%
1960	2,362		10.5%
1970	2,468		4.5%
1980	2,624		6.3%
1990	2,684		2.3%
2000	2,857		6.4%
2010	2,934		2.7%
2016 (est.)	2,813		−4.1%
U.S. Decennial Census

As of the census of 2000, there were 2,857 people, 1,130 households, and 775 families residing in the town. The population density was 63.2 inhabitants per square mile (24.4/km^{2}). There were 1,286 housing units at an average density of 28.4 per square mile (11.0/km^{2}). The racial makeup of the town was 98.07% White, 0.49% African American, 0.56% Native American, 0.25% Asian, 0.14% from other races, and 0.49% from two or more races. Hispanic or Latino of any race were 0.70% of the population.

There were 1,130 households, out of which 32.4% had children under the age of 18 living with them, 52.7% were married couples living together, 10.2% had a female householder with no husband present, and 31.4% were non-families. 24.3% of all households were made up of individuals, and 10.5% had someone living alone who was 65 years of age or older. The average household size was 2.51 and the average family size was 2.97.

In the town, the population was spread out, with 26.0% under the age of 18, 7.9% from 18 to 24, 28.7% from 25 to 44, 25.0% from 45 to 64, and 12.4% who were 65 years of age or older. The median age was 37 years. For every 100 females, there were 98.0 males. For every 100 females age 18 and over, there were 93.5 males.

The median income for a household in the town was $26,393, and the median income for a family was $33,047. Males had a median income of $29,779 versus $19,866 for females. The per capita income for the town was $13,270. About 14.5% of families and 18.4% of the population were below the poverty line, including 22.8% of those under age 18 and 13.4% of those age 65 or over.

== Communities and locations in Moira ==
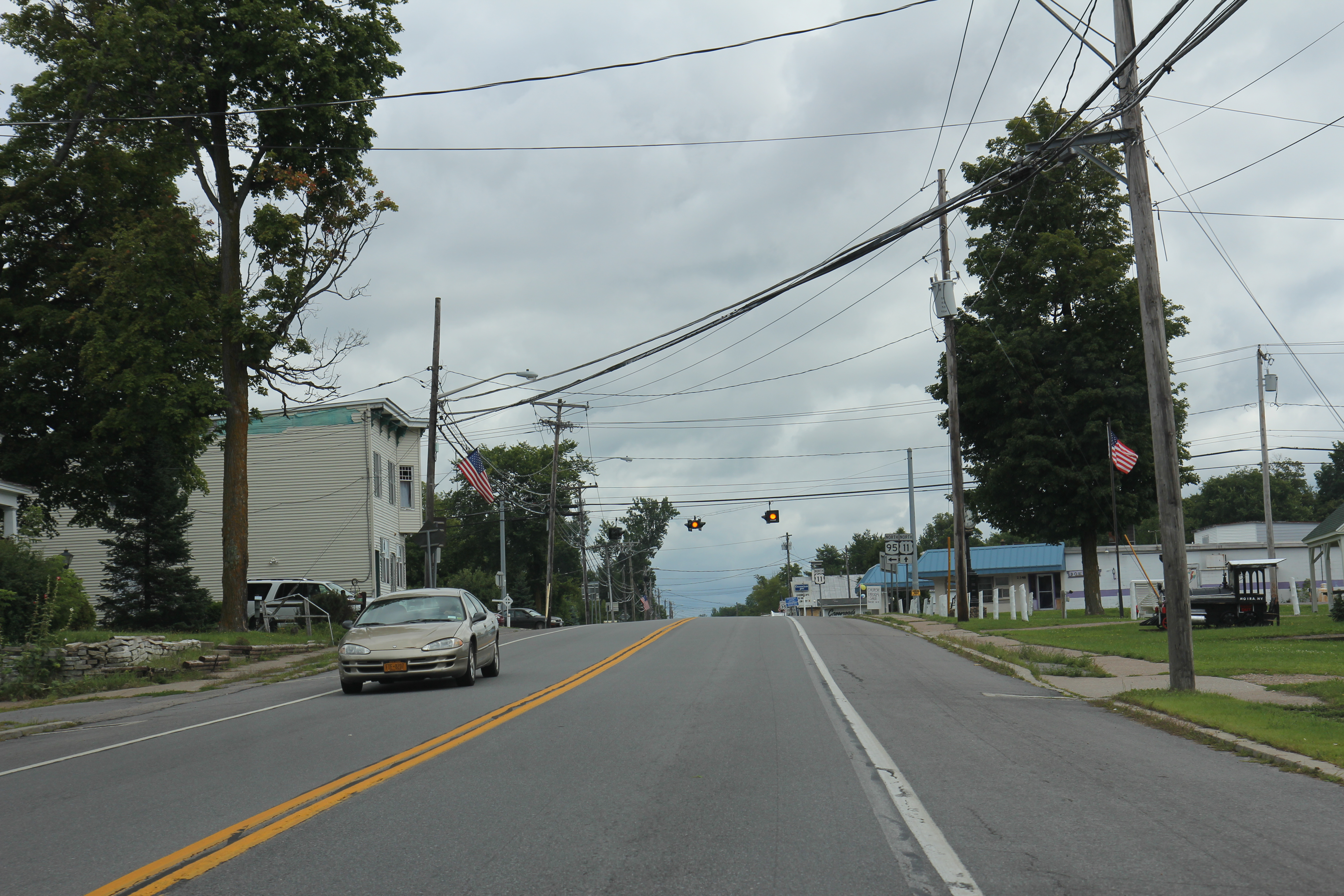
Hamlet of Moira

- Alburg – A hamlet at the southern town line on County Road 5.
- Brushton – The Village of Brushton is east of Moira hamlet on US-11 at County Road 8. It was formerly known as "Brush's Mills."
- Irish Corners – A hamlet on the southern town boundary on County Road 5, east of Alburg.
- Moira – The hamlet of Moira at the junction of US-11 and NY-95.
