= Dickinson, Franklin County, New York =

Dickinson, New York
- Town
- Location within the state of New York Dickinson (the United States)
- Coordinates: 44°43′54″N 74°32′5″W
- Country: United States
- State: New York
- County: Franklin
- Named after: Philemon Dickinson

Government
  - Type: Town Council
  - Town Supervisor: Sherry Smith (R)
  - Town Council: Members' List: • Stewart White Jr (R); • William R. Greenwood (R); • Deloris Rice (R); • Rayona Pickering (R)

Area
  - Total: 44.31 sq mi (114.77 km^{2})
  - Land: 44.22 sq mi (114.54 km^{2})
  - Water: 0.089 sq mi (0.23 km^{2})
- Elevation: 928 ft (283 m)

Population (2020)
  - Total: 1,031
  - Estimate (2016): 799
  - Density: 18.1/sq mi (6.98/km^{2})
- Time zone: UTC-5 (Eastern (EST))
  - Summer (DST): UTC-4 (EDT)
- ZIP Codes: 12930 (Dickinson Center); 12916 (Brushton); 12967 (North Lawrence); 12980 (Saint Regis Falls)
- FIPS code: 36-20610
- GNIS feature ID: 0978904

Dickinson is a town in Franklin County, New York, United States. The population was 1,031 at the 2020 census. The town was named after Philemon Dickinson, a brigadier general of the New Jersey militia during the American Revolutionary War.

Dickinson is on the western border of Franklin County, southwest of Malone and east of Potsdam.

== Geography ==
According to the United States Census Bureau, the town has a total area of 44.3 square miles (114.8 km^{2}), of which 44.2 square miles (114.5 km^{2}) is land and 0.1 square miles (0.2 km^{2}), or 0.20%, is water.

The western town line is the border of St. Lawrence County. The town is located along the northern edge of the Adirondacks.

New York State Route 11B is an east-west highway.

== Demographics ==
Historical population
Census	Pop.	Note	%±
1820	495		—
1830	446		−9.9%
1840	1,005		125.3%
1850	1,119		11.3%
1860	1,917		71.3%
1870	1,990		3.8%
1880	2,329		17.0%
1890	1,664		−28.6%
1900	1,691		1.6%
1910	1,609		−4.8%
1920	1,312		−18.5%
1930	1,061		−19.1%
1940	934		−12.0%
1950	834		−10.7%
1960	857		2.8%
1970	832		−2.9%
1980	786		−5.5%
1990	751		−4.5%
2000	739		−1.6%
2010	823		11.4%
2020	1,031		25.3%
U.S. Decennial Census

As of the census of 2020 there were 1,031 people, 293 households, and 217 families residing in the town. The population density was 16.7 inhabitants per square mile (6.4/km^{2}). There were 424 housing units at an average density of 9.6 per square mile (3.7/km^{2}). The racial makeup of the town was 97.56% White, 0.41% African American, 1.22% Native American, 0.14% Asian, and 0.68% from two or more races. Hispanic or Latino of any race were 0.41% of the population.

There were 293 households, out of which 29.7% had children under the age of 18 living with them, 57.7% were married couples living together, 8.9% had a female householder with no husband present, and 25.9% were non-families. 20.1% of all households were made up of individuals, and 8.2% had someone living alone who was 65 years of age or older. The average household size was 2.52 and the average family size was 2.88.

In the town, the population was spread out, with 24.6% under the age of 18, 6.5% from 18 to 24, 27.3% from 25 to 44, 26.4% from 45 to 64, and 15.2% who were 65 years of age or older. The median age was 39 years. For every 100 females, there were 107.0 males. For every 100 females age 18 and over, there were 101.8 males.

The median income for a household in the town was $31,711, and the median income for a family was $34,875. Males had a median income of $27,083 versus $22,039 for females. The per capita income for the town was $15,701. About 11.2% of families and 16.5% of the population were below the poverty line, including 30.1% of those under age 18 and 15.4% of those age 65 or over.

== Communities and locations in Dickinson ==
- Alburg – A hamlet on the northern town line, west of Irish Corners.
- Deer River – A stream flowing out the western town line.
- Dickinson – A hamlet on NY-11B at the junction of County Road 5. It was formerly called Harwoods Corners.
- Dickinson Center – A hamlet south of Dickinson on County Road 5. Located near Dickinson Center is the Hastings Farmstead, listed on the National Register of Historic Places in 2007.
- East Dickinson – A hamlet in the northeastern corner of the town on NY-11B.
- Irish Corners – A hamlet on the northern town line.

== Notable person ==
- Rufus E. Brown, Vermont Attorney General
