= Westville, New York =

- Town
- Location within New York Location within the United States
- Coordinates: 44°55′56″N 74°23′2″W
- Country: United States
- State: New York
- County: Franklin

Government
  - Type: Town Council
  - Town Supervisor: Rod J. Lauzon (D)
  - Town Clerk: Ann F. Brady (D)
  - Town Council: Members' List: • Michael Armstrong (D); • Vince Cartier (D); • Dean Fleury (D); • Robert H. Reynolds (D)

Area
  - Total: 34.81 sq mi (90.16 km^{2})
  - Land: 34.80 sq mi (90.13 km^{2})
  - Water: 0.015 sq mi (0.04 km^{2})
- Elevation: 249 ft (76 m)

Population (2010)
  - Total: 1,819
  - Estimate (2016): 1,809
  - Density: 52.0/sq mi (20.07/km^{2})
- Time zone: UTC-5 (Eastern (EST))
  - Summer (DST): UTC-4 (EDT)
- ZIP Codes: 12926 (Constable); 12937 (Fort Covington); 12953 (Malone); 12966 (North Bangor)
- FIPS code: 36-033-81215
- GNIS feature ID: 0979630
- Website: www.townofwestvilleny.gov

Westville is a town in Franklin County, New York, United States. As of the 2010 census, the town had a population of 1,819. Westville is on the northern border of the county, northwest of Malone.

== History ==
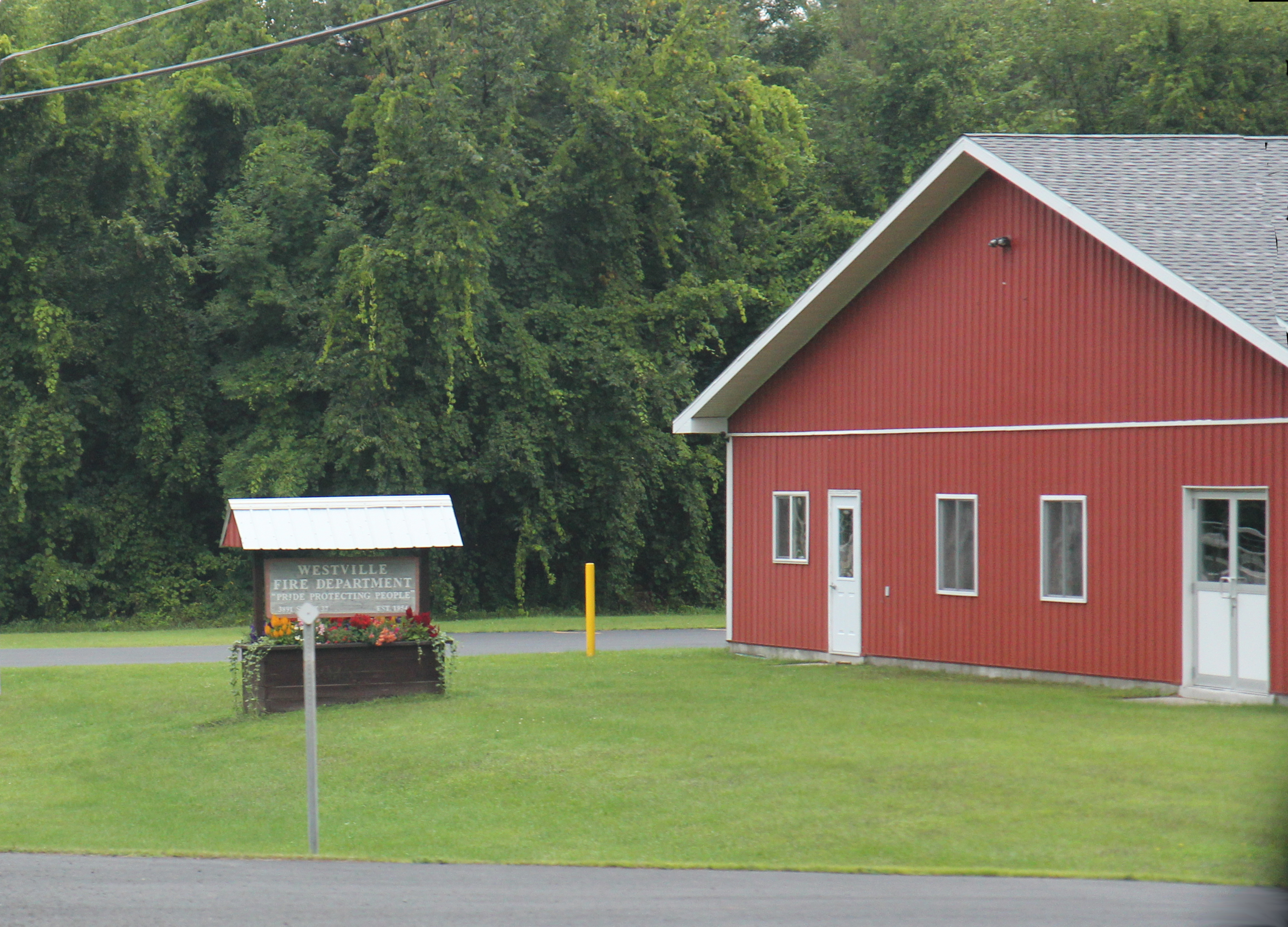
Westville Fire department

The area was first settled circa 1800. The town of Westville was formed from the town of Constable in 1829. The community has always been chiefly a farming community, with rich clay soils in the north and sandy soils in the southern part of the town. The Salmon River meanders through the township and was important to its early industry and its agriculture. In the 19th century, Westville was largely settled by Scottish and English people who had migrated from Vermont and other parts of New England. The only churches in the community were Protestant, the Presbyterian Church at Westville Corners and Methodist-Episcopal at Westville Center.

Around the time of the Civil War, there was an influx of French Canadians into northern New York, and some took up farming in the community. In the 19th century and early 20th century, there were several small industries in the community, a gristmill, a butter factory, a starch factory, and several sawmills. Most of these industries were located on the Salmon River. Over time, the industries disappeared and left only farming as the stable economic activity, as it is today.

== Geography ==
The north town line is the international border with Canada (province of Quebec). According to the United States Census Bureau, the town has a total area of 34.8 square miles (90.2 km^{2}), of which 0.02 square miles (0.04 km^{2}), or 0.04%, is water.

NY 37 intersects with NY 122 at Westville Center.

The Salmon River, a tributary of the St. Lawrence River, flows northward through the town.

== Demographics ==
Historical population
Census	Pop.	Note	%±
1830	619		—
1840	1,028		66.1%
1850	1,301		26.6%
1860	1,635		25.7%
1870	1,658		1.4%
1880	1,687		1.7%
1890	1,376		−18.4%
1900	1,237		−10.1%
1910	1,121		−9.4%
1920	1,028		−8.3%
1930	880		−14.4%
1940	831		−5.6%
1950	877		5.5%
1960	1,287		46.8%
1970	1,299		0.9%
1980	1,491		14.8%
1990	1,620		8.7%
2000	1,823		12.5%
2010	1,819		−0.2%
2016 (est.)	1,809		−0.5%
U.S. Decennial Census

As of the census of 2000, there were 1,823 people, 671 households, and 503 families residing in the town. The population density was 52.4 inhabitants per square mile (20.2/km^{2}). There were 766 housing units at an average density of 22.0 per square mile (8.5/km^{2}). The racial makeup of the town was 96.98% White, 0.66% African American, 0.82% Native American, 0.16% Asian, and 1.37% from two or more races. Hispanic or Latino of any race were 0.82% of the population.

There were 671 households, out of which 34.4% had children under the age of 18 living with them, 61.1% were married couples living together, 7.6% had a female householder with no husband present, and 25.0% were non-families. 19.4% of all households were made up of individuals, and 8.3% had someone living alone who was 65 years of age or older. The average household size was 2.71 and the average family size was 3.07.

In the town, the population was spread out, with 26.9% under the age of 18, 7.7% from 18 to 24, 30.4% from 25 to 44, 24.8% from 45 to 64, and 10.1% who were 65 years of age or older. The median age was 36 years. For every 100 females, there were 101.7 males. For every 100 females age 18 and over, there were 100.8 males.

The median income for a household in the town was $32,452, and the median income for a family was $36,964. Males had a median income of $28,167 versus $20,291 for females. The per capita income for the town was $15,809. About 9.4% of families and 12.8% of the population were below the poverty line, including 15.7% of those under age 18 and 10.5% of those age 65 or over.

== Communities and locations in Westville ==
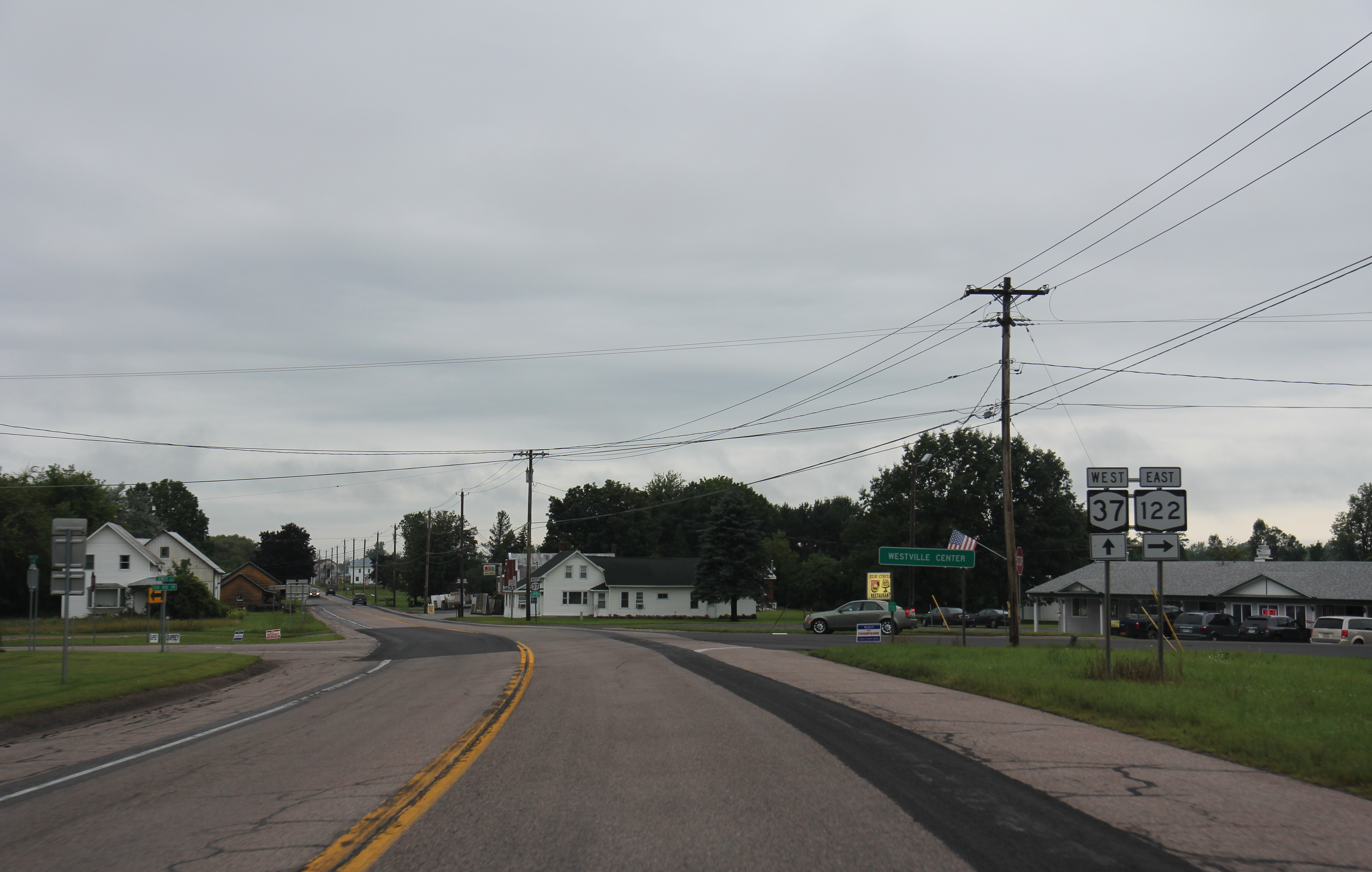
Sign for Westville Center on NY 37

- Westville – A hamlet in the northern part of the town on NY-37 at County Road 20. It was formerly called "West Constable" and "Westyville."
- Westville Center – A hamlet at the junction of NY-37, NY-122, and County Road 19, south of Westville.
