= Fort Covington, New York =

- Town
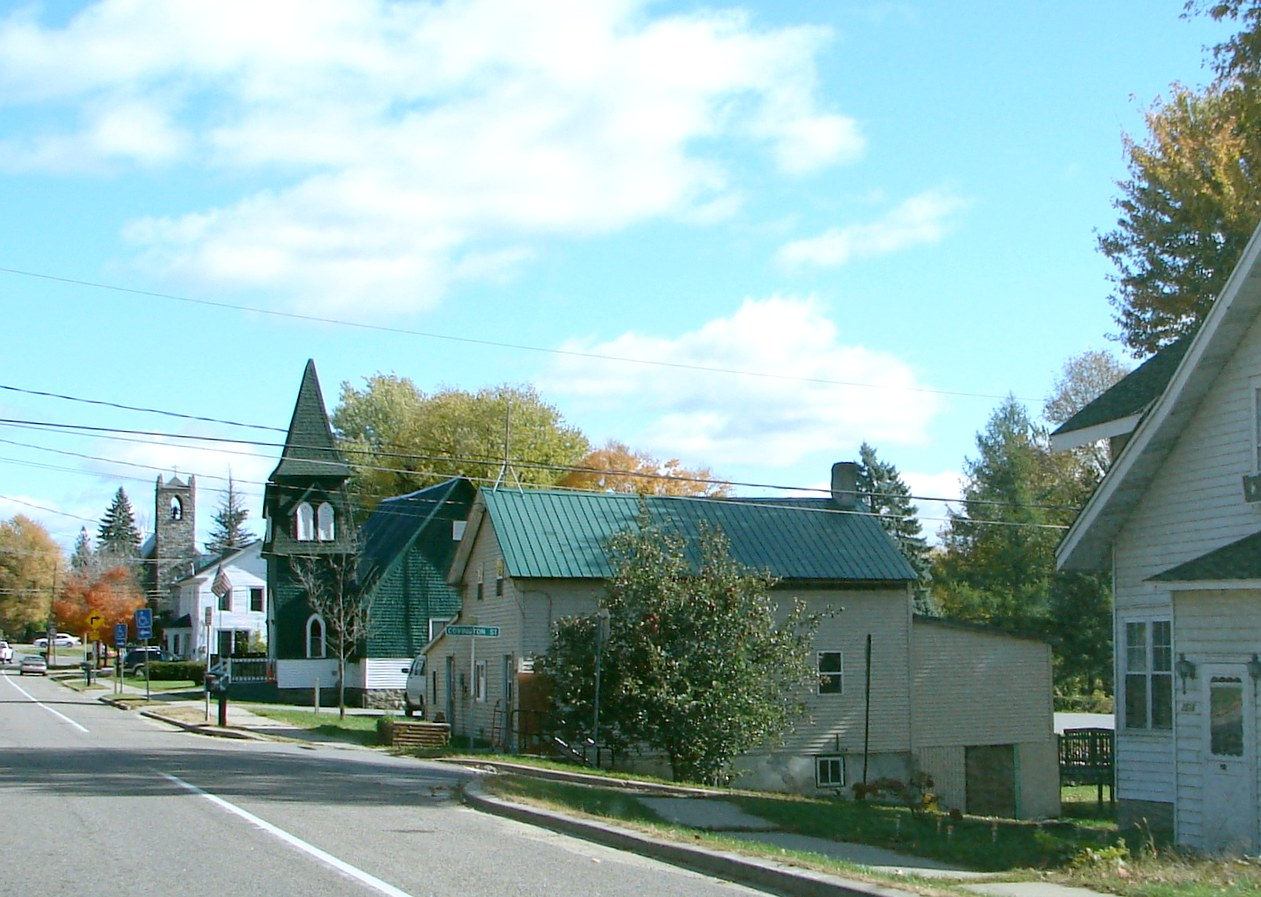

- Location within the state of New York Fort Covington (the United States)
- Coordinates: 44°59′21″N 74°29′41″W
- Country: United States
- State: New York
- County: Franklin
- Named for: Leonard Covington

Government
  - Type: Town Council
  - Town Supervisor: Patricia Manchester (D)
  - Town Council: Members' List: • Christine Benway (D); • John Cushman (D); • Paul Lauzon (D); • David J. Russell (D)

Area
  - Total: 36.73 sq mi (95.14 km^{2})
  - Land: 36.73 sq mi (95.14 km^{2})
  - Water: 0 sq mi (0.00 km^{2})
- Elevation: 187 ft (57 m)

Population (2020)
  - Total: 1,531
- Time zone: UTC−5 (Eastern (EST))
  - Summer (DST): UTC−4 (EDT)
- ZIP Codes: 12937 (Fort Covington); 12916 (Brushton); 12914 (Bombay)
- Area code: 518
- FIPS code: 36-033-26737
- GNIS feature ID: 0978966
- Highways: NY 37; R-132

Fort Covington is a town in Franklin County, New York, United States. The population was 1,531 at the 2020 census. The name is derived from a War of 1812 fortification. The original name of the town was French Mills.

The town is on the county's northern border, which is also the Canada–United States border.

== History ==
The area of what is now Fort Covington was settled during the 1790s by people from southern Canada and Vermont, who were drawn to the area by a need for people to work at the mills located on the Salmon River. The village was first named French Mills. In July 1813, a blockhouse was built here to shelter wounded soldiers and to provide a winter headquarters.

In 1817, French Mills was re-named to Fort Covington, named after Brigadier General Leonard Covington, who had been mortally wounded during the Battle of Chrysler's Farm on November 11, 1813, in the War of 1812. In 1833, the western part of Fort Covington was made into the town of Bombay.

The Fort Covington–Dundee Border Crossing was listed on the National Register of Historic Places in 2014 as the U.S. Inspection Station–Fort Covington, New York.

== Geography ==
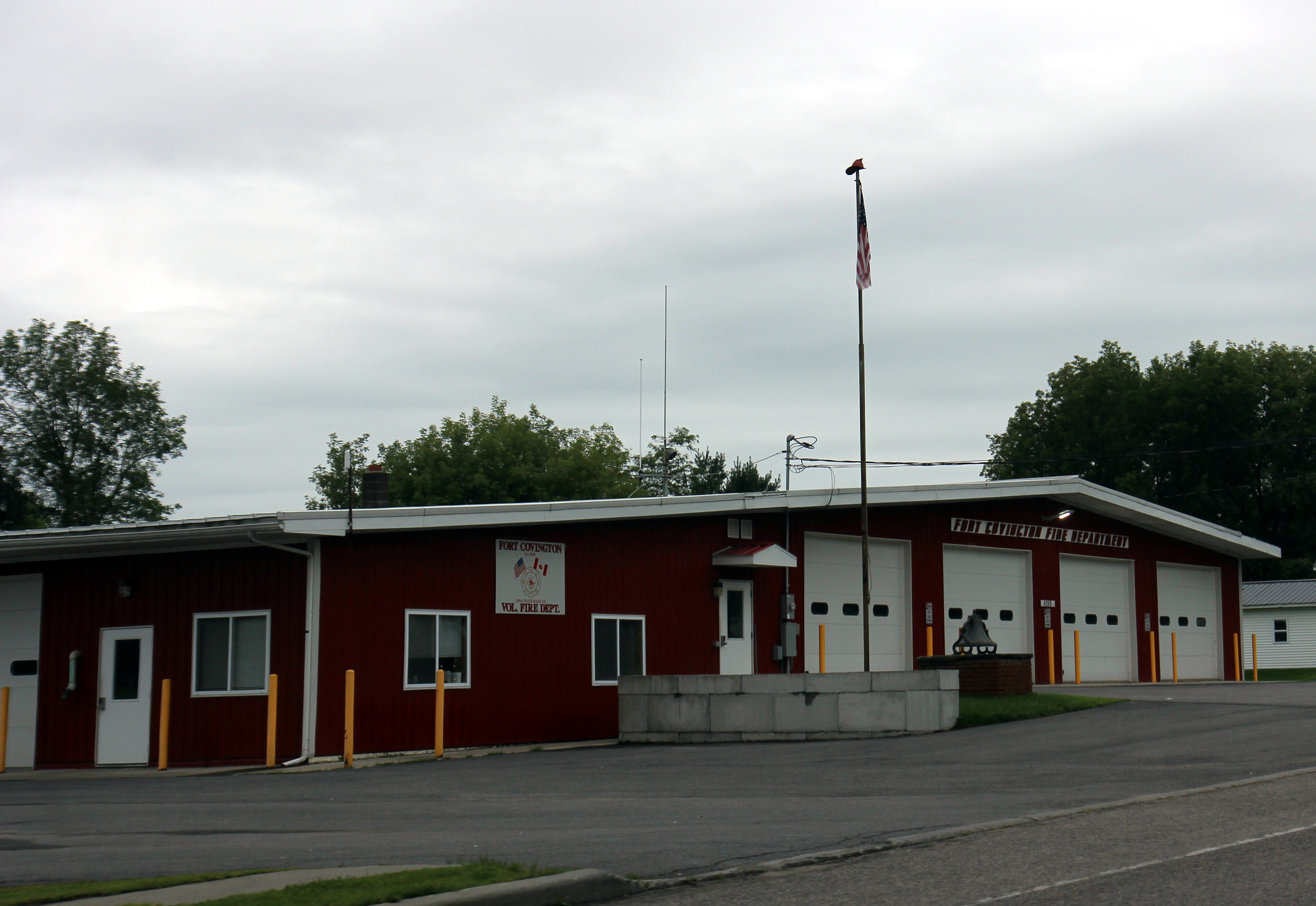
Fire department

Fort Covington is in northwestern Franklin County, in northern New York. It is bordered to the west by the St. Regis Mohawk Reservation. The northern town line is the international border with Canada (province of Quebec). According to the United States Census Bureau, the town has a total area of 36.7 square miles (95.1 km^{2}), all land.

New York State Route 37 crosses the middle of the town, leading west to Massena and southeast to Malone.

Quebec Route 132 serves the area via Dundee Road and Water Street.

== Demographics ==
Historical population
Census	Pop.	Note	%±
1820	979		—
1830	2,901		196.3%
1840	2,094		−27.8%
1850	2,641		26.1%
1860	2,757		4.4%
1870	2,436		−11.6%
1880	2,424		−0.5%
1890	2,207		−9.0%
1900	2,043		−7.4%
1910	2,028		−0.7%
1920	1,966		−3.1%
1930	1,728		−12.1%
1940	1,767		2.3%
1950	1,764		−0.2%
1960	1,905		8.0%
1970	1,963		3.0%
1980	1,804		−8.1%
1990	1,676		−7.1%
2000	1,645		−1.8%
2010	1,676		1.9%
2020	1,531		−8.7%
U.S. Decennial Census

As of the census of 2000, there were 1,645 people, 621 households, and 466 families residing in the town. The population density was 44.8 inhabitants per square mile (17.3/km^{2}). There were 706 housing units at an average density of 19.2 per square mile (7.4/km^{2}). The racial makeup of the town was 87.13% White, 0.36% African American, 10.81% Native American, 0.55% Asian, 0.30% from other races, and 0.85% from two or more races. Hispanic or Latino of any race were 1.22% of the population.

There were 621 households, out of which 34.0% had children under the age of 18 living with them, 59.4% were married couples living together, 10.1% had a female householder with no husband present, and 24.8% were non-families. 21.1% of all households were made up of individuals, and 11.1% had someone living alone who was 65 years of age or older. The average household size was 2.65 and the average family size was 3.03.

In the town, the population was spread out, with 26.7% under the age of 18, 6.9% from 18 to 24, 26.5% from 25 to 44, 25.2% from 45 to 64, and 14.7% who were 65 years of age or older. The median age was 39 years. For every 100 females, there were 90.8 males. For every 100 females age 18 and over, there were 92.5 males.

The median income for a household in the town was $31,532, and the median income for a family was $39,205. Males had a median income of $26,369 versus $22,011 for females. The per capita income for the town was $14,932. About 10.3% of families and 14.7% of the population were below the poverty line, including 19.3% of those under age 18 and 13.9% of those age 65 or over.

== Communities and locations in Fort Covington ==
- Cooks Corner – A hamlet by the southern town line at the junction of County Roads 3 and 32.
- Fort Covington – The hamlet of Fort Covington was once a village within the town, incorporated in 1889, but abandoned that status in 1976. The community is located at the junction of NY-37 and County Road 42 and is a port of entry. The area around the hamlet comprising the northern half of the entire town is now listed as the Fort Covington Hamlet census-designated place.
- Fort Covington Center – A hamlet near the southern town line on County Road 42.
- Pike Creek – A stream flowing northward through the town toward the St. Lawrence River.
- Salmon River – A stream flowing through the town.

== Notable people ==
- John P. Gray, Chicago's Cook County Sherrif 1858-1860, and his wife, Phebe Allen; in 1873 their farm was subdivided into Grayland, this name still on the Metra train stop, in what is now Irving Park, Ill.
- George Hyer, Wisconsin newspaperman, farmer and politician
- Jabez Parkhurst, local abolitionist, underground railroad station master, lawyer, and politician
- A. Warren Phelps, Wisconsin businessman and politician
