= Brushton, New York =

- Village
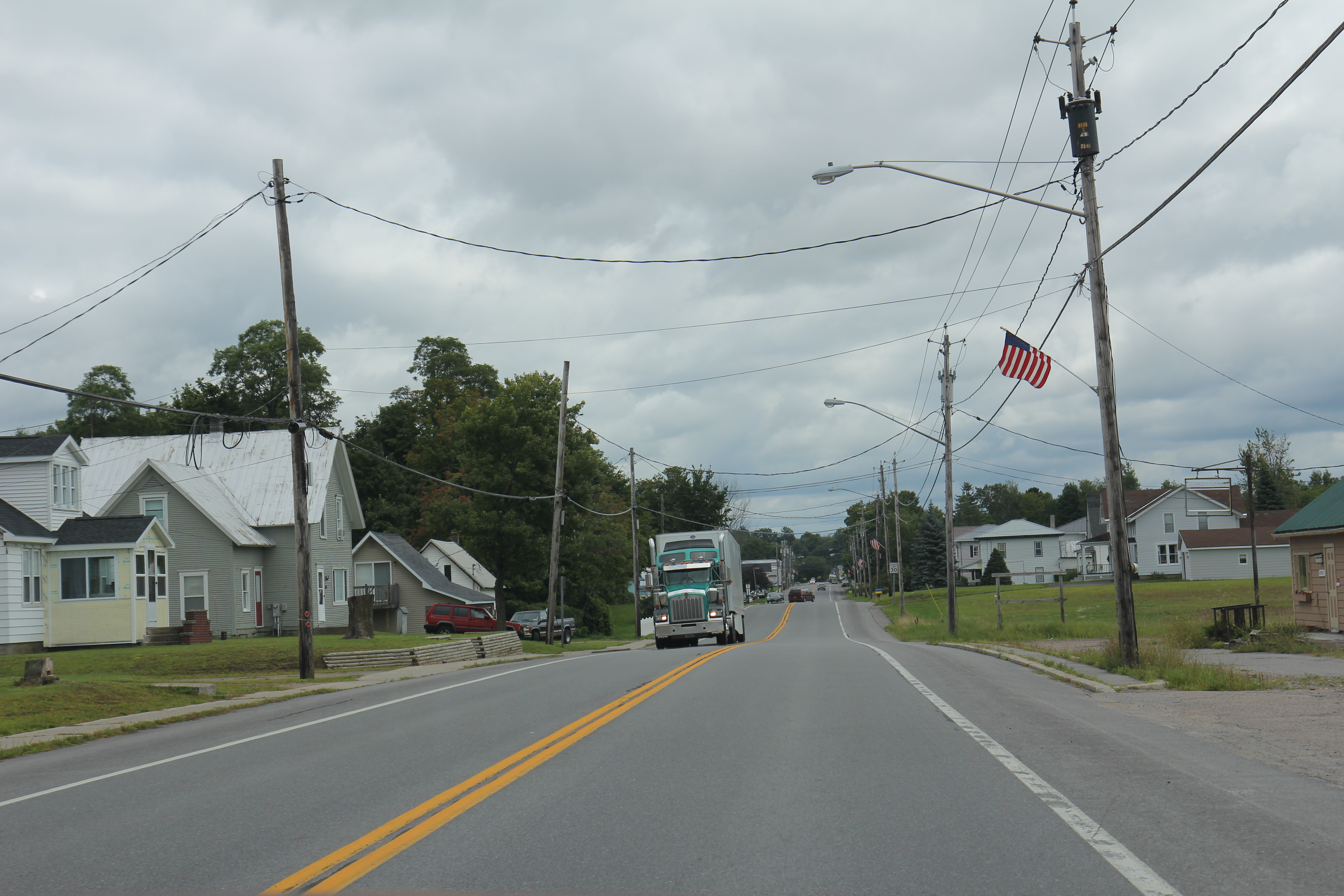
- Downtown Brushton on US11

- Location within the state of New York
- Coordinates: 44°49′51″N 74°30′52″W
- Country: United States
- State: New York
- County: Franklin
- Town: Moira
- Named after: Henry N. Brush

Area
  - Total: 0.28 sq mi (0.72 km^{2})
  - Land: 0.28 sq mi (0.72 km^{2})
  - Water: 0 sq mi (0.00 km^{2})
- Elevation: 420 ft (128 m)

Population (2020)
  - Total: 443
  - Density: 1,602.8/sq mi (618.84/km^{2})
- Time zone: UTC-5 (Eastern (EST))
  - Summer (DST): UTC-4 (EDT)
- ZIP code: 12916
- Area code: 518
- FIPS code: 36-10286
- GNIS feature ID: 0944982

Brushton is a village in Franklin County, New York, United States. As of the 2020 census, Brushton had a population of 443. The village is named after Henry Brush, a land owner.

Brushton is located in the town of Moira and is west of Malone, the county seat.

== History ==
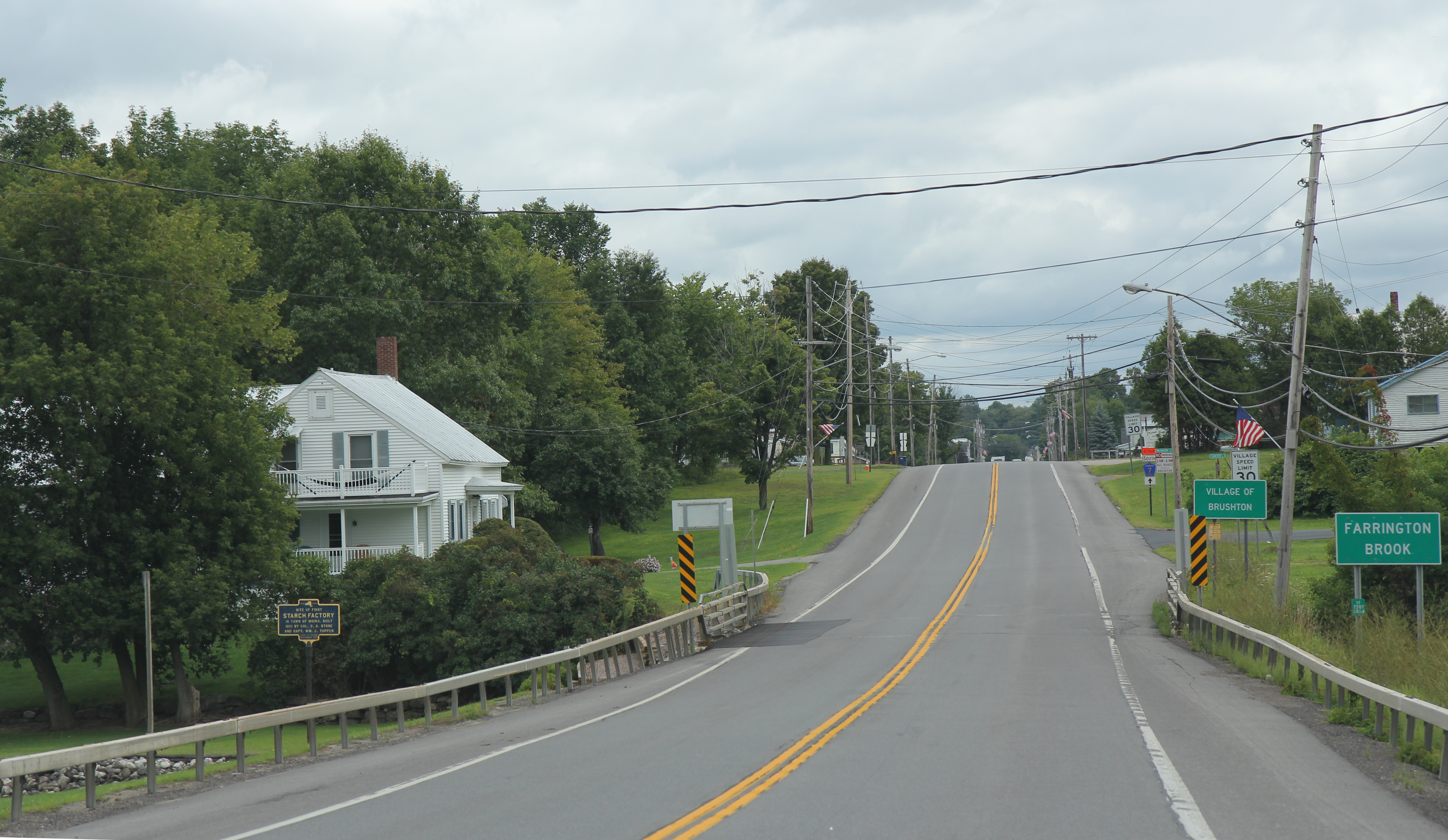
The sign for Brushton on US11.

The village took its name from Brush's Mills, which were located on the Little Salmon River. The mills were purchased by Mr. Henry N. Brush in 1835, and the hamlet was officially named "Brushton" on October 1, 1877.

From Frederick Seaver's Historical Sketches of Franklin County, NY (1918), p. 519: "The industrial enterprises of Moira were never numerous or large. The community is distinctively agricultural, but with two small unincorporated villages -- Brushton and Moira. Each is a station on the Rutland Railroad, and each is on an improved trunk-line highway. Almost with the first settlement in the town, Appleton Foote, as the agent of Gilchrist and Fowler, erected a saw mill at what is now Brushton, and a grist mill there in the year following, which was displaced by the present stone mill in 1823, built by Robert Watts, and later improved and enlarged by Henry N. Brush."

And Seaver, p. 518: "Henry N. Brush located at Brush's Mills (now Brushton) in 1835. He was a man of finished education, an engaging public speaker, and a man of strong parts. ... His holdings of land were large, and the business and industrial development of the eastern part of Moira were due largely to his activities. He died in 1872."

Brush's son, Henry Corbin Brush, was born in Brush's Mills in 1838 and was the inventor of the Brush Trolling Spoon shallow-running submersible fishing lure.

== Geography ==
Brushton is located in the eastern part of the town of Moira at 44°49′51″N 74°30′52″W (44.830736, -74.514341), in northwestern Franklin County.

According to the United States Census Bureau, the village has a total area of 0.28 square miles (0.72 km^{2}), all land.

Brushton is located on U.S. Route 11 (Washington Street) at the junction of County Road 8 (Fay-Brushton Road/Farm-To-Market Rd.). On US-11, the community of Moira is 2 miles (3 km) to the west, and North Bangor is 5.5 miles (8.9 km) to the east. Malone is 11 miles (18 km) to the east on US-11.

The Little Salmon River flows northward through the village. Via the Salmon River, its waters flow to the St. Lawrence River, just across the Canada–US border in Quebec.

== Demographics ==
Historical population
Census	Pop.	Note	%±
1880	328		—
1890	598		82.3%
1930	470		—
1940	487		3.6%
1950	516		6.0%
1960	553		7.2%
1970	547		−1.1%
1980	577		5.5%
1990	522		−9.5%
2000	479		−8.2%
2010	474		−1.0%
2020	443		−6.5%
U.S. Decennial Census

As of the census of 2000, there were 479 people, 213 households, and 119 families residing in the village. The population density was 1,727.2 inhabitants per square mile (666.9/km^{2}). There were 250 housing units at an average density of 901.4 per square mile (348.0/km^{2}). The racial makeup of the village was 98.33% White, 0.42% African American, 0.21% Native American, 0.42% Asian, and 0.63% from two or more races. Hispanic or Latino of any race were 1.25% of the population. This works out to be 471 Whites, two African Americans, one Native American, two Asians, and six Hispanics or Latinos.

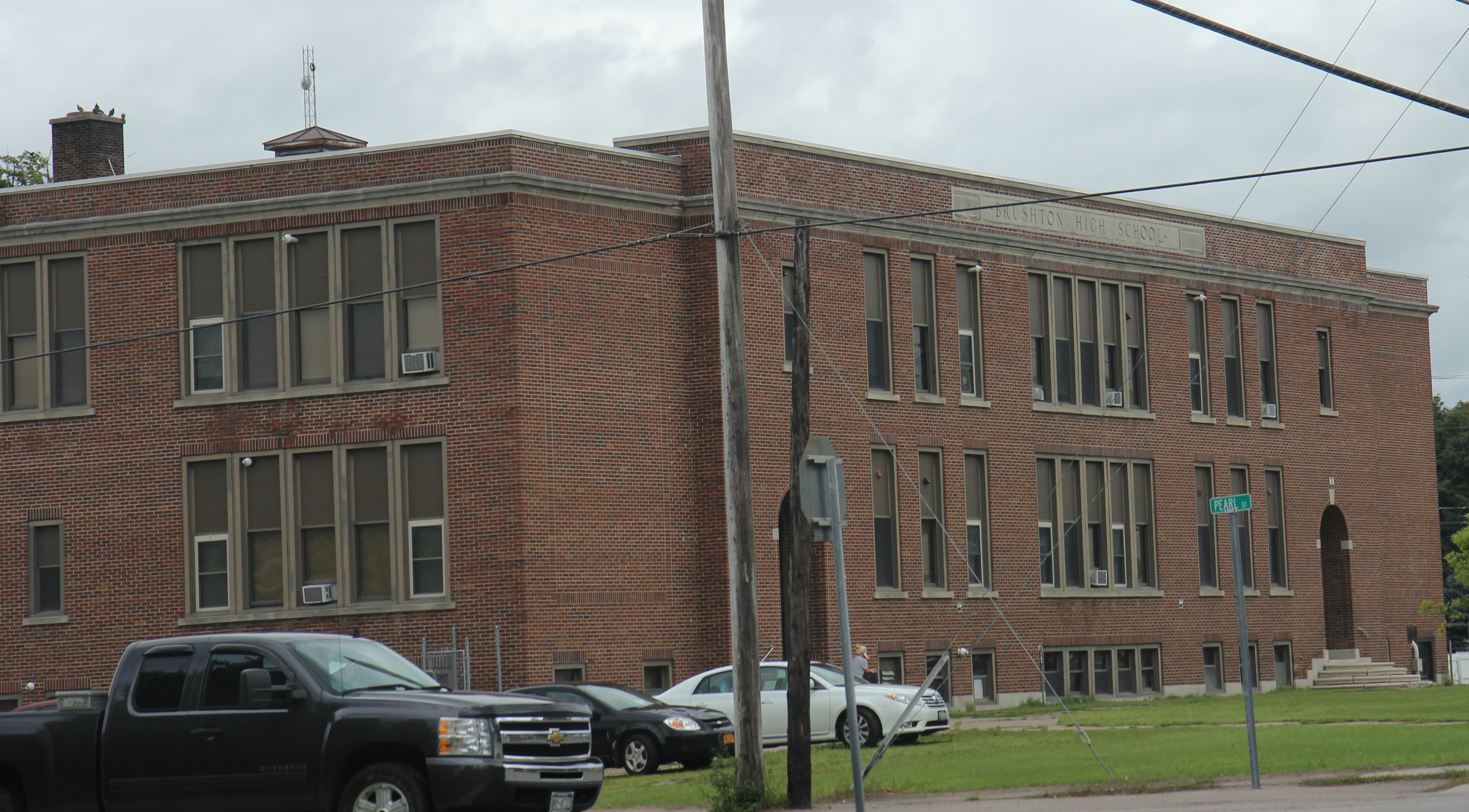
The former Brushton High School, now apartments

There were 213 households, out of which 26.8% had children under the age of 18 living with them, 42.3% were married couples living together, 8.9% had a female householder with no husband present, and 43.7% were non-families. 36.6% of all households were made up of individuals, and 18.8% had someone living alone who was 65 years of age or older. The average household size was 2.25 and the average family size was 2.96.

In the village, the population was spread out, with 24.6% under the age of 18, 7.5% from 18 to 24, 23.8% from 25 to 44, 26.1% from 45 to 64, and 18.0% who were 65 years of age or older. The median age was 40 years. For every 100 females, there were 88.6 males. For every 100 females age 18 and over, there were 92.0 males.

The median income for a household in the village was $18,750, and the median income for a family was $29,722. Males had a median income of $29,219 versus $17,292 for females. The per capita income for the village was $13,674. About 13.4% of families and 19.4% of the population were below the poverty line, including 12.4% of those under age 18 and 15.4% of those age 65 or over.
