= Calvin T. Hulburd =

American politician (1809–1897)

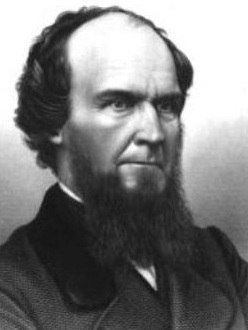

Member of the U.S. House of Representatives from New York's 17th district
- In office March 4, 1863 – March 3, 1869
- Preceded by: Socrates N. Sherman
- Succeeded by: William A. Wheeler

Member of the New York State Assembly
- In office 1842–1844
- In office 1862–1862

Personal details
- Born: Calvin Tilden Hulburd; June 5, 1809 Stockholm, New York, US
- Died: October 25, 1897 (aged 88) Brasher Falls, New York, US
- Party: Democratic (Before 1855); Republican (After 1855)
- Spouse: Jane Isabella Butterfield (m. 1842)
- Education: Middlebury College; Yale Law School
- Occupation: Attorney

Calvin Tilden Hulburd (June 5, 1809 – October 25, 1897) was a United States representative from New York during the American Civil War and Reconstruction.

== Early life ==
Born in Stockholm, New York, he completed preparatory studies and graduated from Middlebury College in Vermont. Hulburd studied law with Abraham Van Vechten, attended Yale Law School, was admitted to the bar in 1833, and started a practice in Brasher Falls, New York, an unincorporated village in the town of Brasher.

== Start of career ==
Rather than concentrate solely on the law, Hulburd focused primarily on agriculture and business. In partnership with his brother he owned and operated a large farm, gristmill and dry goods store. He also served as the Postmaster in Brasher Falls.

An Antislavery Barnburner and then Free Soil Democrat, Hulburd was a member of the New York State Assembly in 1842, 1843, and 1844.

He became a Republican when the party was organized in the mid-1850s. From 1860 to 1861 he served as Brasher's Town Supervisor, which also made him a member of the St. Lawrence County Board of Supervisors. He served again in the State Assembly in 1862.

== Later career ==
Hulburd was elected to the 38th, 39th and 40th Congresses, holding office from March 4, 1863, to March 3, 1869; while in the House he was chairman of the Committee on Public Expenditures, the predecessor of the current Committee on Oversight and Government Reform.

From 1869 to 1880, Hulburd was superintendent of construction for the New York City Post Office and Courthouse. From 1870 to 1873, he served again as Brasher's Town Supervisor.

== Death and burial ==
Hulburd died in Brasher Falls on October 25, 1897. Interment was in Fairview Cemetery.

== Honors ==
In 1867, Hulburd received an honorary Doctor of Laws (LL.D.) from Hamilton College.

== Other ==
His name sometimes appears in contemporary records and media accounts as "Hurlburd."

U.S. House of Representatives
Preceded by Socrates N. Sherman	Member of the U.S. House of Representatives from New York's 17th congressional district March 4, 1863-March 3, 1869	Succeeded by William A. Wheeler
