= Brasher Falls–Winthrop, New York =

Brasher Falls–Winthrop
- Former census-designated place
- Location within the state of New York
- Coordinates: 44°48′06″N 74°46′41″W
- Country: United States
- State: New York
- County: St. Lawrence

Area
  - Total: 4.6 sq mi (11.8 km^{2})
  - Land: 4.4 sq mi (11.5 km^{2})
  - Water: 0.12 sq mi (0.3 km^{2})

Population (2000)
  - Total: 1,140
  - Density: 257/sq mi (99.1/km^{2})
- Time zone: UTC-5 (Eastern (EST))
  - Summer (DST): UTC-4 (EDT)
- FIPS code: 36-07965

Brasher Falls–Winthrop was a census-designated place (CDP) in St. Lawrence County, New York, United States. As of the 2000 census, its population was 1,140. For the 2010 census, the area was counted as two separate CDPs: Brasher Falls (pop. 669) in the Town of Brasher and Winthrop (pop. 510) in the Town of Stockholm.

== History ==
The Dr. Buck-Stevens House was listed on the National Register of Historic Places in 1982.

== Geography ==
Brasher Falls–Winthrop is located at 44°48′6″N 74°46′41″W (44.801791, -74.778013).

According to the United States Census Bureau, the CDP has a total area of 4.6 square miles (12 km^{2}), of which, 4.5 square miles (12 km^{2}) of it is land and 0.1 square miles (0.26 km^{2}) of it (2.41%) is water.

== Demographics ==
As of the census of 2000, there were 1,140 people, 498 households, and 305 families residing in the CDP. The population density was 255.7 inhabitants per square mile (98.7/km^{2}). There were 542 housing units at an average density of 121.6 per square mile (47.0/km^{2}). The racial makeup of the CDP was 98.07% White, 0.53% African American, 0.44% Native American, 0.09% Asian, and 0.88% from two or more races. Hispanic or Latino of any race were 0.35% of the population.

There were 498 households, out of which 26.1% had children under the age of 18 living with them, 46.2% were married couples living together, 9.6% had a female householder with no husband present, and 38.6% were non-families. 34.3% of all households were made up of individuals, and 19.7% had someone living alone who was 65 years of age or older. The average household size was 2.27 and the average family size was 2.90.

In the CDP, the population was spread out, with 23.4% under the age of 18, 7.7% from 18 to 24, 24.9% from 25 to 44, 23.9% from 45 to 64, and 20.1% who were 65 years of age or older. The median age was 41 years. For every 100 females there were 89.4 males. For every 100 females age 18 and over, there were 89.0 males.

The median income for a household in the CDP was $30,505, and the median income for a family was $45,179. Males had a median income of $45,230 versus $23,421 for females. The per capita income for the CDP was $18,263. About 3.7% of families and 9.3% of the population were below the poverty line, including 12.3% of those under age 18 and 15.1% of those age 65 or over.

A portion of the Town of Lawrence is adjacent to the community. Because the three towns come together here, the area is often referred to as "Tri-Town" and many organizations and businesses in the region bear that name. The community is a short distance to the Villages of Massena, Potsdam and Malone, where most people go for services and shopping. Canadian cities, Ottawa and Montreal and the Lake Placid- Adirondack region are also within an hour or two drive.
