= U.S. Route 11 in New York =

Highway in New York, U.S.

U.S. Route 11
- US 11 highlighted in red

Route information
- Maintained by NYSDOT and the cities of Binghamton, Cortland, Syracuse, and Watertown
- Length: 318.66 mi (512.83 km)
- Existed: 1926–present
- Tourist routes: Lakes to Locks Passage

Major junctions
- South end: US 11 at the Pennsylvania state line in Kirkwood
- NY 13 / NY 41 in Cortland; I-81 / US 20 in La Fayette; I-690 / NY 5 in Syracuse; NY 3 / NY 12 in Watertown; NY 56 in Potsdam; NY 30 in Malone; I-87 near Champlain; US 9 near Champlain; US 2 in Rouses Point
- North end: R-223 at the Canadian border in Rouses Point

Location
- Country: United States
- State: New York
- Counties: Broome, Cortland, Onondaga, Oswego, Jefferson, St. Lawrence, Franklin, Clinton

Highway system
- United States Numbered Highway System; List; Special; Divided; New York Highways; Interstate; US; State; Reference; Parkways
← NY 10A	→ NY 11A

U.S. Route 11 (US 11) is a part of the United States Numbered Highway System that runs from New Orleans, Louisiana, to the Canada–United States border at Rouses Point, New York. In the state of New York, US 11 extends for 318.66 miles (512.83 km) from the Pennsylvania state line south of the Southern Tier city of Binghamton to the Canada–United States border at the North Country village of Rouses Point, where it becomes Route 223 upon entering Quebec. The portion of US 11 south of Watertown follows a mostly north–south alignment and is paralleled by Interstate 81 (I-81) while the part of the route north of Watertown follows a more east–west routing, parallel to but not directly on the St. Lawrence River.

The portion of US 11 in New York passes through the central district of four cities: Binghamton, Cortland, Syracuse, and Watertown. East of Watertown, the route traverses mostly rural terrain and serves only small villages, such as Potsdam, Malone, and Champlain. While the portion of US 11 between the Pennsylvania state line and Watertown is merely an alternate route to I-81, the section east of Watertown is the primary long-distance route across the North Country of New York.

US 11 was designated as part of the 1926 establishment of the U.S. Numbered Highway System. It was first signed in New York in 1927, replacing New York State Route 2 (NY 2), a route assigned three years earlier as part of the creation of the modern New York state route system. The termini of US 11 have more or less remained the same since; however, multiple realignments have occurred along the points in between. One of US 11's three suffixed routes, NY 11C, follows a former routing of US 11.

== Route description ==
=== South of Syracuse ===
US 11 proceeds northwestward through New York from the Pennsylvania border toward Binghamton along the eastern bank of the Susquehanna River. In the town of Kirkwood, it has a grade-separated interchange with County Route 177 (CR 177) between the Conklin–Kirkwood Bridge and CR 177's interchange with I-81, the Interstate's first exit in New York. Most of this stretch is an undivided highway; however, there is a brief divided four-lane section where the highway has a partial Y interchange with NY 990G, a connector to exit 8 on I-81 as well as NY 17 (Future I-86). This connector is part of the former routing of NY 17.

US 11 remains four lanes, now undivided, as it enters the city of Binghamton, serving as the main thoroughfare of the East Side neighborhood. This section is also known as Court Street. The highway then turns southwest, crossing railroad tracks and heading toward downtown. Here, it has an intersection with NY 7 just north of the Tompkins Street Bridge and a folded diamond interchange with NY 363. In the center of downtown, US 11 goes through a roundabout and passes Broome County Courthouse. It then has a junction with NY 434, which terminates at the highway from the south, before crossing the Court Street Bridge, after which it intersects NY 17C and turns north to follow Front Street along the Chenango River. It passes Binghamton High School and goes through a portion of the West Side neighborhood. Later, the highway again interchanges with I-81 (and NY 17) at Interstate exit 13B.

US 11 and I-81 continue to parallel each other as they head north from Binghamton toward Cortland, passing through the hamlets and villages of Hinmans Corners, Glen Castle, Castle Creek, and Whitney Point. Beyond Whitney Point, both I-81 and US 11 begin to follow the Tioughnioga River in a north-northeasterly direction, with US 11 passing through four further settlements along the river (Lisle, Marathon, Messengerville, and Blodgett Mills). Before reaching Cortland, the highway has a direct interchange with I-81 at exit 50 followed immediately by a junction with NY 41, which joins US 11 as the road enters Cortland.

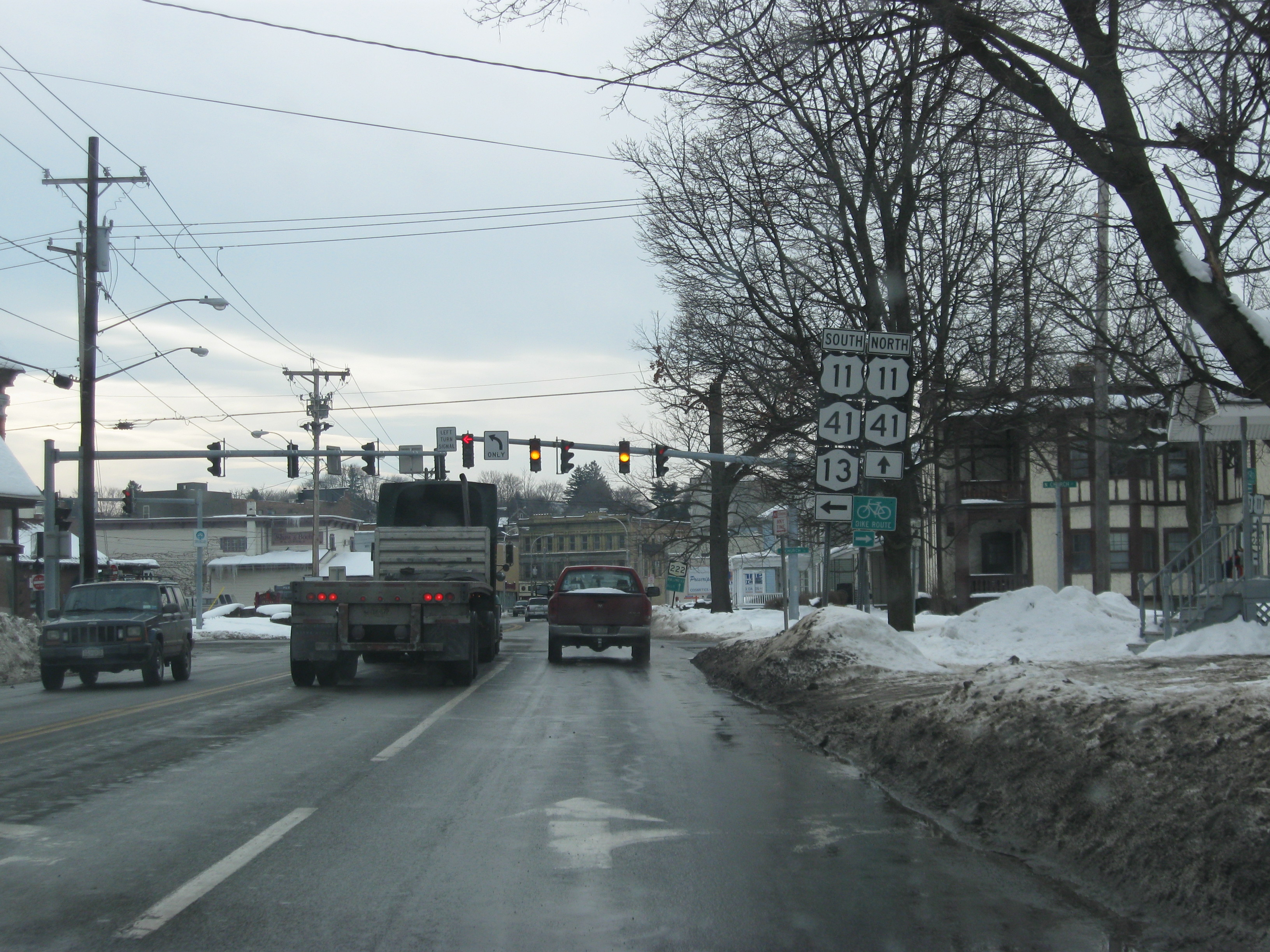
US 11 joins NY 13 and NY 41 as it passes through downtown Cortland.

The southernmost portion of US 11 in Cortland is known as Port Watson Street, but it then turns several times onto other streets (Church Street, where it has a brief concurrency with NY 13, and then Clinton Avenue and North Main Street). In downtown Cortland, US 11 passes numerous Cortland County and city offices. It exits downtown via North Main into a primarily residential area, passing the Guthrie Cortland Medical Center. US 11 continues out of the city toward the village of Homer. Another reference route, NY 930Q, connects US 11 and NY 41 to exit 54 of I-81 by two loop ramps. From here, the highway enters Homer, where it is known as Main Street. It has a junction with NY 90 at Cayuga Street, serving as that road's southern terminus. NY 41 then diverges to the northwest at Clinton Street.

US 11 crosses to the east side of I-81 as it leaves the village, passing through a rural area toward the hamlet of Tully Center. In this hamlet, US 11 briefly turns west along a concurrency with NY 80, during which it passes Tully Junior Senior High School. Just before reaching I-81, US 11 turns north again, diverging from NY 80 and running adjacent to the Interstate. Just west of here is the southern terminus of NY 11A, an alternate route for US 11 that runs east of I-81. About seven miles (11 km) north of Tully, the highway reaches its junction with US 20 in the hamlet of LaFayette in the town of the same name. The northbound side of I-81 exit 73 connects to US 11, with the southbound side connecting to US 20. The highway continues through a rural residential area north of the hamlet. It then begins to closely front I-81 before passing under it at exit 78, after which US 11 briefly becomes divided as it traverses Onondaga Reservation. It then enters Nedrow, which marks the beginning of the southern suburbs of Syracuse in the town of Onondaga, where NY 11A again meets US 11 at the former's northern terminus.

The highway follows Salina Street through most of Syracuse and its southern suburbs, passing through residential areas with occasional commercial stretches until reaching downtown. US 11 is parallel to Onondaga Creek for most of its length in Syracuse. It intersects NY 173 in the North Valley neighborhood, then passes through Brighton, where the surroundings remain largely residential with some businesses and churches. In Southwest, US 11 shifts east at Raynor Avenue to follow State Street. As it enters the southern reaches of downtown, the Oncenter complex is a prominent feature on the west side of the highway, with the Everson Museum of Art on the east side. NY 92 terminates from the east as East Genesee Street. Erie Boulevard (NY 5) intersects the highway three blocks beyond here, followed by the western terminus of NY 290 after US 11 crosses under I-81 Bus and I-690. After passing St. Joseph's Hospital in Near Northeast, US 11 switches back to follow Salina Street through the southern part of Washington Square, where it has a junction with NY 298 (Court Street). The route then turns north-northeastward on Wolf Street, which it follows through the remainder of Washington Square and into the northern suburbs of Syracuse.

=== Syracuse to Watertown ===
As it enters the hamlet of Mattydale, US 11 crosses under the New York State Thruway (I-90) and its name changes from Wolf Street to Brewerton Road. It is a six-lane divided highway on its entire length through Mattydale. As it passes through a commercial area west of Syracuse Hancock International Airport, the road becomes two lanes (later four) with a center turn lane. South Bay Road runs closely parallel to US 11 in this stretch. In North Syracuse, the road reverts to two lanes but becomes four lanes again north of this village, where it crosses under NY 481 and passes through another major commercial area.

Continuing north, US 11 intersects NY 31 in the hamlet of Cicero. It passes through Brewerton, then crosses the Oneida River into Oswego County and passes Fort Brewerton. The next two miles (3.2 km) of US 11 run through a light-industrial area on its way to Central Square, where it intersects NY 49. North of here, the highway reaches the hamlet of Hastings and later Colosse, where it intersects NY 69, and Maple View, where it intersects NY 104. In Pulaski, it runs on Salina and Jefferson streets and crosses the Salmon River. After passing through the village of Sandy Creek, the road crosses under I-81 at the exit 134 interchange. It passes through Mannsville and then intersects NY 193 (which terminates at US 11 from the west) at Pierrepont Manor Complex. US 11 continues through a rural area to the village of Adams, where NY 178 also terminates from the west. NY 177 terminates in the same manner in the next hamlet, Adams Center. It has a modified full Y interchange with Kellogg Road, which connects to I-81's exit 149, the last exit accessible directly from US 11 (since it separates from the Interstate just north of Watertown).

Just south of Watertown, NY 232 joins US 11 (and terminates) from the southwest. As it enters Watertown, US 11 curves from a northeast–southwest to north–south alignment and follows Washington Street. The route later turns onto Paddock, Holcomb, Massey, and Leray streets and crosses the Black River via the Court Street Bridge (unrelated to the bridge of the same name that carries US 11 in Binghamton). The highway intersects NY 3 and NY 12 at Arsenal Street. Along Massey Street, it has a concurrency with NY 12 between Arsenal and Main streets and intersects NY 12F at Coffeen Street, which terminates from the west. North of the city, it also has a junction with NY 37 which is that road's western terminus (though it approaches from the west).

=== North Country ===
US 11 heads northeast from Watertown, passing north of the Adirondack Park and serving several communities—such as the villages of Canton, Malone, and Potsdam—built up along its northern edge. Although the road never crosses the Blue Line delimiting the Adirondack Park, it passes through mostly rural, undeveloped areas nonetheless.

After US 11 passes through Calcium, it parallels the western boundary of Fort Drum, whose main gate is just east of the highway's junction with I-781. Past Fort Drum, the route follows a northeasterly routing across northern Jefferson County and southwestern St. Lawrence County, serving the villages of Evans Mills, Philadelphia, Antwerp, Gouverneur, and Richville and overlapping with NY 26 between Evans Mills and Philadelphia and with NY 812 for several miles north from Gouverneur. US 11 eventually reaches the village of Canton, where it follows Gouverneur and Main streets and intersects NY 68 and NY 310.

At the next village, Potsdam, the highway becomes four lanes and runs along the northern edge of Clarkson University's campus as Maple Street before crossing the Raquette River via a divided alignment known as Sandstone Drive, where it intersects the southern terminus of NY 345 and is paralleled by a railroad bridge. (The former alignment of US 11, the eastern portion of Maple Street, follows a concrete arch bridge over the river south of the current crossing. It is assigned as reference route NY 971U.) After US 11 intersects NY 345 and NY 56, NY 11B breaks from US 11, serving as a southerly alternate route to the U.S. Highway. NY 11B heads due east from Potsdam on Elm Street while US 11 exits to the northeast via Lawrence Avenue. About 10 miles (16 km) northeast of Potsdam, US 11 intersects the west end of NY 11C, the northernmost of its three alternate routes in New York. While NY 11C heads to the northeast to reach the hamlets of Brasher Falls and Winthrop, US 11 turns to the east, bypassing both locations to the south. It also intersects the southern terminus of NY 420 and passes through numerous small hamlets such as Sandfordville, Stockholm Center, and Lawrenceville in the towns of Stockholm and Lawrence. NY 11C rejoins US 11 eight miles (13 km) later just west of Lawrenceville.

The highway soon enters Franklin County, where it intersects NY 95 in the hamlet of Moira and continues to the village of Brushton, where its alignment is known as Washington Street. It crosses the Little Salmon River in this village. After passing through another hamlet known as North Bangor, US 11 reaches the village of Malone, where it follows Main Street, divided into East and West Main streets by the Salmon River (unrelated to the other Salmon River to the south). Here, NY 11B rejoins as the highway intersects NY 30 and NY 37. It is briefly concurrent with NY 30 as it crosses the river.

East of Malone, US 11 takes on a more northerly heading for roughly 15 miles (24 km), passing through Chateaugay and intersecting NY 374 in the community's center. Eventually, it curves back to the southeast, serving Ellenburg and NY 190 before resuming a northeasterly alignment that takes the route through Mooers and into the village of Champlain. In the latter, US 11 connects to I-87 at exit 42 and meets US 9 at a junction a half-mile (0.80 km) to the east of I-87. The route continues on, following a mostly linear east–west alignment across the town of Champlain for four miles (6.4 km) to the shores of Lake Champlain and the village of Rouses Point. Along the way, US 11 connects to the west end of NY 276.

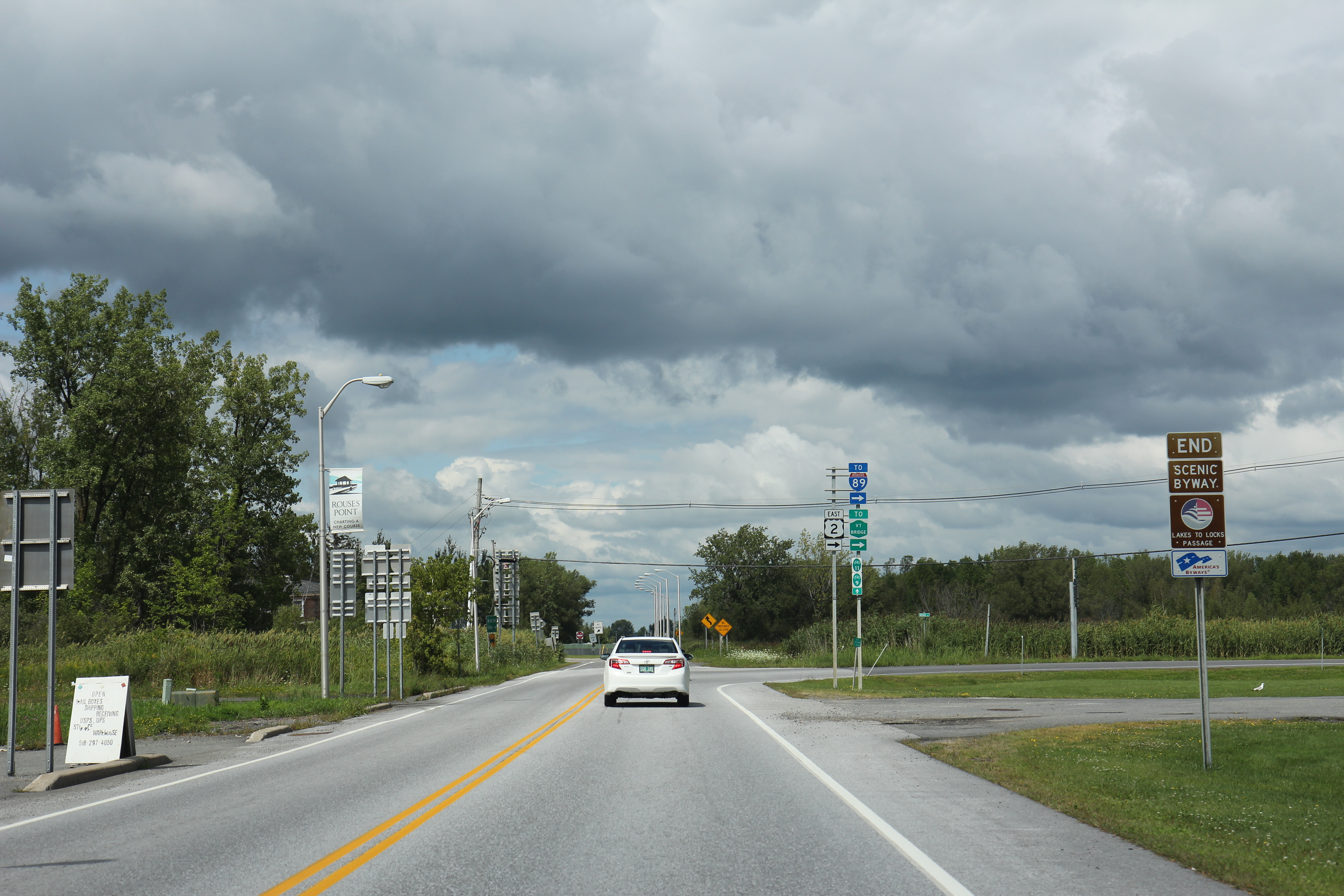
Northern terminus

In Rouses Point, US 11 becomes known as Champlain Street as it heads toward the lake shore. At the shoreline, Champlain Street ends as US 11 intersects NY 9B (Lake Street). US 11 turns north onto Lake Street at the junction, following the routing established by NY 9B to the south into the heart of Rouses Point. Here, US 11 reconnects to NY 276, which enters from the west on Pratt Street. North of the village center, US 11 intersects the western terminus of the eastern segment of US 2. After another three-quarters of a mile (1.21 km), US 11 terminates at the Canada–United States border, through the Rouses Point–Lacolle 223 Border Crossing. Route 223 continues north from here to Sorel-Tracy in Quebec.

== History ==
=== Origins ===
Between Syracuse and Binghamton, the road was known as the Salina and Chenango Point Turnpike. The company that built the road was incorporated in 1807. The road opened trade between Binghamton and the salt harvesting operations below Onondaga lake.

Most of the modern US 11 corridor between Cortland and Rouses Point was assigned an unsigned legislative route designation when the New York State Legislature created a statewide legislative route system in 1908. From Cortland north to Syracuse, what is now US 11 was part of Route 10, which continued southeast from Cortland to Afton. Between Syracuse and Colosse, it was designated as Route 33. At Colosse, Route 28 joined current US 11 and followed it to Maple View, where it ended at Route 30 (now NY 104). Route 30 joined modern US 11 here and generally followed it through Watertown to Rouses Point. The most significant deviation from what is now US 11 was between Potsdam and Lawrenceville, where Route 30 used modern NY 11B and CR 54 and CR 55 (both formerly NY 195) instead.

Other, shorter sections of US 11 were included as part of legislative routes that mostly followed another corridor across the state. From Binghamton east to Kirkwood Center, modern US 11 was part of Route 4, an east–west route that extended across the Southern Tier and the Catskill Mountains from Lake Erie to the Hudson River. The segment of current US 11 from Binghamton north to Hinmans Corners was the southernmost portion of Route 8, which went northeast to the Utica area on modern NY 12 and NY 12B. In 1911, much of current US 11 between Cortland and Whitney Point was designated as part of Route 4-a, a new route that extended southeast to Chenango Forks and south from there to Binghamton. On March 1, 1921, the portion of Route 4-a northwest of Chenango Forks became part of Route 10, which now split into east and west branches east of Cortland as a result.

=== Designation and realignments ===
In 1924, the state of New York created the modern New York state route system by assigning designations to several long-distance highways. One route assigned at this time was NY 2, which extended from the Pennsylvania state line south of Binghamton to the Canada–United States border at Rouses Point by way of Syracuse and Watertown. When the Joint Board on Interstate Highways laid out the initial plans for the U.S. Numbered Highway System in October 1925, NY 2 was included as part of US 11, a route beginning in New Orleans, Louisiana, and ending at Rouses Point. The alignment of US 11 within New York was virtually unchanged in the final system alignment approved on November 11, 1926. The US 11 designation was first signed in 1927, supplanting NY 2.

Since 1927, the terminuses of US 11 have more or less remained the same. However, multiple realignments have occurred over the years along the points in between. In De Kalb, US 11 originally followed Old Northerner Road, modern NY 812, and CR 17. It was moved onto its current alignment in the area c. 1936. In the vicinity of Champlain, US 11 initially entered the village on Perry Mills Road and followed Main and Elm streets through the village. US 11 was realigned c. 1962 to follow a direct east–west highway between the hamlet of Twin Bridges (the modern junction of US 11 and Perry Mills Road) and the village of Champlain. Within Champlain, US 11 was routed on South, Main, and Elm streets. The highway was realigned again in the early 1970s to follow a new highway to the south of Champlain, bypassing the village completely.

In northeastern St. Lawrence County, US 11 originally served the neighboring hamlets of Brasher Falls and Winthrop. The route left its modern alignment in Stockholm (at Stockholm Center) and rejoined it in Lawrence (at Coteys Corner). On September 1, 1982, ownership and maintenance of CR 110, a county road extending from Stockholm Center to Coteys Corner on a direct east–west routing, was transferred from St. Lawrence County to the state of New York as part of a highway maintenance swap between the two levels of government and the village of Canton. The new state highway was initially designated as NY 11C. On June 13, 1992, the alignments of US 11 and NY 11C between Stockholm Center and Coteys Corner were swapped, placing both routes on their modern alignments.

== Future ==
Future Interstate 98
- Location: Watertown–Champlain
- Length: 140 mi (230 km)

Plans for the Rooftop Highway, a proposed limited-access highway that would extend for 175 miles (282 km) from Watertown to Champlain, first surfaced in the 1950s. If built, the highway would likely follow the US 11 corridor across the northern part of North Country, connecting I-81 to I-87. The project is expected to create more than 27,000 jobs throughout the North Country and is expected to take as many as 15 years to complete.

A study called the North Country Transportation Study Action Plan and Final Technical Report suggests that the road would likely be built to Interstate Highway standards in order to improve constrained transit systems due to a lack of infrastructure throughout the area. Backers of the project have called for the highway to be designated as I-98; however, this designation has not been recognized by any government agencies, such as the New York State Department of Transportation or the American Association of State Highway and Transportation Officials (AASHTO). The number does fit into AASHTO's numbering system, though, as the highest even numbers are designated for highways running along the Canada–United States border, such as the proposed highway.

The Northern Corridor Transportation Group (NCTG) was formed in December 2008 as a means of refocusing the 50-year discussion on the project. Since that time, more than 100 municipal and civic resolutions from the five northern counties of New York have been passed in support of the construction of the project. On July 16, 2009, the NCTG submitted a request to U.S. Senator Kirsten Gillibrand to direct $800 million (equivalent to $1.13 billion in 2024) toward the project as part of the reauthorization of a federal highway transportation bill. In a historic move, the six northern legislators representing the North Country in the New York State Legislature (Senators Darrel Aubertine, Joseph Griffo, and Betty Little and Assembly Members Dede Scozzafava, Addie Jenne, and Janet Duprey) signed an official letter of request to the same end.

Despite enthusiasm from North Country leaders, the project has so far failed to gain approval. In 2014, DOT Commissioner Joan McDonald fielded questions at an Albany budget hearing after governor Andrew Cuomo had announced in his State of the State proposal that his administration would spend $2.5 million on a feasibility study. While Commissioner McDonald was receptive to the idea of the highway, she announced that the DOT likely wouldn't pursue the project based on traffic studies that had performed in 2002 and 2006.

== Suffixed routes ==
US 11 has three suffixed routes, all of which serve as alternate routes to US 11. NY 11A and NY 11B were assigned as part of the 1930 renumbering of state highways in New York, while NY 11C was assigned in 1982.

- NY 11A (13.11 mi or 21.10 km) runs to the west of US 11 between Tully and Onondaga. It serves as the primary north–south highway through Onondaga Reservation.
- NY 11B (36.98 mi or 59.51 km) extends from Potsdam to Malone along a routing situated south of US 11.
- NY 11C (11.44 mi or 18.41 km) is a northerly alternate to US 11 between Stockholm and Lawrence. While US 11 follows a direct routing through the two towns, NY 11C veers north to serve Brasher Falls and Winthrop, two small hamlets on the banks of the St. Regis River.

== Major intersections ==
County	Location	mi	km	Destinations	Notes
Broome	Kirkwood	0.00	0.00	US 11 south – Great Bend	Continuation into Pennsylvania
Broome	Kirkwood			To I-81 / NY 7 / Cedarhurst Road – Conklin	Interchange
Broome	Kirkwood	7.48	12.04	To I-81 / I-86 / NY 17	Access via NY 990G
Broome	Kirkwood			To NY 7 / Colesville Road – Industrial Park, Conklin	Interchange
Broome	City of Binghamton	11.73	18.88	NY 7 (Tompkins Street / Brandywine Avenue)	
Broome	City of Binghamton			NY 363 to I-81 / Future I-86 west / NY 17 west – Vestal	Interchange
Broome	City of Binghamton	12.59	20.26	State Street (NY 434 west)	
Broome	City of Binghamton	12.83	20.65	NY 17C west (Main Street)	Eastern terminus of NY 17C
Broome	Dickinson	14.73	23.71	I-81 to I-88 east / Future I-86 / NY 17 – Scranton, Syracuse	Exit 13B (I-81)
Broome	Chenango	17.37	27.95	I-81 south	Exit 16 (I-81)
Broome	Chenango	17.49	28.15	NY 12 north to I-88 east – Chenango Bridge, Norwich	Southern terminus of NY 12
Broome	Chenango	17.72	28.52	I-81 north – Syracuse	Exit 16 (I-81)
Broome	Chenango	22.90	36.85	I-81 – Whitney Point, Syracuse, Binghamton	Exit 21 (I-81)
Broome	Whitney Point	30.46	49.02	NY 26 south to I-81 south – Binghamton, Endicott	Southern terminus of US 11 / NY 26 overlap
Broome	Whitney Point	30.55	49.17	NY 26 north / NY 79 east to NY 206 east / Main Street – Greene	Northern terminus of US 11 / NY 26 overlap; southern terminus of US 11 / NY 79 overlap
Broome	Town of Triangle	31.48	50.66	I-81 north – Cortland, Syracuse	Exit 30 (I-81)
Broome	Town of Lisle	32.76	52.72	NY 79 west – Richford, Ithaca	Northern terminus of US 11 / NY 79 overlap
Cortland	Village of Marathon			I-81 south – Binghamton	I-81 exit 38
Cortland	Village of Marathon	39.59	63.71	NY 221 to I-81 north – Syracuse, Cortland	
Cortland	Virgil	43.69	70.31	NY 392 west – Virgil	Eastern terminus of NY 392
Cortland	Cortlandville	51.29	82.54	I-81 south – Marathon, Binghamton	Exit 50 (I-81)
Cortland	Cortlandville	51.51	82.90	NY 41 south to I-81 north – McGraw, Syracuse	Southern terminus of US 11 / NY 41 overlap
Cortland	Cortland	53.84	86.65	NY 13 south (Port Watson Street) – Dryden, Ithaca	Southern terminus of US 11 / NY 13 overlap
Cortland	Cortland	54.15	87.15	NY 13 north (Clinton Avenue) to I-81	Northern terminus of US 11 / NY 13 overlap; southern end of NY 222 overlap
Cortland	Cortland			NY 222 west (Groton Avenue)	Northern end of NY 222 overlap
Cortland	Village of Homer	56.17	90.40	To I-81 (via NY 930Q) – Syracuse, Binghamton	Interchange; exit 54 (I-81)
Cortland	Village of Homer	56.78	91.38	NY 90 north (Cayuga Street)	Southern terminus of NY 90
Cortland	Village of Homer	57.07	91.85	NY 41 north (Clinton Street)	Northern terminus of US 11 / NY 41 overlap
Onondaga	Village of Tully	68.76	110.66	NY 80 east (Clinton Street) – Highland Forest	Southern terminus of US 11 / NY 80 overlap
Onondaga	Town of Tully	69.41	111.70	NY 80 west / NY 281 south to I-81 south	north terminus of US 11 / NY 80 overlap; northern terminus of NY 281
Onondaga	Town of Tully	70.04	112.72	I-81 north – LaFayette, Syracuse	Exit 67 (I-81)
Onondaga	LaFayette	76.09	122.45	US 20 to I-81 south – Skaneateles, Cazenovia	
Onondaga	LaFayette			I-81 north – Syracuse	I-81 exit 73
Onondaga	Onondaga	81.14	130.58	I-81 – Binghamton, Syracuse	Exit 78 (I-81)
Onondaga	Onondaga	81.97	131.92	NY 11A south	Northern terminus of NY 11A
Onondaga	Syracuse	84.06	135.28	NY 173 (Seneca Turnpike)	
Onondaga	Syracuse	85.17	137.07	To I-81 BL	Exit 1B (BL I-81)
Onondaga	Syracuse	86.18	138.69	NY 175 west (Kennedy Street)	Eastern terminus of NY 175
Onondaga	Syracuse			NY 931L (South State Street)	Northern terminus of unsigned NY 931L
Onondaga	Syracuse	87.51	140.83	NY 92 east (Genesee Street)	Western terminus of NY 92
Onondaga	Syracuse	87.70	141.14	NY 5 (Erie Boulevard)	
Onondaga	Syracuse	87.89	141.45	NY 290 east (James Street)	Western terminus of NY 290
Onondaga	Syracuse			To I-81 BL north / I-90 Toll / New York Thruway / Willow Street	
Onondaga	Syracuse	89.01	143.25	NY 298 (Court Street)	
Onondaga	Syracuse			NY 298 Truck west (Bear Street)	Southern end of NY 298 Truck overlap
Onondaga	Syracuse	89.45	143.96	NY 370 west (Park Street)	Eastern terminus of NY 370
Onondaga	Salina			NY 298 Truck east (Factory Avenue)	Northern end of NY 298 Truck overlap
Onondaga	Salina	92.53	148.91	I-81 BL to I-90 Toll / New York Thruway – Syracuse Airport	Exit 8 (BL I-81); hamlet of Mattydale
Onondaga	Cicero	95.86	154.27	NY 481 to I-81 – Fulton, Oswego	Access via NY 930J/NY 931H; exit 1B-C (NY 481)
Onondaga	Cicero	97.27	156.54	NY 31 to I-81 – Baldwinsville, Bridgeport	
Onondaga	Cicero	101.35	163.11	Bartel Road to I-81	Hamlet of Brewerton
Oswego	Central Square	105.18	169.27	NY 49 to I-81 – Fulton, Cleveland	
Oswego	Hastings	112.21	180.58	NY 69A north – Parish	Southern terminus of NY 69A
Oswego	Town of Mexico	114.48	184.24	NY 69 to I-81 – Parish	
Oswego	Town of Mexico	117.13	188.50	NY 104 to I-81 – Mexico, Oswego, Williamstown	
Oswego	Pulaski	124.47	200.32	NY 13 (Port Street) to I-81 south – Port Ontario, Selkirk Shores State Park, Altmar	
Oswego	Pulaski	124.91	201.02	Maple Avenue to I-81 north	
Jefferson	Town of Ellisburg	133.46	214.78	I-81	Exit 134 (I-81)
Jefferson	Town of Ellisburg	137.25	220.88	NY 193 west to I-81 – Ellisburg	Eastern terminus of NY 193; hamlet of Pierrepont Manor
Jefferson	Village of Adams	142.86	229.91	NY 178 west (Church Street) to I-81	Eastern terminus of NY 178
Jefferson	Town of Adams	146.54	235.83	NY 177 to I-81 – Rodman	Hamlet of Adams Center
Jefferson	Town of Adams	148.57	239.10	To I-81 (via NY 971P)	interchange
Jefferson	Town of Watertown	152.83	245.96	NY 232 south to I-81	Northern terminus of NY 232
Jefferson	City of Watertown	156.42	251.73	NY 3 west (Arsenal Street) to NY 12F	Northbound intersection; south terminus of US 11 north / NY 3 east / NY 12 south overlap
Jefferson	City of Watertown	156.53	251.91	NY 3 east / NY 12 south (State Street) – Utica	Northbound intersection; north terminus of US 11 north / NY 3 east / NY 12 south overlap; southern terminus of US 11 north / NY 12 north overlap
Jefferson	City of Watertown			NY 283 east (Factory Street)	northbound intersection
Jefferson	City of Watertown			NY 3 / NY 12 south / US 11 Truck south (Arsenal Street) to I-81	southbound intersection; south end of US 11 south / NY 12 south overlap
Jefferson	City of Watertown			NY 12F west (Coffeen Street) to I-81 – Oswego	Southbound intersection; eastern terminus of NY 12F
Jefferson	City of Watertown	156.88	252.47	NY 12 north (Main Street)	northern terminus of US 11 / NY 12 overlap
Jefferson	Pamelia	158.48	255.05	NY 37 east – Ogdensburg	Western terminus of NY 37
Jefferson	Le Ray	162.35	261.28	NY 342 to I-81 – Black River	Hamlet of Calcium
Jefferson	Le Ray	163.79	263.59	I-781 west to I-81 / Arsenal Street – Watertown, Canada, Fort Drum Main Gate	Exit 4 (I-781); single-point urban interchange
Jefferson	Le Ray	166.79	268.42	NY 26 south – Fort Drum	Southern terminus of US 11 / NY 26 overlap
Jefferson	Village of Philadelphia	173.84	279.77	NY 26 north – Theresa	Northern terminus of US 11 / NY 26 overlap
St. Lawrence	Village of Gouverneur	191.59	308.33	NY 58 / NY 812 south (Clinton Street / William Street) – Morristown, Edwards	Southern terminus of US 11 / NY 812 overlap
St. Lawrence	De Kalb	203.02	326.73	NY 812 north – Ogdensburg	Northern terminus of US 11 / NY 812 overlap
St. Lawrence	Village of Canton	215.43	346.70	NY 68 west – Ogdensburg	south terminus of US 11 / NY 68 overlap
St. Lawrence	Village of Canton	216.82	348.94	NY 68 east / NY 310 north – Colton	north terminus of US 11 / NY 68 overlap; southern terminus of NY 310
St. Lawrence	Village of Potsdam			Maple Street ( NY 971U)	Former routing of US 11; western terminus of unsigned NY 971U
St. Lawrence	Village of Potsdam	226.09	363.86	NY 345 north	Southern terminus of NY 345
St. Lawrence	Village of Potsdam	226.64	364.74	NY 56 north – Massena	Northern terminus of US 11 / NY 56 overlap
St. Lawrence	Village of Potsdam	226.81	365.02	NY 56 south	Southern terminus of US 11 / NY 56 overlap
St. Lawrence	Village of Potsdam			Park Street ( NY 971T)	Former routing of NY 56; northern terminus of unsigned NY 971T
St. Lawrence	Village of Potsdam	227.07	365.43	NY 11B east – Nicholville	Western terminus of NY 11B
St. Lawrence	Stockholm	237.00	381.41	NY 11C north – Winthrop, Brasher Falls	south terminus of NY 11C; hamlet of Stockholm Center
St. Lawrence	Stockholm	239.75	385.84	NY 420 north – Winthrop	Southern terminus of NY 420
St. Lawrence	Lawrence	245.00	394.29	NY 11C south – North Lawrence, Brasher Falls	north terminus of NY 11C
St. Lawrence	Lawrence	246.19	396.20	CR 54 – Nicholville	Former northern terminus of NY 195; hamlet of Lawrenceville
Franklin	Moira	251.75	405.15	NY 95 north	Southern terminus of NY 95
Franklin	Village of Malone	264.61	425.85	NY 11B west / NY 30 south / NY 37 west – Massena, Tupper Lake	south terminus of US 11 / NY 30 overlap; eastern terminus of NY 11B; eastern terminus of NY 37
Franklin	Village of Malone	265.02	426.51	NY 30 north	north terminus of US 11 / NY 30 overlap
Franklin	Burke	271.98	437.71	NY 122 west – Constable	Eastern terminus of NY 122
Franklin	Village of Chateaugay	278.05	447.48	NY 374 east (Depot Street) / CR 52 north (River Street) – Huntingdon, Dannemora	Western terminus of NY 374
Clinton	Clinton	286.10	460.43	NY 189 north – Churubusco	Southern terminus of NY 189
Clinton	Ellenburg	290.79	467.98	To NY 190 (via NY 971L) – Ellenburg Center, Plattsburgh	
Clinton	Mooers			Hemmingford Road (CR 34 north) – Hemmingford, Montreal	Former NY 22
Clinton	Mooers	305.46	491.59	NY 22 south – Plattsburgh	Northern terminus of NY 22; hamlet of Mooers
Clinton	Town of Champlain	311.95	502.03	I-87 to A-15 – Montreal, Plattsburgh	Exit 42 (I-87)
Clinton	Town of Champlain	312.53	502.97	US 9 – Champlain, Plattsburgh	
Clinton	Town of Champlain	314.10	505.49	NY 276 east – Lacolle	Western terminus of NY 276
Clinton	Rouses Point	316.70	509.68	NY 9B south / Lakes to Locks Passage	Northern terminus of NY 9B
Clinton	Rouses Point	317.55	511.05	NY 276 west (Pratt Street)	Eastern terminus of NY 276
Clinton	Rouses Point	317.88	511.58	US 2 east to I-89 – Vermont	Western terminus of US 2 (eastern segment)
Clinton	Rouses Point	318.66	512.83	R-223 north / Route du Richelieu – Saint-Paul-de-l'Île-aux-Noix, Saint-Jean-sur-Richelieu	Continuation into Quebec
1.000 mi = 1.609 km; 1.000 km = 0.621 mi: Concurrency terminus; Incomplete access

== See also ==
- List of county routes in Clinton County, New York
- New York State Bicycle Route 11, a pair of state bicycle routes that follow the southernmost and northernmost sections of US 11 in New York

U.S. Route 11
Previous state: Pennsylvania	New York	Next state: Terminus
