= New York State Route 11C =

State highway in St. Lawrence County, New York, US

New York State Route 11C
- Map of northern New York with NY 11C highlighted in red

Route information
- Auxiliary route of US 11
- Maintained by NYSDOT
- Length: 11.44 mi (18.41 km)
- Existed: September 1, 1982–present

Major junctions
- West end: US 11 in Stockholm
- East end: US 11 in Lawrence

Location
- Country: United States
- State: New York
- Counties: St. Lawrence

Highway system
- New York Highways; Interstate; US; State; Reference; Parkways
← NY 11B	→ NY 12

New York State Route 11C (NY 11C) is a short state highway located in St. Lawrence County in the northern part of New York in the United States. NY 11C is a northern alternate route of U.S. Route 11 (US 11) between the towns of Stockholm and Lawrence that serves the hamlets of Winthrop and Brasher Falls. NY 11C briefly overlaps with NY 420 in Winthrop. Although NY 11C follows a mostly east–west routing, it was signed as a north–south route until the 2010s.

The current alignment of NY 11C was originally part of US 11. An alternate route of then-US 11 between Stockholm Center and Coteys Corner that bypassed the Brasher Falls area to the south was added to the state highway system on September 1, 1982, and designated as NY 11C. The alignments of US 11 and NY 11C between the two hamlets were flipped on June 13, 1992, placing both routes on their current routings.

== Route description ==
NY 11C begins at an intersection with US 11 in the hamlet of Stockholm Center within the town of Stockholm. The highway heads to the northeast, intersecting with a local road west of the Meadowbrook Golf Club. NY 11C continues on, crossing over the west branch of the St. Regis River and entering a residential area of Stockholm known as Winthrop. In the hamlet, NY 11C overlaps with NY 420 for one block. NY 420 turns off at the center of the community and heads toward Massena while NY 11C continues northeast out of Winthrop and into the town of Brasher.

NY 11C heads into Brasher Falls and follows Ford and South Church Streets through the community. At the junction of Church and Main Streets, the route turns east to follow Main Street across the St. Regis River. Once on the opposite bank, NY 11C turns south onto a riverside roadway. The highway then veers to the southeast, and eventually to the east through largely forested areas as it passes into the town of Lawrence. NY 11C follows a routing parallel to that of the Brasher–Lawrence town line to North Lawrence, where it turns south onto Nicholville–Helena Road. The route continues to Cotey Corners, where it terminates at an intersection with US 11 and County Route 55 (CR 55).

== History ==
When the first set of posted routes in New York were assigned in 1924, NY 2 was assigned to a highway extending from the Pennsylvania state line to the Canada–United States border. In northeastern St. Lawrence County, NY 2 served the hamlets of Stockholm Center, Winthrop, Brasher Falls, North Lawrence, and Cotey Corners. NY 2 was renumbered to US 11 in 1927. On September 1, 1982, ownership and maintenance of CR 110, a county road extending from Stockholm Center to Coteys Corner on a direct east–west routing, was transferred from St. Lawrence County to the state of New York as part of a highway maintenance swap between the two levels of government and the village of Canton. The new state highway was initially designated as NY 11C. On June 13, 1992, the alignments of US 11 and NY 11C between Stockholm Center and Coteys Corner were swapped, placing both routes on their modern alignments.

== Major intersections ==
The entire route is in St. Lawrence County.

Location	mi	km	Destinations	Notes
Stockholm	0.00	0.00	US 11 – Malone, Potsdam	Western terminus; hamlet of Stockholm Center
Stockholm	2.99	4.81	NY 420 south	South end of NY 420 overlap; hamlet of Winthrop
Stockholm	3.14	5.05	NY 420 north – Massena	North end of NY 420 overlap; hamlet of Winthrop
Lawrence	11.44	18.41	US 11 – Malone	Eastern terminus; hamlet of Coteys Corners
1.000 mi = 1.609 km; 1.000 km = 0.621 mi: Concurrency terminus
