= George Gilbert =

George Gilbert may refer to:

- George G. Gilbert (1849–1909), U.S. Representative from Kentucky
- George W. Gilbert (1873–1944), American businessman and politician from New York
- George Gilbert (cricketer) (1829–1906), Australian cricketer
- George Gilbert (Jesuit) (1559–1583), English Roman Catholic convert and activist
- George B. Gilbert, pastor of Emmanuel Church (Killingworth, Connecticut), author
