= Clinton, New York =

Clinton, New York may refer to:

- Clinton County, New York
- Clinton, Clinton County, New York
- Clinton, Dutchess County, New York
- Clinton, Oneida County, New York
- Clinton, Manhattan, or Hell's Kitchen, a neighborhood in New York City
- East Greenbush, New York, originally Clinton, a town in Rensselaer County, New York

== See also ==
- George Clinton (vice president) (1739–1812), first governor of New York, for whom many places in the state are named
- DeWitt Clinton (1769–1828), 47th mayor of New York City and seventh governor of New York, for whom many places in the state are named
- Hillary Clinton (born 1947), former US senator from New York
