= New York State Route 189 =

State highway in Clinton County, New York, US

New York State Route 189
- Map of Clinton County in northern New York with NY 189 highlighted in red

Route information
- Maintained by NYSDOT
- Length: 5.70 mi (9.17 km)
- Existed: 1930–present

Major junctions
- South end: US 11 in Clinton
- North end: R-209 at the Canadian border in Clinton

Location
- Country: United States
- State: New York
- Counties: Clinton

Highway system
- New York Highways; Interstate; US; State; Reference; Parkways
← NY 187	→ I-190

New York State Route 189 (NY 189) is a north–south state highway located near the northern border of New York in the United States. It extends for 5.70 miles (9.17 km) through the Clinton County town of Clinton from a junction with U.S. Route 11 (US 11) to the Canada–US border, where it continues into Quebec as Route 209. In between, the two-lane NY 189 serves the small hamlet of Churubusco. Outside of Churubusco, the highway passes through rural, undeveloped areas. NY 189 was assigned to its current alignment as part of the 1930 renumbering of state highways in New York and has remained untouched since.

== Route description ==
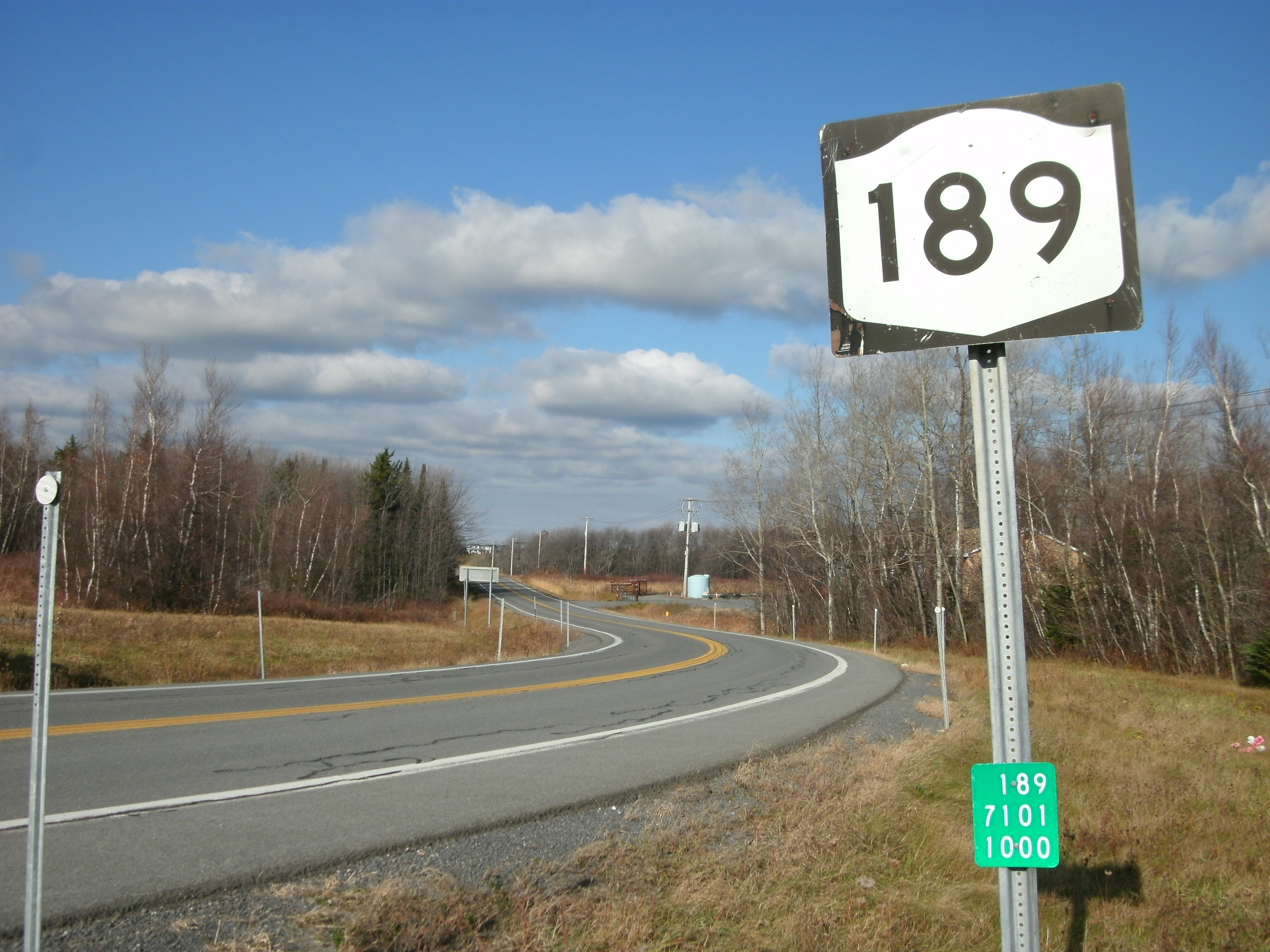
First reassurance and reference markers on NY 189 northbound

NY 189 starts at an intersection with US 11 in the town of Clinton. The route progresses northward as a two-lane highway, passing a lone farm just after US 11. Over the next 1.5 miles (2.4 km), NY 189 passes through highly isolated areas of Clinton County dominated by patches of forests interspersed with small clearings. After Lagree Road and Swamp Road, two local roads maintained by the town of Clinton, the route passes by a small handful of residences on its way into the hamlet of Churubusco, the only community along NY 189. Here, it intersects with County Route 8 (CR 8), named Looby Road west of NY 189 and Clinton Mills Road east of the highway. The route continues north through the western portion of the small community, passing by the former site of NY 189's U.S. Customs and Border Protection station, once located in what is now a clearing south of Broad Street.

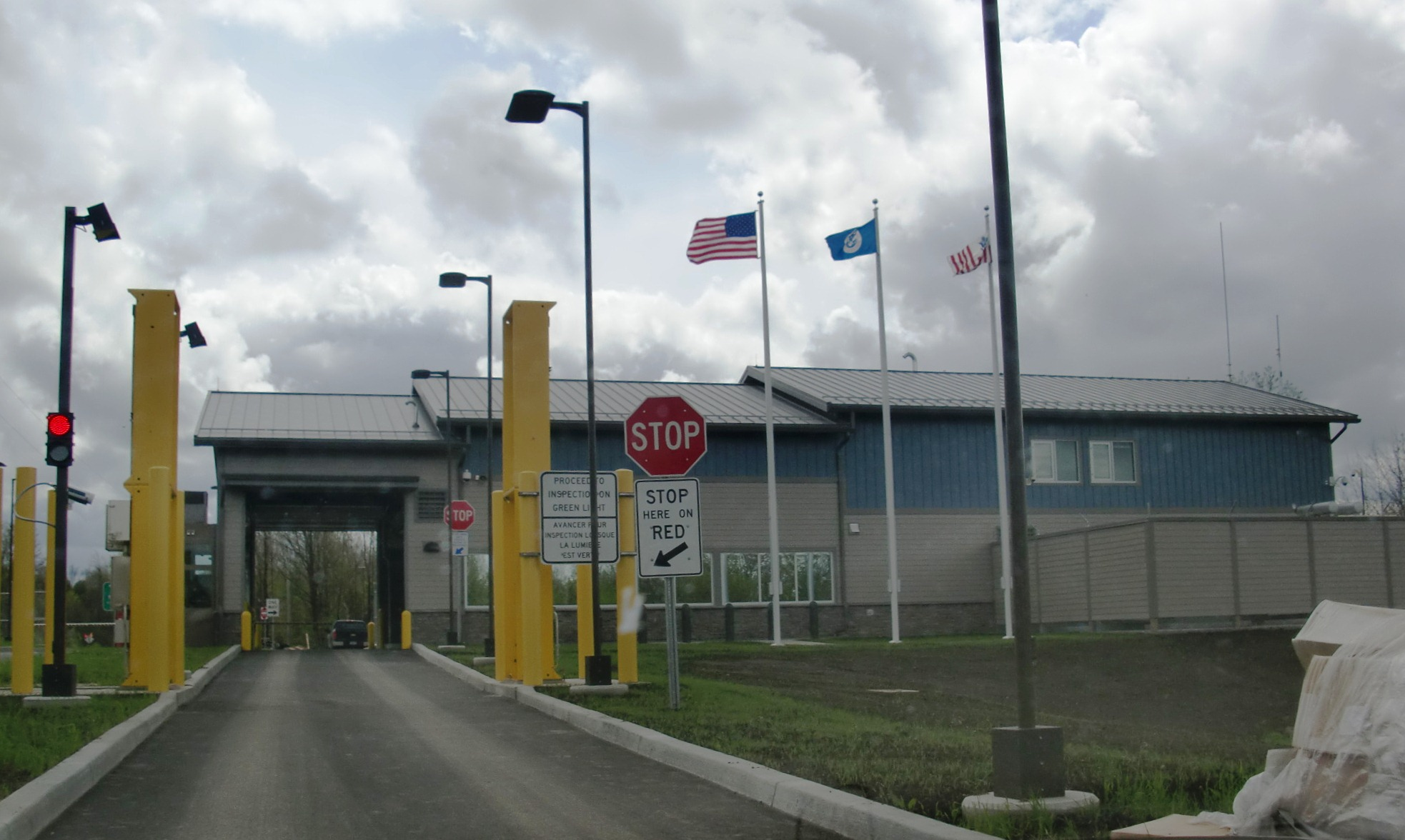
The United States Customs station at the northern terminus of NY 189

The route's second and last intersection in Churubusco is with Broad Street, which links NY 189 to the more populated eastern half of the hamlet. North of Churubusco, NY 189 passes through more forests and fields and serves only a small amount of isolated residences and farms. As it heads toward the Canada–US border, it crosses roads of mostly local importance, beginning with Merchia Road just north of Churubusco and concluding with CR 9 (Frontier Road) and Liberty Pole Road at a junction less than 1 mile (1.6 km) from the border. NY 189 continues north to the border, where it ends upon passing the Churubusco–Franklin Centre Border Crossing. Past the station, the highway continues north into the Canadian province of Quebec as Route 209.

== History ==
What is now NY 189 was originally taken over by the state of New York in the late 1920s. Work to improve the highway to state highway standards began around this time and was completed c. 1930. In the 1930 renumbering of state highways in New York, several of the routes assigned during the 1920s were renumbered or modified. At the same time, hundreds of state-maintained highways that did not yet have a route number were assigned one. One of these was the north–south highway connecting US 11 to the Canada–US border via Churubusco, which was designated as NY 189. The route has not been altered since that time.

== Major intersections ==
The entire route is in Clinton, Clinton County.

mi	km	Destinations	Notes
0.00	0.00	US 11 – Mooers, Malone	Southern terminus
5.70	9.17	Churubusco–Franklin Centre Border Crossing	No northbound access from the U.S. to Canada
5.70	9.17	R-209 north – Franklin	Continuation into Quebec
1.000 mi = 1.609 km; 1.000 km = 0.621 mi: Incomplete access

== See also ==
- List of county routes in Jefferson County, New York
