= West Stockholm Historic District =

Historic district in New York, United States

- U.S. National Register of Historic Places
- U.S. Historic district
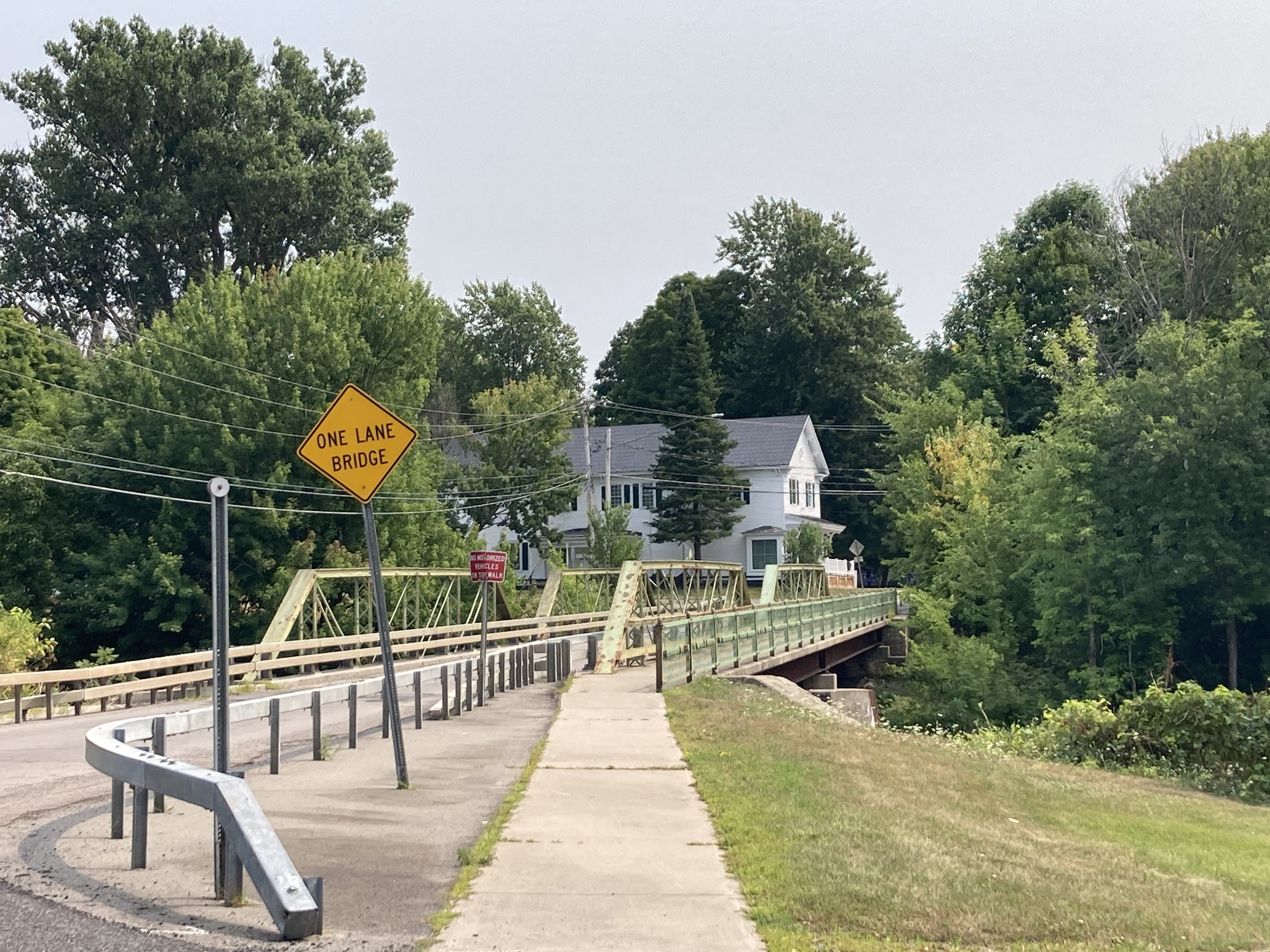
- A bridge crosses the St. Regis River in the West Stockholm Historic District.

- Location within New York Location within the United States
- Location: W. Stockholm and Livingston Rds., Stockholm, New York
- Coordinates: 44°42′44″N 74°54′8″W
- Area: 30 acres (12 ha)
- Built: 1815
- Architect: Multiple
- Architectural style: Greek Revival, Italianate, Federal
- NRHP reference No.: 79003172
- Added to NRHP: November 20, 1979

West Stockholm Historic District is a national historic district located in Stockholm, New York. The district includes 27 contributing buildings and three contributing sites. The district encompasses the archaeological sites of mills and small factories as well as the cluster of extant residences, shops, and public buildings which comprises the village center. The buildings were built between 1815 and about 1900.

It was listed on the National Register of Historic Places in 1979.
