= New York State Route 420 =

State highway in St. Lawrence County, New York, US

New York State Route 420
- Map of northeastern St. Lawrence County with NY 420 highlighted in red and NY 970B in blue

Route information
- Maintained by NYSDOT
- Length: 11.92 mi (19.18 km)
- Existed: 1930–present

Major junctions
- South end: US 11 in Stockholm
- North end: NY 37 in Massena

Location
- Country: United States
- State: New York
- Counties: St. Lawrence

Highway system
- New York Highways; Interstate; US; State; Reference; Parkways
← NY 419	→ NY 421

New York State Route 420 (NY 420) is a north–south state highway in St. Lawrence County, New York, in the United States. The southern terminus of the route is at an intersection with U.S. Route 11 (US 11) in the town of Stockholm. Its northern terminus is at a junction with NY 37 in the village of Massena. NY 420 passes through undeveloped regions of St. Lawrence County for most of its routing and briefly overlaps with NY 11C in the hamlet of Winthrop.

NY 420 was originally part of Route 32, an unsigned legislative route created by the New York State Legislature in 1908. The Winthrop–Massena portion of Route 32 became part of the signed NY 56 in the mid-1920s; however, NY 56 was realigned in 1927 to follow a new alignment well to the south of Winthrop. The former routing of NY 56 between Winthrop and Massena was redesignated as NY 420 as part of the 1930 renumbering of state highways in New York. NY 420 was extended southward to its current terminus south of Winthrop in 1980.

== Route description ==
NY 420 begins at an intersection with US 11 in the town of Stockholm. The route heads north as a two-lane highway through forested areas and across both branches of the St. Regis River to the hamlet of Winthrop, the first area of significant development along the highway. Here, the two branches of the St. Regis River converge and NY 420 meets NY 11C. NY 420 turns northeastward, overlapping NY 11C for two blocks before splitting from it in the center of Winthrop.

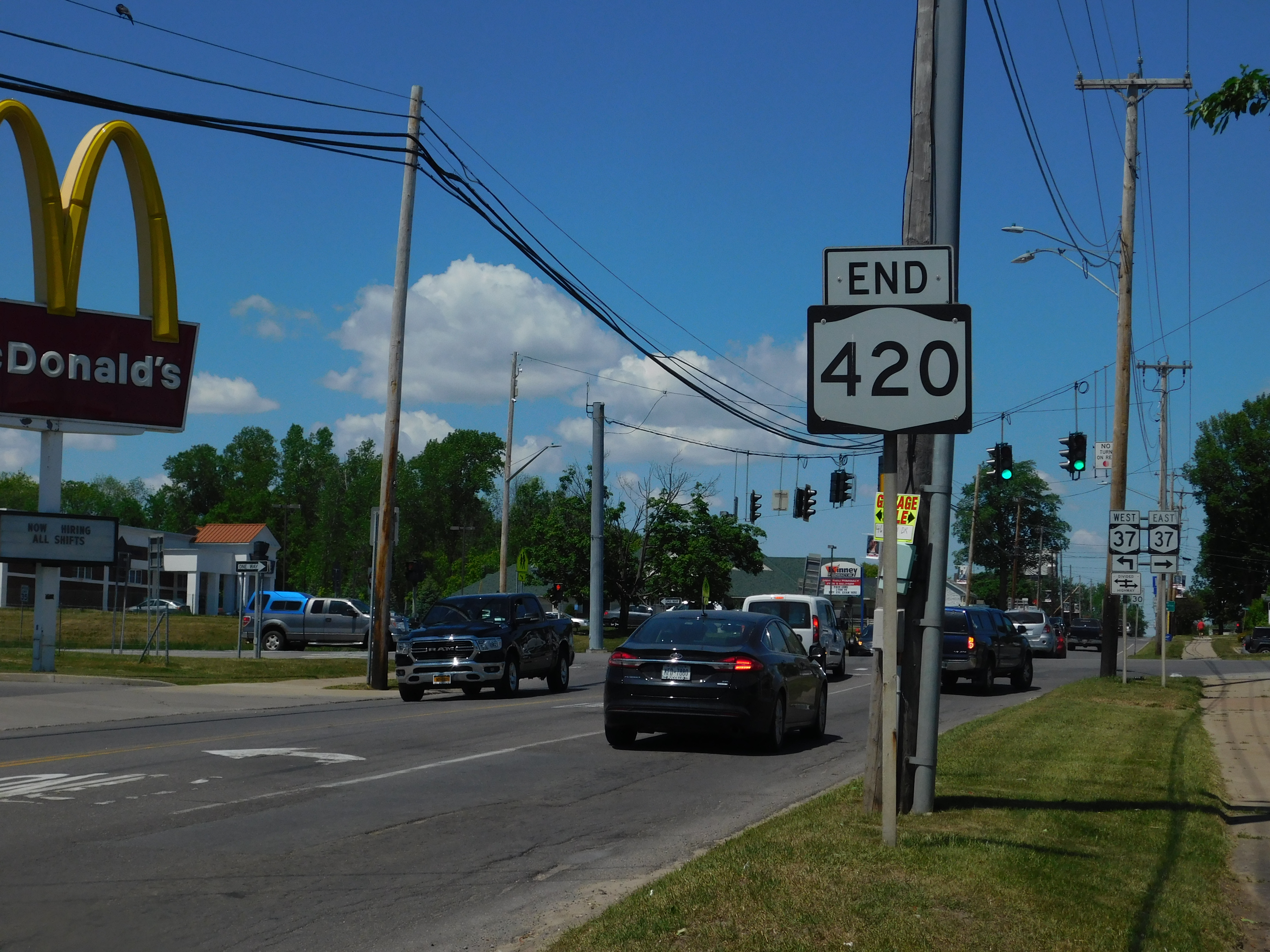
NY 420 approaching NY 37 in Massena

The route heads northwest from Winthrop, passing through heavily forested areas of St. Lawrence County. As NY 420 passes out of Stockholm and into Norfolk, the forests surrounding the highway begin to taper off and give way to small pockets of residences and cultivated fields. The number of homes along the route begin to increase upon intersecting Plum Brook Road, at which point NY 420 becomes lined with residences for much of its run through north Norfolk. However, the string of homes ends near the northern town line, and the highway becomes flanked by forests once more as it curves northward and enters the town of Massena.

In Massena, the forests along NY 420 subside slightly as it passes by industrial warehouses and residences. The route curves back to the northwest as it enters the village of Massena. Just past the village line, NY 420 crosses the St. Lawrence Subdivision, a railroad line owned by CSX Transportation. The highway continues on, curving northward to cross the Raquette River. It curves back to the northwest on the northern riverbank and passes by a mixture of homes and commercial establishments before intersecting NY 37 south of the village center. NY 420 ends here; however, the road continues north into the heart of the village as Main Street.

== History ==
In 1908, the New York State Legislature created Route 32, an unsigned legislative route extending from North Lawrence to Ogdensburg via Winthrop and Massena. When the first set of posted routes in New York were assigned in 1924, all of Route 32 west of Massena became part of NY 3 while the section east of Winthrop was incorporated into NY 2. The Winthrop–Massena segment of Route 32 did not initially receive a designation; however, by 1926, it had become the northwesternmost portion of NY 56, a highway linking Brighton to Massena via Nicholville and Winthrop. In 1927, NY 56 was realigned to proceed west from Nicholville on modern NY 11B to a new terminus in the village of Potsdam. The former routing of NY 56 between Winthrop and Massena was left unnumbered until the 1930 renumbering of state highways in New York when it was designated as NY 420.

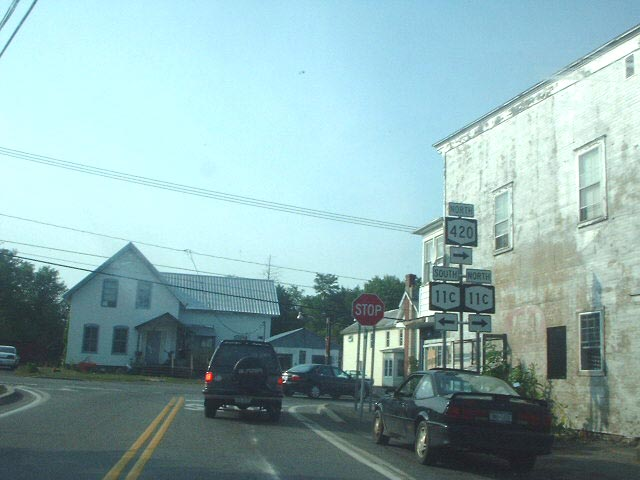
Western terminus of NY 420's overlap with NY 11C

The initial northern terminus of NY 420 was in the center of Massena at the junction of Orvis and Main Streets, where it ended at NY 37. In the mid-1950s, construction began on a new alignment for NY 37 around the southern edge of the village. The highway opened to traffic by 1958; however, NY 420 continued to extend past the bypass into Massena until the early 1960s, when it was cut back to its junction with NY 37's new routing. The former routing of NY 420 in Massena is still state-maintained as part of NY 970B, an unsigned reference route designation for all of Main Street between NY 37 and NY 37B.

On September 1, 1982, ownership and maintenance of County Route 51 (CR 51) from CR 110 north to US 11 in Winthrop was transferred from St. Lawrence County to the state of New York as part of a highway maintenance swap between the two levels of government. Also transferred to the state as part of the swap was CR 110 itself, an east–west highway extending from Stockholm Center to Coteys Corner. The segment of CR 51 given to New York became a southward extension of NY 420, which now began at NY 11C (former CR 110) and briefly overlapped US 11 in Winthrop. The alignments of US 11 and NY 11C between Stockholm Center and Coteys Corner were flipped on June 13, 1992.

== Major intersections ==
The entire route is in St. Lawrence County.

Location	mi	km	Destinations	Notes
Stockholm	0.00	0.00	US 11 – Malone, Lawrenceville, Potsdam	Southern terminus
Stockholm	1.33	2.14	NY 11C west – Potsdam	Hamlet of Winthrop; western terminus of NY 11C / NY 420 overlap
Stockholm	1.48	2.38	NY 11C east – Malone	Hamlet of Winthrop; eastern terminus of NY 11C / NY 420 overlap
Village of Massena	11.92	19.18	NY 37 – Ogdensburg, Malone	Northern terminus
Village of Massena	11.92	19.18	North Main Street (NY 970B)	Continuation past NY 37
1.000 mi = 1.609 km; 1.000 km = 0.621 mi: Concurrency terminus
