= Churubusco–Franklin Centre Border Crossing =

Canada–United States border crossing

Churubusco-Franklin Centre Border Crossing
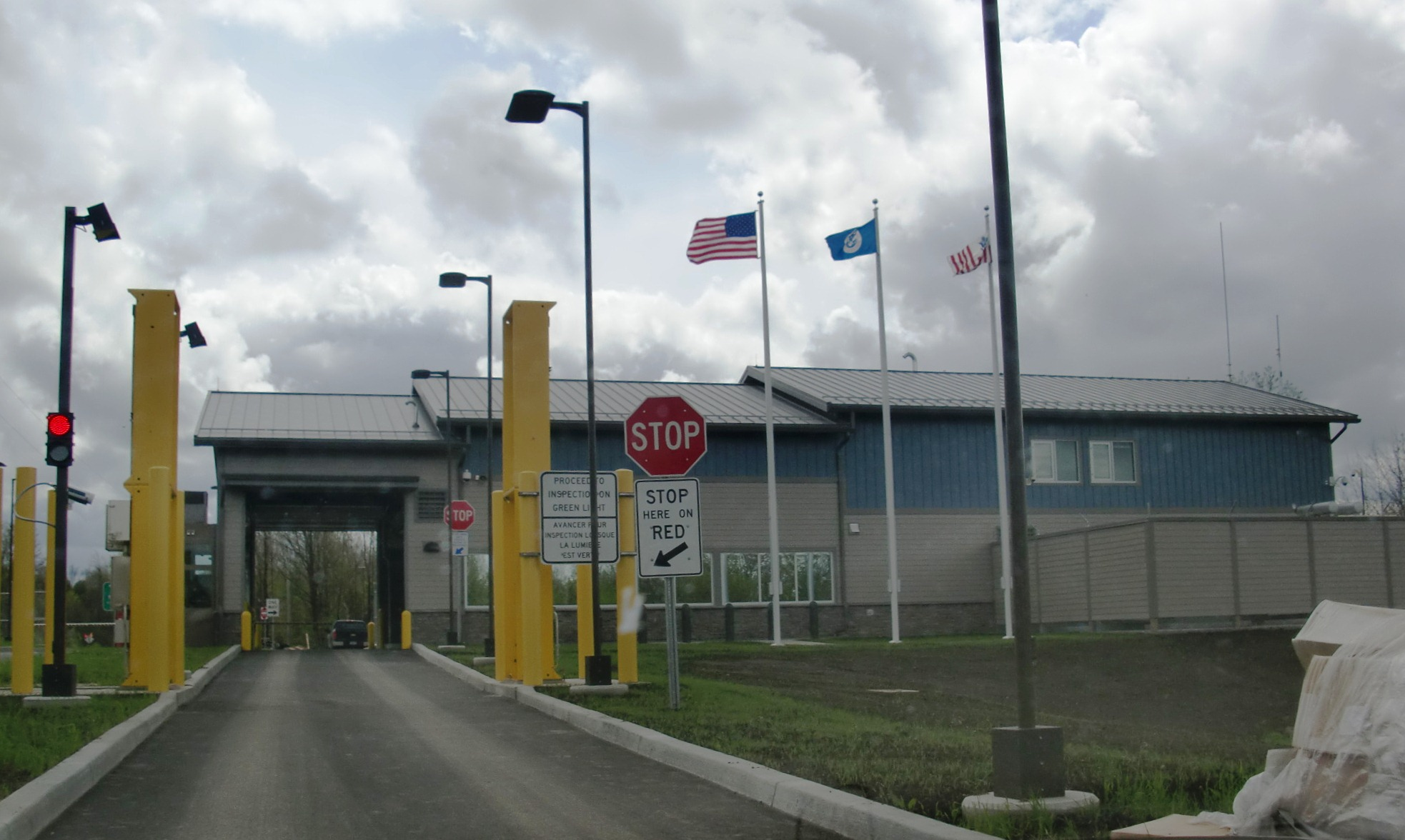
- Churubusco, NY Border Inspection Station

Location
- Country: United States; Canada
- Location: R-209 south to NY 189 south; No northbound access from the US to Canada; US Port: NY Route 189 Churubusco, New York 12923; Canadian Port: None
- Coordinates: 44.998978°N 73.939211°W

Details
- Opened: 1933

Website
- https://www.cbp.gov/contact/ports/trout-river-new-york-0715

Churubusco-Franklin Centre is a border crossing connecting Franklin, Quebec to Churubusco, New York on the Canada–US border. Due to an unusual lack of coordination between the two nations, the U.S. committed to building a new $6.8 million border inspection station at Churubusco at the same time Canada committed to closing its Franklin Centre border station. Currently, travelers may enter the US from Canada via southbound Quebec Route 209 at this location, but they must return via another route instead of taking northbound New York State Route 189. This is the only US-entry-only border crossing with Canada.

Canada closed its port of entry on April 1, 2011, and tore down its border inspection station soon thereafter. The US completed work on its new border inspection station and tore down its old border station in 2012.

Prior to 1968, the US had no border inspection station at this crossing. The US Customs Service operated an office in rented space in a small duplex storefront near Ellenburg, New York and people entering the US at this location were expected to travel there to report for inspection.

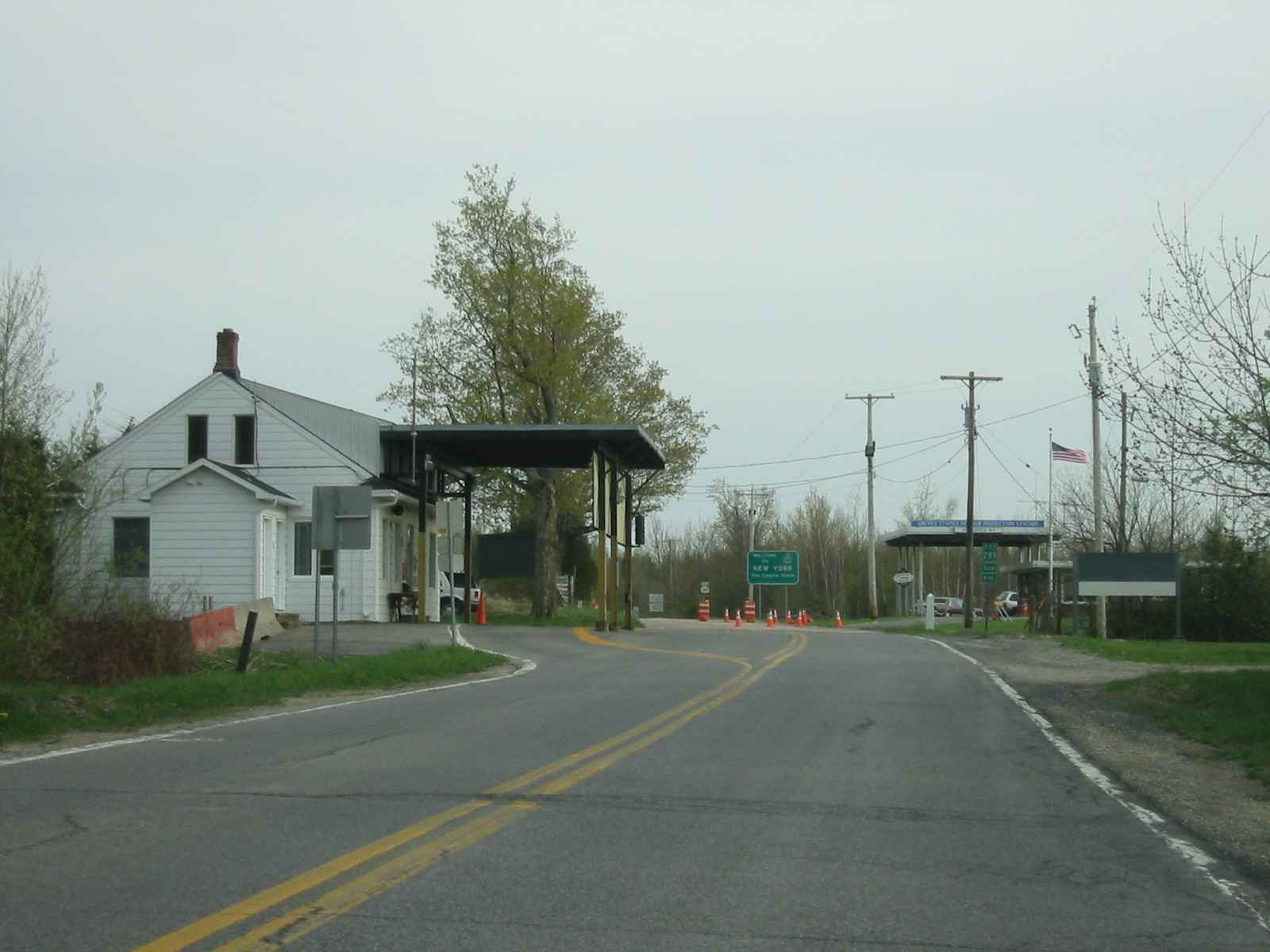
Canada Border Inspection Station at Franklin, Quebec as seen in 2001. This building was closed and subsequently demolished in 2011.

== See also ==
- List of Canada–United States border crossings
- Four Falls Border Crossing, formerly the only U.S.-to-Canada-only border crossing
