= George W. Gilbert =

American businessman and politician (1873–1944)

Member of the New York State Assembly
- In office January 1, 1923 – December 31, 1925
- Preceded by: Charles M. Harrington
- Succeeded by: Ezra Trepanier

Personal details
- Born: February 8, 1873 Ellenburg Center, New York, U.S.
- Died: January 4, 1944 (aged 70) Plattsburgh, New York, U.S.
- Resting place: Ellenburg Center Riverside Cemetery, Ellenburg Center, New York, U.S.
- Party: Republican
- Spouse: Jennie Sanborn (m. 1909)
- Children: 1
- Occupation: Politician, businessman

George W. Gilbert (February 8, 1873 – January 4, 1944) was an American businessman and politician from New York.

== Life ==
Gilbert was born on February 8, 1873, in Ellenburg Center, New York.

After attending the village school, Gilbert initially taught in the district school and worked as a clerk in the country store. He then worked as a bookkeeper for John Haughran's general store and creameries. He then entered the mercantile business in Ellenburg Center with William H. Gordon under the firm name Gordon & Gilbert. He later worked with George O'Connor under the firm name Gilbert & O'Connor. He sold his interest in the business to William E. Patnode in 1914. In 1916, he bought the hardware and farm implement business The Cheeseman-Munsil Company at Ellenburg Depot. He ran the business until 1938, when he sold it to Ralph L. Robie. He was also an organizer of the State Bank of Ellenburg in 1920, serving as a director and vice-president of the bank from its organization until his death.

Gilbert served as both town clerk and town supervisor of Ellenburg for several years. In 1922, he was elected to the New York State Assembly as a Republican, representing Clinton County. He served in the Assembly in 1923, 1924, and 1925.

In 1909, Gilbert married Jennie Sanborn. They had a daughter, Mrs. W. Scott Perkins.

Gilbert died in the Physician's Hospital in Plattsburgh on January 4, 1944. He was buried in Ellenburg Center Riverside Cemetery.

New York State Assembly
Preceded by Charles M. Harrington	New York State Assembly; Clinton County; 1923–1925	Succeeded by Ezra Trepanier
