= Socrates N. Sherman =

Union Army officer, politician, surgeon

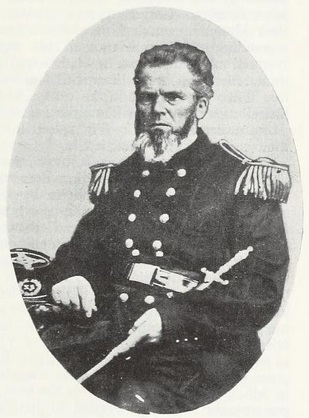
Socrates N. Sherman, Member of Congress from New York, as Assistant Surgeon of the 34th New York Infantry Regiment.

Socrates Norton Sherman (July 22, 1801 – February 1, 1873) was a U.S. representative from New York, a medical doctor, and an officer in the Union Army during the American Civil War.

== Biography ==
Born in Barre, Vermont, Sherman attended the local grade schools and high school. He studied medicine and graduated from Castleton Medical College in 1824. He subsequently moved to Ogdensburg, New York, in 1825, and opened a medical practice.

Sherman was elected as a Republican to the Thirty-seventh Congress (He served from March 4, 1861 until March 3, 1863). He declined to be a candidate for renomination in the elections of 1862. During the latter half of the Civil War, Sherman mustered into the military service as a major and the surgeon of the Thirty-fourth Regiment, New York Volunteer Infantry. He mustered out on October 7, 1865, with the brevet rank of lieutenant colonel in the U.S. Volunteers.

After the war, Sherman resumed the practice of medicine in Ogdensburg, where he died on February 1, 1873.

== Notes ==
U.S. House of Representatives
Preceded by Francis E. Spinner	Member of the U.S. House of Representatives from New York's 17th congressional district 1861 - 1863	Succeeded by Calvin T. Hulburd
