= Brewerton, New York =

- Census-designated place
- Location in Onondaga County and the state of New York.
- Coordinates: 43°14′15″N 76°8′22″W
- Country: United States
- State: New York
- Counties: Onondaga, Oswego

Area
  - Total: 3.34 sq mi (8.64 km^{2})
  - Land: 3.17 sq mi (8.20 km^{2})
  - Water: 0.17 sq mi (0.44 km^{2})
- Elevation: 384 ft (117 m)

Population (2020)
  - Total: 3,907
  - Density: 1,234.2/sq mi (476.51/km^{2})
- Time zone: UTC-5 (Eastern (EST))
  - Summer (DST): UTC-4 (EDT)
- ZIP code: 13029
- Area code: 315
- FIPS code: 36-08059
- GNIS feature ID: 0944698

Brewerton is a census-designated place (CDP) in the town of Cicero in Onondaga County and the town of Hastings in Oswego County in the U.S. state of New York and a northern suburb of the city of Syracuse. It lies at the west end of Oneida Lake at its outlet into the Oneida River. The population was 4,549 at the 2020 census. Maps of the 19th century indicate that this area was once known as Fort Brewerton, while Brewerton meant the Cicero portion.

== History ==
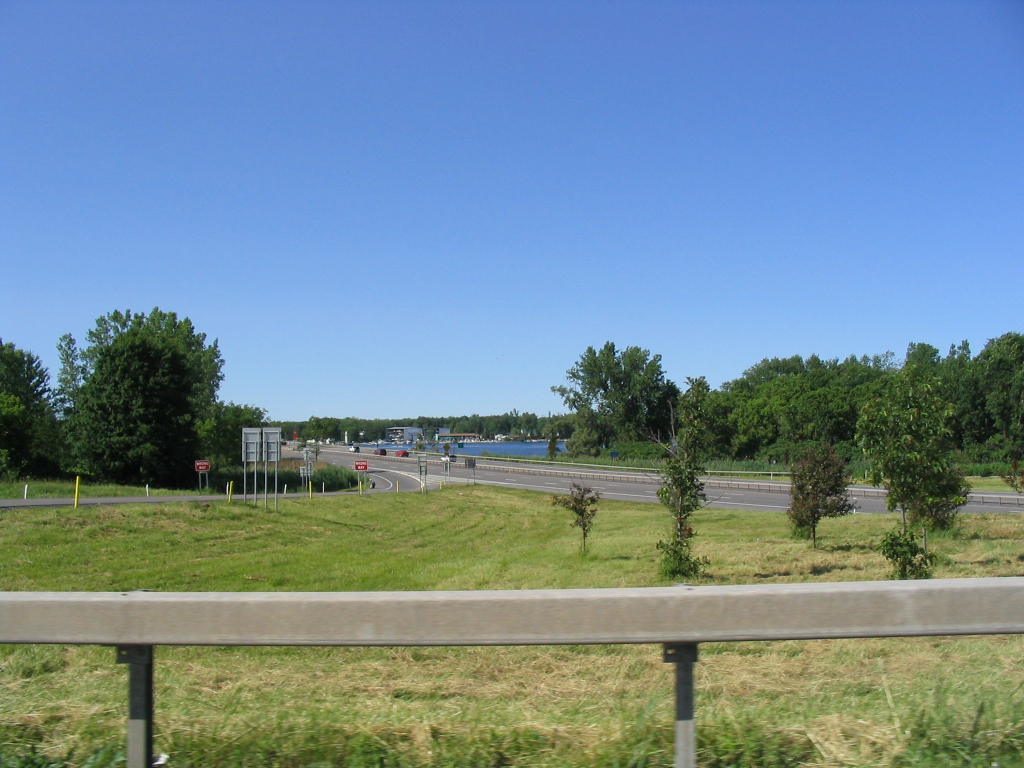
Interstate 81 cutting through Brewerton near Oneida Lake

The community is sited near the former Fort Brewerton, erected in 1759 to defend the passage from Albany to the port of Oswego. Settlers arrived in 1789 to engage in the fur trade. The Fort Brewerton Block House Museum contains local relics dating back to Paleo-Indian times. It is located next to the original fort.

In the late 18th century two Presbyterians, Rev. John Shepard and Deacon George Ramsey started preaching in the area near the Fort Brewerton embankment. Deacon Ramsey built a schoolhouse nearby which was used for both instruction and worship.

In 1948 the Brewerton Speedway was built by Alvin Richardson of Buffalo as a 1/4 mile dirt track. Brewerton was working on another track however production has stopped due to state funding.

Fort Brewerton was listed on the National Register of Historic Places in 1973.

== Geography ==
Brewerton is located at 43°14′15″N 76°8′22″W (43.237428, -76.139369) on the Oneida River on the west end of Oneida Lake.

According to the United States Census Bureau, the CDP has a total area of 3.3 square miles (8.6 km^{2}), of which 3.2 square miles (8.2 km^{2}) is land and 0.2 square mile (0.4 km^{2}) (5.11%) is water.

Brewerton has the largest elementary school in the Central Square School District, which is the geographically one of the largest school districts in the State of New York.

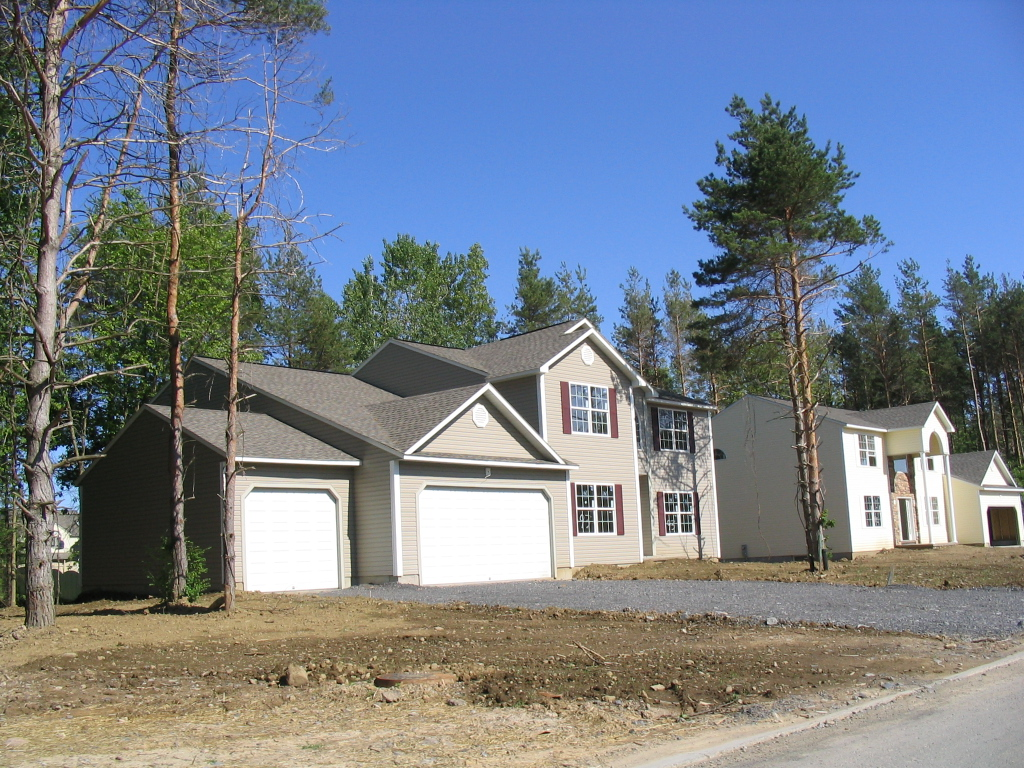
Champlain at the Lake housing development in Brewerton

Both U.S. Route 11 and Interstate 81 pass through the hamlet, connecting it to Watertown to the north and Syracuse to the south. In April 2007, the Town of Cicero redrew the traditional boundaries of Brewerton, moving the eastern line west to Interstate 81, and the southern line northward from Mudmill Road to Orangeport Road. This was done to allow Brewerton to remain eligible for Federal grant money. New housing developments had made Brewerton exceed guidelines for "blighted" areas that allow for improvement funds.

In recent years, Brewerton has become a major port for fishing on the already popular Oneida Lake. This is due to the recent Bass Masters outings at Oneida Shores County Park.

Brewerton is now a center in the growth of housing developments Miralago and Champlain at the lake.

== Demographics ==
Historical population
Census	Pop.	Note	%±
2020	3,907		—
U.S. Decennial Census

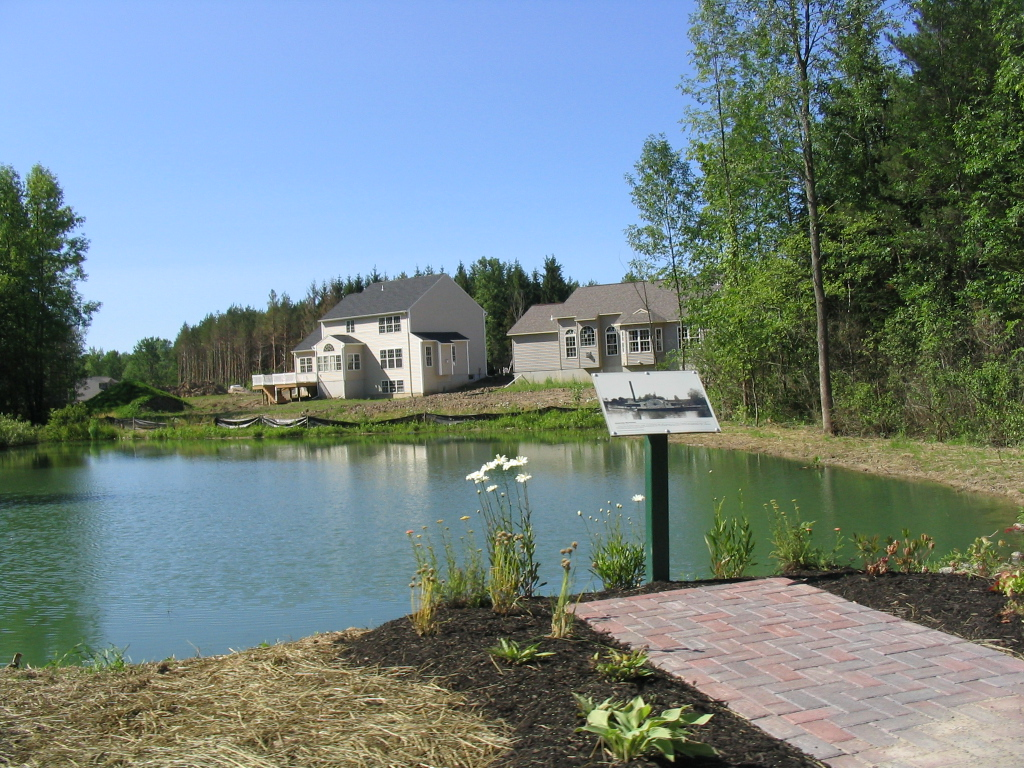
A neighborhood in Brewerton

=== 2020 census ===
As of the 2020 census, Brewerton had a population of 3,907. The median age was 43.1 years. 20.9% of residents were under the age of 18 and 17.0% of residents were 65 years of age or older. For every 100 females there were 96.9 males, and for every 100 females age 18 and over there were 96.9 males age 18 and over.

97.9% of residents lived in urban areas, while 2.1% lived in rural areas.

There were 1,726 households in Brewerton, of which 28.7% had children under the age of 18 living in them. Of all households, 41.3% were married-couple households, 21.3% were households with a male householder and no spouse or partner present, and 27.8% were households with a female householder and no spouse or partner present. About 28.9% of all households were made up of individuals and 11.7% had someone living alone who was 65 years of age or older.

There were 1,839 housing units, of which 6.1% were vacant. The homeowner vacancy rate was 0.4% and the rental vacancy rate was 4.4%.

Racial composition as of the 2020 census
Race	Number	Percent
White	3,507	89.8%
Black or African American	46	1.2%
American Indian and Alaska Native	8	0.2%
Asian	47	1.2%
Native Hawaiian and Other Pacific Islander	0	0.0%
Some other race	38	1.0%
Two or more races	261	6.7%
Hispanic or Latino (of any race)	123	3.1%

=== 2010 census ===
As of the 2010 census, there were 4,029 people, 1,644 households, and 1,033 families residing in the CDP. The population density was 1,429 inhabitants per square mile (552/km^{2}). The racial makeup of the CDP was 95.30% White, 1.3% African American, 0.60% Native American, 0.80% Asian, 0.20% from other races, and 1.8% from two or more races. Hispanic or Latino of any race were 1.50% of the population.

There were 1,644 households, out of which 37.6% had children under the age of 18 living with them, 46.8% were married couples living together, 5.2% had a male householder with no wife present, 13.9% had a female householder with no husband present, and 34.1% were non-families. 26.0% of all households were made up of individuals. The average household size was 2.45 and the average family size was 2.96.

In the CDP, the population was spread out, with 28.1% under the age of 19, 12.4% from 20 to 29, 14.1% from 30 to 39, 19.9% from 40 to 49, 17.7% from 50 to 64, and 10.8% who were 65 years of age or older. The median age for males was 36.5 years, and for females the median age was 37.3 years.

=== Income and poverty ===
From 2010 to 2014 the median income for a household in the CDP was $56,143, and the median income for a family was $69,038. Male workers had a median income of $39,943 versus $27,632 for female workers. The per capita income for the CDP was $25,318. About 11.98% of families and 16.62% of the population were below the poverty line.

== Education ==
It is within the Central Square Central School District.
