= Dr. Buck–Stevens House =

Historic house in New York, United States

- U.S. National Register of Historic Places
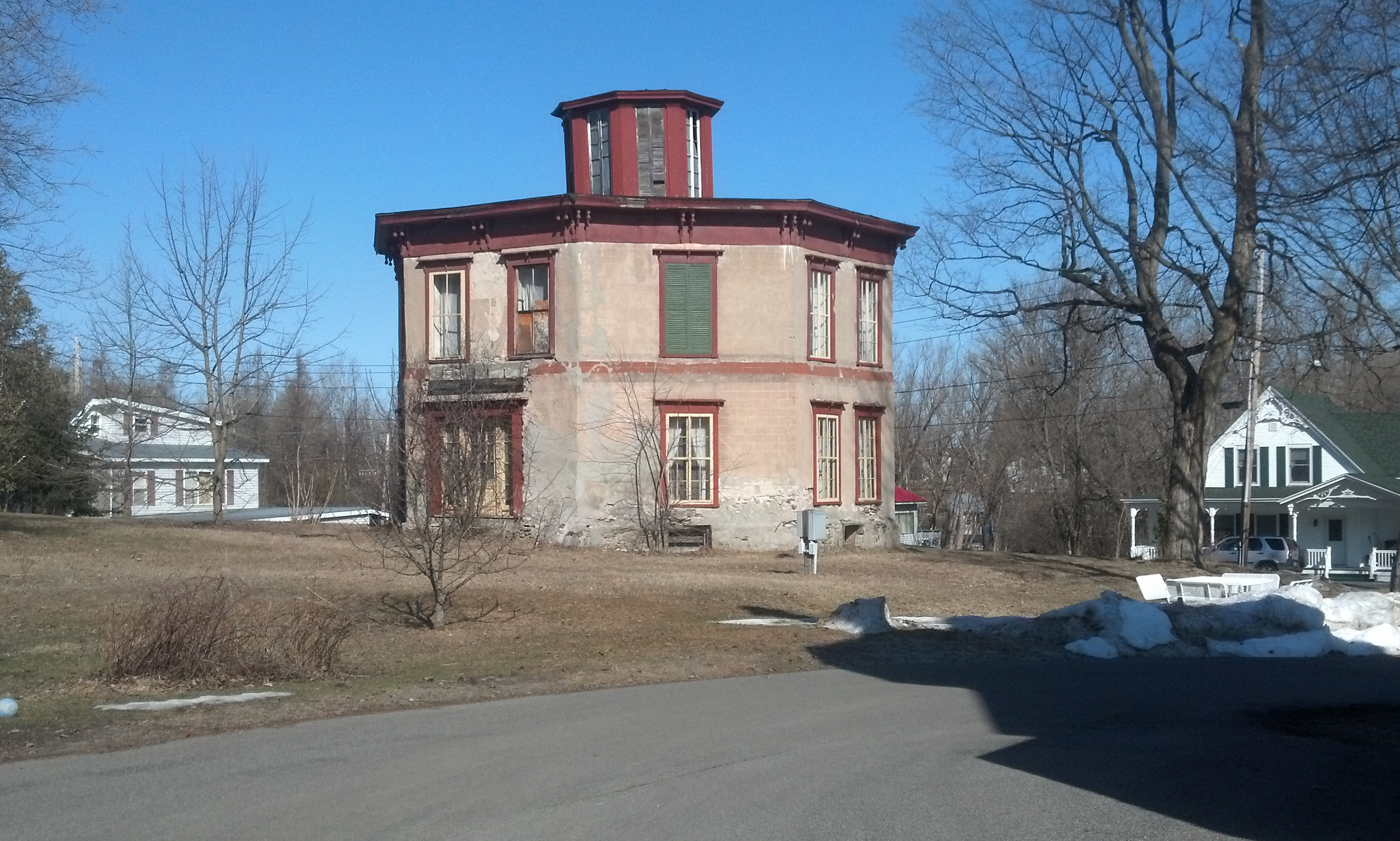
- Dr. Buck–Stevens House, May 2013

- Location within New York Location within the United States
- Location: W. Main St., Brasher Falls, New York
- Coordinates: 44°48′27″N 74°46′32″W
- Area: 0.3 acres (0.12 ha)
- Built: 1855-1857
- Architectural style: Italianate: Octagon Mode
- NRHP reference No.: 82004745
- Added to NRHP: May 17, 1982

The Dr. Buck–Stevens House, also known as the Octagon House, is an historic octagonal house located on West Main Street in Brasher Falls, in the town of Brasher, St. Lawrence County, New York. It was built between 1855 and 1857 by Dr. Nathan Buck and his wife Elmira, who lived in it until 1867; John Stevens was one of many later owners. It is a two-story residence on a raised basement. It is constructed of stuccoed concrete rusticated to resemble cut stone masonry. It has a two-story portico and is topped by a cupola.

It was listed on the National Register of Historic Places in 1982.
