= Brasher Falls, New York =

- Census-designated place
- Location within New York Location within the United States
- Coordinates: 44°48′27″N 74°46′27″W
- Country: United States
- State: New York
- County: St. Lawrence
- Town: Brasher

Area
  - Total: 1.75 sq mi (4.52 km^{2})
  - Land: 1.64 sq mi (4.25 km^{2})
  - Water: 0.10 sq mi (0.26 km^{2})
- Elevation: 290 ft (88 m)

Population (2020)
  - Total: 674
  - Density: 410.3/sq mi (158.43/km^{2})
- Time zone: UTC-5 (Eastern (EST))
  - Summer (DST): UTC-4 (EDT)
- ZIP Code: 13613
- Area codes: 315/680
- FIPS code: 36-07960
- GNIS feature ID: 2584244

Brasher Falls is the largest hamlet and a census-designated place (CDP) in the town of Brasher in St. Lawrence County, New York, United States. As of the 2020 census, Brasher Falls had a population of 674.

The community is in northeastern St. Lawrence County, in the southwestern corner of the town of Brasher. It is bordered to the west by Winthrop in the town of Stockholm, and to the south by the town of Lawrence. It sits on both sides of the St. Regis River, which drops 25 feet (7.6 m) in elevation through the hamlet, on its way north to join the St. Lawrence River in Quebec, Canada.

New York State Route 11C runs through Brasher Falls, leading southwest through Winthrop 4 miles (6 km) to U.S. Route 11 in Stockholm Center, and 7 miles (11 km) east and south to rejoin Route 11 at Coteys Corner in Lawrence. Massena is 11 miles (18 km) to the north, Malone is 33 miles (53 km) to the east, and Potsdam is 14 miles (23 km) to the southwest.

The Dr. Buck–Stevens House, an octagon house listed on the National Register of Historic Places, is on West Main Street in the hamlet.

== Demographics ==
Historical population
Census	Pop.	Note	%±
2020	674		—
U.S. Decennial Census

== Education ==
The school district is Brasher Falls Central School District.

== See also ==
- Brasher Falls–Winthrop, New York
