= Churubusco, New York =

Hamlet in New York, United States

Coordinates: 44.953866°N 73.93198°W

Churubusco is a hamlet in the Town of Clinton, in Clinton County, New York, United States.

The community is located on New York State Route 189, north of U.S. Route 11. The Churubusco–Franklin Centre Border Crossing connects New York and Quebec.

The community was named in honor of the U.S. troops who fought in the Battle of Churubusco campaign during the Mexican–American War.

The area ZIP code is 12923.
