= Blodgett Mills, New York =

- Census-designated place
- Location within New York Location within the United States
- Coordinates: 42°34′5″N 76°7′26″W
- Country: United States
- State: New York
- County: Cortland
- Town: Cortlandville

Area
  - Total: 2.17 sq mi (5.63 km^{2})
  - Land: 2.17 sq mi (5.63 km^{2})
  - Water: 0 sq mi (0.00 km^{2})
- Elevation: 1,085 ft (331 m)

Population (2020)
  - Total: 274
  - Density: 126.0/sq mi (48.66/km^{2})
- Time zone: UTC-5 (Eastern (EST))
  - Summer (DST): UTC-4 (EDT)
- ZIP Codes: 13738 (Blodgett Mills); 13045 (Cortland)
- FIPS code: 36-06937

Blodgett Mills is a hamlet and census-designated place (CDP) in Cortland County, New York, United States. As of the 2020 census, Blodgett Mills had a population of 274. It is in the town of Cortlandville, southeast of the city of Cortland.

== Geography ==
Blodgett Mills is located in the southeastern part of Cortlandville and is bordered to the south by the town of Virgil. The Tioughnioga River forms the eastern edge of the CDP and flows south to the Chenango River and ultimately to the Susquehanna River.

U.S. Route 11 passes just east of the community and is accessed by a bridge over the Tioughnioga. US-11 leads northwest 4 miles (6 km) to the center of Cortland and south 10 miles (16 km) to Marathon. Interstate 81 runs just east of US-11 but is not directly accessible from Blodgett Mills.

According to the United States Census Bureau, the Blodgett Mills CDP has a total area of 2.2 square miles (5.6 km^{2}), all land.

== Demographics ==
Historical population
Census	Pop.	Note	%±
2020	274		—
U.S. Decennial Census
