= Clinton, Clinton County, New York =

Clinton, New York
- Town
- Location in Clinton County and the state of New York.
- Coordinates: 44°56′35″N 73°56′51″W
- Country: United States
- State: New York
- County: Clinton

Government
  - Type: Town Council
  - Town Supervisor: Daniel L. LaClair (D)
  - Town Council: Members' List: • Calvin T. Sears (R); • Robert J. Rushford (R); • Lawrence Lagree (R); • Jane E. Campbell-Nichols (D)

Area
  - Total: 67.1 sq mi (173.8 km^{2})
  - Land: 67.1 sq mi (173.7 km^{2})
  - Water: 0.039 sq mi (0.1 km^{2})
- Elevation: 1,168 ft (356 m)

Population (2010)
  - Total: 737
  - Density: 11/sq mi (4.2/km^{2})
- Time zone: UTC-5 (Eastern (EST))
  - Summer (DST): UTC-4 (EDT)
- ZIP Codes: 12923 (Churubusco); 12934 (Ellenburg Center); 12935 (Ellenburg Depot); 12920 (Chateaugay)
- FIPS code: 36-16397
- GNIS feature ID: 978840
- Website: ourtownofclinton.com

Clinton is a town in Clinton County, New York, United States. The population was 737 at the 2010 census. The town is located in the northwestern corner of the county and is northwest of Plattsburgh.

== History ==
The area was settled before 1820, near the community of Frontier. The town was set apart from the town of Ellenburg in 1845.

== Geography ==
According to the United States Census Bureau, the town of Clinton has a total area of 67.1 square miles (173.8 km^{2}), of which 67.1 square miles (173.7 km^{2}) is land and 0.04 square miles (0.1 km^{2}), or 0.04%, is water.

The northern town line is the Canada–US border with Quebec in Canada, and the western town line is the border of the town of Chateaugay in Franklin County.

U.S. Route 11 is an east-west highway, which intersects New York State Route 189, a north-south highway, south of Churubusco.

== Demographics ==
Historical population
Census	Pop.	Note	%±
1850	1,436		—
1860	1,924		34.0%
1870	2,206		14.7%
1880	2,194		−0.5%
1890	1,750		−20.2%
1900	1,574		−10.1%
1910	1,598		1.5%
1920	1,395		−12.7%
1930	1,191		−14.6%
1940	1,157		−2.9%
1950	844		−27.1%
1960	796		−5.7%
1970	712		−10.6%
1980	685		−3.8%
1990	663		−3.2%
2000	727		9.7%
2010	737		1.4%
2020	652		−11.5%
2023 (est.)	651		−0.2%
U.S. Decennial Census

As of the census of 2000, there were 727 people, 270 households, and 201 families residing in the town. The population density was 10.8 inhabitants per square mile (4.2/km^{2}). There were 348 housing units at an average density of 5.2 per square mile (2.0/km^{2}). The racial makeup of the town was 98.35% White, 0.28% African American, 0.14% Asian, 0.28% from other races, and 0.96% from two or more races. Hispanic or Latino of any race were 0.28% of the population.

There were 270 households, out of which 31.9% had children under the age of 18 living with them, 60.4% were married couples living together, 7.4% had a female householder with no husband present, and 25.2% were non-families. 19.6% of all households were made up of individuals, and 8.1% had someone living alone who was 65 years of age or older. The average household size was 2.69 and the average family size was 3.08.

In the town, the population was spread out, with 26.3% under the age of 18, 5.6% from 18 to 24, 30.4% from 25 to 44, 23.8% from 45 to 64, and 13.9% who were 65 years of age or older. The median age was 38 years. For every 100 females, there were 113.2 males. For every 100 females age 18 and over, there were 114.4 males.

The median income for a household in the town was $28,750, and the median income for a family was $34,375. Males had a median income of $25,804 versus $27,292 for females. The per capita income for the town was $11,787. About 14.7% of families and 17.9% of the population were below the poverty line, including 21.2% of those under age 18 and 20.6% of those age 65 or over.

== Communities and locations in Clinton ==
- Churubusco – A hamlet on NY-189, north of US-11, in the central part of the town.
- Clinton Mills – A hamlet east of Churubusco on Clinton Mills Road.
- English River – A small stream in the eastern part of Clinton.
- Frontier – A hamlet on the Canada–US border in the northwestern part of the town.
- Gibson Corners – A location on the northeastern town line on Clinton Mills Road.

== See also ==
- List of towns in New York
