= Winthrop, New York =

- Census-designated place
- Location within New York Location within the United States
- Coordinates: 44°47′44″N 74°47′9″W
- Country: United States
- State: New York
- County: St. Lawrence
- Town: Stockholm

Area
  - Total: 2.80 sq mi (7.25 km^{2})
  - Land: 2.78 sq mi (7.19 km^{2})
  - Water: 0.023 sq mi (0.06 km^{2})
- Elevation: 338 ft (103 m)

Population (2020)
  - Total: 489
  - Density: 180/sq mi (68/km^{2})
- Time zone: UTC-5 (Eastern (EST))
  - Summer (DST): UTC-4 (EDT)
- ZIP Code: 13697; 13613 (Brasher Falls)
- Area codes: 315/680
- FIPS code: 36-82612
- GNIS feature ID: 2584303

Winthrop is a hamlet and census-designated place (CDP) in the town of Stockholm in St. Lawrence County, New York, United States. As of the 2020 census, Winthrop had a population of 489.

The community is in northeastern St. Lawrence County, in the northeastern part of the town of Stockholm. It is bordered to the northeast by the community of Brasher Falls in the town of Brasher. The St. Regis River, a tributary of the St. Lawrence River, forms the southeastern border.

New York State Route 11C passes through Winthrop, leading southwest 3 miles (5 km) to U.S. Route 11 at Stockholm Center, and looping northeast, east, and south 8 miles (13 km) to rejoin Route 11 at Cotey Corners in the town of Lawrence. The village of Potsdam is 13 miles (21 km) southwest of Winthrop. State Route 420 crosses NY 11C in the center of Winthrop; it leads north-northwest 11 miles (18 km) to Massena and south 1.5 miles (2.4 km) to US-11.

== Demographics ==
Historical population
Census	Pop.	Note	%±
2020	489		—
U.S. Decennial Census

== Education ==
The school district is Brasher Falls Central School District.

== See also ==
- Brasher Falls–Winthrop, New York
