= Fort Brewerton =

- U.S. National Register of Historic Places
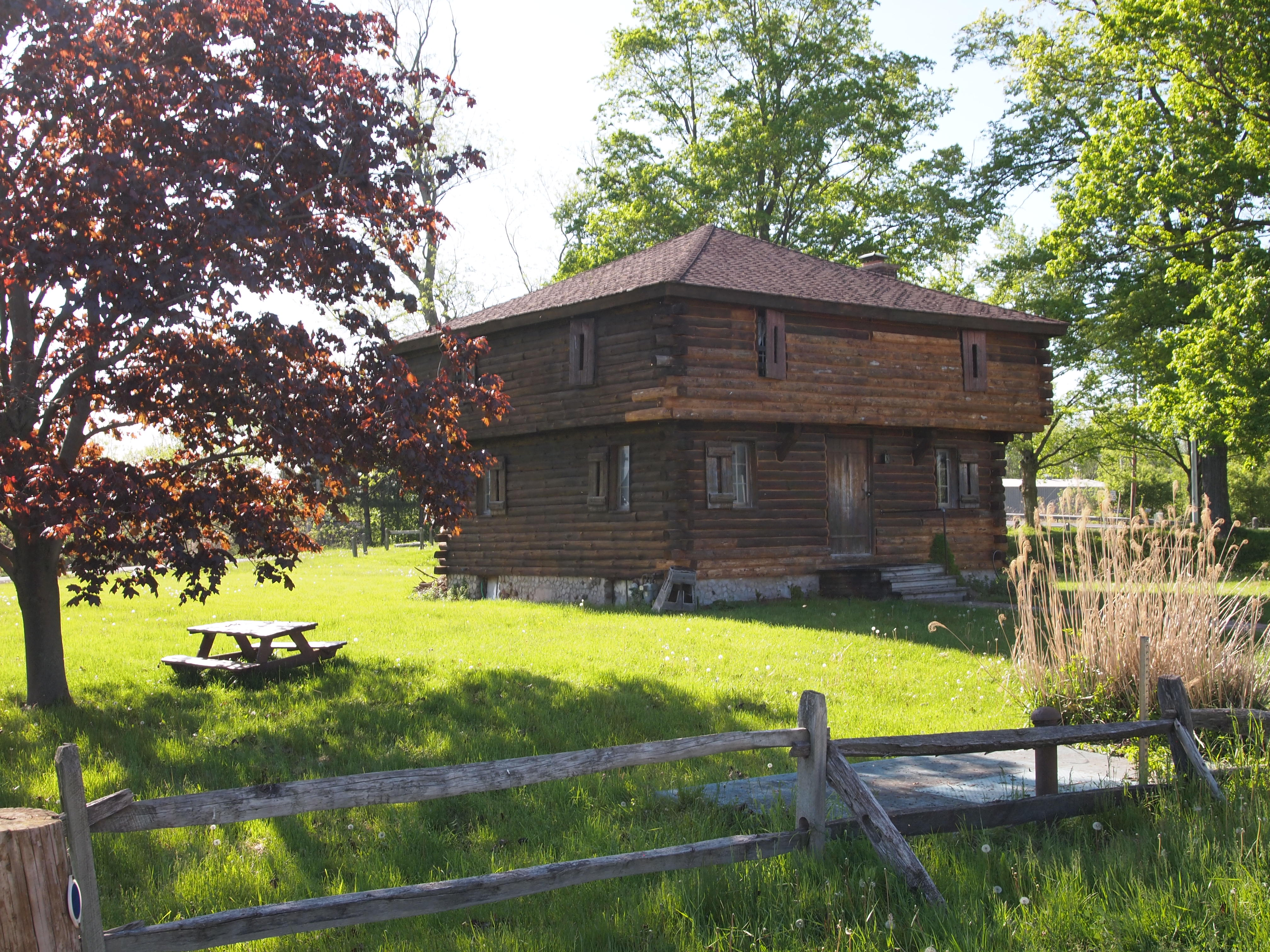
- Outside view of the recreated Oliver Stevens Block House

- Location within New York Location within the United States
- Location: State and Lansing Sts., Brewerton, New York
- Coordinates: 43°14′32″N 76°8′29″W
- Area: 0 acres (0 ha)
- NRHP reference No.: 73001247
- Added to NRHP: March 7, 1973

Fort Brewerton is a historic fort site located at Brewerton in Oswego County, New York. It is the site of a fort that originally was in the form of an eight-pointed star with sixteen 30-foot (9.1 m) faces surrounded by a 10-foot (3.0 m) moat. The 480-foot-long (150 m) parapet had earth walls 5 feet (1.5 m) high from which projected log palisades. Within the parapet were four log blockhouses, smaller buildings for munitions and supplies, and wells. It was erected in 1759 to defend the passage from Albany to the port of Oswego.

It was listed on the National Register of Historic Places in 1973.

The Fort Brewerton Historical Society operates the Oliver Stevens Blockhouse Museum, with excavated artifacts and exhibits about the fort and area history. The museum is a log reconstruction of a late 18th-century log block house that was located on the site. The museum is open 12-4pm on the third Saturday of each month from April through December as well as special events. Private tours are available by request.
