= Ellenburg Center, New York =

- Hamlet
- Location within New York Location within the United States
- Coordinates: 44°51′53″N 73°53′50″W
- Country: United States
- State: New York
- County: Clinton
- Elevation: 1,220 ft (370 m)
- Time zone: UTC-5 (Eastern (EST))
  - Summer (DST): UTC-4 (EDT)
- ZIP code: 12934
- Area codes: 518 & 838
- GNIS feature ID: 949505

Ellenburg Center is a hamlet in Clinton County, New York, United States. The community is 24.6 miles (39.6 km) west-northwest of Plattsburgh. Ellenburg Center has a post office with ZIP code 12934, which opened on April 19, 1856.
