= Brasher, New York =

- Town
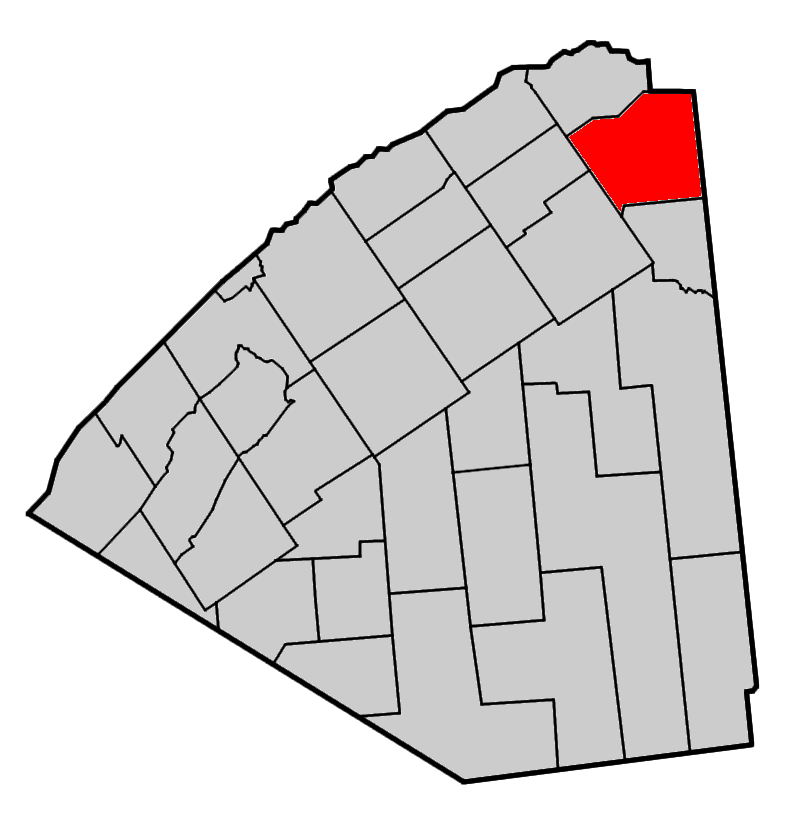
- Map highlighting Brasher's location within St. Lawrence County.

- Location within the state of New York
- Coordinates: 44°52′33″N 74°43′4″W
- Country: United States
- State: New York
- County: St. Lawrence

Area
  - Total: 92.07 sq mi (238.46 km^{2})
  - Land: 91.10 sq mi (235.96 km^{2})
  - Water: 0.97 sq mi (2.50 km^{2})
- Elevation: 240 ft (73 m)

Population (2010)
  - Total: 2,512
  - Estimate (2016): 2,410
  - Density: 26.4/sq mi (10.21/km^{2})
- Time zone: UTC-5 (Eastern (EST))
  - Summer (DST): UTC-4 (EDT)
- FIPS code: 36-07938
- GNIS feature ID: 0978750
- Website: https://townofbrasher.gov/

Brasher is a town in St. Lawrence County, New York, United States. The population was 2,512 at the 2010 census. The town is named after Philip Brasher, an original landowner.

Brasher is in the northeastern corner of the county and is southeast of Massena.

== History ==
Settlement began after 1815, as the town was organized in 1825 from the town of Massena. In 1827, a small part of the town of Lawrence was added to Brasher.

The boundary between Lawrence and Brasher originally continued straight across the St. Regis River to the Stockholm town line. It was changed to follow the center of the river upstream to the Stockholm line. The iron industry played an important part in the early history of the town, initially mining and smelting, but later including the production of stoves and other goods.

== Geography ==
According to the United States Census Bureau, the town has a total area of 92.1 square miles (239 km^{2}), of which 91.2 square miles (236 km^{2}) is land and 0.9 square miles (2.3 km^{2}) (0.97%) is water.

The St. Regis River, a tributary of the St. Lawrence River, flows in the western part of the town. The Deer River flows into the St. Regis at Helena. Smaller tributaries are Bell Brook, Squeak Brook, Lawrence Brook, Red Water Brook and Trout Brook. Red Water Brook was dammed in the 1930s by the Civilian Conservation Corps. At the location of the pond, Walter Pratt Memorial Forest is the site of a primitive camping and picnic area operated by NY State Dept. of Environmental Conservation, known locally as the "CC Dam". There are nearly 20,000 acres of NY State owned forest lands in the town and the DEC has a maintenance facility located near Vice Rd. in Brasher Falls. Many miles of Trails are maintained in the State Forest. These trails are used for hiking, hunting, fishing, cross-country skiing, horseback riding and snowmobiling. All terrain vehicles have been a subject of controversy and are not currently permitted on state lands.

New York State Route 37C is an east–west highway in the northern part of Brasher. New York State Route 11C passes through the southwest corner of the town.

The eastern town line is the border of Franklin County. The town is bordered on the northeastern corner by the St. Regis Mohawk Reservation.

== Demographics ==
Historical population
Census	Pop.	Note	%±
1830	828		—
1840	2,118		155.8%
1850	2,582		21.9%
1860	3,377		30.8%
1870	3,342		−1.0%
1880	3,578		7.1%
1890	2,910		−18.7%
1900	2,703		−7.1%
1910	2,179		−19.4%
1920	1,922		−11.8%
1930	1,706		−11.2%
1940	1,892		10.9%
1950	1,916		1.3%
1960	2,536		32.4%
1970	2,410		−5.0%
1980	2,375		−1.5%
1990	2,124		−10.6%
2000	2,337		10.0%
2010	2,512		7.5%
2016 (est.)	2,410		−4.1%
U.S. Decennial Census

As of the census of 2000, there were 2,337 people, 940 households, and 642 families residing in the town. The population density was 25.6 inhabitants per square mile (9.9/km^{2}). There were 1,077 housing units at an average density of 11.8 per square mile (4.6/km^{2}). The racial makeup of the town was 96.66% White, 0.21% African American, 2.01% Native American, 0.39% Asian, 0.09% from other races, and 0.64% from two or more races. Hispanic or Latino of any race were 0.86% of the population.

There were 940 households, out of which 31.0% had children under the age of 18 living with them, 52.4% were married couples living together, 10.4% had a female householder with no husband present, and 31.6% were non-families. 25.0% of all households were made up of individuals, and 13.1% had someone living alone who was 65 years of age or older. The average household size was 2.48 and the average family size was 2.93.

In the town, the population was spread out, with 25.0% under the age of 18, 7.4% from 18 to 24, 28.1% from 25 to 44, 25.1% from 45 to 64, and 14.5% who were 65 years of age or older. The median age was 38 years. For every 100 females, there were 96.7 males. For every 100 females age 18 and over, there were 93.0 males.

The median household income in the town was $30,909, and the median income for a family was $36,389. Males had a median income of $36,422 versus $20,101 for females. The per capita income for the town was $16,808. About 14.0% of families and 19.1% of the population were below the poverty line, including 30.1% of those under age 18 and 17.0% of those age 65 or over.

The majority of Brasher is served by Brasher Falls Central School District, also known as "St. Lawrence Central". Most of the town's electricity is supplied by National Grid with an area in the Northwest portion served by Massena Electric. Brasher Falls and the neighboring hamlet of Winthrop have a municipal sewer system. A study of the feasibility of municipal water in Brasher Falls- Winthrop area has stirred controversy. Contaminated wells in the area has generated interest, however many residents have suitable wells and do not favor the added expense. The hamlet of Helena has a municipal water system, necessitated by ground water contamination rendering the area's well water unsuitable. Landline telephone and internet service is provided by: Verizon, Nicholville Telephone Company, SLIC and Time-Warner; with wireless service provided by Verizon Wireless and AT&T. Enbridge supplies natural gas to the Brasher Falls- Winthrop area.

== Communities and locations in Brasher ==
- Brasher Center – A hamlet on County Road 53 on the west bank of the St. Regis River, in the western part of the town. Development of the community began in 1826 with the construction of a dam and a mill.
- Brasher Falls – A hamlet in the southeastern corner of the town on NY-11C that straddles the St. Regis River.
- Brasher Iron Works – A location on County Road 55 in the northern part of the town. It was the site of iron works first opened in 1836.
- Deer River – A stream in the south part of the town.
- Helena – A hamlet at the junction of NY-37C and County Road 37 on the south bank of the St. Regis River. The name is from Helen Pitcairn, the daughter of a landowner, and the community was founded in 1819.
- Ironton – A location east of Brasher Iron Works in the northeastern part of Brasher at the junction of Smith Road and the New York-Ottawa Railroad (Abandoned).
