= Stockholm, New York =

- Town
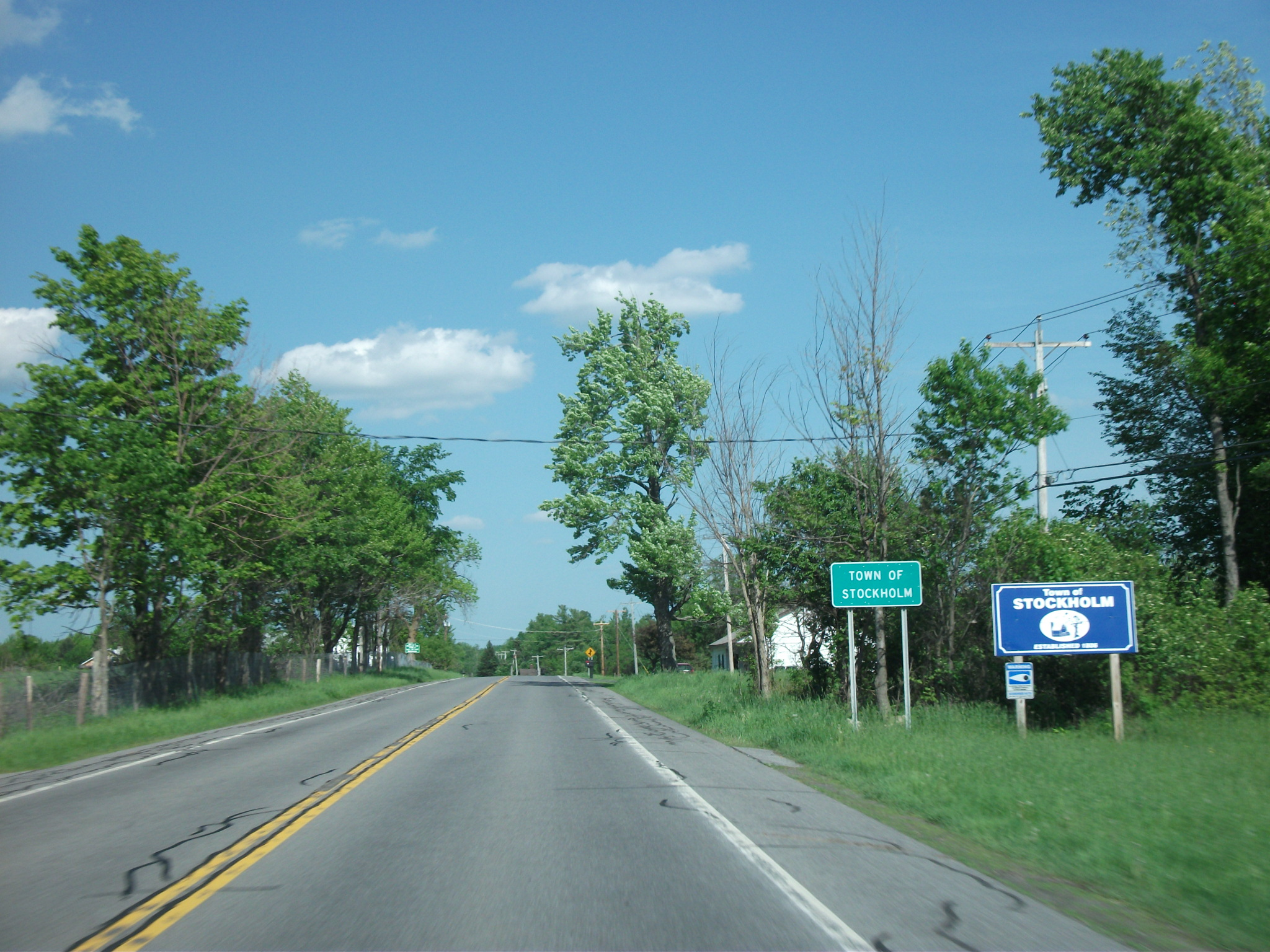
- Signage denoting entrance into the town of Stockholm along New York State Route 11B.

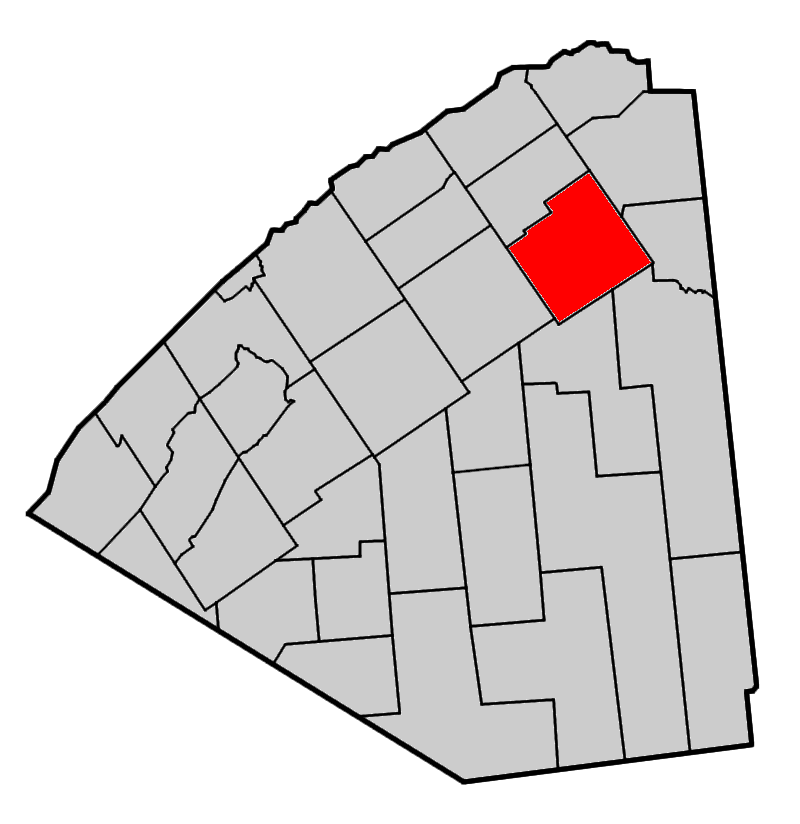
- Map highlighting Stockholm's location within St. Lawrence County.

- Location within the state of New York
- Coordinates: 44°45′35″N 74°51′11″W
- Country: United States
- State: New York
- County: St. Lawrence

Area
  - Total: 94.29 sq mi (244.21 km^{2})
  - Land: 93.90 sq mi (243.19 km^{2})
  - Water: 0.39 sq mi (1.02 km^{2})
- Elevation: 381 ft (116 m)

Population (2020)
  - Total: 3,816
  - Density: 38.6/sq mi (14.89/km^{2})
- Time zone: UTC-5 (Eastern (EST))
  - Summer (DST): UTC-4 (EDT)
- FIPS code: 36-71410
- GNIS feature ID: 0979528
- Website: https://www.stockholmny.gov/

Stockholm is a town in St. Lawrence County, New York, United States. The population was 3,665 at the 2010 census. The name was assigned by surveyors from Stockholm in Sweden.

The town is in the northeastern part of the county and is northeast of Potsdam.

== History ==
Stockholm was erected from part of the town of Massena by a legislative act passed February 21, 1806. It received its name by the surveyors from Stockholm, Sweden. It retained its original territory until April 9, 1823, when a part was annexed to Norfolk, and on April 15, 1834, another portion was annexed to the same town. During the War of 1812 some residents left the town and a lesser number returned.

== Geography ==
According to the United States Census Bureau, the town has a total area of 94.3 square miles (244 km^{2}), of which 93.9 square miles (243 km^{2}) is land and 0.3 square miles (0.78 km^{2}) (0.37%) is water.

The St. Regis River flows northward through the eastern part of the town.

U.S. Route 11 passes through the town. New York State Route 420 crosses the northeastern corner of the town.

== Demographics ==
Historical population
Census	Pop.	Note	%±
1820	822		—
1830	1,944		136.5%
1840	2,995		54.1%
1850	3,661		22.2%
1860	4,074		11.3%
1870	3,819		−6.3%
1880	3,441		−9.9%
1890	2,999		−12.8%
1900	2,826		−5.8%
1910	2,614		−7.5%
1920	2,437		−6.8%
1930	2,253		−7.6%
1940	2,406		6.8%
1950	2,558		6.3%
1960	3,465		35.5%
1970	3,597		3.8%
1980	3,676		2.2%
1990	3,533		−3.9%
2000	3,592		1.7%
2010	3,665		2.0%
2020	3,816		4.1%
U.S. Decennial Census

As of the census of 2000, there were 3,592 people, 1,381 households, and 999 families residing in the town. The population density was 38.2 inhabitants per square mile (14.7/km^{2}). There were 1,520 housing units at an average density of 16.2 per square mile (6.3/km^{2}). The racial makeup of the town was 97.91% White, 0.33% African American, 0.42% Native American, 0.19% Asian, 0.14% from other races, and 1.00% from two or more races. Hispanic or Latino of any race were 0.50% of the population.

There were 1,381 households, out of which 35.8% had children under the age of 18 living with them, 57.0% were married couples living together, 10.0% had a female householder with no husband present, and 27.6% were non-families. 22.4% of all households were made up of individuals, and 8.6% had someone living alone who was 65 years of age or older. The average household size was 2.60 and the average family size was 3.01.

In the town, the population was spread out, with 27.6% under the age of 18, 8.3% from 18 to 24, 28.3% from 25 to 44, 23.6% from 45 to 64, and 12.3% who were 65 years of age or older. The median age was 36 years. For every 100 females, there were 98.8 males. For every 100 females age 18 and over, there were 93.7 males.

The median income for a household in the town was $30,720, and the median income for a family was $38,370. Males had a median income of $30,444 versus $21,821 for females. The per capita income for the town was $15,109. About 11.2% of families and 16.0% of the population were below the poverty line, including 25.3% of those under age 18 and 6.2% of those age 65 or over.

== Communities and locations in Stockholm ==
- Armstrong Corners – A hamlet near the western town line on US-11 at County Road 57.
- Beechertown – A hamlet near the southern town line.
- Brookdale (formerly "Scotland") – A hamlet on County Road 49.
- Buckton (or "Bucks Corners") – A location south of Stockholm Center on County Road 47.
- Converse – A hamlet in the southern part of the town on NY-11B east of Southville.
- East Part – A hamlet east of Stockholm Center on US-11.
- Kellogg – A location in the southeastern corner of the town on County Road 49.
- Knapps Station – A former location near the western town line.
- North Stockholm – A hamlet in the northwestern part of the town.
- Sandfordville – A hamlet in the western part of the town.
- Skinnerville – A hamlet north of Stockholm Center, located on the St. Regis River.
- Southville – A hamlet in the southern part of the town on NY-11B. The community was previously called "South Stockholm."
- Stockholm Center – A hamlet on US-11 near the center of the town.
- West Stockholm – A hamlet, formerly called "Bickneyville," in the western part of the town. The West Stockholm Historic District was listed on the National Register of Historic Places in 1979.
- Winthrop (formerly "Stockholm" and "Stockholm Depot") – A hamlet on NY-11C in the eastern part of the town, by the St. Regis River.
