= New York State Route 37 =

State highway in the North Country of New York

New York State Route 37
- Map of northern New York with NY 37 highlighted in red, NY 37C in blue, and former NY 37D in pink

Route information
- Maintained by NYSDOT
- Length: 127.40 mi (205.03 km)
- Existed: 1930–present
- Tourist routes: Great Lakes Seaway Trail

Major junctions
- West end: US 11 in Pamelia
- NY 812 in Ogdensburg; NY 56 in Massena; R-132 near Massena
- East end: US 11 / NY 11B / NY 30 in Malone

Location
- Country: United States
- State: New York
- Counties: Jefferson, St. Lawrence, Franklin

Highway system
- New York Highways; Interstate; US; State; Reference; Parkways
← NY 36A	→ NY 37B
← NY 37B	NY 37C	→ NY 38

New York State Route 37 (NY 37) is a state highway in the North Country of New York in the United States, extending for 127.40 miles (205.03 km) on a west–east axis. The western terminus of the route is at an intersection with U.S. Route 11 (US 11) in Pamelia, Jefferson County. Its eastern terminus is at a junction with US 11, NY 11B, and NY 30 in Malone, Franklin County. In between the termini, NY 37 passes through Ogdensburg and Massena. It is a two-lane, nondivided, full access roadway for most of its entire length, except for portions between Massena and western Franklin County, where the route widens to a four-lane divided highway.

NY 37 was assigned in 1930 to the portion of the Theodore Roosevelt International Highway between Redwood and Malone as well as to a previously unnumbered roadway between Watertown and Redwood. The Redwood–Malone portion was originally part of NY 3 when the first set of posted routes in New York were assigned in 1924. NY 37 has since been rerouted in areas, primarily near Ogdensburg and Massena.

== Route description ==
=== Watertown to Ogdensburg ===
NY 37 begins at an intersection with US 11 just north of Watertown in the town of Pamelia. Between Watertown and Theresa, NY 37 follows a north–south alignment and parallels Interstate 81 (I-81), located just west of NY 37. Southwest of Theresa, I-81 turns to the northwest as NY 37 intersects NY 26 and NY 411, the westward continuation of NY 26. NY 26 joins NY 37 around the western edge of the village before splitting to the northwest a short distance to the north. NY 37, however, continues northward, passing through Redwood before curving northeast as it enters St. Lawrence County.

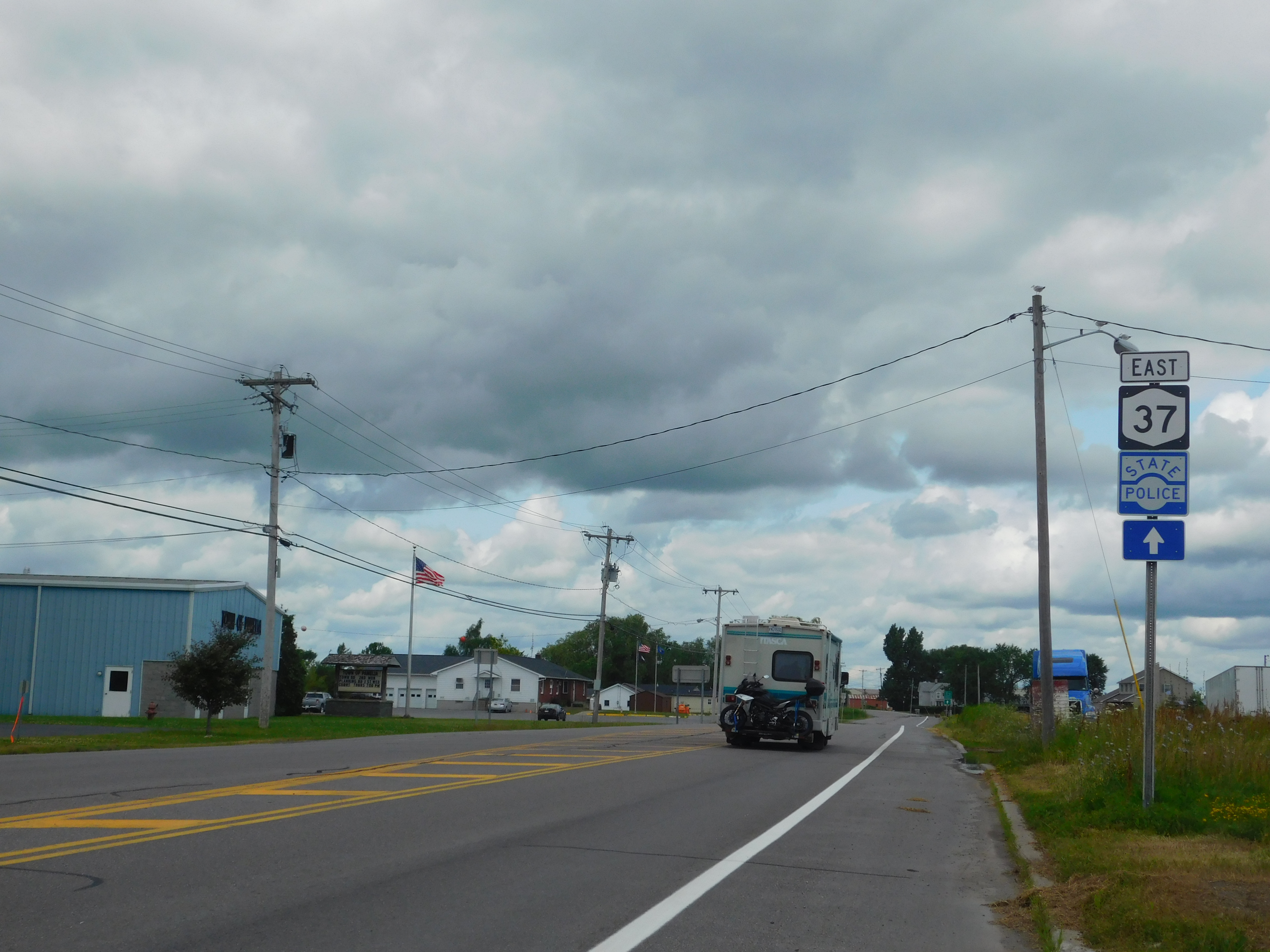
NY 37 eastbound in Pamelia

Across the county line, NY 37 parallels NY 12 to the north as both routes proceed northeast. Roughly 7 miles (11 km) from the county line, NY 37 encounters Hammond, a small village located west of Black Lake. Past Hammond, Route 37 heads north toward Morristown, where it meets NY 12, the primary roadway along the St. Lawrence River's southern bank west of this point. NY 12 ends here; however, NY 37 takes over the routing of NY 12 and proceeds northeast along the edge of the St. Lawrence River. Just east of NY 12, NY 37 meets the northernmost point of NY 58.

Midway between Morristown and Ogdensburg, NY 37 enters St. Lawrence State Park, one of many New York state parks located on the southern bank of the river. The route exits the park and heads northeast to Ogdensburg, where it meets NY 68 (the former routing of NY 37 into Ogdensburg) west of the city. While NY 68 continues into downtown, NY 37 turns eastward, then northeastward and bypasses the city to the south. Near the Ogdensburg International Airport, NY 37 meets NY 812 at an interchange. Here, NY 812 joins NY 37 and the two routes intersect NY 68 once more before leaving Ogdensburg.

=== Ogdensburg to Massena ===
Just outside Ogdensburg, NY 812 separates from NY 37 to continue northward to Canada over the Ogdensburg–Prescott International Bridge, where it becomes Highway 16 farther inland. NY 37, however, continues to follow the south bank of the St. Lawrence River, passing Galop Island State Park on its way to Waddington, where it intersects the northernmost point on NY 345. East of the village, NY 37 passes south of the riverside Coles Creek State Park and traverses Coles Creek itself.

In the Louisville hamlet of Louisville Corner (west of Massena), NY 37 departs the St. Lawrence River and intersects the western end of NY 131, a northerly bypass of Massena along the riverbank. Farther east in Massena, NY 37 intersects NY 37B, the former routing of NY 37 through Massena, west of the village before crossing over the Grasse River and intersecting the northern termini of both NY 56 (where NY 37 widens into a four-lane divided highway) and NY 420. NY 37B later rejoins NY 37 east of the village, as does NY 131 directly north of the Massena International Airport.

=== Eastern St. Lawrence and Franklin counties ===
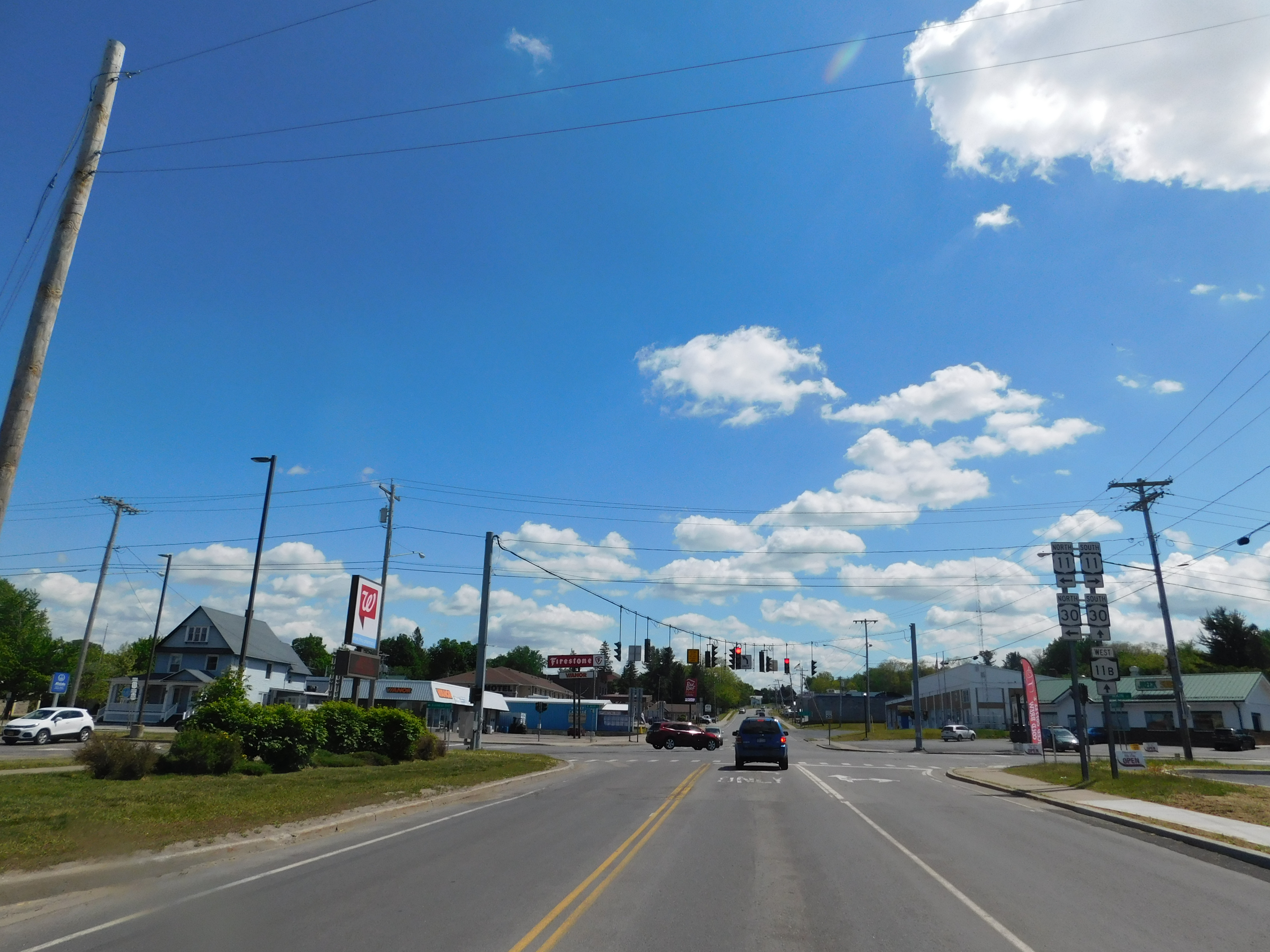
Eastern terminus of NY 37 in Malone

East of the airport in the town of Massena, NY 37 begins to parallel the north bank of the Raquette River as it intersects NY 37C near a hamlet named for the waterway. NY 37 and the river continue northeast to the vicinity of the hamlet of Rooseveltown, where NY 37 formerly connected to a large traffic circle linking NY 37 to the Three Nations Crossing as well as County Route 45 (CR 45). The traffic circle has since been replaced with a T-intersection and traffic light because of the expansion of the American Customs facility. Upon crossing into Franklin County and the St. Regis Mohawk Reservation a short distance to the east, the road narrows back to a two-lane undivided highway and crosses over the Raquette River.

Although most of NY 37 in the town of Bombay is contained within the reservation, a short portion east of Hogansburg and the St. Regis River and west of Tarbell Road is located outside the reservation limits. Within this stretch, NY 37 meets both the eastern end of NY 37C and the northern terminus of NY 95. East of the reservation, NY 37 roughly parallels the CSX Transportation-owned Montreal Subdivision northeast to Fort Covington, where NY 37 crosses the railroad line and intersects Water Street (unsigned NY 970T), a connector to Quebec Route 132 on the northern side of the Canadian border.

East of Fort Covington, NY 37 follows a more southeasterly routing as it separates from the northernmost extents of the state. In the Westville hamlet of Westville Center, NY 37 meets the western terminus of NY 122. Farther south, NY 37 enters the village of Malone, where it terminates at US 11, NY 11B and NY 30.

== History ==
The portion of NY 37 from Redwood to Malone was originally part of the Theodore Roosevelt International Highway, an international auto trail connecting Portland, Maine, on the Atlantic Ocean coast to Portland, Oregon, east of the Pacific Ocean. When the first set of posted routes in New York were assigned in 1924, the entirety of the Roosevelt Highway in New York was designated NY 3. In the 1930 renumbering of state highways in New York, NY 3 was rerouted to follow its current routing between Watertown and Plattsburgh. The former routing of NY 3 along the St. Lawrence River became part of the new NY 37, which utilized a previously unnumbered highway between Watertown and Redwood via Theresa. Initially, NY 37 directly served Theresa by way of modern CR 136, CR 46, and CR 193; however, it was realigned c. 1934 to bypass the village to the west.

When NY 37 was first assigned, it entered Ogdensburg on Main Street (modern NY 68) and exited the city on Ford Street and Proctor Avenue. East of the city, NY 37 used less than 1 mile (1.6 km) of its modern alignment before turning south to follow Van Rensselaer Road to Waddington. The modern, riverside alignment of NY 37 between Ogdensburg and Waddington was designated as NY 37A as part of the 1930 renumbering. In the late 1950s, the alignments of NY 37 and NY 37A were flipped, placing NY 37 on its current routing and NY 37A on Van Rensselaer Road. During the same time period, NY 37 was rerouted to follow a new bypass around the southern edge of Ogdensburg.

In the Massena area, NY 37 originally broke from its modern alignment west of the village and followed what is now NY 37B east to Main Street. Here, it turned south onto Main Street to traverse the Grasse River before continuing east on Orvis Street (and meeting modern NY 37B at Center Street) to reconnect to its current alignment east of the village. Lastly, from modern NY 131 adjacent to the Massena International Airport to Rooseveltown, NY 37 was initially routed on Trippany Road, NY 37C, and Roosevelt Road. In the mid-1950s, construction began on a new southern bypass of Massena that connected to NY 37 at the modern termini of NY 37B. It was completed and opened to traffic by 1958. Work on an eastward, divided highway extension of the bypass to Rooseveltown began c. 1961. The final section, from the hamlet of Raquette River to Rooseveltown, opened to traffic later that year.

== Suffixed routes ==
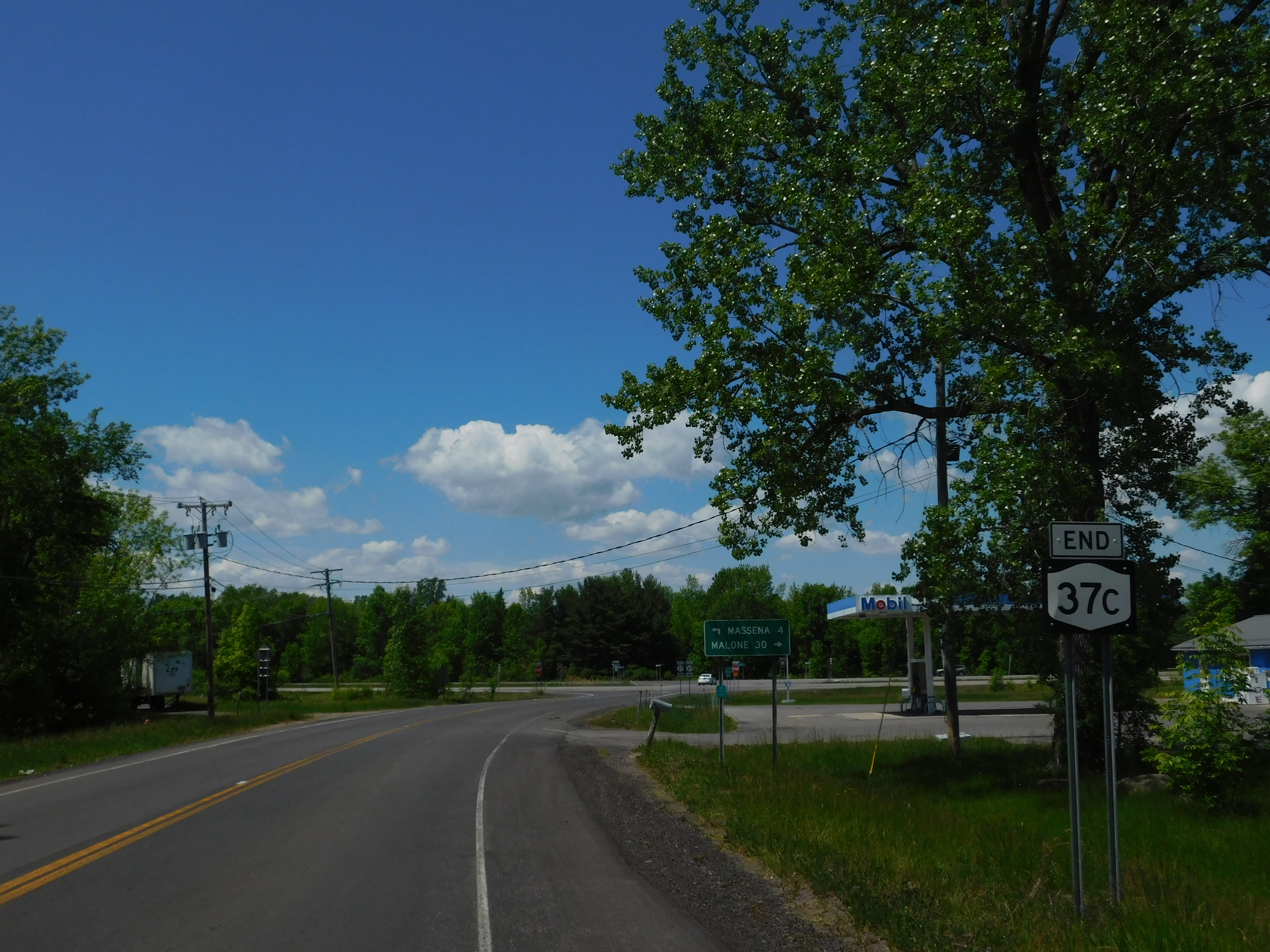
NY 37C approaching NY 37 in Massena

NY 37 once had as many as four suffixed routes; two have since been removed.

- NY 37A was an alternate route of NY 37 between Ogdensburg and Waddington. It was assigned as part of the 1930 renumbering of state highways in New York to what is now NY 37 between the two locations. At the time, NY 37 was routed on Van Rensselaer Road. The alignments of NY 37 and NY 37A were flipped in the late 1950s. On April 10, 1980, the NY 37A designation was removed. Ownership and maintenance of Van Rensselaer Road was transferred from the state of New York to St. Lawrence County on September 1, 1982, at which time the highway was redesignated as CR 28.
- NY 37B (4.03 miles or 6.49 kilometres) is the former routing of NY 37 through Massena. NY 37B leaves NY 37 west of the village and rejoins its parent just east of Massena. It was assigned as part of the 1930 renumbering.
- NY 37C (9.89 miles or 15.92 kilometres) is a loop off of NY 37 in northeastern St. Lawrence County and northwestern Franklin County. While NY 37 follows a direct east–west routing between Massena and the Bombay community of Hogansburg, NY 37C dips south to serve to the Brasher community of Helena. NY 37C was assigned as part of the 1930 renumbering.
- NY 37D was a spur connecting NY 37 to NY 26 in Theresa, utilizing part of NY 37's original alignment through the Theresa area. It was assigned c. 1936 and removed in the mid-1960s. It is now maintained by Jefferson County as CR 136 and CR 46.

== Major intersections ==
County	Location	mi	km	Destinations	Notes
Jefferson	Pamelia	0.00	0.00	US 11 – Watertown, Potsdam	Western terminus
Jefferson	Pamelia	2.66	4.28	NY 342 to I-81 – Fort Drum, Black River	Hamlet of Pamelia Center
Jefferson	Town of Theresa	13.87	22.32	CR 136	Former western terminus of NY 37D
Jefferson	Town of Theresa	15.91	25.60	NY 26 south / NY 411 west to I-81 – Lafargeville, Theresa	Eastern terminus of NY 411; southern terminus of NY 26 / NY 37 overlap
Jefferson	Town of Theresa	18.51	29.79	NY 26 north – Alexandria Bay	Northern terminus of NY 26 / NY 37 overlap
St. Lawrence	Hammond	33.67	54.19	CR 3	Former western terminus of NY 185
St. Lawrence	Town of Morristown	43.74	70.39	NY 12 south / Great Lakes Seaway Trail – Alexandria Bay	Northern terminus of NY 12
St. Lawrence	Town of Morristown	43.99	70.80	NY 58 south – Gouverneur	Northern terminus of NY 58; hamlet of Morristown
St. Lawrence	Oswegatchie	53.49	86.08	NY 68 east / Great Lakes Seaway Trail	Western terminus of NY 68
St. Lawrence	Oswegatchie	55.61	89.50	NY 812 south – Heuvelton, Ogdensburg Airport	Western terminus of NY 37 / NY 812 overlap
St. Lawrence	Oswegatchie	55.61	89.50	NY 970E (State Street) – Ogdensburg	Southern terminus of unsigned NY 970E
St. Lawrence	Oswegatchie	55.95	90.04	NY 68 – Ogdensburg, Canton	
St. Lawrence	Ogdensburg	58.02	93.37	NY 812 north / Great Lakes Seaway Trail – Bridge to Canada	Eastern terminus of NY 37 / NY 812 overlap
St. Lawrence	Lisbon	59.27	95.39	CR 28 – Lisbon	Former western terminus of NY 37A
St. Lawrence	Town of Waddington	73.02	117.51	CR 28	Former eastern terminus of NY 37A
St. Lawrence	Village of Waddington	74.19	119.40	NY 345 south – Madrid	Northern terminus of NY 345
St. Lawrence	Louisville	84.10	135.35	NY 131 east / Great Lakes Seaway Trail	Western terminus of NY 131
St. Lawrence	Louisville	88.49	142.41	NY 37B east – Massena	Western terminus of NY 37B
St. Lawrence	Louisville	89.42	143.91	NY 56 south – Potsdam NY 970C north (Andrews Street) – Massena	Northern terminus of NY 56; southern terminus of unsigned NY 970C
St. Lawrence	Village of Massena	90.94	146.35	NY 420 south – Winthrop NY 970B north (Main Street) – Business District	Northern terminus of NY 420; southern terminus of unsigned NY 970B
St. Lawrence	Town of Massena	92.77	149.30	NY 37B west – Massena Business District	Eastern terminus of NY 37B
St. Lawrence	Town of Massena	94.49	152.07	NY 131 west / Great Lakes Seaway Trail – Robert Moses State Park, Nature Center, Eisenhower Lock, Power Dam	Eastern terminus of NY 131
St. Lawrence	Town of Massena	96.51	155.32	NY 37C east – Helena	Western terminus of NY 37C
St. Lawrence	Town of Massena	100.34	161.48	To Highway 138 north / Great Lakes Seaway Trail ends – Bridge to Canada	Formerly unsigned NY 971G
Franklin	Bombay	103.76	166.99	NY 37C west – Helena	Eastern terminus of NY 37C; hamlet of Hogansburg
Franklin	Bombay	104.97	168.93	NY 95 south – Bombay, Moira	Northern terminus of NY 95
Franklin	Fort Covington	111.24	179.02	Dundee Road to R-132 east	Via unsigned NY 970T
Franklin	Westville	118.83	191.24	NY 122 east – Constable	Hamlet of Westville Center; Western terminus of NY 122
Franklin	Village of Malone	127.40	205.03	US 11 / NY 11B west / NY 30 – Chateaugay, Potsdam, Tupper Lake	Eastern terminus; eastern terminus of NY 11B
1.000 mi = 1.609 km; 1.000 km = 0.621 mi: Concurrency terminus

== See also ==
- List of county routes in Jefferson County, New York
- List of county routes in St. Lawrence County, New York
