= Massena Center, New York =

Hamlet in New York, United States

Coordinates: 44°57′36″N 74°49′53″W

Massena Center is a hamlet in the Town of Massena, in St. Lawrence County, New York, United States. It is made up of 89 homes and several small businesses.

== History ==
During the formation and founding of the towns of northern New York and the Macomb Purchase, it has become common practice for a settlement to be erected in the center of the town. The Town of Massena was incorporated with the county in 1802 but was reduced in size several times with the removal of land for the towns of Hopkinton in 1805, Louisville in 1810 and Brasher in 1825.

Massena Center is located two and one-half miles east of the Village of Massena on the north side of the Grasse River. This area is also known as the Grasse River Meadowlands, which surrounds the last five miles of the Grasse River to its mouth with the St. Lawrence River. The St. Lawrence Seaway is located along its northern border with the only two American Locks in the Seaway System. Eisenhower Lock with its visitor center is located in its northwestern corner and accessible by New York State Route 131 (which makes up the western border), while Snell Lock is located in the northeastern corner at the mouth of the Grasse River and is accessed by the Massena Center / Fregoe Road, but is not open to the public. Also located at the mouth of the Grasse River is the secondary emergency repair doors for the locks. Within this small bay floats a massive floating crane and the Tugboat Robinson Bay.

"The Center", as it has been dubbed by the locals, was founded by Nathaniel Kezar, Arad Smith, P. Smith, Ephraim Hyde, Samuel Dana, Thomas Dodge, Israel Rickard, Ira Goodrich, Peabody Kinney, Willard Seaton, Hiram Anderson, Hiram Fish and Moses Russell. The first Public House was opened by Ephrairn Hyde and Samson Wheeler in 1835. The first post official was opened in 1851, with Chloe Atwood as acting postal official. The first handsome school house was erected in 1871, next to the Massena Center Baptist Church, and was operated until 1958. Its students at the time were transferred to the old Harrowgate School in downtown Massena, and then to the newly built (now closed) Twin Rivers Elementary School located across the river.

The area was primarily agricultural, with its fertile meadowlands allowing for several large farms to operate in the area. The Rickard Farm located in the community was the first in the town of Massena to operate with a steam-powered milking machine. By the 1970s, there were seven major farms operating in the area, and the last one to operate closed in the late 1990s. Very few of the original barns exist.

Agriculture was the primary industry of Massena Center due to the fertile soils of the Grasse River Meadowlands, which allowed for large farms to form. With the creation of the Saint Lawrence Seaway, many of these farms disappeared. It can be noted by the 1960s there were seven major farms operating in the area, all who have ceased operations. The last farm operated until the late 1990s. Some farm activity still takes place.

The second bridge built across the Grasse River in the Town of Massena is located in Massena Center and was built in 1832, but was soon swept away in the ice flows of spring thaw. In 1862 at the cost of $4,000 a covered bridge was built across the river but was also destroyed. In 1873 an iron bridge was erected for $10,000.

Holton Duncan Robinson was born in 1863 in Massena Center and came to be a well known engineer. With David Steinmen, he formed the Engineering Firm of Robinson and Steinmen, who worked and designed bridges. Their firm designed such bridges as the Deer Isle Bridge in Maine, the Hercilio Luz Bridge in Florianópolis, Santa Catarina, Brazil, and the Thousand Island Bridge System on the St. Lawrence River. In 1910, Holton returned to Massena Center to design and construct the still existing suspension cable bridge across the Grasse River (bridge is closed to all traffic).

The 1944 Cornwall–Massena earthquake shook northern New York and southern Ontario on September 5 with a maximum Mercalli intensity of VII (Very strong). In the United States, the 5.8 M_{w} shock was felt from Maine to Maryland, and despite its moderate size it caused considerable effects. With several thousand chimneys collapsed, property damage was estimated at approximately $2 million.

== Landmarks ==
Union Hall is a building located .87 miles from NY State Highway 131 and was used by one of the unions for workers building the Saint Lawrence Seaway. It is unknown how long this building was in use, and it is now a residential home.

The Old Community Center is located .34 miles from NY State Highway 131 and was in use for many years. The block building stood unused for many years but is now used as a custom counter top business.

The Sunset Drive-In was located on the south side of the Grasse River on the opposite side of the hamlet and is now the site of the Massena International Kampground.

The Seaway Motel (formally the Park Inn Motel) located on the corner of New York State Highway 131 and Massena Center Road was formerly the site of a children's amusement park called Kiddieland. The motel burned in January 2005 and has ceased to operate.
