= New York State Route 131 =

State highway in St. Lawrence County, New York, US

New York State Route 131
- Map of St. Lawrence County in northern New York with NY 131 highlighted in red and NY 971J in blue

Route information
- Maintained by NYSDOT
- Length: 12.45 mi (20.04 km)
- Existed: late 1950s–present
- Tourist routes: Great Lakes Seaway Trail

Major junctions
- West end: NY 37 in Louisville
- East end: NY 37 in Massena

Location
- Country: United States
- State: New York
- Counties: St. Lawrence

Highway system
- New York Highways; Interstate; US; State; Reference; Parkways
← NY 130	→ NY 132

New York State Route 131 (NY 131) is a 12.45-mile (20.04 km) long state highway in St. Lawrence County, New York, in the United States. It serves as a coastal alternate route to NY 37, going around the village of Massena instead of through it. NY 131 leaves NY 37 in the town of Louisville and rejoins it in the town of Massena. Town Line Road, a county-maintained highway straddling the Louisville–Massena town line, serves as a connector between NY 131 and Massena village.

== Route description ==
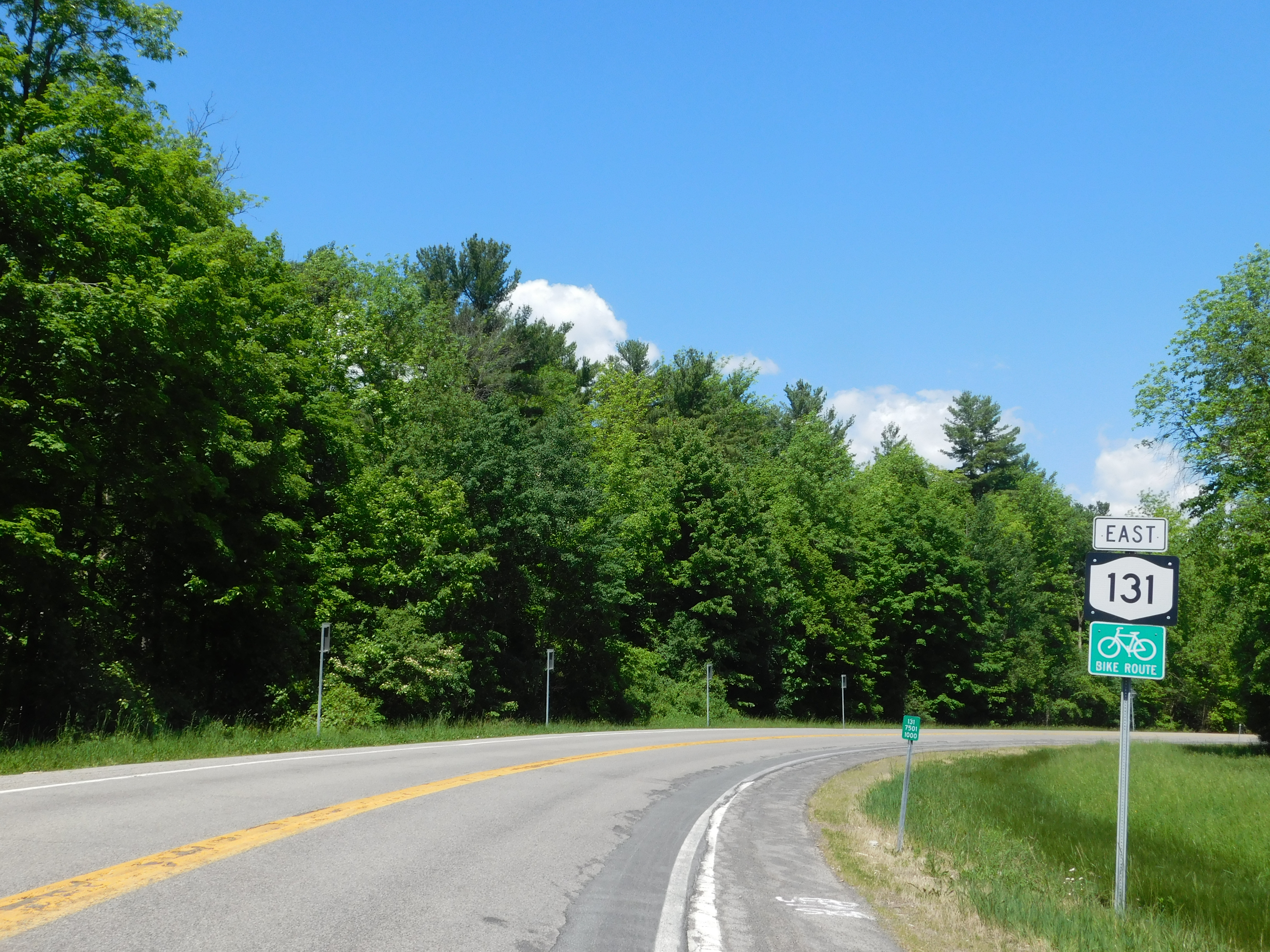
NY 131 eastbound from NY 37 in Louisville Corner

NY 131 begins at an intersection with NY 37 (Seaway Trail) in the hamlet of Louisville Corner in the town of Louisville. The route progresses northeastward on a parallel of NY 37 and the St. Lawrence River as a two-lane roadway. A short distance after the terminus, NY 131 intersects with the Wilson Hill Causeway, which connects to Wilson Hill Island. The route passes a nearby marina and some residences, soon entering the hamlet of Tucker Terrace. In Tucker Terrace, NY 131 makes a gradual curve to the southeast, passes the Massena Country Club, and intersects with County Route 41 (CR 41). Paralleling the Richards Landing Bike Trail, NY 131 makes another bend, this time back to the northeast past more riverside homes. After a distance, the amount of residences recedes, and NY 131 intersects with CR 43 (Town Line Road), which connects the route to the village of Massena. After the crossing, NY 131 leaves Louisville for the town of Massena, crossing the Massena Power Canal.

Paralleling the riverside, NY 131 passes within 100 feet (30 m) of the St. Lawrence and Long Sault Island before turning to the southeast and soon east through Massena. Some residences appear after the intersection with Dennison Road, however the route remains mainly rural, passing an inlet of the St. Lawrence just south of the intersection with Barnhart Island Road. At that intersection, NY 131 abruptly turns southward along the right-of-way and heads deeper into the town. Crossing an intersection with CR 42 (Massena-Massena Center Road), NY 131 crosses the Grass River before entering an intersection with NY 37 (Seaway Trail), where the designation terminates in St. Lawrence Center. Right near the intersection is Massena International Airport's Richards Field.

== History ==
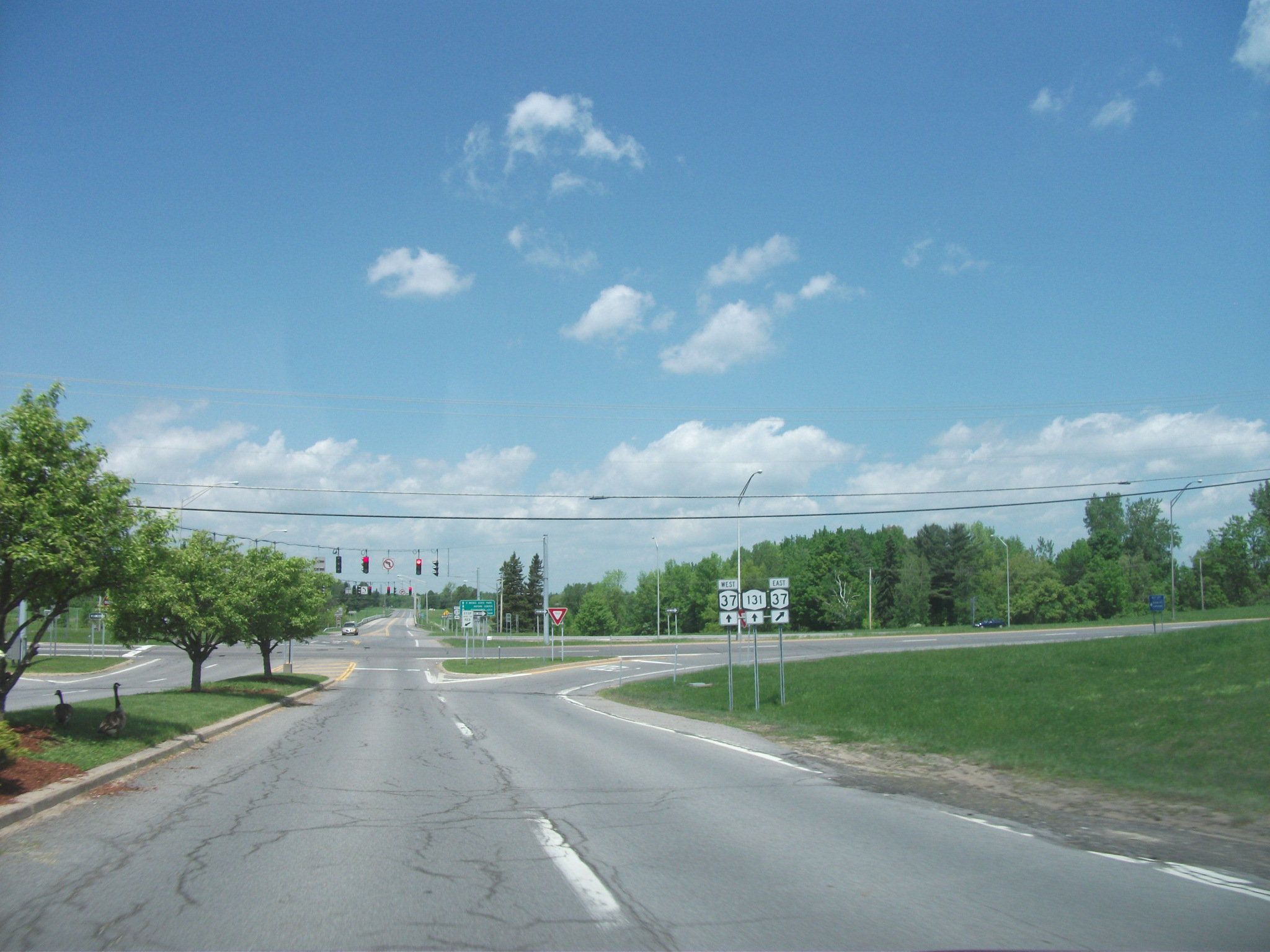
NY 37/NY 131 intersection in Massena

NY 37 originally entered the village of Massena when it was assigned as part of the 1930 renumbering of state highways in New York. In the mid-1950s, construction began on a bypass around the southern edge of the village. It opened to traffic as a realignment of NY 37 by 1958. The former alignment of NY 37 from the bypass eastward along the Grasse River to Town Line Road was designated as NY 131 by 1960. The remainder of NY 37's old routing through Massena became an extension of NY 37B, which continued west through the town of Louisville on Town Line Road and an unnamed roadway along the St. Lawrence River to NY 37 at Louisville Corner.

The alignments of NY 37B and NY 131 west of the Town Line Road / Maple Street intersection were flipped c. 1962, placing NY 37B on NY 37's former alignment and NY 131 on the riverside highway and Town Line Road. Within two years, NY 131 was realigned again, this time east of Town Line Road, to follow a new road along the river to Barnhart Island Road, where it turned south and followed the highway to its junction with NY 37. A short, 0.10-mile (0.16 km)-long portion of NY 131's former alignment on Town Line Road is still maintained by the New York State Department of Transportation as NY 971J, an unsigned reference route. The remainder of Town Line Road is maintained by St. Lawrence County as County Route 43.

== Major intersections ==
The entire route is in St. Lawrence County.

Location	mi	km	Destinations	Notes
Louisville	0.00	0.00	NY 37 / Great Lakes Seaway Trail	Western terminus
Louisville	6.28	10.11	NY 971J (Town Line Road) – Massena	Former routing of NY 131
Town of Massena	12.45	20.04	NY 37 / Great Lakes Seaway Trail – Massena, Bridge to Canada, Malone	Eastern terminus
1.000 mi = 1.609 km; 1.000 km = 0.621 mi

== See also ==
- List of county routes in St. Lawrence County, New York
