= Massena, New York =

Town of Massena, New York

- Town
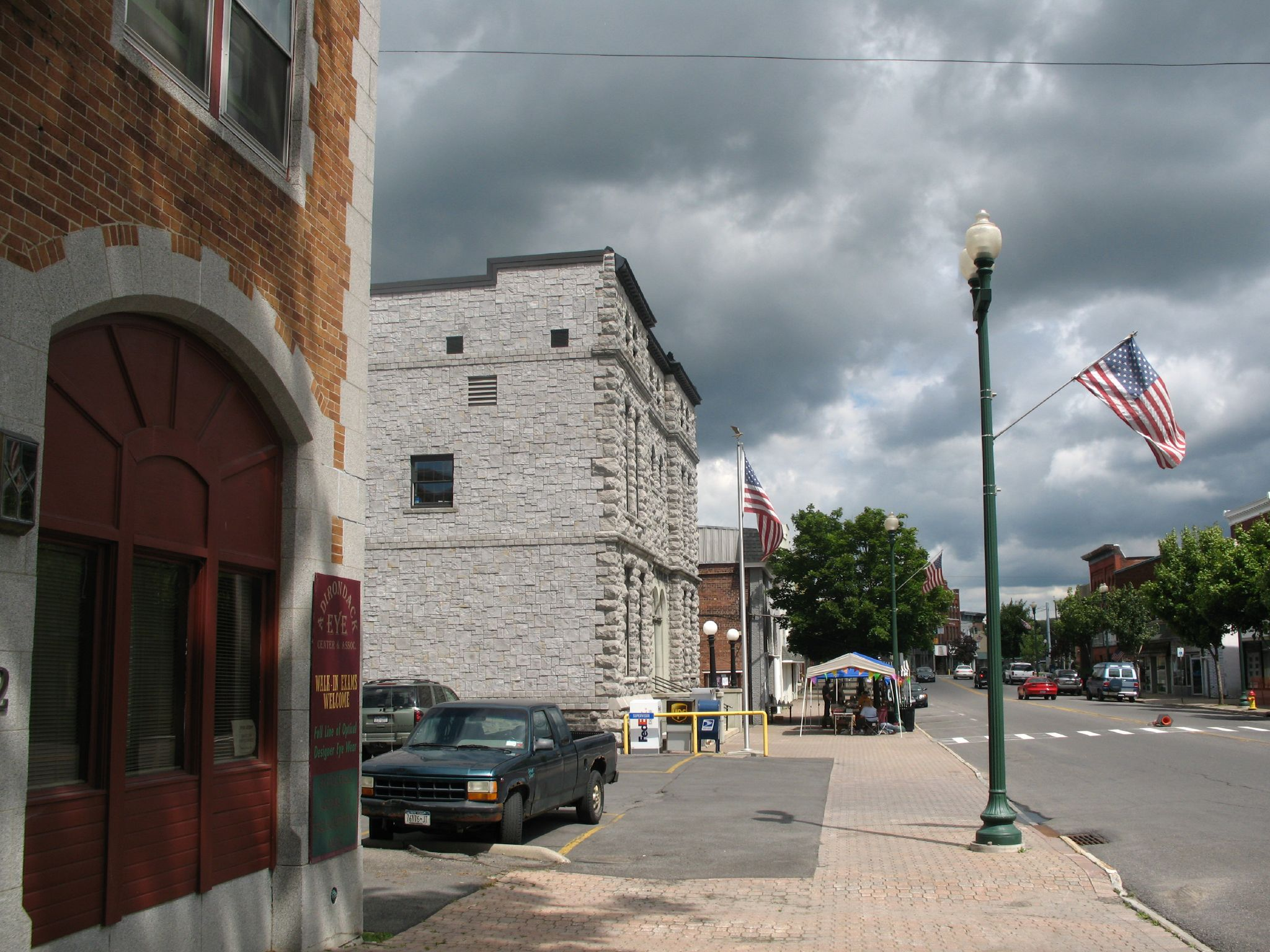
- Massena Town Hall and Farmer’s Market
- Nickname: Gateway to the Fourth Coast
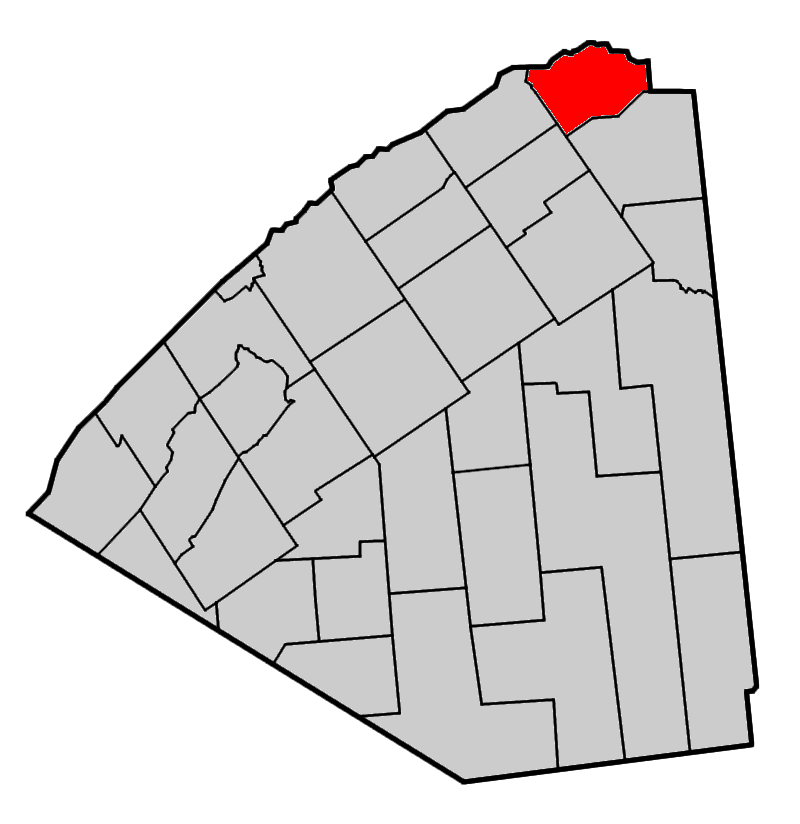
- Map highlighting Massena's location within St. Lawrence County.

- Location within the state of New York
- Coordinates: 44°57′39″N 74°50′02″W
- Country: United States
- State: New York
- County: St. Lawrence
- Incorporated: 1802
- Named for: André Masséna

Government
  - Type: Town council: Adrian Taraska, Kristy Baker, Jared Hollander, Sam Carbone Jr
  - Town supervisor: Ray Lancto
  - Deputy Town Supervisor: Sam Carbone Jr.

Area
  - Total: 56.15 sq mi (145.42 km^{2})
  - Land: 44.34 sq mi (114.85 km^{2})
  - Water: 11.80 sq mi (30.56 km^{2})
- Elevation: 200 ft (61 m)

Population (2020)
  - Total: 12,433
- Time zone: UTC−5 (Eastern (EST))
  - Summer (DST): UTC−4 (EDT)
- ZIP Code: 13662
- Area code: 315
- FIPS code: 36-46030
- GNIS feature ID: "Town of Massena". Geographic Names Information System. United States Geological Survey, United States Department of the Interior.
- Website: massena.us

Massena is a town in St. Lawrence County, New York, United States. It is located along the county's northern border, just south of the St. Lawrence River and the Three Nations Crossing of the Canada–United States border. The population was 12,433 at the time of the 2020 census.

The town of Massena contains a village that is also named Massena.

== History ==
Massena was established in 1792 by Anable Faucher. The settlement was initially called Nikentsiake by the Mohawk Indians, translating to "where the fish live." Massena was one of the first towns settled in St. Lawrence county, but was not incorporated until 1802 when it was formed from the town of Lisbon. The town and its village are named after André Masséna, a general and Marshal to Napoleon during the Napoleonic Wars.

The town boasted the Massena Springs, a pair of sulfur springs, one hot and the other cold, reputed to possess healing powers known to the Native Americans before European settlement. In 1820, an Army veteran, Captain John Polley, hoping to capitalize on the properties, opened a hotel and began to advertise them. By 1858, three hotels, numerous rental cottages, a bathing house, and a plant that bottled and sold the spring water, had been built. By about 1900, the Springs' status as a popular resort had faded.

Up until the 1880s, the town was predominantly agricultural, mainly home to butter and cheese production. The first small mills were built in the 1830s, harnessing the Grasse River to turn their wheels. They included a saw mill, stone-cutter, and a tannery. In 1833, New York State Legislature approved a canal that would bypass a troublesome rapids hindering navigation on the St. Lawrence by linking the Grasse and St. Lawrence Rivers. However, the British North American government preempted this project by building the Cornwall Canal on the Canadian side of the River, completed in 1843.

The Massena Canal project was revived at the end of the century and completed in 1898, finally connecting the Grasse River and St. Lawrence River. A powerhouse built in 1900 provided hydroelectric power to the town. The new canal attracted the Pittsburgh Reduction Company (later Alcoa). This influx of industry workers transformed former health retreat hotels into housing for the burgeoning workforce. The Massena Power Canal was closed in 1958.

In 1928 the town was the scene of the antisemitic Massena blood libel. The town's Jews were falsely accused of kidnapping and ritual murder of a girl.

In the 1950s, the New York Power Authority was established, leading to the creation of the St. Lawrence-Franklin D. Roosevelt Power Project. Spanning the St. Lawrence River, the hydropower plant was capable of generating over 900,000 kilowatts of electricity. Simultaneously, the 1950s witnessed the development of the St. Lawrence Seaway, a monumental American-Canadian navigational project. This system of locks and gates facilitated the movement of boats through the river, connecting the Great Lakes to the Atlantic Ocean. With the completion of the Seaway and Power Project, Massena experienced a significant expansion at the Alcoa plant, solidifying its status as the oldest continuously operating aluminum production facility in the Western Hemisphere.

The 1980s saw the establishment of the St. Lawrence Centre Mall and St. Lawrence strip mall complex, fostering a regional retail hub, attracting Canadian shoppers.

The town suffered natural disasters in the 1944 Cornwall-Massena earthquake and in the January 1998 North American ice storm.

== Geography ==
Massena is located just south of the St. Lawrence River, and the Grasse and Racquette rivers pass through town.

=== Communities and locations in Massena ===
- Barnhardt Island – An island in the St. Lawrence River northeast of Massena village. The island is at the international border and is the northernmost point of land in New York.
- Long Sault Island ("Isle au Long Saut") – An island in the St. Lawrence River north of Massena village.
- Massena – A village at the western town line on both banks of the Grasse River.
- Massena Center – A hamlet northeast of Massena village.
- Massena Power Canal – A waterway connecting the Grasse River to the St. Lawrence River.
- Massena Springs – A hamlet south of Massena village by the Raquette River. The community was the site of health resorts and hotels based on sulphurous spring water.
- Raquette River – A hamlet east of Massena village by the Raquette River. It was first settled circa 1804.
- Robert Moses State Park – A state park in the northern part of the town.
- Rooseveltown – A hamlet near the eastern town line by the Raquette River.
- Wiley Dondero Canal – A waterway constructed as part of the St. Lawrence power project.

=== Climate ===
Massena has a humid continental climate (Köppen: Dfb).

Climate data for Massena, New York (Massena International Airport) (1991–2020 normals, extremes 1948–present)
Month	Jan	Feb	Mar	Apr	May	Jun	Jul	Aug	Sep	Oct	Nov	Dec	Year
Record high °F (°C)	67 (19)	63 (17)	84 (29)	89 (32)	96 (36)	97 (36)	99 (37)	100 (38)	95 (35)	87 (31)	78 (26)	68 (20)	100 (38)
Mean maximum °F (°C)	50.9 (10.5)	48.6 (9.2)	61.7 (16.5)	77.1 (25.1)	86.6 (30.3)	89.3 (31.8)	90.2 (32.3)	89.6 (32.0)	86.2 (30.1)	77.0 (25.0)	66.2 (19.0)	54.2 (12.3)	92.4 (33.6)
Mean daily maximum °F (°C)	25.4 (−3.7)	28.2 (−2.1)	38.2 (3.4)	53.7 (12.1)	67.9 (19.9)	76.2 (24.6)	80.8 (27.1)	78.9 (26.1)	71.2 (21.8)	57.5 (14.2)	44.6 (7.0)	32.1 (0.1)	54.6 (12.6)
Daily mean °F (°C)	15.6 (−9.1)	17.8 (−7.9)	28.5 (−1.9)	42.9 (6.1)	55.9 (13.3)	64.8 (18.2)	69.5 (20.8)	67.5 (19.7)	59.5 (15.3)	47.5 (8.6)	35.8 (2.1)	23.8 (−4.6)	44.1 (6.7)
Mean daily minimum °F (°C)	5.9 (−14.5)	7.3 (−13.7)	18.7 (−7.4)	32.2 (0.1)	43.9 (6.6)	53.4 (11.9)	58.2 (14.6)	56.2 (13.4)	47.8 (8.8)	37.4 (3.0)	26.9 (−2.8)	15.5 (−9.2)	33.6 (0.9)
Mean minimum °F (°C)	−20.0 (−28.9)	−16.2 (−26.8)	−4.8 (−20.4)	18.8 (−7.3)	29.8 (−1.2)	40.3 (4.6)	47.7 (8.7)	43.6 (6.4)	32.7 (0.4)	22.7 (−5.2)	9.6 (−12.4)	−9.6 (−23.1)	−22.7 (−30.4)
Record low °F (°C)	−44 (−42)	−38 (−39)	−26 (−32)	6 (−14)	20 (−7)	31 (−1)	38 (3)	35 (2)	24 (−4)	15 (−9)	−9 (−23)	−33 (−36)	−44 (−42)
Average precipitation inches (mm)	2.11 (54)	1.58 (40)	2.04 (52)	2.91 (74)	3.14 (80)	3.71 (94)	3.46 (88)	3.36 (85)	3.50 (89)	3.43 (87)	2.59 (66)	2.09 (53)	33.92 (862)
Average precipitation days (≥ 0.01 in)	13.4	10.3	11.9	12.5	12.4	12.7	11.6	10.9	11.3	12.4	12.6	13.6	145.6
Source: NOAA

== Demographics ==
Historical population
Census	Pop.	Note	%±
1820	944		—
1830	2,070		119.3%
1840	2,726		31.7%
1850	2,870		5.3%
1860	2,925		1.9%
1870	2,560		−12.5%
1880	2,739		7.0%
1890	2,740		0.0%
1900	3,904		42.5%
1910	4,806		23.1%
1920	8,975		86.7%
1930	12,029		34.0%
1940	12,979		7.9%
1950	17,937		38.2%
1960	21,346		19.0%
1970	16,021		−24.9%
1980	14,856		−7.3%
1990	13,826		−6.9%
2000	13,121		−5.1%
2010	12,883		−1.8%
2020	12,433		−3.5%
2025 (est.)	12,058		−3.0%
U.S. Decennial Census

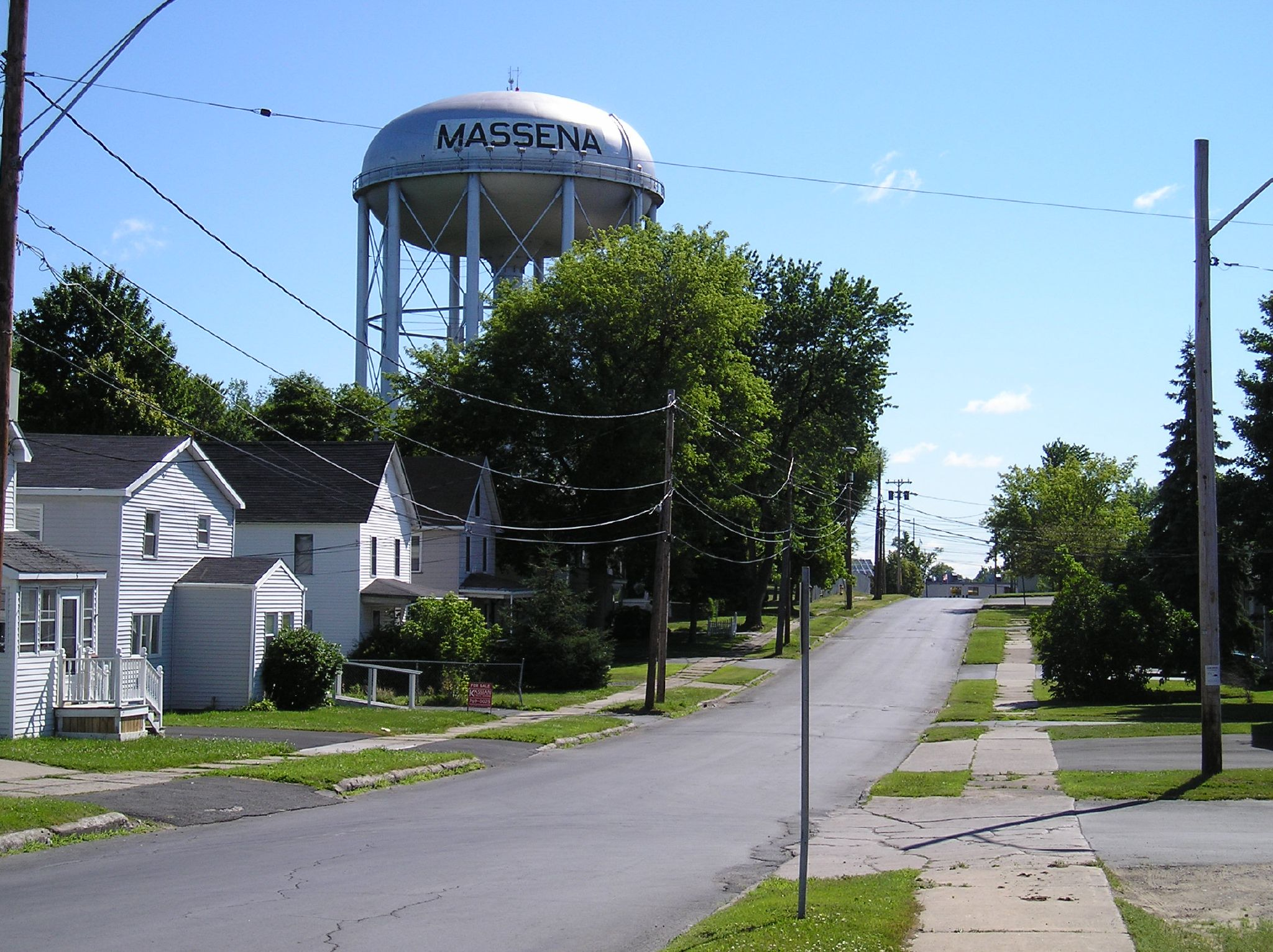
The town's water tower.

By 2010 industrial employment had declined and there were 12,883 people in the town, down from 16,021 in 1970.

As of the census of 2000, there were 13,121 people, 2,510 households, and 3,454 families residing in the town. The population density was 293.7 inhabitants per square mile (113.4/km^{2}). There were 5,880 housing units at an average density of 131.6 units per square mile (50.8 units/km^{2}). The town's racial makeup was 96.80% White, 0.30% Black or African American, 1.25% Native American, 0.41% Asian, 0.03% Pacific Islander, 0.18% from other races, and .02% from two or more races. Hispanic or Latino of any race were 0.83% of the population.

There were 5,510 households, of which 39.4% had children under the age of 18 living with them, 36.1% were married couples living together, 12.2% had a female householder with no husband present, and 37.3% were non-families. 31.1% of all households were made up of individuals, and 13.9% had someone living alone who was 65 years of age or older. The average household size was 2.98 and the average family size was 3.67.

The median age is 42.6 years, compared with the U.S. median of 39.4 years. In the town, the population was spread out, with 23.7% under the age of 18, 7.1% from 18 to 24, 27.3% from 25 to 44, 23.2% from 45 to 64, and 18.8% who were 65 years of age or older. The median age was 36 years. For every 100 females, there were 88.6 males. For every 100 females age 18 and over, there were 84.7 males.

The town has a median household income of $58,391, compared with the U.S. median of $87,460. The median family income was $62,696. Males had a median income of $48,484 versus $46,819 for females. The per capita income was $25,111. About 6.9% of families and 8.9% of the population were below the poverty line, including 15.4% of those under age 18 and 1.8% of those age 65 or over.

== Economy ==
The modern town's economy is centered on power production, the commerce of the St. Lawrence Seaway, and an Alcoa Aluminum plant, the world's longest continually operating aluminum facility. Alcoa employs over 600 people at its facilities in Massena.

The New York Power Authority now operates a hydroelectric power generating dam, the St. Lawrence-FDR Power Project, on the St. Lawrence River adjacent to Massena. Curran Renewable Energy manufactures wood pellet fuel and mulch in the town. Massena is also home to the Eisenhower and Snell Locks, part of the St. Lawrence Seaway which allows ships and vessels to pass through the St. Lawrence River and on to the Great Lakes.

While on November 2, 2015, Alcoa announced the idling of the smelter at its "Alcoa West" plant, the facility remained open through negotiations with New York State, and 400 jobs were saved until 2019. The Forgings and Extrusions facilities at Alcoa West were unaffected. The changes resulted in the loss of 487 jobs.

It was estimated in 2013 that nearly 30% of Massena residents live below the poverty line. St. Lawrence County's poverty rate is higher than both the state and federal rates and ranks the 5th highest in New York State.

== Education ==
Both the entire village, and almost all of the town of Massena are served by the Massena Central School District, which also serves most of the Town of Louisville, and portions of Norfolk and Brasher towns. Additionally, it contains a portion of the Akwesasne census-designated place, and the St. Regis Mohawk Reservation.

- Jefferson Elementary School (K-6)
- Madison Elementary School (K-6)
- Nightengale Elementary School (K-6)
- J. William Leary Junior High School (7–8)
- Massena Central High School (9–12)
- Trinity Catholic School (K-6)
- Holy Name of Jesus Academy (K-12)

== Media ==
=== Radio ===
- 1340 WMSA
- WVLF-FM Mix 96.1
- WRCD-FM 101.5 The Fox
- WYBG – AM 1050 (defunct as of June 30, 2015)

=== Filming location ===
For Ellen, released in 2012, was filmed in Massena and the surrounding area.

== Infrastructure ==
=== Road ===
New York State Route 37 – a northeast–southwest highway – passes along the outskirts of the town.

=== Aviation ===
The town is served by Massena International Airport, east of Massena village, south of NY-37.

=== Bus ===
Trailways of New York provides bus service from Massena to Syracuse.

=== Rail ===
The town had until 1961 been the terminus for New York Central Railroad (NYC) sleeping car passenger service on its St. Lawrence Division; the last sleepers came in from the NYC's Iroquois and the outgoing sleeper fed into the New York Special. The final run of regular local trains into the town was in 1964.

== Notable people ==
- Avery D. Andrews, brigadier general in the United States Army
- William G. Bissell, Wisconsin State Senator, merchant, salesman and farmer, was born in Massena.
- Stephanie Bissonnette, dancer and choreographer known for her role in the original Broadway production of the musical Mean Girls
- Aaron Bogosian, former American Hockey League player
- Zach Bogosian, National Hockey League player on the Minnesota Wild
- Gary Danko, chef
- Jim Deshaies, former Major League Baseball player, television color analyst
- Follett Johnson, Medal of Honor recipient
- Mike Hurlbut, retired professional hockey player, collegiate ice hockey coach
- Bid McPhee, former Major League Baseball player and member of the Baseball Hall of Fame
- Horace N. Polley, Wisconsin State Assemblyman and farmer, was born in Massena
- Myron Reed, Wisconsin State Senator and lawyer, was born in Massena.
- Joel Rosenbaum (born 1933), cell biologist, was born in Massena
- Hal Smith, actor

== See also ==
- André Masséna, Napoleonic general.
- Massena, Iowa, another community, named after Massena, NY
