= KMSS =

KMSS may refer to:

- KMSS-TV, a television station (channel 33 analog/34 digital) licensed to Shreveport, Louisiana, United States
- Massena International Airport in Massena, New York, United States
