= Montreal Subdivision =

Montreal Subdivision refers to the following rail lines:

- Montreal Subdivision (CN), part of the Grand Trunk Railway
- Montreal Subdivision (CSX Transportation), a railroad line owned by the St. Lawrence and Adirondack Railway and Canadian National
