= New York State Route 37B =

East–west state highway located in St. Lawrence County, New York

New York State Route 37B
- Map of the Massena area with NY 37B highlighted in red

Route information
- Auxiliary route of NY 37
- Maintained by NYSDOT
- Length: 4.03 mi (6.49 km)
- Existed: 1930–present

Major junctions
- West end: NY 37 in Louisville
- East end: NY 37 in Massena

Location
- Country: United States
- State: New York
- Counties: St. Lawrence

Highway system
- New York Highways; Interstate; US; State; Reference; Parkways
← NY 37	→ NY 37C

New York State Route 37B (NY 37B) is an east–west state highway located in St. Lawrence County, New York, in the United States. It serves as a business route of NY 37 through the village of Massena. While NY 37B enters the village, NY 37 bypasses it to the south. The western terminus of the route is at an intersection with NY 37 in the town of Louisville. Its eastern terminus is at a junction with NY 37 just east of the village limits in the town of Massena. NY 37B intersects North Main Street, a state-maintained northward extension of NY 420, in Massena's central district.

The origins of NY 37B date back to the early 20th century when the New York State Legislature created Route 32, an unsigned legislative route extending from North Lawrence to Ogdensburg via Massena. From Waddington to Massena, Route 32 followed River Road and Town Line Road. This portion of the route became part of NY 3 in 1924. In the 1930 renumbering of state highways in New York, the Waddington–Massena segment of NY 3 became NY 37B. The route was extended east into Massena in the 1950s after NY 37 was realigned to follow a new bypass around the village.

Most of NY 37B west of Massena ran through a low-lying area along the St. Lawrence River. In 1958, this area was permanently indundated as part of the St. Lawrence Seaway's construction. As a result, NY 37B was rerouted to follow a new roadway along the fringe of Lake St. Lawrence to meet NY 37 in Louisville Corner. A connector between NY 37 and NY 37B in Louisville was designated as NY 131 by 1960. The alignments of NY 37B and NY 131 west of Massena were swapped c. 1962, placing NY 37B on its modern alignment.

== Route description ==
NY 37B begins at an intersection with its parent route, NY 37, in the town of Louisville. The route heads to the northeast, paralleling the Grasse River as it passes a small number of homes and businesses located in the otherwise rural town. There are small patches of forested areas along the way to the Massena village line (and the town's line of the same name), where it intersects with Town Line Road (County Route 43). Once in Massena, the amount of development along the highway begins to increase. NY 37B, now known as Maple Street, continues northeast through Massena for three blocks before veering eastward upon passing Massena Memorial Hospital.

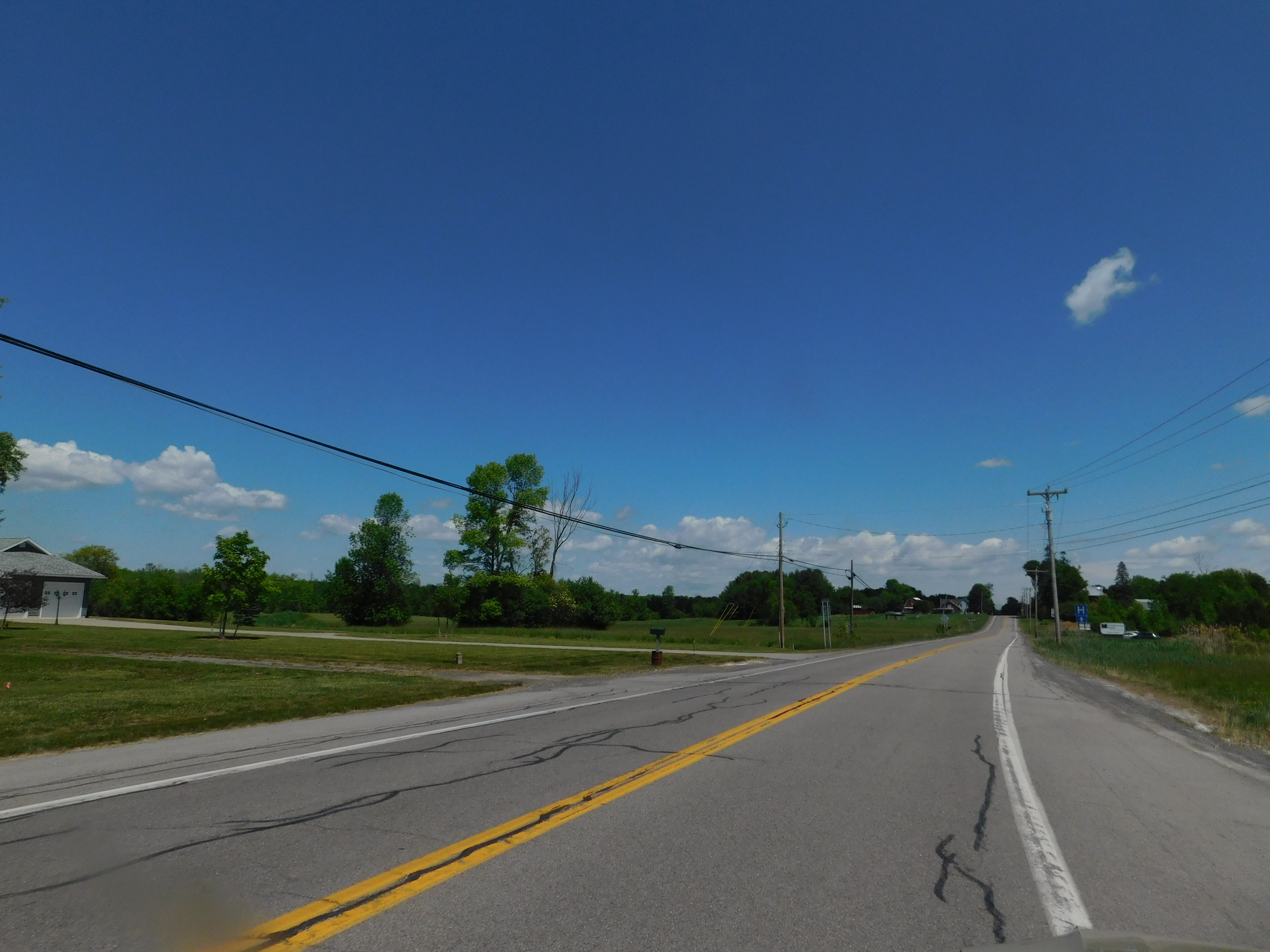
NY 37B heading away from NY 37 in Louisville

In the center of Massena, NY 37B intersects North Main Street, which connects to NY 420 south of the village. The portion of Main Street between NY 420 and NY 37B is maintained by the New York State Department of Transportation as NY 970B, an unsigned reference route. Past North Main Street, NY 37B follows Maple Street southeast to Center Street. The route merges with Center Street and becomes a divided highway as it connects to Willow Street by way of an interchange and intersects an eastward extension of Center Street.

NY 37B turns south at the interchange, becoming Parker Avenue and crossing over the Grasse River to meet East Orvis Street on the southern riverbank. Here, the route turns east to follow East Orvis Street northeastward through the residential and commercial areas that comprise southeastern Massena. At the Massena village line, East Orvis Street becomes Highland Road, a name NY 37B retains for a short distance eastward to a junction with NY 37 (St. Regis Boulevard). Although Highland Road continues through the intersection, NY 37B ends at the junction.

== History ==
In 1908, the New York State Legislature created Route 32, an unsigned legislative route extending from North Lawrence to Ogdensburg via Winthrop and Massena. It entered Massena on what is now NY 420 and followed Main Street and Maple Street through the village. West of Massena, the highway was routed on Town Line Road and River Road to a junction east of Waddington, where Route 32 continued west on modern NY 37 to Waddington. When state highways in New York were first posted in 1924, the portion of Route 32 between Waddington and Massena became part of NY 3, a highway extending across the width of the state.

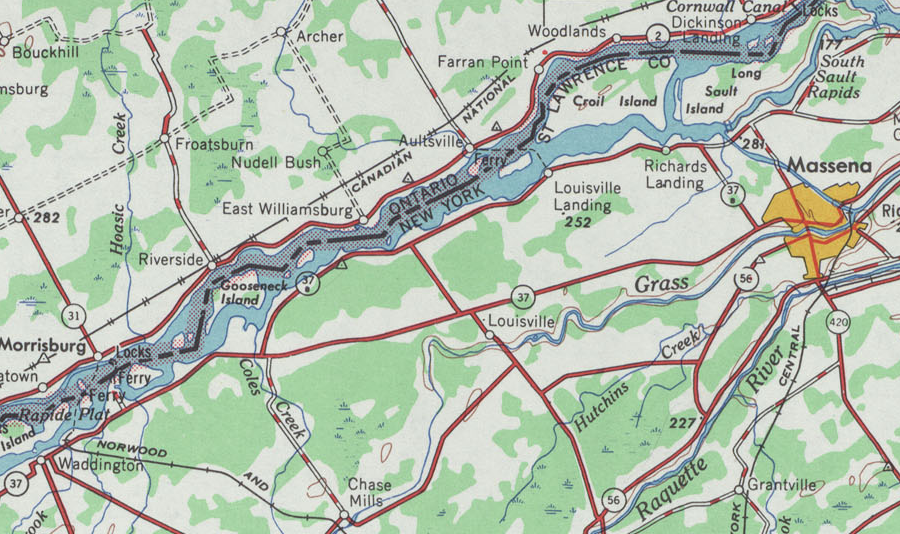
A 1951 USGS topographic map depicting NY 37B's original alignment

The segment of NY 3 east of Watertown was rerouted as part of the 1930 renumbering of state highways in New York to largely follow its modern alignment between Watertown and Plattsburgh. Most of NY 3's former alignment along the St. Lawrence River from Alexandria Bay to Hogansburg became part of the new NY 37; however, from Waddington to Massena, NY 37 used a more inland routing. As a result, the former routing of NY 3 between the two villages became NY 37B instead. In the mid-to-late 1950s, NY 37 was rerouted to follow a new bypass around the southern edge of Massena. Following its completion, NY 37B was extended eastward along NY 37's former routing on Maple Street, Parker Avenue, and Orvis Street to meet the bypass east of the village.

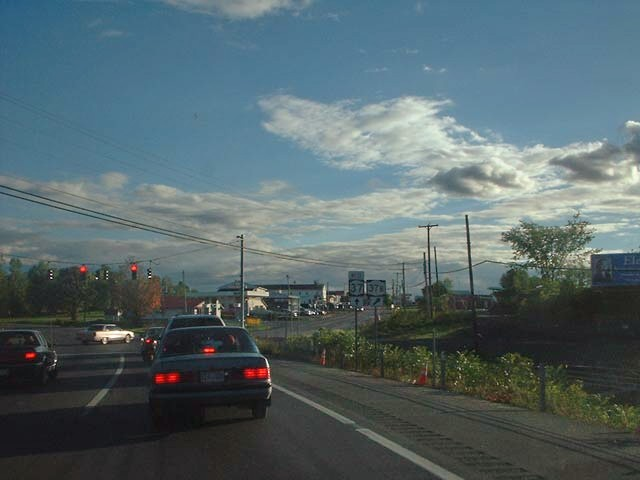
NY 37B's eastern terminus at the NY 37 bypass just east of Massena

In the 1950s, construction began on the St. Lawrence Seaway, a system of canals and locks that would make the St. Lawrence River suitable for shipping. As part of the seaway's construction, a low-lying area in Ontario and New York between Waddington, New York, and Cornwall, Ontario, would be inundated with water in order to create a navigable channel through the Long Sault rapids and to allow hydroelectric stations to be established immediately upriver from Massena and Cornwall. Much of NY 37B was located within the flood-prone region due to its proximity to the river. On July 1, 1958, the intentional flooding was carried out via the destruction of a cofferdam upstream, creating what is now known as Lake St. Lawrence and inundating the majority of NY 37B west of Massena.

Following the destruction of the majority of NY 37B, the route was realigned west of Massena to follow a new riverside roadway to the hamlet of Louisville Corner, where it came to an end at NY 37. The remainder of NY 37B along the Massena–Louisville town line road and in Massena was unchanged. By 1960, a connector between NY 37 in Louisville and NY 37B and Massena utilizing NY 37's former routing west of the village was designated as NY 131. The alignments of NY 37B and NY 131 west of the Maple Street / Town Line Road intersection were flipped c. 1962, placing NY 131 on the riverside and town line roads and NY 37B on NY 37's former routing into Massena.

== Major intersections ==
The entire route is in St. Lawrence County.

Location	mi	km	Destinations	Notes
Louisville	0.00	0.00	NY 37 to NY 56 – Malone, Ogdensburg	Western terminus
Village of Massena	2.33	3.75	NY 970B (North Main Street) – Business District	Former northern terminus of NY 420; northern terminus of NY 970B
Town of Massena	4.03	6.49	NY 37 (St. Regis Boulevard)	Eastern terminus
1.000 mi = 1.609 km; 1.000 km = 0.621 mi
