= Massena Central High School =

- Red Raiders "Spartan" logo adopted 2018

Location
- 84 Nightengale Ave; Massena, New York 13662; United States; 44.921999°N 74.89749°W

Information
- Established: 1937
- School district: Massena Central School District
- Superintendent: Ronald P. Burke
- Principal: Alan Oliver
- Staff: 53.79 (FTE)
- Grades: 9–12
- Student to teacher ratio: 14.82
- Color
- Website: https://www.mcs.k12.ny.us/

Massena Central High School is a four-year public high school located in Massena, New York, for students in grades 9 through 12. It is one of five schools, and the only high school, in the Massena Central School District.

The school district includes the entire Village of Massena, plus a portion of the Akwesasne census-designated place. The district includes most of the towns of Massena and Louisville, and parts of the towns of Norfolk and Brasher. In 2003 some children from the Canadian portion of Akwesasne attended high school at Massena Central.

== Notable alumni ==
- Zach Bogosian – Defenseman in the NHL for the Tampa Bay Lightning
