= Massena Central School District =

School district in New York, United States

Massena Central School District is a school district headquartered in Massena Village, Massena Town, New York.

Located in St. Lawrence County, the district includes Massena Village and a piece of the Akwesasne census-designated place. This means the district covers portions of the Akwesasne Native American reservation. In regards to towns, the district covers the majority of Massena and Louisville towns, as well as portions of the towns of Brasher and Norfolk.

== History ==
The Massena Central School District was established in 1937 as a centralized K-12 system, coinciding with the opening of Massena Central High School for grades 9–12, to serve a rapidly growing industrial community along the St. Lawrence River driven by the Aluminum Company of America (Alcoa) smelter founded in 1902, and later hydroelectric projects of the New York Power Authority.

By the mid-20th century, the district expanded to a full K-12 structure that included three neighborhood elementary schools (Nightengale, Madison, and Jefferson) and J. William Leary Junior High School for grades 7–8, accommodating enrollment increases tied to post-World War II growth and the construction of the St. Lawrence Seaway in the 1950s.

Throughout its history, the district has maintained strong partnerships with local industries such as Alcoa, Arconic, General Motors Powertrain, and the New York Power Authority, partnerships that have funded vocational programs and facility improvements for a diverse student body that includes significant Mohawk enrollment from the Akwesasne reservation.

In 2003, students from the Canadian portion of Akwesasne attended Massena Central High School, reflecting continued cross-border educational cooperation.

Patrick H. Brady served as superintendent until his retirement on July 1, 2023; in May 2023 the board of education selected Ronald P. Burke as the new superintendent effective August 1, 2023, with Brady remaining as interim during the transition.

== Schools ==
Secondary schools

- Massena Central High School
- J.W. Leary Junior High School

Elementary schools

- Jefferson Elementary School
- Madison Elementary School
- Nightengale Elementary School
