= Robinson Bay Archeological District =

Historic district in New York, United States

- U.S. National Register of Historic Places
- U.S. Historic district
- Nearest city: Massena, New York, U.S.
- Area: 100 acres (40 ha)
- NRHP reference No.: 77001524
- Added to NRHP: September 13, 1977

Robinson Bay Archeological District is a national historic district and archaeological site located near Massena in St. Lawrence County, New York.

It was listed on the National Register of Historic Places in 1977.
