= Croil Island =

Island in New York, United States

- Location within New York

Geography
- Location: St. Lawrence River
- Coordinates: 44°58′23″N 74°58′44″W
- Area: 796 acres (322 ha)
- Highest elevation: 299 ft (91.1 m)

Administration
- United States
- State: New York
- County: St. Lawrence
- Town: Louisville

Croil Island is a 796-acre (3.22 km^{2}) uninhabited island on the St. Lawrence River in the Town of Louisville in St. Lawrence County, New York, United States. The island is currently occupied by the undeveloped Croil Island State Park.

== History ==
The island was considered British territory prior to 1818, at which time ownership was officially transferred to the United States.

Croil Island is named for a Scottish family that farmed upon the island in the mid-1800s. Prior to the purchase of the island in 1835 by William Croil, the island was known as Stacey Island.

A land claim brought by the St. Regis Mohawk Tribe in the early 1980s sought to reclaim Croil Island and additional lands in northern New York. A 2013 ruling by the U.S. District Court for the Northern District of New York dismissed the tribe's claim to the island, but upheld some of their claims elsewhere.

Croil Island has been alternately known as Baxter Island, Grand Eddy Island, Ile au Chamailles, Stacey Island, Tsiiowenokwakarate, and Upper Sault Island. The island has historically been home to several large farms, but no concentrated settlements.

== Croil Island State Park ==
Croil Island today hosts Croil Island State Park, an undeveloped state park maintained by the New York State Office of Parks, Recreation and Historic Preservation and owned by the New York Power Authority. The island is popular with outdoor enthusiasts, although problems with littering and illegal camping led to warning signs being posted on the island in 2011.

== See also ==
- List of New York state parks
