= Horace N. Polley =

American politician

- Born: March 10, 1842; Massena, New York, United States
- Died: September 18, 1914 (aged 72); Eau Claire County, Wisconsin, U.S
- Occupations: Farmer, musician, stonemason, politician

Horace Newton Polley (March 10, 1842 – September 18, 1914) was a farmer, musician, stonemason, and politician.

Born in Massena, New York, St. Lawrence County, New York, Polley moved with his parents to West Point, Wisconsin, Columbia County, Wisconsin and settled on a farm. He was a farmer and a stonemason. In 1858, he went back to St. Lawrence County, New York but returned to West Point, Wisconsin in 1861. During the American Civil War, Polley served in the 11th Wisconsin Volunteer Infantry Regiment and was a musician and later served as principal musician. In 1866, Polley moved to the Town of Bridge Creek, Wisconsin, Eau Claire, Wisconsin. Polley was the assessor for the Town of Bridge Creek and was a Republican. From 1897 to 1901, Polley served in the Wisconsin State Assembly. Polley ran unsuccessfully for Eau Claire County assessor in 1907. He moved to Trempealeau County, Wisconsin and then moved back to Eau Claire County, Wisconsin, where he died.
