= Massena blood libel =

1928 blood libel against Jews in New York, US

The Massena blood libel was an instance of blood libel against Jews in which the Jews of Massena, New York, were falsely accused of the kidnapping and ritual murder of a Christian girl in September 1928.

On September 22, 1928, two days before Yom Kippur, four-year-old Barbara Griffiths went for a walk and did not come back home. After a long search by townspeople and New York State Police, a rumor began to circulate that the girl had been kidnapped and killed by the town's Jews for a religious ritual associated with the impending holiday.

The following day, the state police questioned Morris Goldberg, a Jew. Goldberg left police with the impression that there might be some truth to the rumors that Jews engaged in ritual murder.

At that point, the state police sought to interrogate Rabbi Berel Brennglass, leader of the town's Adath Israel synagogue. When asked about the allegations of ritual murder, Brennglass told the police and the town's mayor, who was present, that they should be ashamed for asking such questions. He expressed outrage that people believed such lies in the United States in the 20th century.

Barbara Griffiths was found in the woods later that afternoon roughly a mile from her home. She told authorities she had become lost during her walk and slept in the forest. Nevertheless, some citizens of Massena continued to believe that Griffiths had been kidnapped by the Jews. They attributed her safe return to the discovery of the Jews' plot. The mayor may have led a boycott of businesses owned by Jews.

The Massena blood libel drew national attention. Through the efforts of Rabbi Brennglass, the American Jewish Committee and the American Jewish Congress denounced the town's leaders, prompting apologies from the mayor and the state police to the rabbi, the town's Jews, and all Jews of the United States. In his apology, the mayor wrote:

In light of the solemn protest of my Jewish neighbors, I feel I ought to express clearly and unequivocally ... my sincere regret that by any act of commission or omission, I should have seemed to lend countenance ... to what I should have known to be a cruel libel imputing human sacrifice as a practice now or at any time in the history of the Jewish people.

The Blood Lie, a novel about the incident by Shirley Reva Vernick (ISBN 978-1933693842), was published in 2011 by Cinco Puntos Press. Hundreds of copies of the book were distributed in Massena, and it was incorporated into the local school curriculum.
