= Massena Canal =

Coordinates: 44.950051°N 74.899515°W

The Massena Power Canal, which connects the Saint Lawrence River to the lower Grass River.

In 1833 the New York State Legislature chartered a canal to bypass a troublesome rapids hindering navigation on the St. Lawrence by linking the Grasse and St. Lawrence rivers, however, the British Empire preempted the project by building the Cornwall Canal on the Canadian side of the River, completed in 1843. The Massena Canal project was revived at the end of the century, and the canal was completed in 1898.

A powerhouse were built in the early 1900s to provide hydroelectric power to the local community of Massena, New York. It is located in Massena, New York, St Lawrence County. The Power Canal closed in 1958, when the Eisenhower locks system and Moses-Saunders Power Dam (FDR project) on the St. Lawrence River was completed.
