= WMSA =

Radio station in Massena, New York

- Massena, New York; United States
- Frequency: 1340 kHz

Programming
- Format: Talk and oldies
- Affiliations: ABC News Radio; CBS News Radio; Premiere Networks; Westwood One

Ownership
- Owner: Stephens Media Group; (Stephens Media Group Massena, LLC)
- Sister stations: WRCD; WVLF

History
- First air date: October 12, 1945; 80 years ago
- Call sign meaning: Massena

Technical information
- Licensing authority: FCC
- Facility ID: 97
- Class: C
- Power: 910 watts
- Transmitter coordinates: 44°54′11.2″N 74°53′0.7″W
- Translator: 92.9 W225DE (Massena)

Links
- Public license information: Public file; LMS
- Webcast: Listen live
- Website: www.1340wmsa.com

WMSA (1340 AM) is a commercial radio station broadcasting a radio format of talk and oldies, with local news updates. Licensed to Massena, New York, the station is owned by the Stephens Media Group.

WMSA transmits with 910 watts around the clock. It uses a non-directional antenna.

== History ==
WMSA is one of the oldest stations in the North Country. It signed on the air at 2 p.m. on October 12, 1945.

The station was previously owned by Martz Communications Group, and was acquired by Stephens as of February 1, 2008.

Logo before tramslator sign on

== Translators ==
A translator, W225DE (92.9 Massena), was turned on in late July 2021.

Call sign	Frequency	City of license	FID	ERP (W)	Class	FCC info
W225DE	92.9 FM	Massena, New York	199998	250	D	LMS
