= WVLF =

Radio station in Norwood, New York

- Norwood, New York; United States
- Broadcast area: Massena, New York; Cornwall, Ontario
- Frequency: 96.1 MHz
- Branding: Mix 96.1

Programming
- Format: Adult contemporary
- Affiliations: Premiere Radio Networks

Ownership
- Owner: Stephens Media Group; (Stephens Media Group Massena, LLC)
- Sister stations: WMSA; WRCD

History
- First air date: 2001
- Former call signs: WAZV (1998–2001, CP)
- Call sign meaning: "Valley FM"

Technical information
- Licensing authority: FCC
- Facility ID: 60470
- Class: C3
- ERP: 25,000 watts
- HAAT: 100 meters (330 ft)
- Transmitter coordinates: 44°54′11.2″N 74°53′0.7″W

Links
- Public license information: Public file; LMS
- Webcast: Listen live
- Website: www.mymix961.com

WVLF (96.1 FM) is a radio station broadcasting a mix of adult contemporary and hot adult contemporary format. Licensed to Norwood, New York, United States, the station is owned by Stephens Media Group.

The station was previously owned by Martz Communications Group, and was acquired by Stephens as of February 1, 2008.

Following a weekend of a repeating loop of announcements airing the weekend of July 6, 2008, WVLF became "The Valley's New Mix 96.1," beginning at 6AM on Monday, July 7, 2008. The station now airs a Bright Adult Contemporary format covering St. Lawrence County, New York, and Cornwall, Ontario, including the United Counties of Stormont, Dundas and Glengarry.
