= St. Lawrence Centre =

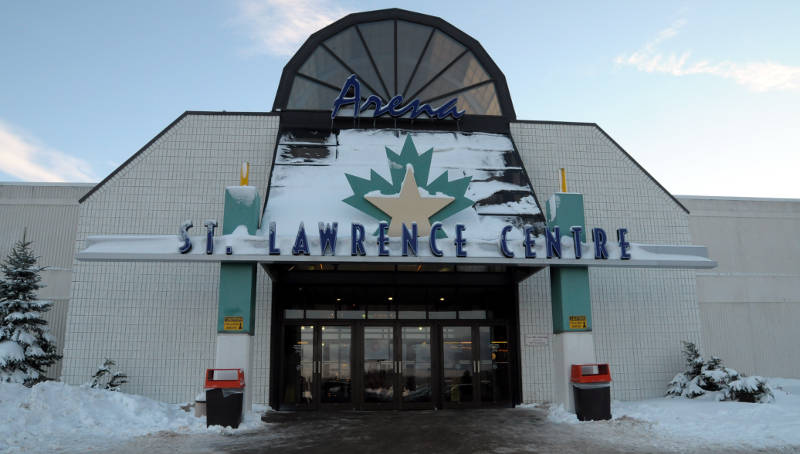
- Main entrance, 2017
- Location: Massena, New York, United States
- Coordinates: 44.948824°N 74.841013°W
- Address: 6100 St. Lawrence Centre
- Opened: 1990
- Closed: April 30, 2024
- Developer: Heritage Company
- Manager: Erica Leonard
- Owner: Shapiro Group
- Num. of stores: 9
- Num. of anchor tenants: 1
- Floor area: 548,612 square feet (50,968 m^{2})
- Floors: 1
- Parking: 500

St. Lawrence Centre was a shopping mall in Massena, New York, United States. It includes one anchor store, JCPenney.

== History ==
The mall was built in 1990 by the Heritage Company. At that time the Massena economy could support it, with a strong manufacturing base built around several local Alcoa plants and heavy cross-border shopping by Canadians from the area of Cornwall, Ontario, just across the St. Lawrence River. The cost of construction was $50 million. In 1995 it was sold to AP Massena Partners. During this time the mall went through serious financial troubles, falling to just a 75% occupancy rate. In September 2003, the mall was sold for $3.6 million to the Carlyle Development Group who hired General Growth Properties to manage it beginning February 2004.

One anchor, originally occupied by Hills until 1998, Ames until 2002 and Steve & Barry's from 2007 to 2008, is vacant. Before Steve & Barry's opened, the town of Massena had attempted to use eminent domain to replace the Hills/Ames with a Wal-Mart in 2006. In 2009, the mall owners circulated a petition to replace the former Hills/Ames/Steve & Barry's building with a Target.

Several tenants moved out of the mall in 2011 and 2012, including original anchor store TJ Maxx. Sears closed its store at the mall in 2014 and was replaced with Sears Hometown Store but closed in 2017. The mall's ice rink closed in August 2016 due to mechanical problems and reopened as a multi-use sports arena.

After Payless ShoeSource closed its store in the mall in spring 2017, many residents of the Massena area, where the Alcoa now only runs one of its former plants and Canadians no longer come in their former numbers, believed the mall was now dead and called for it to be closed and demolished. Erica Leonard, the mall's director, hired by a group of Canadian investors who bought the mall around that time and made immediate physical improvements, went on a local radio station to urge people to stop being so negative and seeing the mall's decline as irreversible. "I just stopped listening to them," she later told The New York Times.

Leonard began to find local businesses to fill the spaces vacated by national retailers, and made it clear to those engaging in criminal activity on the premises that they were not welcome. New tenants have included North Country Showcase, a local company which sells products by local artists; an event planner; a specialty popcorn store run by a local member of the Mohawk Native American tribe, and other local merchants who sell chainsaw-carved wooden statues and bourbon maple syrup. Under Leonard's direction, local residents converted the former Sears space into an elaborate Christmas village for the holidays using empty cardboard refrigerator boxes.

While sales at some of the local stores were better than expected during the 2017 holiday season, the mall still faced other challenges. Bon-Ton closed in early 2018 leaving JCPenney as the only anchor left.

On April 30, 2024, further demolition began on the mall's interior as it became a shipping warehouse, rebranded as the St. Lawrence Industrial Complex. With the closure of Maurice's, JCPenney remains the sole tenant of the mall.

== See also ==
- List of shopping malls in New York
