= Montreal Subdivision (CSX Transportation) =

Railway line in Quebec and New York

CN Montreal Subdivision
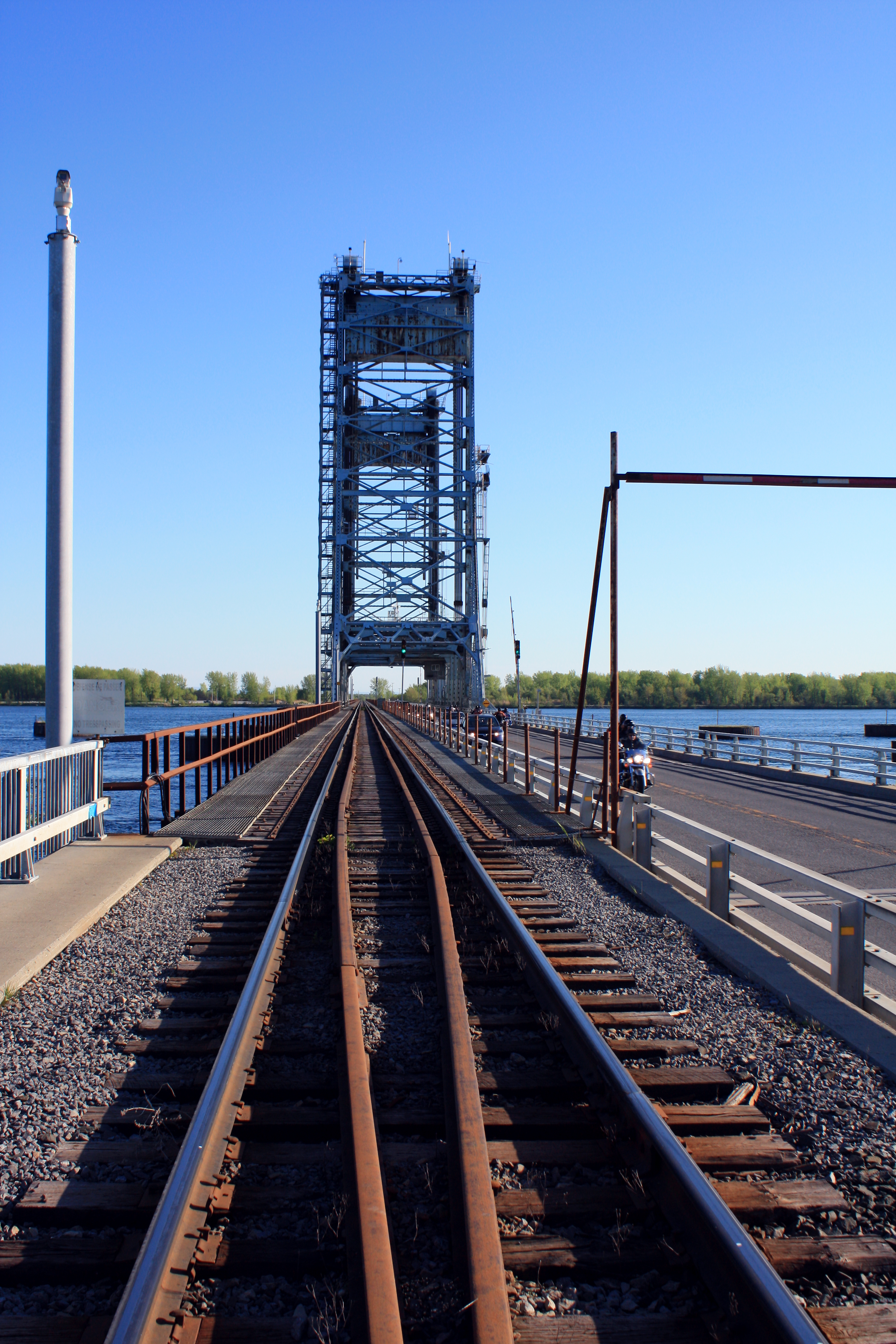
- Larocque vertical lift bridge, over Beauharnois canal.

Overview
- Termini: Adirondack Junction, Quebec; Massena, New York

History
- Opened: 1897

Technical
- Line length: 77.4 mi (124.6 km)
- Track gauge: 1,435 mm (4 ft 8 1/2 in) standard gauge

The Montreal Subdivision is a railroad line owned by the St. Lawrence and Adirondack Railway and Canadian National. Operations are currently conducted by Canadian National. The line originally ran from Massena, New York, northeast to Kahnawake, Quebec, along a former New York Central Railroad line. At its south end, the St. Lawrence Subdivision continues south; its north end was at Adirondack Junction, a junction with the Canadian Pacific Railway's Adirondack Subdivision, along which it had trackage rights north over the Saint-Laurent Railway Bridge into Montreal.

== History ==
The section from Huntingdon, Quebec, north to Salaberry-de-Valleyfield opened in 1892 as part of the St. Lawrence and Adirondack Railway. The line from Valleyfield to Beauharnois was originally a branch of the Grand Trunk Railway, built in the 1880s. The StL&A leased this line, and in 1897, they opened an extension from Beauharnois to Adirondack Junction. The line passed to the New York Central Railroad and Conrail through leases, mergers, and takeovers. Conrail bought the line from Massena to Huntingdon from the Canadian National Railway in 1993.

== See also ==
- List of CSX Transportation lines
