= Robert Moses State Park – Thousand Islands =

State park in St. Lawrence County, New York

Robert Moses State Park
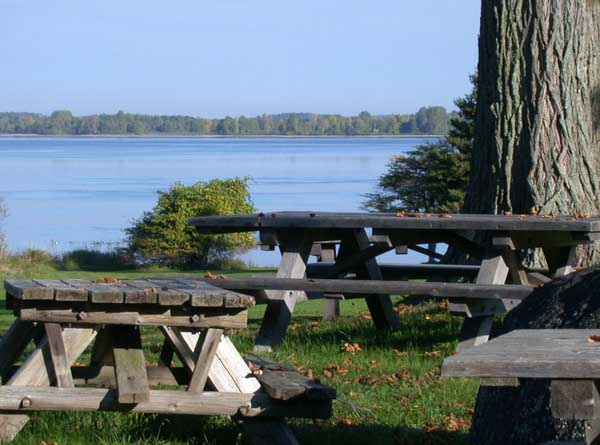
- Picnic tables along the Saint Lawrence River in Robert Moses State Park.

- Location within New York
- Type: State park
- Location: 19 Robinson Bay Road; Massena, New York
- Nearest city: Massena, New York
- Coordinates: 44°59′N 74°51′W
- Area: 2,322 acres (9.40 km^{2})
- Operator: New York State Office of Parks, Recreation and Historic Preservation
- Visitors: 98,257 (in 2014)
- Open: All year
- Website: Robert Moses State Park

Robert Moses State Park – Thousand Islands is a 2,322-acre (9.40 km^{2}) state park located on Barnhart Island in the Saint Lawrence River and the adjacent mainland in the Town of Massena in St. Lawrence County, New York. The park is north of the Village of Massena, near the Canada–US border.

The park is named after former New York Parks Commissioner Robert Moses, who created many of the state parks in New York. It is one of two state parks in New York to bear his name. The other, Robert Moses State Park - Long Island, is in southern New York on Fire Island.

== Park description ==
Robert Moses State Park offers a beach, picnic tables with pavilions, a playground, recreation programs, a nature trail, hiking trails through woods and wetlands, fishing, a boat launch and marina, a campground with tent and trailer sites, cabins, cross-country skiing and snowmobiling, and a food concession.

Visitors may access the portion of the park on Barnhart Island by traveling through a tunnel below the Eisenhower Locks, part of the Saint Lawrence Seaway.

A nature center offers outdoor education opportunities, and is managed by the Friends of the Robert Moses State Park Nature Center, Inc. In May 2017, the center reopened as the Eugene L. Nicandri Nature Center. The new facility, financed by the New York Power Authority, replaced the former nature center that was destroyed in a March 2010 fire.

A sign near the entrance of the park notes the location where the 45th parallel crosses through the park.

== See also ==
- List of New York state parks
- List of nature centers in New York
