= Helena, New York =

Hamlet in the Town of Brasher, New York, US

Helena is a hamlet in the Town of Brasher in St. Lawrence County, New York, United States.

Helena was the name of the daughter of Joseph Pitcairn. It is also known as "Ohi'karónthne", a Mohawk name which translates to "at the place of the thorn bush".

== Infrastructure ==
A new bridge finished construction in November 2021

== Map Coordinates ==
- 44°55′18″N 74°43′35″W
- 44.921718°N 74.726297°W
