= WYBG =

- Massena, New York; United States
- Frequency: 1050 kHz

Programming
- Format: Defunct (formerly talk radio)

Ownership
- Owner: Wade Communications, Inc.

History
- First air date: August 18, 1958
- Last air date: June 30, 2015
- Former call signs: WSTS (1958–1965)

Technical information
- Facility ID: 70680
- Class: D
- Power: 1,000 watts day 66 watts night
- Transmitter coordinates: 44°53′42″N 74°56′5″W

WYBG (1050 AM) was a radio station which broadcast a talk radio format. Licensed to Massena, New York, United States, the station was last owned by Wade Communications, Inc., a company locally owned by Curran and Dottie Wade.

During nighttime hours, the station reduced its power to 66 watts to protect Toronto's CHUM and New York's WEPN.

The Wades had put WYBG up for sale; the station signed off for good on June 30, 2015, after 57 years on the air, when no one came forward to acquire the station. The station's license was to be cancelled by the end of July 2015 if no interested party came forward. Wade Communications surrendered WYBG's license to the Federal Communications Commission (FCC) on August 28, 2015. The station's call sign was deleted from the FCC's database on September 2, 2015.
