= Massena (village), New York =

Massena, New York
- Village
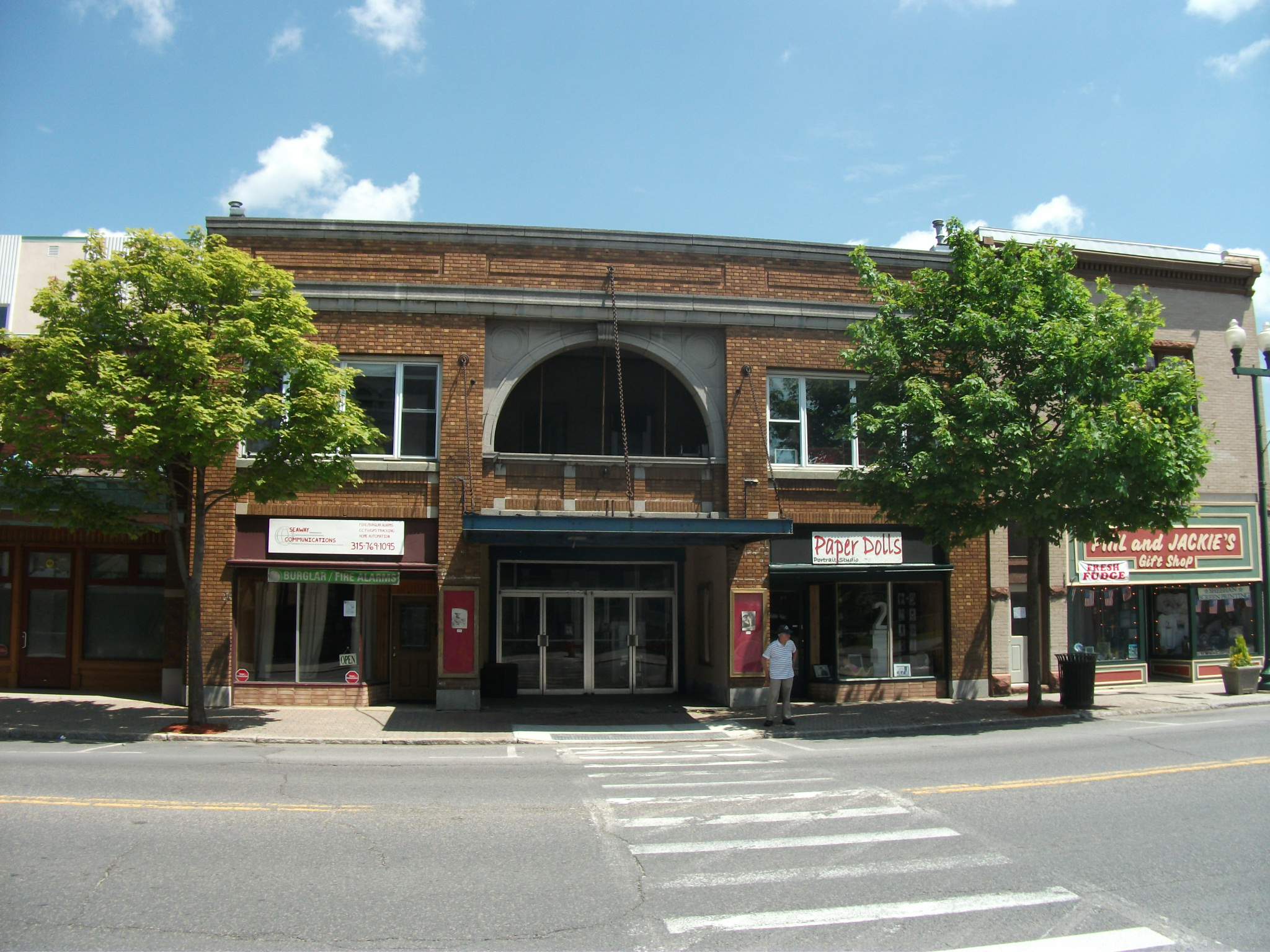
- Downtown Massena

- Location within the state of New York
- Coordinates: 44°55′49″N 74°53′27″W
- Country: United States
- State: New York
- County: St. Lawrence

Government
  - Mayor: Gregory Paquin

Area
  - Total: 4.73 sq mi (12.25 km^{2})
  - Land: 4.53 sq mi (11.73 km^{2})
  - Water: 0.20 sq mi (0.52 km^{2})
- Elevation: 230 ft (70 m)

Population (2020)
  - Total: 10,151
  - Density: 2,240.6/sq mi (865.11/km^{2})
- Time zone: UTC-5 (Eastern (EST))
  - Summer (DST): UTC-4 (EDT)
- FIPS code: 36-46019
- GNIS feature ID: 0976634
- Website: https://massena.us/

Massena is a village in St. Lawrence County, New York, United States. The village is named after André Masséna, one of Napoleon's generals.

The Village of Massena is at the southwestern town line of the Town of Massena, with a small southeastern section of the community spilling into the Town of Louisville, and a tiny portion in the Town of Norfolk. The village is located near the northern border of the county.

== History ==
The village was first settled circa 1803. Part of its early growth was based on neighboring medicinal springs. André Masséna was one of the original eighteen Marshals of France created by Napoleon.

Massena is the hometown of Baseball Hall of Fame member Bid McPhee, who was born there in 1859. Voice actor Hal Smith spent a significant part of his early years living in Massena. He graduated from the Massena High School in 1936.

In 1928, Massena was the site of a blood libel against its small Jewish community. Its history has been recorded by the town's longstanding newspaper, The Courier-Observer, formerly named The Massena Observer' , and in The Incident at Massena, a 1978 book by historian Saul S. Friedman.

Throughout the mid 20th century, Massena experienced enormous growth due to the construction of the Franklin D. Roosevelt power project and the Eisenhower locks which helped connect the Atlantic Ocean to the Great Lakes via the St. Lawrence River. Massena established itself as the manufacturing center of St. Lawrence county with Aluminum Company Of America (Alcoa) plant, Reynolds Metals plant (now Alcoa) and a General Motors Powertrain plant (dismantled in 2011). The Alcoa East plant was temporarily idled in 2009, but began to restart pot lines in January 2011.

The village has experienced a decline in population in recent decades largely due to its eroding industrial base and incomes. The unemployment and crime rates for the village had doubled in the past decade. The village tax rates have gone up 52 percent since 2004. The government blames it on growing employee union increased pay demands and pension funds.

Many of the Main Street's storefronts of downtown remain vacant. Some of the abandoned buildings along Water Street have been torn down as well. Various vacant homes throughout the town have burned or also been torn down. Furthermore, the St. Lawrence Centre Mall, once a thriving shopping center, has seen nearly 90% of its stores close their doors at the mall, while many simply left the town altogether. The crime rate of Massena has gone up dramatically in the past 10 years. The village mayor Tim Currier was arrested on drug charges in 2020.

The Robinson Bay Archeological District was listed on the National Register of Historic Places in 1977.

== Geography ==
According to the United States Census Bureau, the village has a total area of 4.7 square miles (12.2 km^{2}), of which 4.5 square miles (11.7 km^{2}) is land and 0.2 square mile (0.5 km^{2}) (3.82%) is water.

The village is located on the banks of the Grasse River and the Raquette River and on the shore of the St. Lawrence River. Robert Moses State Park is located northeast of the village. The Eisenhower Lock System is located around the area before the State Park, was established in 1954 and has been running since.

East–west highway New York State Route 37B intersects New York State Route 37 in the village, and both intersect New York State Route 420, a north–south highway.

=== Climate ===
Climate data for Massena International Airport, New York, 1991–2020 normals, 1948-2020 extremes: 214ft (65m)
Month	Jan	Feb	Mar	Apr	May	Jun	Jul	Aug	Sep	Oct	Nov	Dec	Year
Record high °F (°C)	67 (19)	63 (17)	84 (29)	89 (32)	96 (36)	97 (36)	99 (37)	100 (38)	95 (35)	85 (29)	78 (26)	68 (20)	100 (38)
Mean maximum °F (°C)	50.9 (10.5)	48.6 (9.2)	61.7 (16.5)	77.1 (25.1)	86.6 (30.3)	89.3 (31.8)	90.2 (32.3)	89.6 (32.0)	86.2 (30.1)	77.0 (25.0)	66.2 (19.0)	54.2 (12.3)	92.4 (33.6)
Mean daily maximum °F (°C)	25.4 (−3.7)	28.2 (−2.1)	38.2 (3.4)	53.7 (12.1)	67.9 (19.9)	76.2 (24.6)	80.8 (27.1)	78.9 (26.1)	71.2 (21.8)	57.5 (14.2)	44.6 (7.0)	32.1 (0.1)	54.6 (12.5)
Daily mean °F (°C)	15.6 (−9.1)	17.8 (−7.9)	28.5 (−1.9)	42.9 (6.1)	55.9 (13.3)	64.8 (18.2)	69.5 (20.8)	67.5 (19.7)	59.5 (15.3)	47.5 (8.6)	35.8 (2.1)	23.8 (−4.6)	44.1 (6.7)
Mean daily minimum °F (°C)	5.9 (−14.5)	7.3 (−13.7)	18.7 (−7.4)	32.2 (0.1)	43.9 (6.6)	53.4 (11.9)	58.2 (14.6)	56.2 (13.4)	47.8 (8.8)	37.4 (3.0)	26.9 (−2.8)	15.5 (−9.2)	33.6 (0.9)
Mean minimum °F (°C)	−20.0 (−28.9)	−16.2 (−26.8)	−4.8 (−20.4)	18.8 (−7.3)	29.8 (−1.2)	40.3 (4.6)	47.7 (8.7)	43.6 (6.4)	32.7 (0.4)	22.7 (−5.2)	9.6 (−12.4)	−9.6 (−23.1)	−22.7 (−30.4)
Record low °F (°C)	−44 (−42)	−38 (−39)	−26 (−32)	6 (−14)	20 (−7)	31 (−1)	38 (3)	35 (2)	24 (−4)	15 (−9)	−9 (−23)	−33 (−36)	−44 (−42)
Average precipitation inches (mm)	2.11 (54)	1.58 (40)	2.04 (52)	2.91 (74)	3.14 (80)	3.71 (94)	3.46 (88)	3.36 (85)	3.50 (89)	3.43 (87)	2.59 (66)	2.09 (53)	33.92 (862)
Average snowfall inches (cm)	17.1 (43)	15.0 (38)	10.5 (27)	5.1 (13)	0.1 (0.25)	0.0 (0.0)	0.0 (0.0)	0.0 (0.0)	0.0 (0.0)	1.0 (2.5)	6.3 (16)	14.3 (36)	69.4 (175.75)
Source 1: NOAA(1981-2010 Snowfall)
Source 2: XMACIS2 (records & monthly max/mins)

== Demographics ==
Historical population
Census	Pop.	Note	%±
1820	944		—
1830	2,070		119.3%
1840	2,726		31.7%
1850	2,870		5.3%
1860	2,925		1.9%
1870	2,560		−12.5%
1880	2,739		7.0%
1890	2,740		0.0%
1900	3,904		42.5%
1910	4,806		23.1%
1920	8,975		86.7%
1930	12,029		34.0%
1940	12,979		7.9%
1950	17,937		38.2%
1960	21,346		19.0%
1970	16,021		−24.9%
1980	14,856		−7.3%
1990	13,826		−6.9%
2000	13,121		−5.1%
2010	10,936		−16.7%
2020	10,151		−7.2%
U.S. Decennial Census

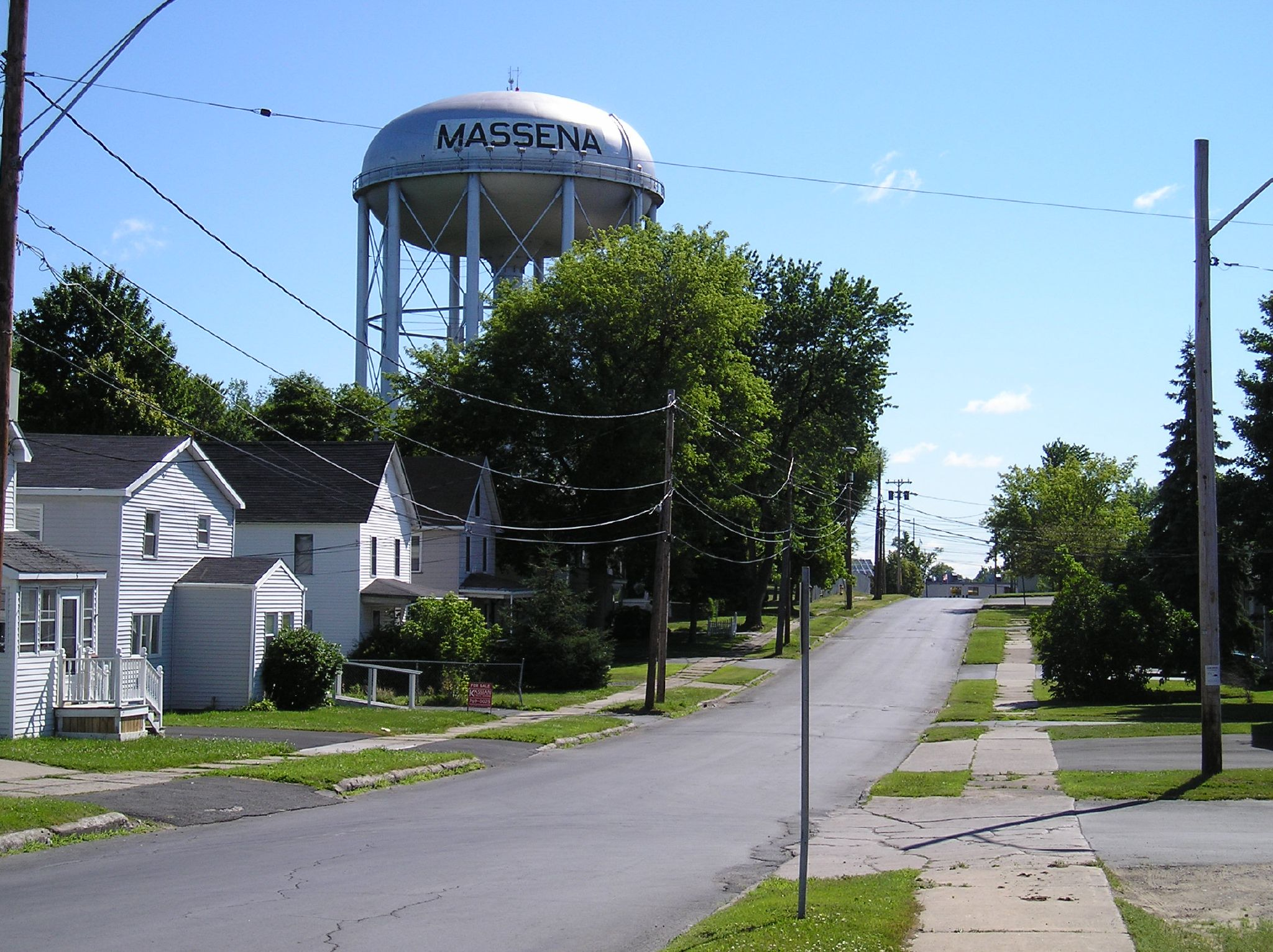
The town's water tower.

As of the census of 2000, there were 13,121 people, 2,510 households, and 3,454 families residing in the town. The population density was 293.7 inhabitants per square mile (113.4/km^{2}). There were 5,880 housing units at an average density of 131.6 per square mile (50.8/km^{2}). The racial makeup of the town was 96.80% White, 0.30% Black or African American, 1.25% Native American, 0.41% Asian, 0.03% Pacific Islander, 0.18% from other races, and .02% from two or more races. Hispanic or Latino of any race were 0.83% of the population.

There were 5,510 households, out of which 39.4% had children under the age of 18 living with them, 36.1% were married couples living together, 12.2% had a female householder with no husband present, and 37.3% were non-families. 31.1% of all households were made up of individuals, and 13.9% had someone living alone who was 65 years of age or older. The average household size was 2.98 and the average family size was 3.67.

In the town, the population was spread out, with 23.7% under the age of 18, 7.1% from 18 to 24, 27.3% from 25 to 44, 23.2% from 45 to 64, and 18.8% who were 65 years of age or older. The median age was 36 years. For every 100 females, there were 88.6 males. For every 100 females age 18 and over, there were 84.7 males.

The median income for a household in the town was $28,391, and the median income for a family was $32,696. Males had a median income of $38,484 versus $18,819 for females. The per capita income for the town was $15,111. About 16.9% of families and 28.9% of the population were below the poverty line, including 25.4% of those under age 18 and 10.8% of those age 65 or over.

== Radio ==
- WMSA 1340
- WVLF-FM Mix 96.1
- WRCD-FM 101.5 The Fox
- WYBG 1050 (defunct)

== Education ==
The village is in the Massena Central School District. The public high school of the district is Massena Central High School.
