= Stephanie Bissonnette =

American stage choreographer (1990–2022)

- Born: Stephanie Bissonnette; October 26, 1990; Hollywood, California, U.S.
- Died: December 17, 2022 (aged 32); New York City, New York, U.S.
- Occupation: Stage choreographer
- Years active: 2003–2022

Stephanie Bissonnette (October 26, 1990 – December 17, 2022) was an American stage choreographer who was best known for her work in the musical Mean Girls, where she originated the role of Dawn Schweitzer. She was also featured in Ensemble, the Broadway on Demand documentary that told the stories of Broadway dancers navigating the COVID-19 shutdown.

Bissonnette was a graduate of Point Park University's Conservatory of the Performing Arts. In addition to her stage work, she served as a choreographer for productions at The Muny, Riverside Theatre, Seven Angels Theatre, and Shakespeare Theatre Company. She was diagnosed with medulloblastoma in 2019, and she died at age 32 on December 17, 2022.
