= WRCD =

Classic rock radio station in Canton, New York, United States

- Canton, New York; United States
- Broadcast area: St. Lawrence County, New York; Cornwall–Brockville, Ontario
- Frequency: 101.5 MHz
- Branding: 101.5 The Fox

Programming
- Format: Classic rock
- Affiliations: United Stations Radio Networks; Westwood One

Ownership
- Owner: Stephens Media Group; (Stephens Media Group Massena, LLC)
- Sister stations: WMSA; WVLF

History
- First air date: 1996 (as WXQZ)
- Former call signs: WXQZ (1996–1999)

Technical information
- Licensing authority: FCC
- Facility ID: 15821
- Class: C2
- ERP: 50,000 watts
- HAAT: 138 meters (453 ft)
- Transmitter coordinates: 44°35′56.2″N 74°46′22.7″W

Links
- Public license information: Public file; LMS
- Webcast: Listen live
- Website: www.1015thefox.com

WRCD (101.5 FM) is a commercial radio station broadcasting a classic rock radio format. Licensed to Canton, New York, the station is owned by the Stephens Media Group. WRCD is an affiliate of The Bob & Tom Show.

WRCD has an effective radiated power (ERP) of 50,000 watts. It covers much of St. Lawrence County, New York and Eastern Ontario.

== History ==
In 1996, the station signed on the air. Its original call sign was WXQZ. WXQZ broadcast a country format as "Fun 101". In 1999, it switched its call letters to WRCD. WRCD first had a mainstream rock format as "Rock 101.5" before flipping to its current format and branding.

The station was previously owned by Martz Communications Group, and was acquired by Stephens as of February 1, 2008.
