= Massena International Airport =

Massena International Airport Richards Field

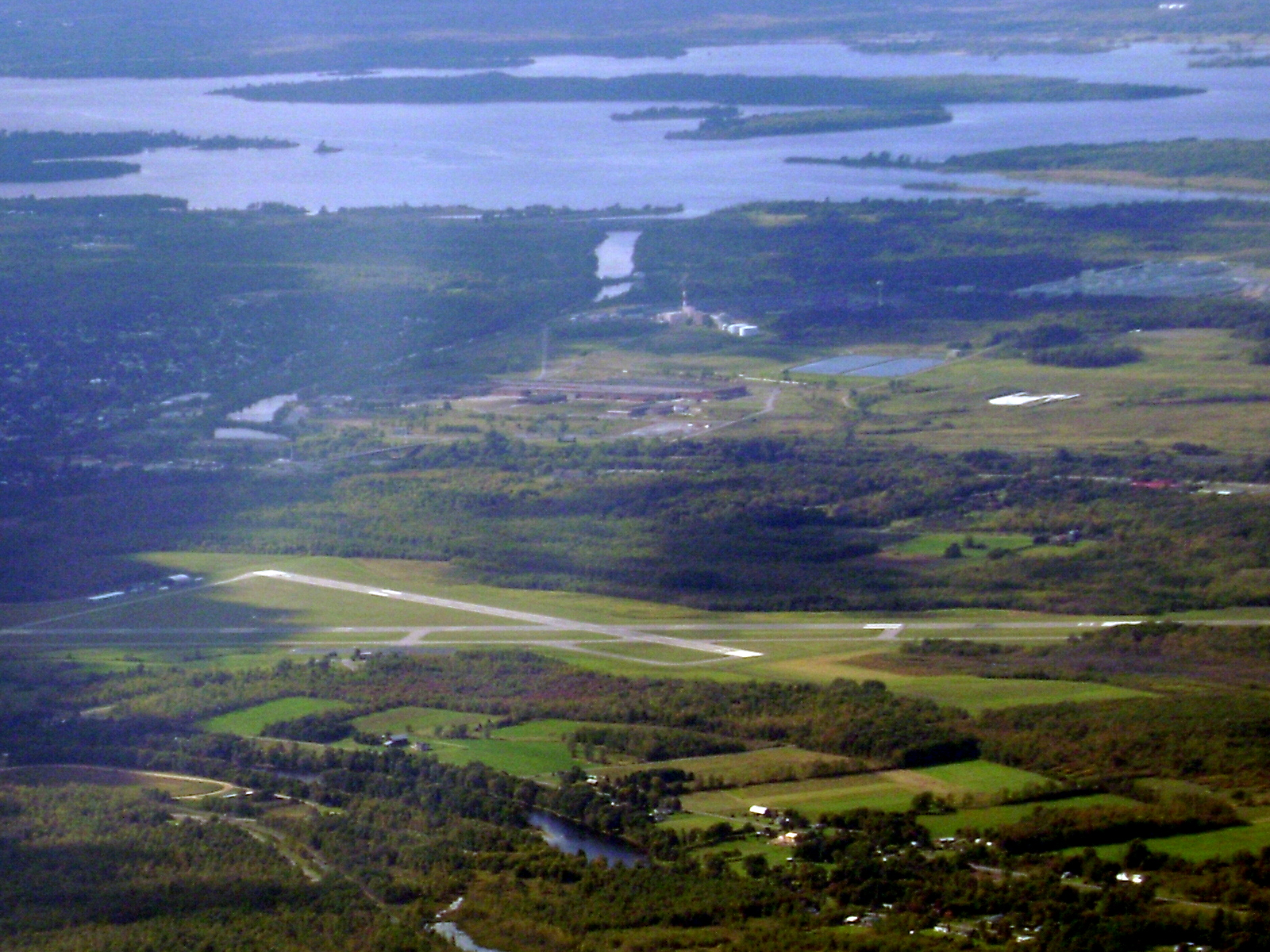
- Airport in 2007
- IATA: MSS; ICAO: KMSS; FAA LID: MSS

Summary
- Airport type: Public
- Owner: Town of Massena
- Serves: Massena, New York, U.S.
- Elevation AMSL: 221 ft (67 m)
- Coordinates: 44°56′09″N 074°50′44″W
- Website: flymassena.com

Map
- Interactive map of Massena International Airport

Runways
Direction	Length		Surface
Direction	ft	m	Surface
5/23	5,600	1,707	Asphalt
9/27	4,000	1,219	Asphalt

Statistics (5/30/2017 – 5/30/2018)
- Aircraft operations: 9,190
- Based aircraft: 9
- Source: Federal Aviation Administration

Massena International Airport (IATA: MSS, ICAO: KMSS, FAA LID: MSS) (Richards Field) is in St. Lawrence County, New York. It is two nautical miles (3.7 km) east of the village of Massena. The airport sees one airline, subsidized by the Essential Air Service program.

Federal Aviation Administration records say the airport had 971 passenger boardings (enplanements) in calendar year 2008, 3,252 in 2009 and 3,350 in 2010. The National Plan of Integrated Airport Systems for 2011–2015 categorized it as a general aviation airport.

== Facilities ==
The airport covers 752 acres (304 ha) at an elevation of 222 feet (68 m). It has two asphalt runways: 5/23 is 5,600 by 100 feet (1,707 by 30 m) and 9/27 is 4,000 by 100 feet (1,219 by 30 m).

In the year ending June 30, 2011 the airport had 9,040 aircraft operations, average 24 per day: 68% general aviation, 24% air taxi, and 8% military. 10 aircraft were then based at this airport: 90% single-engine and 10% multi-engine.

Air cargo, charter, limo, courier, and overnight express, and full service for jet refueling are offered. The airport has VOR, ILS, and RNAV navigational approaches. The airport is an uncontrolled airport with no control tower.

Massena, New York does not have international service. It is an "International Airport" as a United States Customs Service port of entry for planes entering the United States from foreign countries. More Canadians than Americans use the airport, which is 56 miles (90 km) from Ottawa, Ontario, 73 miles (117 km) from Montreal, Quebec, and 8.1 miles (13.0 km) from Cornwall, Ontario. A one-hour advance ETA notice is required for unscheduled flights.

== Airline and destinations ==
Airlines	Destinations
Boutique Air	Boston

The airport is served by Boutique Air, with direct flights to Boston Logan International Airport and until recently to Baltimore/Washington International Airport. Boutique Air has codeshare agreements with United Airlines and American Airlines, allowing passengers seamless connections to domestic flights at both airports.

== Historical airline service ==
The first airline flights were Colonial Airlines DC-3s in 1946. Colonial was merged into Eastern Air Lines in 1956 which continued to serve Massena until 1961, replaced by Mohawk Airlines. Mohawk continued service until 1969, replaced by Air North. Air North began operating as Allegheny Commuter in 1972, a feeder carrier for Allegheny Airlines which later became USAir. Air North reverted to their own branding in 1979 and was merged into Clinton Aero in 1982. Clinton Aero later became Brockway Air and began operating as Piedmont Commuter in association with Piedmont Airlines in 1986. Most service was flown on a route between Boston and Syracuse with stops at Burlington VT, Plattsburg, Massena, Ogdensburg, and Watertown, NY. In 1989, Brockway Air became Metro Air Northeast and switched their code-share affiliate to operate as Trans World Express in association with TWA. Metro Air Northeast ceased operating in early 1991.

Beginning in July, 1991, Massena was then served by USAir Express in association with USAir and becoming US Airways Express in 1997. Flights to Pittsburgh were flown with stops at Ogdensburg and Watertown and the carriers operating this service were Chautauqua Airlines followed by Mesa Airlines and Air Midwest. This service ended in 2007, replaced by Big Sky Airlines operating as Delta Connection flying to Boston with a stop at either Ogdensburg or Watertown. The Delta service was short lived and ended the following year. Cape Air then served Massena from 2008 with flights to Albany, NY until the current provider, Boutique Air began service in 2017.

== Statistics ==
Passenger boardings (enplanements) by year, as per the FAA
Year	2009	2010	2011	2012	2013	2014	2015	2016	2017	2018	2019	2020	2021	2022	2023
Enplanements	3,252	3,350	4,396	4,964	4,788	4,553	4,462	5,311	4,852	4,463	5,056			4,721	4,959
Change	▲234.91%	▲3.01%	▲31.22%	▲12.92%	▼3.55%	▼4.91%	▼2.00%	▲19.03%	▼8.64%	▼8.02%	▲13.29%				▲5.04%
Airline	Cape Air	Cape Air	Cape Air	Cape Air	Cape Air	Cape Air	Cape Air	Cape Air	Boutique Air	Boutique Air	Boutique Air	Boutique Air	Boutique Air	Boutique Air	Boutique Air
Destination(s)	Albany	Albany	Albany	Albany	Albany	Albany	Albany	Albany	Albany Baltimore	Boston	Boston	Boston	Boston	Boston	Boston

== See also ==
- List of airports in New York

== Other sources ==
- Essential Air Service documents (Docket OST-1997-2842) from the U.S. Department of Transportation:
  - Order 2005-5-8: reselects Mesa Air Group, Inc., d/b/a Air Midwest, to continue providing essential air service (EAS) at Massena, Ogdensburg and Watertown, New York, for a two-year period, and establishes an annual subsidy of $1,757,834 for service consisting of three round trips each weekday and three over the weekend period between the communities and Pittsburgh, with 19-seat Beech 1900D aircraft.
  - Order 2006-12-22: selecting Big Sky Transportation Co., a wholly owned subsidiary of MAIR Holdings, Inc. d/b/a Big Sky Airlines, to provide essential air service (EAS) at Massena, Ogdensburg, and Watertown, New York, consisting of 18 weekly round trips, three each weekday and three each weekend, to Boston, with 19-seat Beech 1900D turboprop aircraft for the two-year period beginning on or about March 1, 2007, at a combined annual subsidy of $2,097,906.
  - Order 2008-3-15: selecting Hyannis Air Service, Inc. d/b/a Cape Air, to provide subsidized essential air service (EAS) at Massena, Ogdensburg, and Watertown, New York, for the two-year period beginning when the carrier inaugurates full EAS pursuant to this Order, at a total annual subsidy of $3,879,863.
  - Order 2011-1-6: selecting Hyannis Air Service, Inc. d/b/a Cape Air, to continue providing subsidized essential air service (EAS) at Massena (for two years), at the annual subsidy rate of $1,708,911.
