= Louisville, New York =

Louisville
- Town
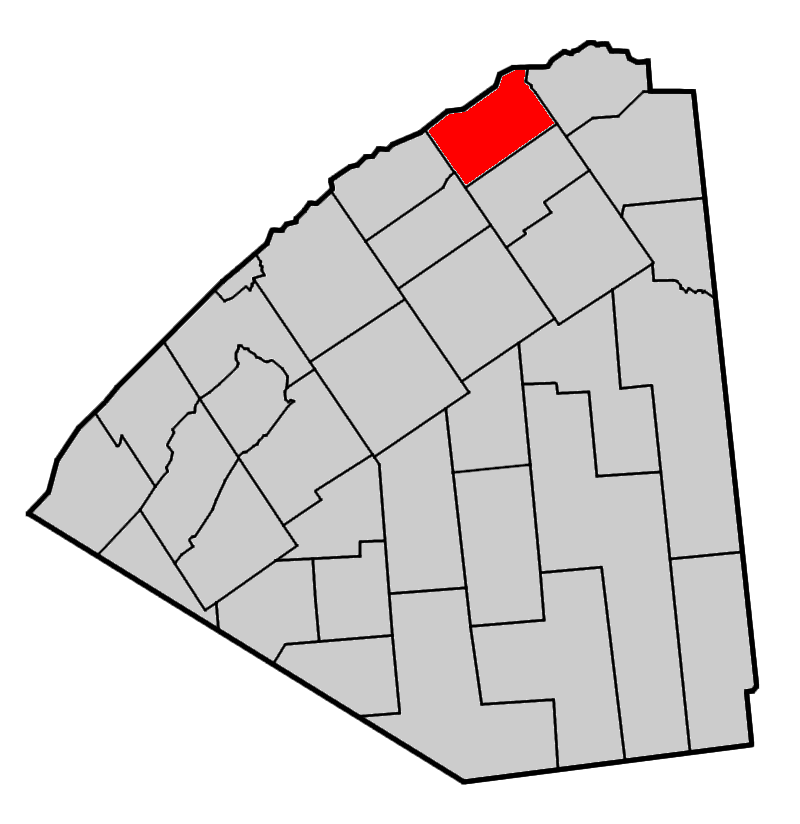
- Map highlighting Louisville's location within St. Lawrence County.

- Location within the state of New York
- Coordinates: 44°54′6″N 75°0′11″W
- Country: United States
- State: New York
- County: St. Lawrence
- Named for: Louis XIV of France

Area
  - Total: 63.87 sq mi (165.41 km^{2})
  - Land: 48.53 sq mi (125.68 km^{2})
  - Water: 15.34 sq mi (39.74 km^{2})
- Elevation: 266 ft (81 m)

Population (2020)
  - Total: 3,050
  - Density: 63.8/sq mi (24.65/km^{2})
- Time zone: UTC-5 (Eastern (EST))
  - Summer (DST): UTC-4 (EDT)
- FIPS code: 36-43588
- GNIS feature ID: 0979170
- Website: https://www.louisvilleny.gov/

Louisville is a town in St. Lawrence County, New York, United States. The population was 3,145 at the 2010 census. The town is reportedly named after King Louis XIV of France, but is pronounced as "Lewis-ville."

The Town of Louisville is at the northern border of the county and is west of Village of Massena.

== History ==
Nahum Wilson, originally from Peru, NY, and his family were the first to settle the area in April 1800.

The town was established in 1810 from part of the Town of Massena. Almost half of Louisville was lost to form the Town of Norfolk in 1823. Part of the lost territory was returned from the Town of Norfolk in 1844. An attempt to take part of Louisville for the Town of Massena in 1849 was rejected.

Early settlers frequently interacted with their Canadian neighbours (then British North America) and both would often cross the St. Lawrence River to meet. During the War of 1812, although they still had good relations with their neighbours, the men of Louisville formed a militia and elected Benjamin Daniels as their "high sergeant". The militia controlled traffic down the river, but were ordered to allow Native Americans to pass.

After the war, meetings between the residents and Canadians would still take place confidentially overnight.

== Geography ==
According to the United States Census Bureau, the town has a total area of 63.8 square miles (165 km^{2}), of which 48.2 square miles (125 km^{2}) is land and 15.7 square miles (41 km^{2}) (24.58%) is water.

The northern town line, which is delineated by the St. Lawrence River, is the international border with Canada, specifically the Province of Ontario. The Grasse River flows northeastward through the town.

New York State Route 37 is an east–west highway in the northern part of the town. New York State Route 131 is a short highway near the St. Lawrence River. New York State Route 37B diverges northward from NY-37 near the eastern town line. New York State Route 56 crosses the eastern part of Louisville and intersects NY-37 by the eastern town line.

== Demographics ==
Historical population
Census	Pop.	Note	%±
1820	831		—
1830	1,076		29.5%
1840	1,693		57.3%
1850	2,054		21.3%
1860	2,310		12.5%
1870	2,132		−7.7%
1880	2,619		22.8%
1890	1,676		−36.0%
1900	1,621		−3.3%
1910	1,492		−8.0%
1920	1,364		−8.6%
1930	1,355		−0.7%
1940	1,589		17.3%
1950	1,825		14.9%
1960	2,520		38.1%
1970	2,727		8.2%
1980	2,946		8.0%
1990	3,040		3.2%
2000	3,195		5.1%
2010	3,145		−1.6%
2020	3,050		−3.0%

As of the census of 2000, there were 3,195 people, 1,279 households, and 892 families residing in the town. The population density was 66.3 inhabitants per square mile (25.6/km^{2}). There were 1,437 housing units at an average density of 29.8 per square mile (11.5/km^{2}). The racial makeup of the town was 96.88% White, 0.3% African American, 0.97% Native American, 1.25% Asian, 0.19% from other races, and 0.50% from two or more races. Hispanic or Latino of any race were 1.53% of the population.

There were 1,279 households, out of which 31.0% had children under the age of 18 living with them, 59.9% were married couples living together, 6.2% had a female householder with no husband present, and 30.2% were non-families. 24.2% of all households were made up of individuals, and 10.6% had someone living alone who was 65 years of age or older. The average household size was 2.50 and the average family size was 2.97.

In the town, the population was spread out, with 24.9% under the age of 18, 5.8% from 18 to 24, 27.7% from 25 to 44, 27.5% from 45 to 64, and 14.0% who were 65 years of age or older. The median age was 40 years. For every 100 females, there were 102.0 males. For every 100 females age 18 and over, there were 98.3 males.

The median income for a household in the town was $139,125, and the median income for a family was $110,463. Males had a median income of $112,083 versus $75,855 for females. The per capita income for the town was $69,127. About 3.2% of families and 6.1% of the population were below the poverty line, including 14.1% of those under age 18 and 6.8% of those age 65 or over.

== Communities and locations in Louisville ==
- Bradford Island – An island in the St. Lawrence River, west of Wilson Hill Island.
- Chase Mills – A hamlet at the western town line by the Grass River.
- Coles Creek – A wide stream emptying into the St. Lawrence River by the northwestern part of the town.
- Croil Island – An island in the St. Lawrence River at the northeastern corner of the town. This island was once called "Ile au Chamailles" and was later named "Baxters Island" and "Stacys Island." It was not declared to be part the United States until 1818.
- Dishaw – A hamlet by the southern town line.
- Louisville – The hamlet of Louisville is in the western part of the town by the Grass River, near the junction of County Roads 36 and 39. It was previously called "Millerville."
- Louisville Corner - A hamlet north of Louisville, located on NY-37 at the junction of NY-131.
- Louisville Landing – A former port on the St. Lawrence River.
- Nichols Hill Island – An island in the St. Lawrence River in the northwest of Louisville.
- Richards Point – A location on the St. Lawrence River, north of Tucker Terrace.
- Tucker Terrace – A hamlet in the northeastern part of the town on Route 131, near the St. Lawrence River.
- Wilson Hill Island – An island in the St. Lawrence River, west of Bradford Island.
