= Frederic Remington =

American painter and sculptor (1861–1909)

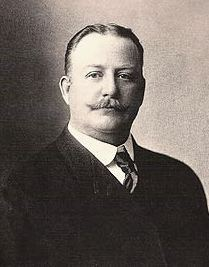
- Frederic Remington
- Born: Frederic Sackrider Remington; October 4, 1861; Canton, New York, U.S.
- Died: December 26, 1909 (aged 48); Ridgefield, Connecticut, U.S.
- Education: Yale University, New Haven, Connecticut, one drawing class, 1878; Art Students League, New York, 1886
- Known for: Painting (watercolor and oil), sculpture, drawing (pen and ink, ink wash), mixed media, journalist and writer
- Notable work: The Bronco Buster
- Movement: Illustration, Impressionism, Nocturne, and Tonalism
- Spouse: Eva Caten (1884–1909)
- Relatives: Eliphalet Remington (cousin)
- Awards: 1891: Elected Associate of the National Academy of Design (ANA)
- Patrons: Theodore Roosevelt, Elizabeth Custer, Harper's Weekly, Harper's Monthly, Century Magazine, Scribner's, Cosmopolitan, Collier's, and many others

Frederic Sackrider Remington (October 4, 1861 – December 26, 1909) was an American painter, illustrator, sculptor, and writer who specialized in the genre of Western American Art. His works are known for depicting the Western United States in the last quarter of the 19th century and featuring such images as cowboys, Native Americans, and the US Cavalry.

== Early life and education ==
Remington was born in Canton, New York, in 1861 to Seth Pierrepont Remington (1830–1880) and Clarissa (Clara) Bascom Sackrider (1836–1912).

His maternal family owned hardware stores and emigrated from Alsace-Lorraine in the early 18th century. His maternal family, of French Basque ancestry, came to America in the early 1600s and founded Windsor, Connecticut. Remington's father was a Union army colonel in the American Civil War, whose family had arrived in America from England in 1637. He was a newspaper editor and postmaster, and the staunchly Republican family was active in local politics. The Remingtons were horsemen. One of Remington's great-grandfathers, Samuel Bascom, was a saddle maker by trade. Remington's ancestors also fought in the French and Indian War, the American Revolution, and the War of 1812.

Remington was a cousin of Eliphalet Remington, founder of the Remington Arms Company, which is considered America's oldest gunmaker. He was also related to three famous mountain men: Jedediah Smith, Jonathan T. Warner, and Robert "Doc" Newell. Through the Warner side of his family, Remington was related to George Washington, the first U.S. president.

Colonel Remington was away at war during most of the first four years of his son's life. After the war, he moved his family to Bloomington, Illinois for a brief time and was appointed editor of the Bloomington Republican, but the family returned to Canton in 1867. Remington was the only child of the marriage, and received constant attention and approval. He was an active child, large and strong for his age, who loved to hunt, swim, ride, and go camping. He was a poor student though, particularly in math, which did not bode well for his father's ambitions for his son to attend West Point. He began to make drawings and sketches of soldiers and cowboys at an early age.

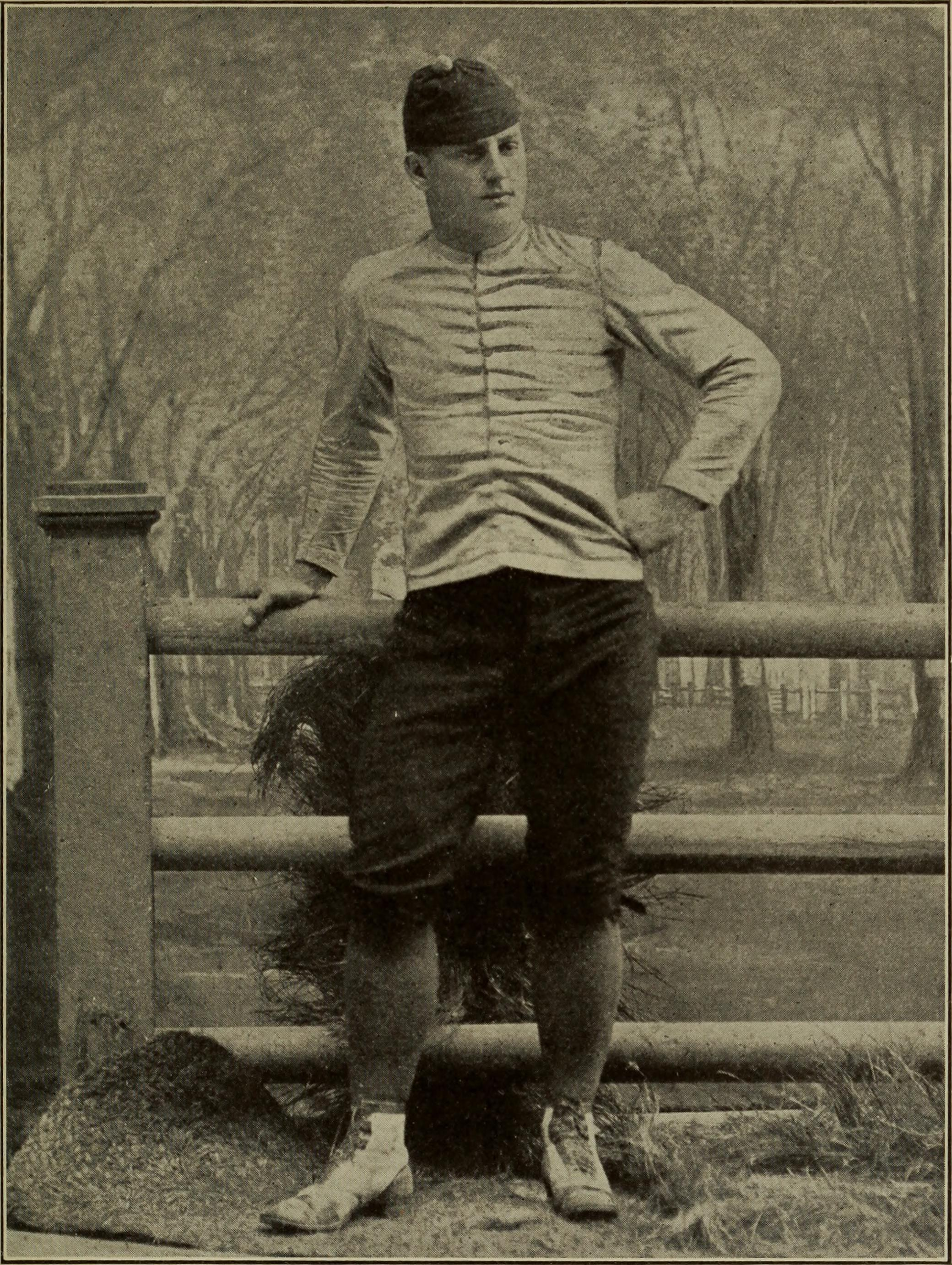
Remington in the football uniform of the day, including a canvas jacket and flannel trousers

The family moved to Ogdensburg, New York when Remington was eleven and he attended Vermont Episcopal Institute, a church-run military school, where his father hoped discipline would rein in his son's lack of focus and perhaps lead to a military career. Remington took his first drawing lessons at the institute. He then transferred to another military school where his classmates found the young Remington to be a pleasant fellow, a bit careless and lazy, good-humored, and generous of spirit but definitely not soldier material. He enjoyed making caricatures and silhouettes of his classmates. At 17, he wrote to his uncle of his modest ambitions, "I never intend to do any great amount of labor. I have but one short life and do not aspire to wealth or fame in a degree which could only be obtained by an extraordinary effort on my part." He imagined a career for himself as a journalist, with art as a sideline.

Remington attended the art school at Yale University and studied under John Henry Niemeyer. Remington was the only male student in his first year. He found that football and boxing were more interesting than the formal art training, particularly drawing from casts and still life objects. He preferred action drawing and his first published illustration was a cartoon of a "bandaged football player" for the student newspaper, Yale Courant. Though he was not a star player, his participation on the strong Yale football team was a great source of pride for Remington and his family. He left Yale in 1879 to tend to his ailing father, who had tuberculosis. His father died a year later, at 50, receiving respectful recognition from the citizens of Ogdensburg. Remington's Uncle Mart secured a good-paying clerical job for his nephew in Albany, New York, and Remington would return home on weekends to see his girlfriend Eva Caten. After the rejection of his engagement proposal to Eva by her father, Remington became a reporter for his uncle's newspaper and went on to other short-lived jobs.

== Career ==
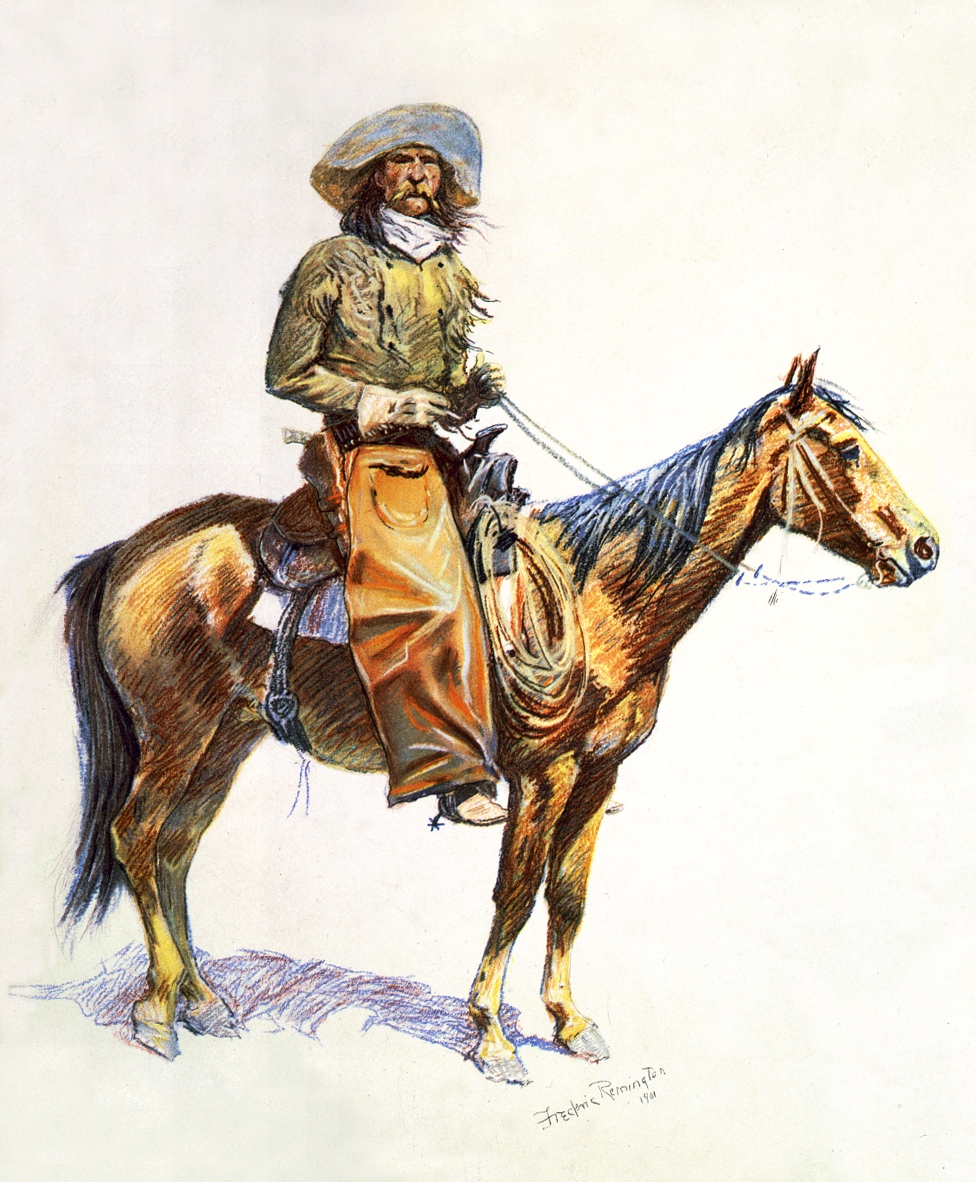
Arizona cow-boy, a 1901 lithograph by Remington

Living off his inheritance and modest work income, Remington refused to go back to art school and instead spent time camping and enjoying himself. At 19, he made his first trip west, going to Montana, at first to buy a cattle operation and then a mining interest, but realized that he did not have sufficient capital for either. In the American West of 1881, he saw the vast prairies, the quickly shrinking bison herds, the still unfenced cattle, and the last major confrontations of US Cavalry and Native American tribes, scenes he had imagined since his childhood. He also hunted grizzly bears with Montague Stevens in New Mexico in 1895. Though the trip was undertaken as a lark, it gave Remington a more authentic view of the West than some of the later artists and writers who followed in his footsteps, such as N. C. Wyeth and Zane Grey, who arrived twenty-five years later when much of the mythic West had already slipped into history. From that first trip, Harper's Weekly printed Remington's first published commercial effort, a re-drawing of a quick sketch on wrapping paper that he had mailed back east. In 1883, Remington went to rural Kansas, south of the city of Peabody near the tiny community of Plum Grove, to try his hand at the booming sheep ranching and wool trade, as one of the "holiday stockmen", rich young easterners out to make a quick killing as ranch owners. He invested his entire inheritance but found ranching to be a rough, boring, isolated occupation which deprived him of the finer things he was used to from East Coast life, and the real ranchers thought of him as lazy. In 1884, he sold his land.

Remington continued sketching, but his results were still cartoonish and amateur. Less than a year after selling his ranch, he went home. After acquiring more capital from his mother, he returned to Kansas City to start a hardware business, but due to an alleged swindle, it failed, and he reinvested his remaining money as a silent, half-owner of a saloon. He went home to marry Eva Caten in 1884. (He had previously asked her father for her hand, but had been turned down—her father was a widower at the time and felt he needed Eva, but after he had remarried, was more amenable.) The young couple returned to Kansas City immediately. Eva was unhappy with his saloon life and was unimpressed by the sketches of saloon inhabitants that Remington regularly showed her. When his real occupation became known, she left him and returned to Ogdensburg. With his wife gone and with business doing badly, Remington started to sketch and paint in earnest, and bartered his sketches for essentials.

He soon had enough success selling his paintings to locals to see art as a real profession. Remington returned home again, his inheritance gone but his faith in his new career secured, reunited with his wife, and moved to Brooklyn. He began studies at the Art Students League of New York and significantly bolstered his fresh though still rough technique. His timing was excellent, as newspaper interest in the dying West was escalating. He submitted illustrations, sketches, and other works for publication with Western themes to Collier's and Harper's Weekly, as his recent Western experiences (highly exaggerated) and his hearty, breezy "cowboy" demeanor gained him credibility with the eastern publishers looking for authenticity. His first full-page cover under his own name appeared in Harper's Weekly on January 9, 1886, when he was twenty-five. With financial backing from his Uncle Bill, Remington was able to pursue his art career and support his wife.

Several of his relatives were also artists, including Indian portrait artist George Catlin, cowboy sculptor Earl W. Bascom, and (also on the Bascom side) Frank Tenney Johnson, the "father of western moonlight painting".

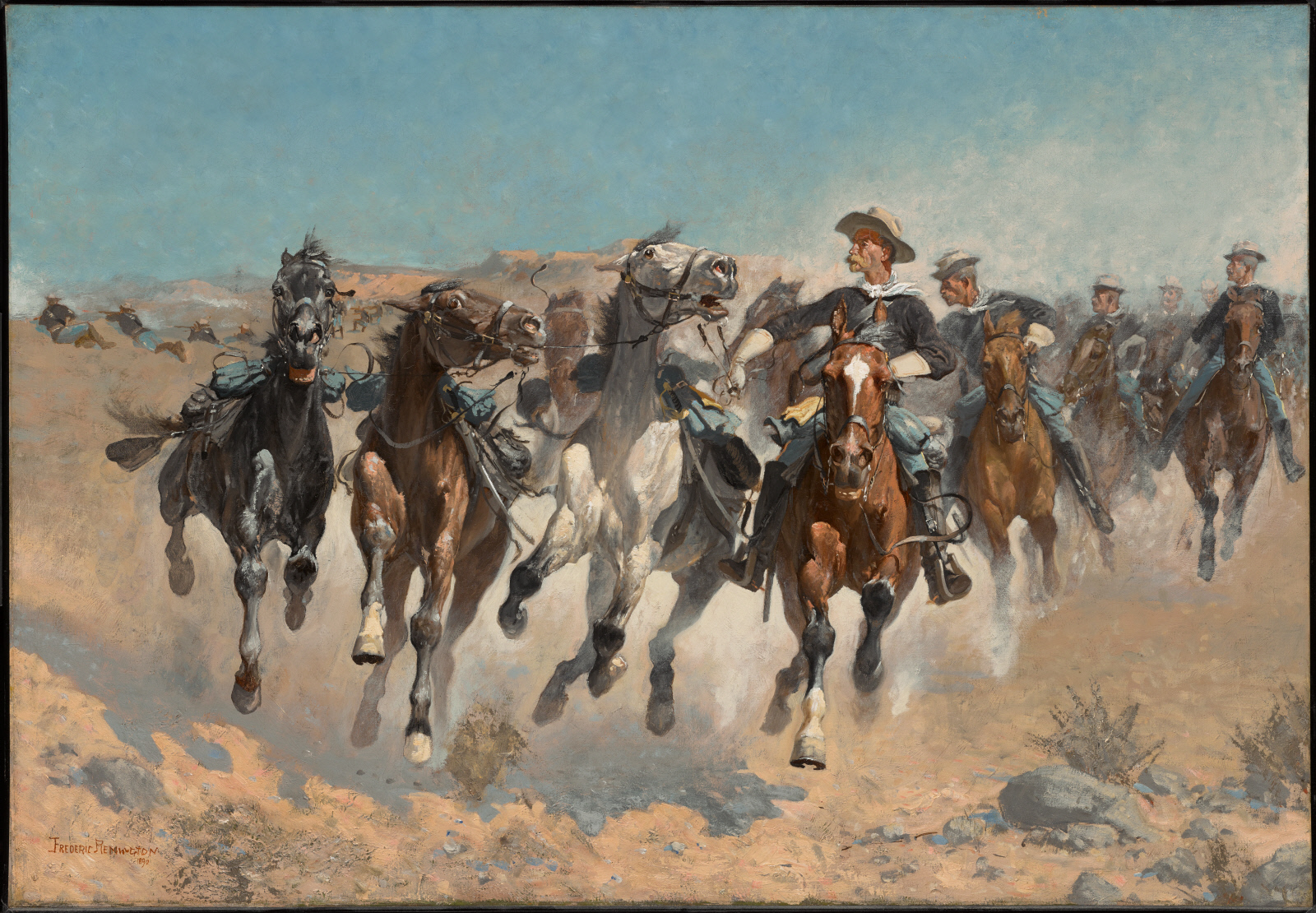
Dismounted: The Fourth Troopers Moving the Led Horses, an 1890 oil on canvas portrait by Remington now housed in the Clark Art Institute in Williamstown, Massachusetts

In 1886, Remington was sent to Arizona by Harper's Weekly on a commission as an artist-correspondent to cover the government's war against Geronimo. Although he never caught up with Geronimo, Remington did acquire many authentic artifacts to be used later as props, and made many photos and sketches valuable for later paintings. He also made notes on the true colors of the West, such as "shadows of horses should be a cool carmine & Blue", to supplement the black-and-white photos. Ironically, art critics later criticized his palette as "primitive and unnatural" even though it was based on actual observation.

After returning East, Remington was sent by Harper's Weekly to cover the 1886 Charleston earthquake. To expand his commission work, he also began doing drawings for Outing magazine. His first year as a commercial artist had been successful, earning Remington $1,200, almost triple that of a typical teacher. He had found his life's work and bragged to a friend, "That's a pretty good break for an ex cow-puncher to come to New York with $30 and catch on it 'art'."

For commercial reproduction in black-and-white, he produced ink and wash drawings. As he added watercolor, he began to sell his work in art exhibitions. His works were selling well but garnered no prizes, as the competition was strong and masters like Winslow Homer and Eastman Johnson were considered his superiors. A trip to Canada in 1887 produced illustrations of the Blackfoot, the Crow Nation, and the Canadian Mounties, which were eagerly enjoyed by the reading public.

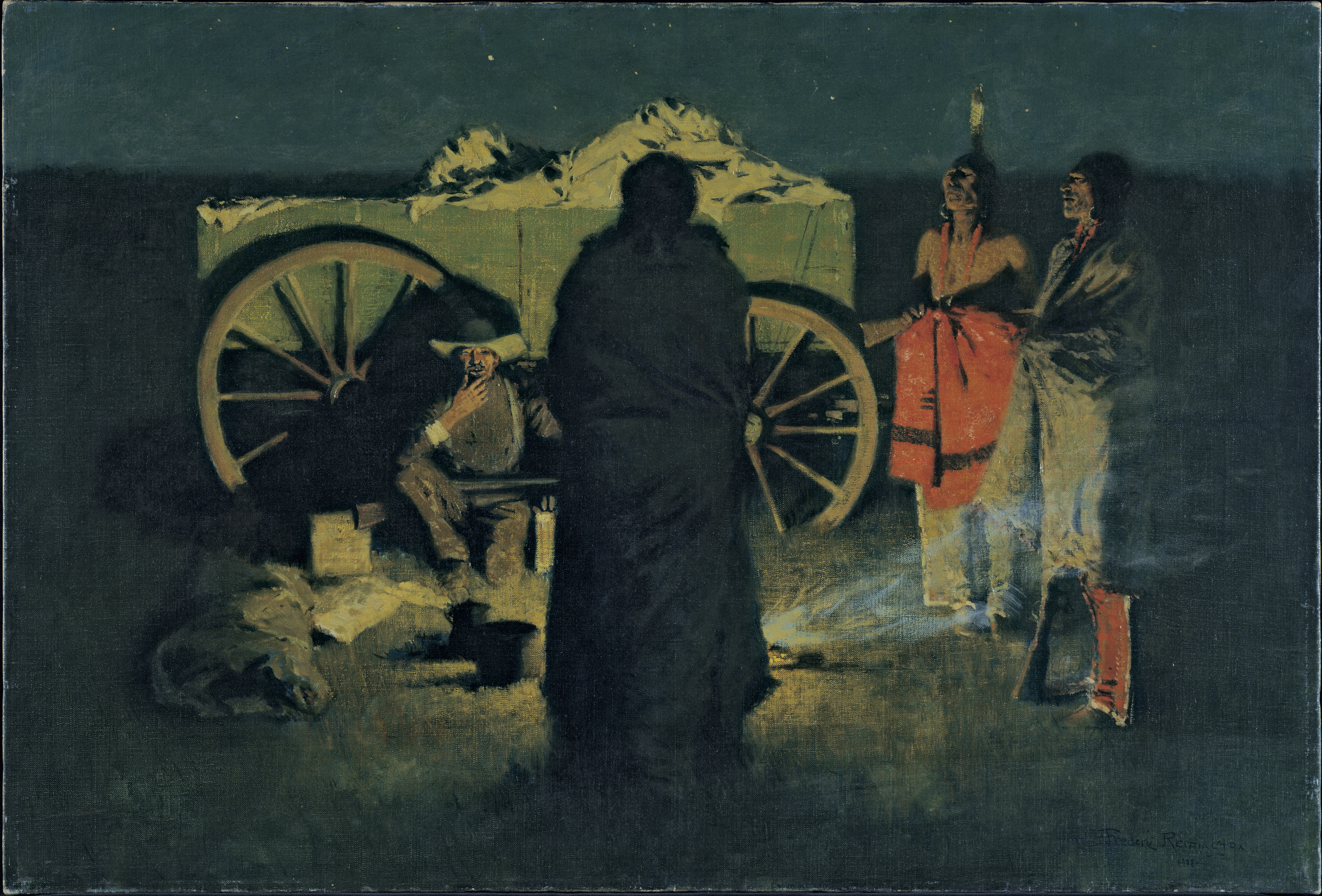
Shotgun Hospitality, 1908, oil on canvas, Hood Museum of Art, Dartmouth College, Hanover, New Hampshire

Later that year, Remington received a commission to do eighty-three illustrations for a book by Theodore Roosevelt, Ranch Life and the Hunting Trail to be serialized in The Century Magazine before publication. The 29-year-old Roosevelt had a similar Western adventure to Remington, losing money on a ranch in North Dakota the previous year but gaining experience which made him an "expert" on the West. The assignment gave Remington's career a big boost and forged a lifelong connection with Roosevelt.

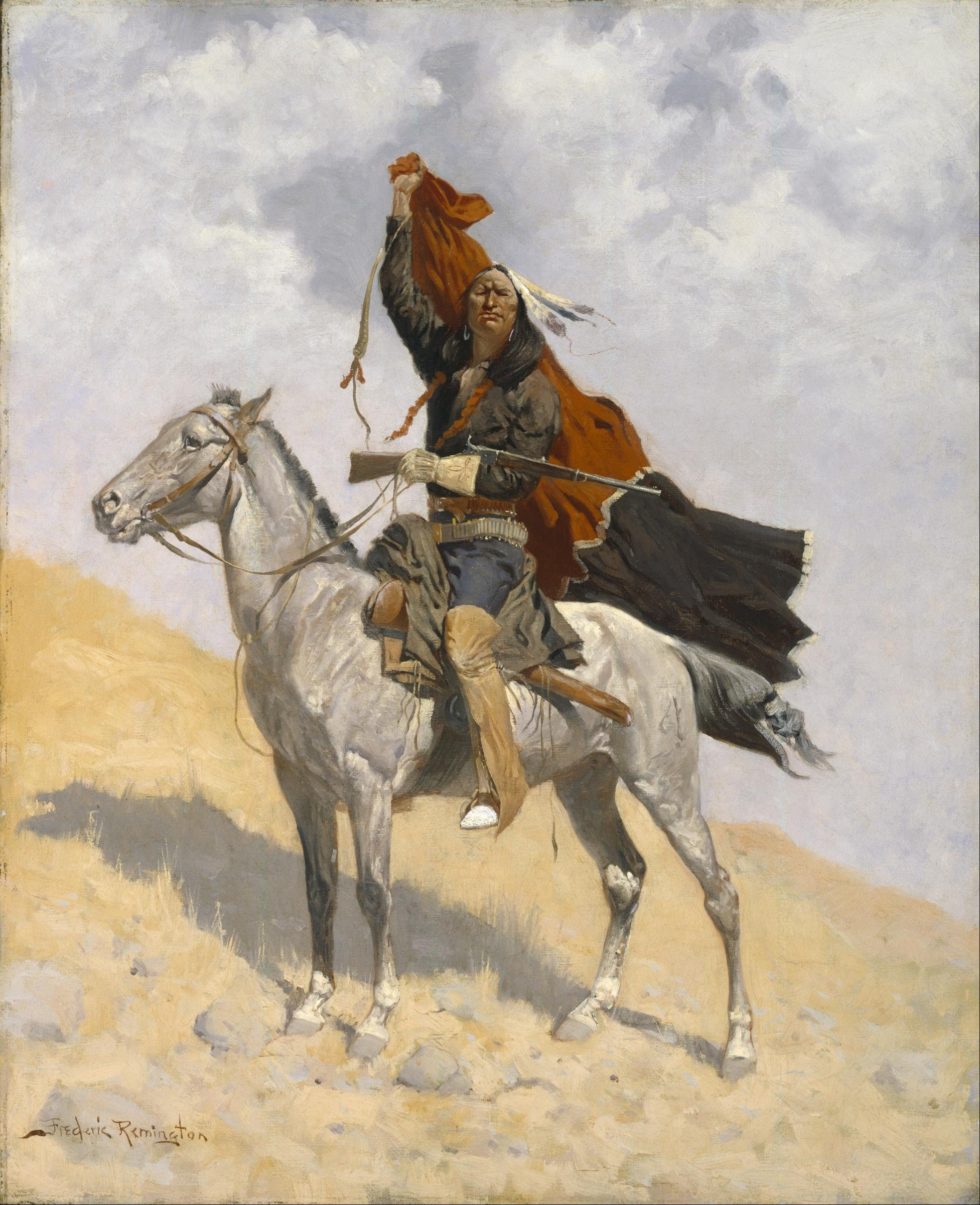
The Blanket Signal, 1894/1898

His full-color oil painting Return of the Blackfoot War Party was exhibited at the National Academy of Design and the New York Herald commented that Remington would "one day be listed among our great American painters". Though not admired by all critics, Remington's work was deemed "distinctive" and "modern". By now, he was demonstrating the ability to handle complex compositions with ease, as in Mule Train Crossing the Sierras (1888), and to show action from all points of view. His status as the new trendsetter in Western art was solidified in 1889 when he won a second-class medal at the Paris Exposition. He had been selected by the American committee to represent American painting, over Albert Bierstadt whose majestic, large-scale landscapes peopled with tiny figures of pioneers and Indians were by then considered passé.

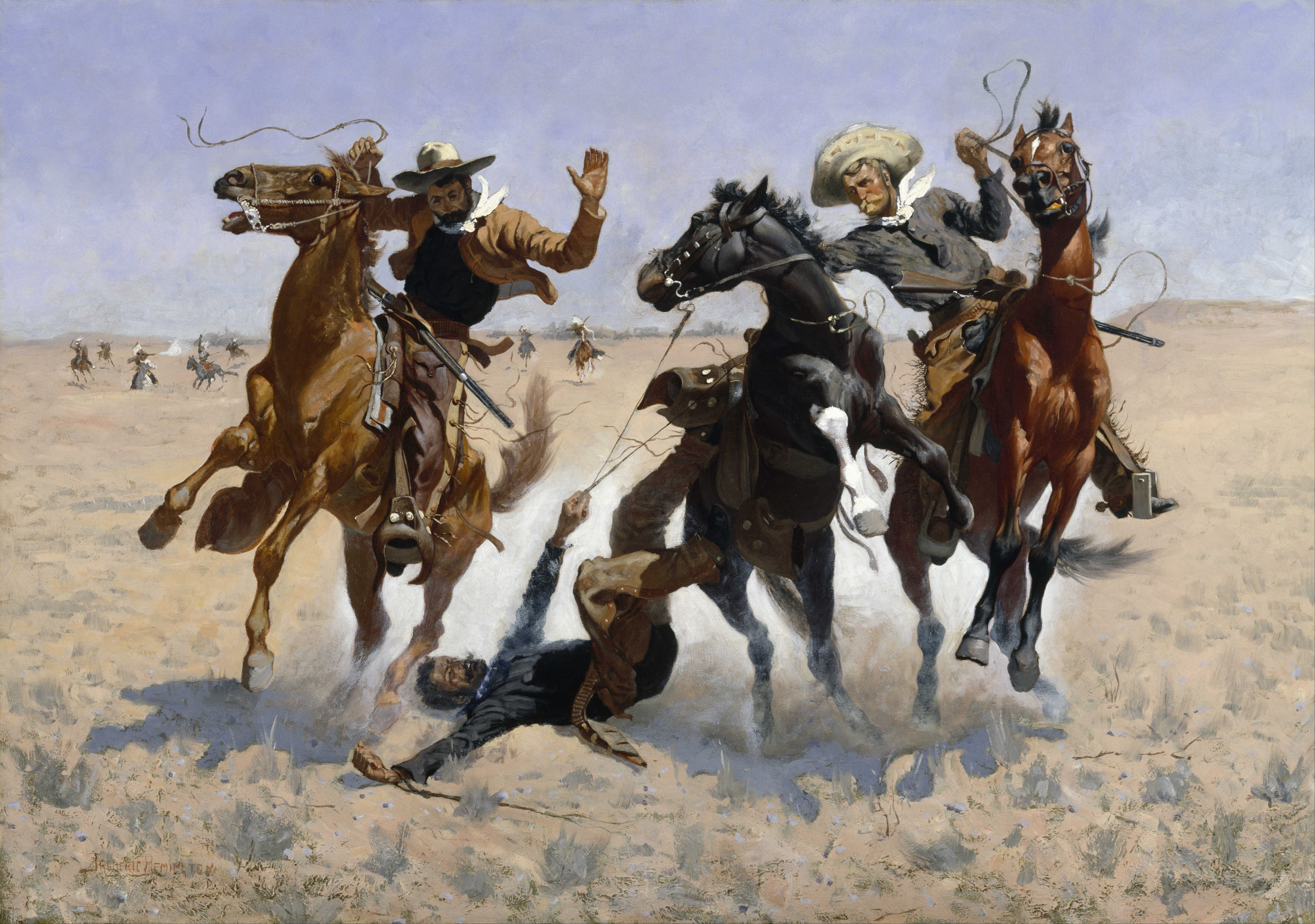
Aiding a Comrade, 1890

Around this time, Remington made a gentleman's agreement with Harper's Weekly, giving the magazine an informal first option on his output but maintaining Remington's independence to sell elsewhere if desired. As a bonus, the magazine launched a massive promotional campaign for Remington, stating that "He draws what he knows, and he knows what he draws." Though laced with blatant puffery (common for the time) claiming that Remington was a bona fide cowboy and Indian scout, the effect of the campaign was to raise Remington to the equal of the era's top illustrators, Howard Pyle and Charles Dana Gibson.

His first one-man show, in 1890, presented twenty-one paintings at the American Art Galleries and was very well received. With success all but assured, Remington became established in society. His personality, his "pseudo-cowboy" speaking manner, and his "Wild West" reputation were strong social attractions. His biography falsely promoted some of the myths he encouraged about his Western experiences.

Remington's regular attendance at celebrity banquets and stag dinners, however, though helpful to his career, fostered prodigious eating and drinking which caused his girth to expand alarmingly. Obesity became a constant problem for him from then on. Among his urban friends and fellow artists, he was "a man among men, a deuce of a good fellow" but notable because he (facetiously) "never drew but two women in his life, and they were failures" (this estimation failed to account for his female Native American subjects).

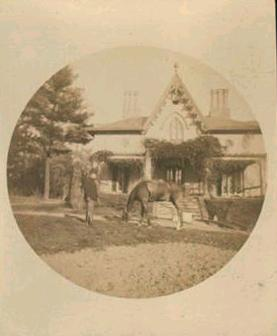
Remington estate 'Endion' in New Rochelle, New York. The Gothic-revival cottage was designed by Alexander J. Davis.

In 1890, Remington and his wife moved to New Rochelle, New York, to have both more living space and extensive studio facilities, and also with the hope of gaining more exercise. The community was close to New York City affording easy access to the publishing houses and galleries necessary for the artist, and also rural enough to provide him with the space he needed for horseback riding, and other physical activities that relieved the long hours of concentration required by his work. Moreover, an artists' colony had developed in the town, so that the Remingtons counted among their neighbors writers, actors, and artists such as Francis Wilson, Julian Hawthorne, Edward Kemble, and Augustus Thomas.

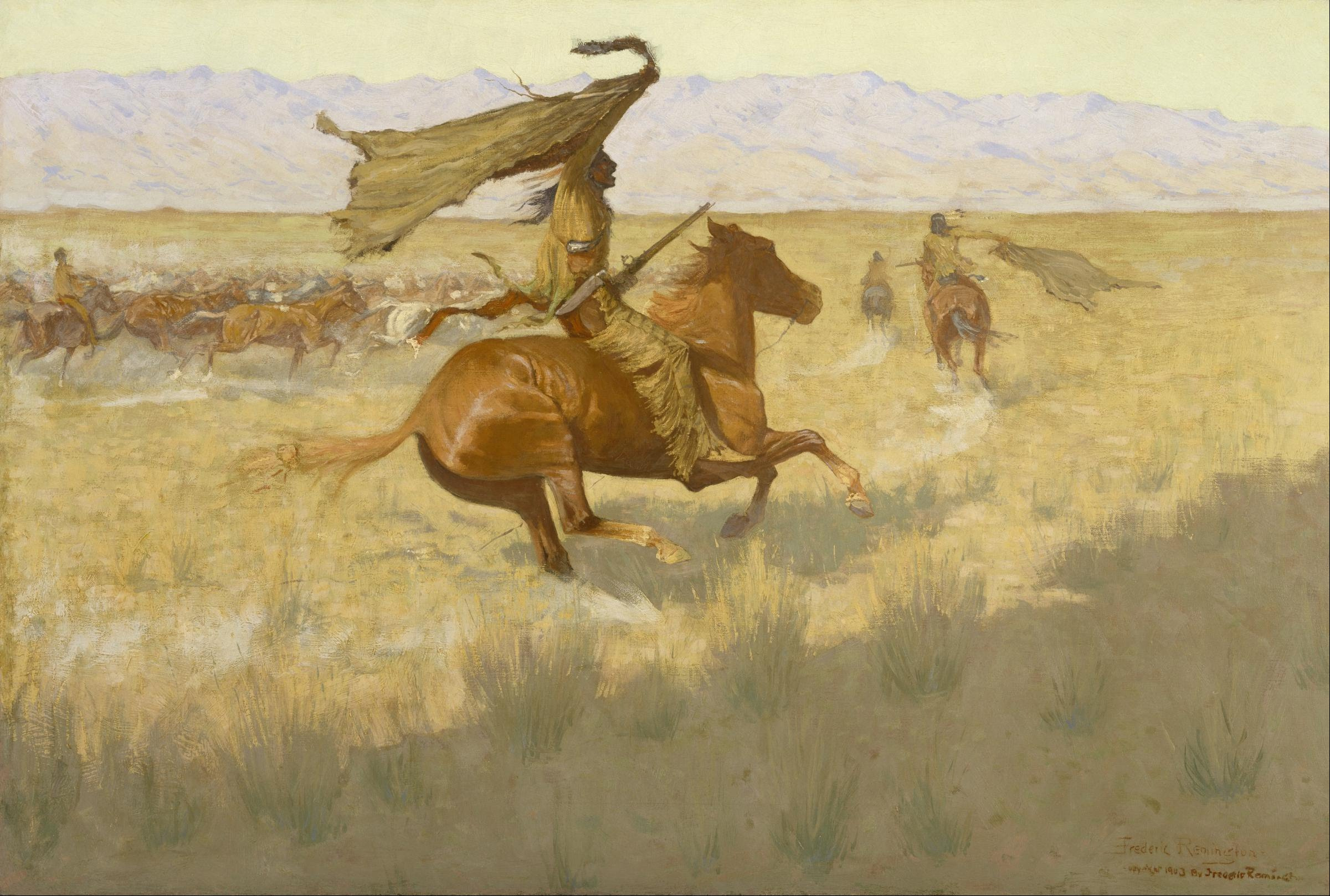
Frederic Sackrider Remington, The Stampede; Horse Thieves, 1909. Museum of Fine Arts, Houston

The Remingtons' substantial Gothic revival house was situated at 301 Webster Avenue, on a prestigious promontory known as Lathers Hill. A sweeping lawn rolled south toward Long Island Sound, providing views on three sides of the beautiful Westchester County countryside. Remington called it Endion, an Ojibwa word meaning "the place where I live". In the early years, no real studio existed at Endion and Remington did most of his work in a large attic under the home's front gable where he stored materials collected on his many western excursions. Later he used his library on the main floor, a larger, more comfortable room that soon took on the cluttered appearance of an atelier. However, neither situation was completely satisfactory: the space was limited, the light was less than adequate, and the surroundings were generally uninspiring. In the spring of 1896 Remington retained the New Rochelle architect O. William Degen to plan a studio addition to the house. An article in the New Rochelle Pioneer of April 26 touted the "fine architectural design" of the studio. Remington himself wrote to his friend the novelist Owen Wister:

Have concluded to build a butler's pantry and a studio (Czar size) on my house—we will be torn [up] for a month and then will ask you to come over—throw your eye on the march of improvement and say this is a great thing for American art. The fireplace is going to be like this.—Old Norman house—Big—big.

== Later career ==
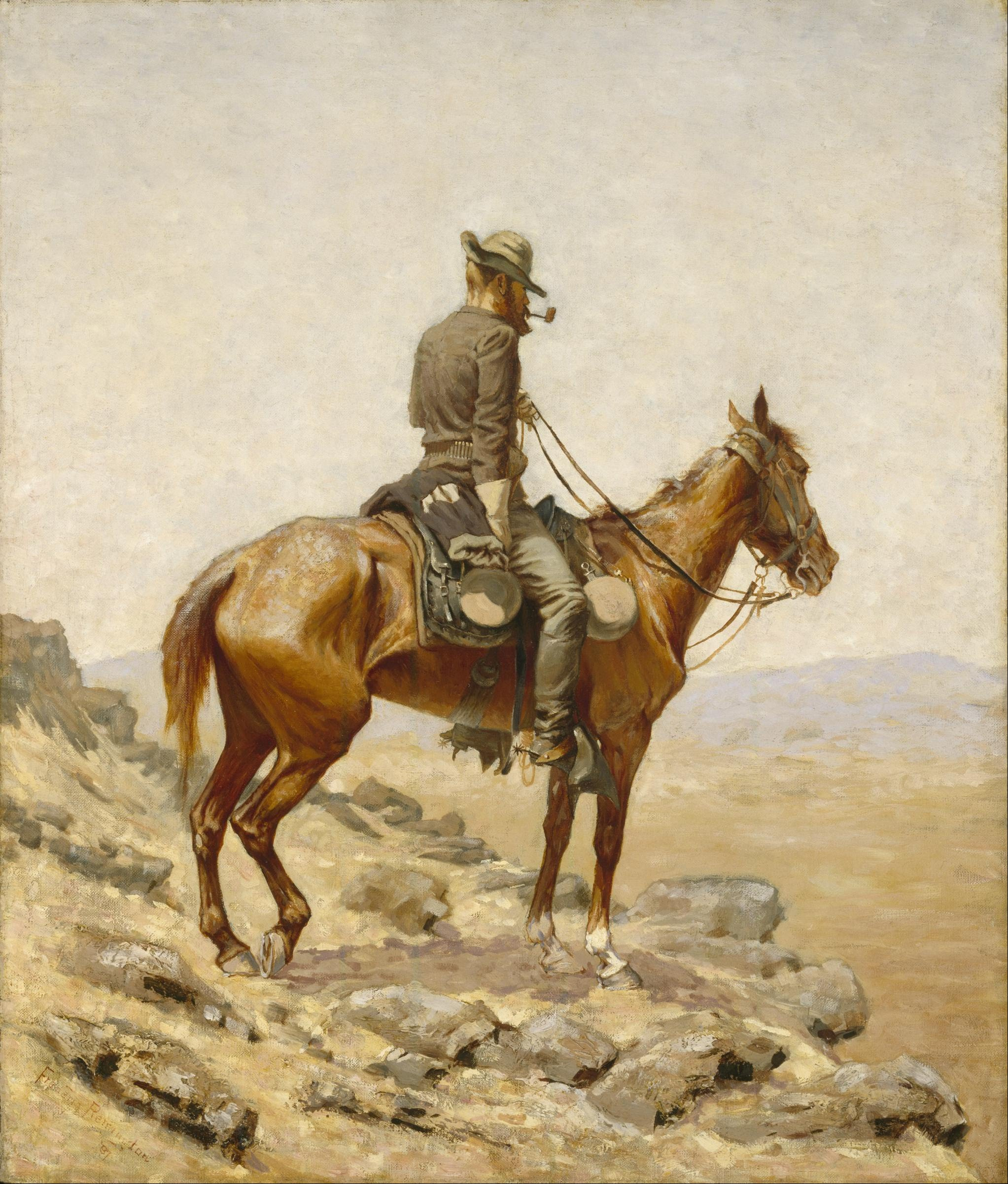
The Lookout, 1887

=== Further travels ===
Remington's fame made him a favorite of the Western Army officers fighting the last Native American battles. He was invited out West to make their portraits in the field and to gain them national publicity through Remington's articles and illustrations for Harper's Weekly, particularly General Nelson Miles, an Indian fighter who aspired to the presidency of the United States. In turn, Remington got exclusive access to the soldiers and their stories and boosted his reputation with the reading public as "The Soldier Artist". One of his 1889 paintings, A Dash for the Timber, depicts eight cavalrymen shooting at Apaches in the rear as they attempt to outrun the Indians. Another painting that year, Cavalry in an Arizona Sand-Storm, depicts cavalrymen in a sandstorm. Remington wrote that the "heat was awful and the dust rose in clouds. Men get sulky and go into a comatose state – the fine alkali dust penetrates everything but the canteens."

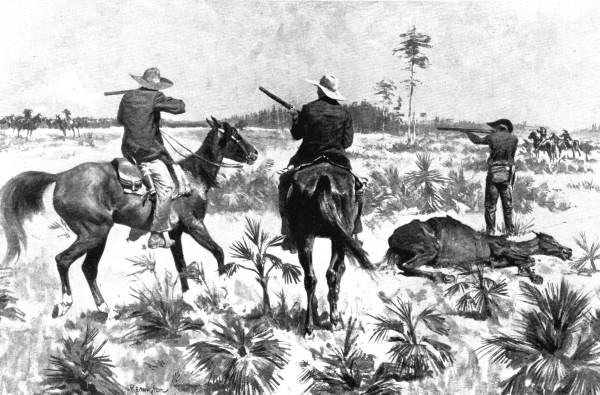
Fighting over a stolen herd, from his article "Cracker Cowboys of Florida", 1895

Remington arrived on the scene just after the 1890 massacre at Wounded Knee on the Pine Ridge Indian Reservation in South Dakota, in which 150 Sioux, mostly women and children, were killed. He reported the event as "The Sioux Outbreak in South Dakota", having hailed the Army's "heroic" actions toward the Indians. Some of the Miles paintings are monochromatic and have an almost "you-are-there" photographic quality, heightening the realism, as in The Parley (1898).

Remington's Self-Portrait on a Horse (1890) shows the artist as he had wished, not a stout Easterner weighing heavily on a horse, but a tough, lean cowboy heading for adventure with his trusty steed. It was the image his publishers worked hard to maintain as well. Historian David McCullough described Remington of that period as "a man of phenomenal appetite for good food and drink" and "a huge specimen of humanity", weighing perhaps 250 pounds (110 kg) for his 5 ft 9 in (175 cm) frame.

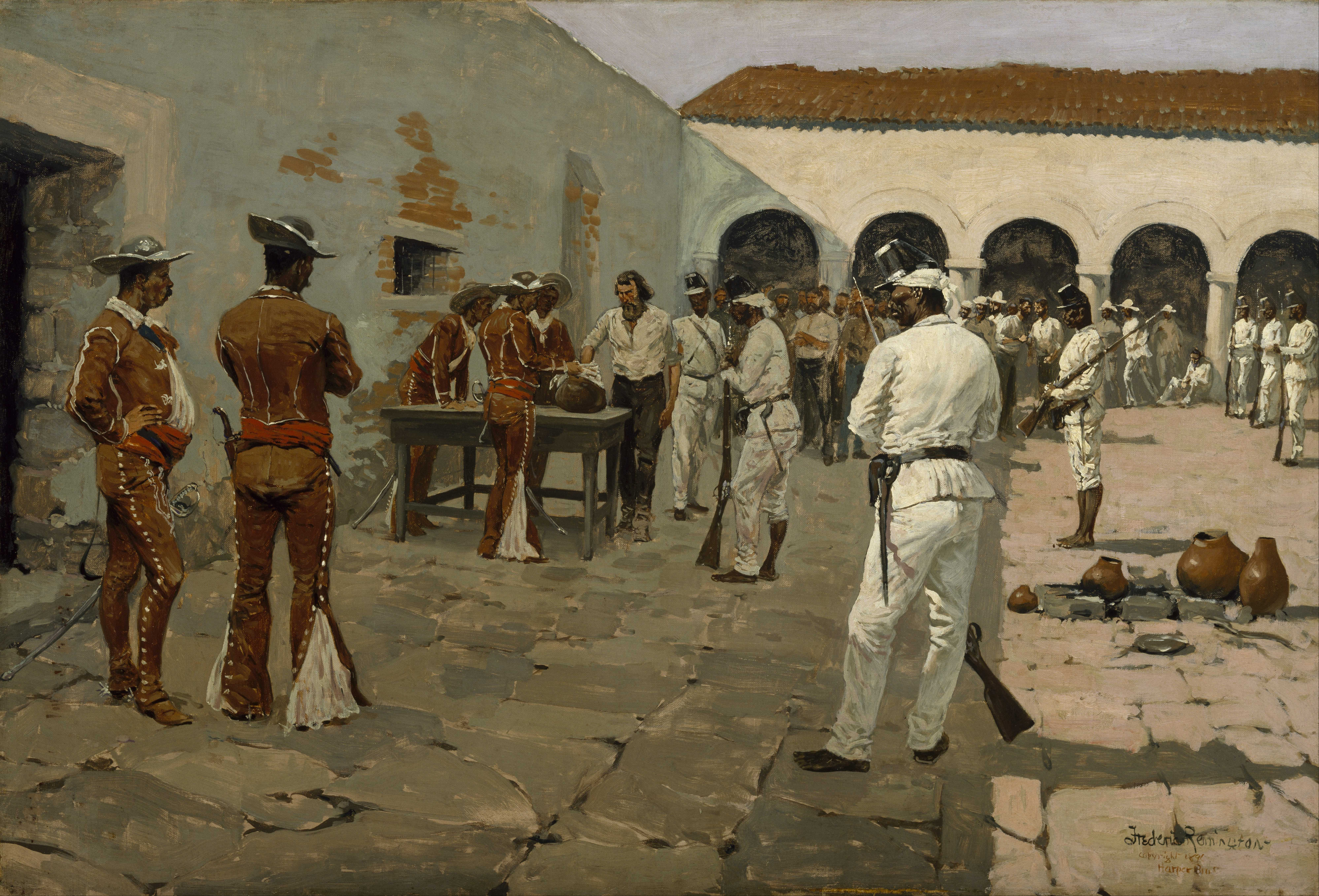
The Mier Expedition – The Drawing of the Black Bean, 1896, Museum of Fine Arts, Houston

In His Last Stand (1890), a cornered bear in the middle of a prairie is brought down by dogs and riflemen, which may have been a symbolized treatment of the dying Indians he had witnessed. Remington's attitude toward Native Americans was typical for the time. He thought them unfathomable, fearless, superstitious, ignorant and pitiless, and generally portrayed them as such. White men under attack were brave and noble.

Through the 1890s, Remington took frequent trips around the US, Mexico, and abroad to gather ideas for articles and illustrations, but his military and cowboy subjects always sold the best, even as the Old West was playing out. In 1892, he painted A Cavalryman's Breakfast on the Plains. In 1895 Remington headed south and his illustrations and article on the "Florida crackers" (cowboys) were published by Harper's magazine. Gradually, he transitioned from the premiere chronicler-artist of the Old West to its most important historian-artist. He formed an effective partnership with Owen Wister, who became the leading writer of Western stories at the time. Having more confidence of his craft, Remington wrote, "My drawing is done entirely from memory. I never use a camera now. The interesting never occurs in nature as a whole, but in pieces. It's more what I leave out than what I add." Remington's focus continued on outdoor action and he rarely depicted scenes in gambling and dance halls typically seen in Western movies. He avoided frontier women as well. His painting A Misdeal (1897) is a rare instance of indoor cowboy violence.

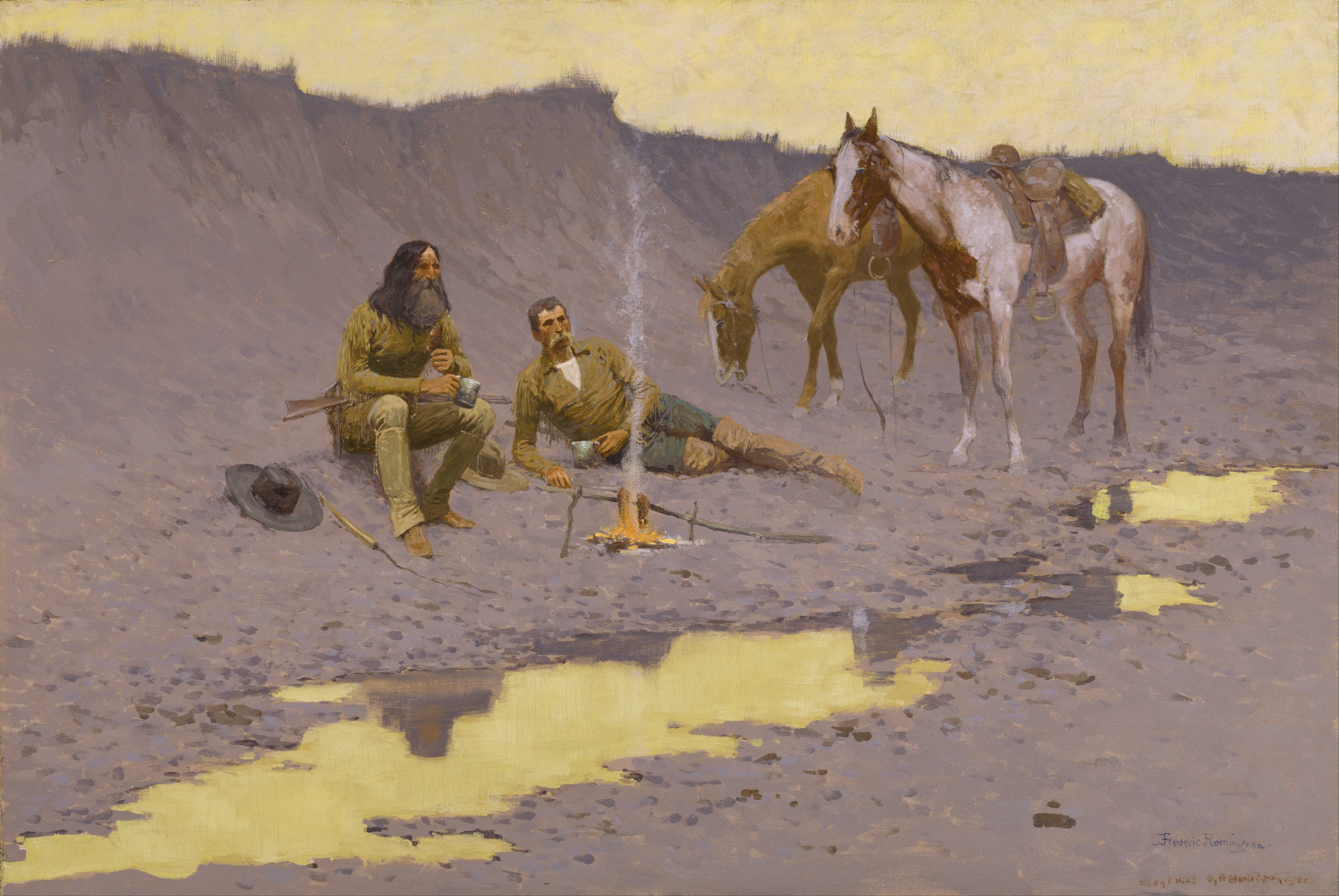
A New Year on the Cimarron, 1903, Museum of Fine Arts, Houston

Remington had developed a sculptor's 360-degree sense of vision but until a chance remark by playwright Augustus Thomas in 1895, Remington had not yet conceived of himself as a sculptor and thought of it as a separate art for which he had no training or aptitude. With help from friend and sculptor Frederick Ruckstull, Remington constructed his first armature and clay model, a "broncho buster" on a horse that was rearing on its hind legs—technically a very challenging subject. After several months, the novice sculptor overcame the difficulties and had a plaster cast made, then bronze copies, which were sold at Tiffany's. Remington was ecstatic about his new line of work, and though critical response was mixed, some labelling it negatively as "illustrated sculpture", it was a successful first effort earning him $6,000 over three years.

During that busy year, Remington became further immersed in military matters, inventing a new type of ammunition carrier; but his patented invention was not accepted for use by the War Department. His favorite subject for magazine illustration was now military scenes, though he admitted, "Cowboys are cash with me". Sensing the political mood of that time, he was looking forward to a military conflict which would provide the opportunity to be a heroic war correspondent, giving him both new subject matter and the excitement of battle. He was growing bored with routine illustration, and he wrote to Howard Pyle, the dean of American illustrators, that he had "done nothing but potboil of late". (Earlier, he and Pyle, in a gesture of mutual respect, had exchanged paintings: Pyle's painting of a dead pirate for Remington's of a rough and ready cowpuncher). He was still working very hard and spending seven days a week in his studio.

Remington was further irritated by the lack of his acceptance to regular membership by the academy, likely because of his image as a popular, cocky, and ostentatious artist. Remington kept up his contact with celebrities and politicos, and continued to woo Theodore Roosevelt, now the New York City Police Commissioner, by sending him complimentary editions of new works. Despite Roosevelt's great admiration for Remington, he never purchased a Remington painting or drawing.

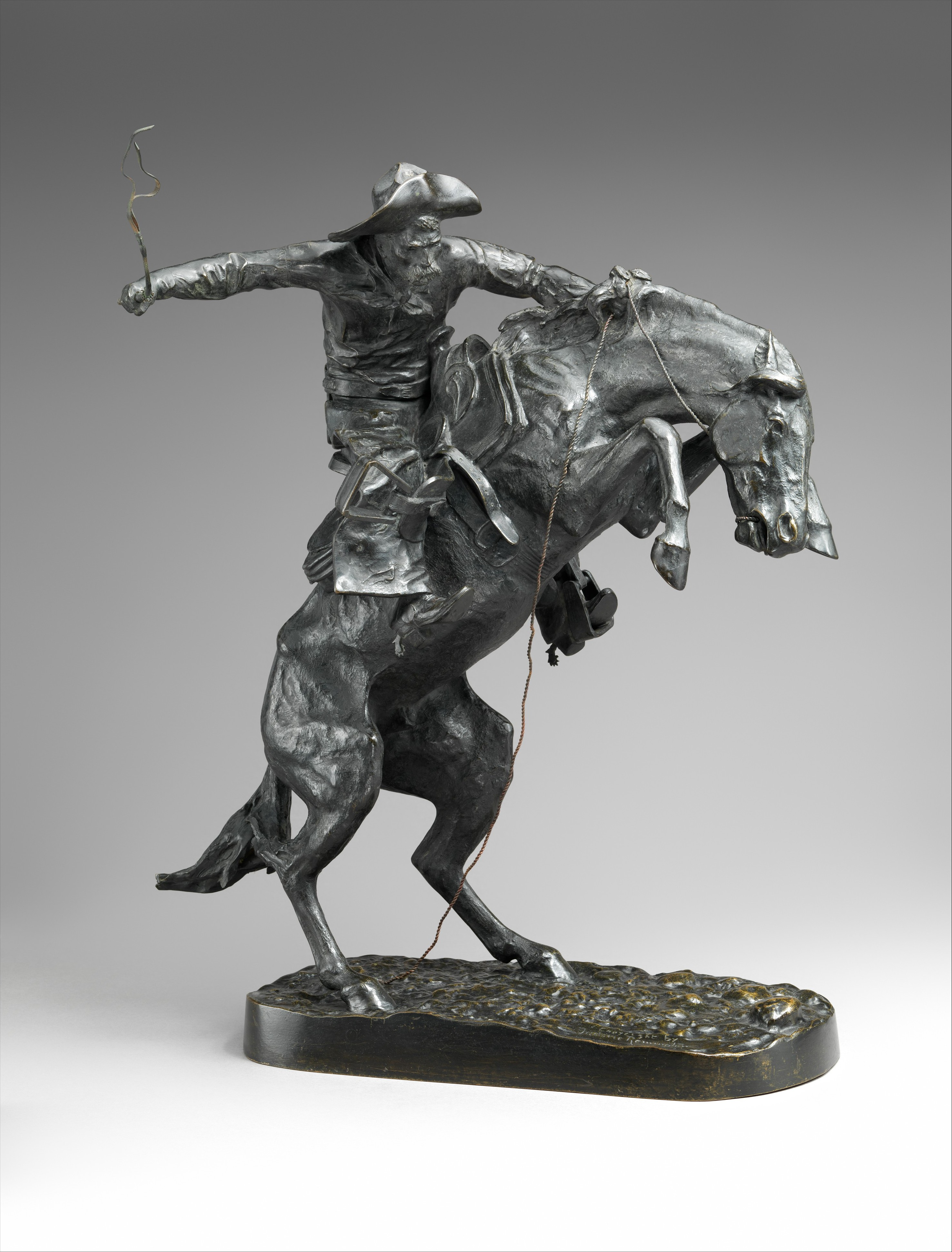
The Broncho Buster, 1895, bronze, limited edition

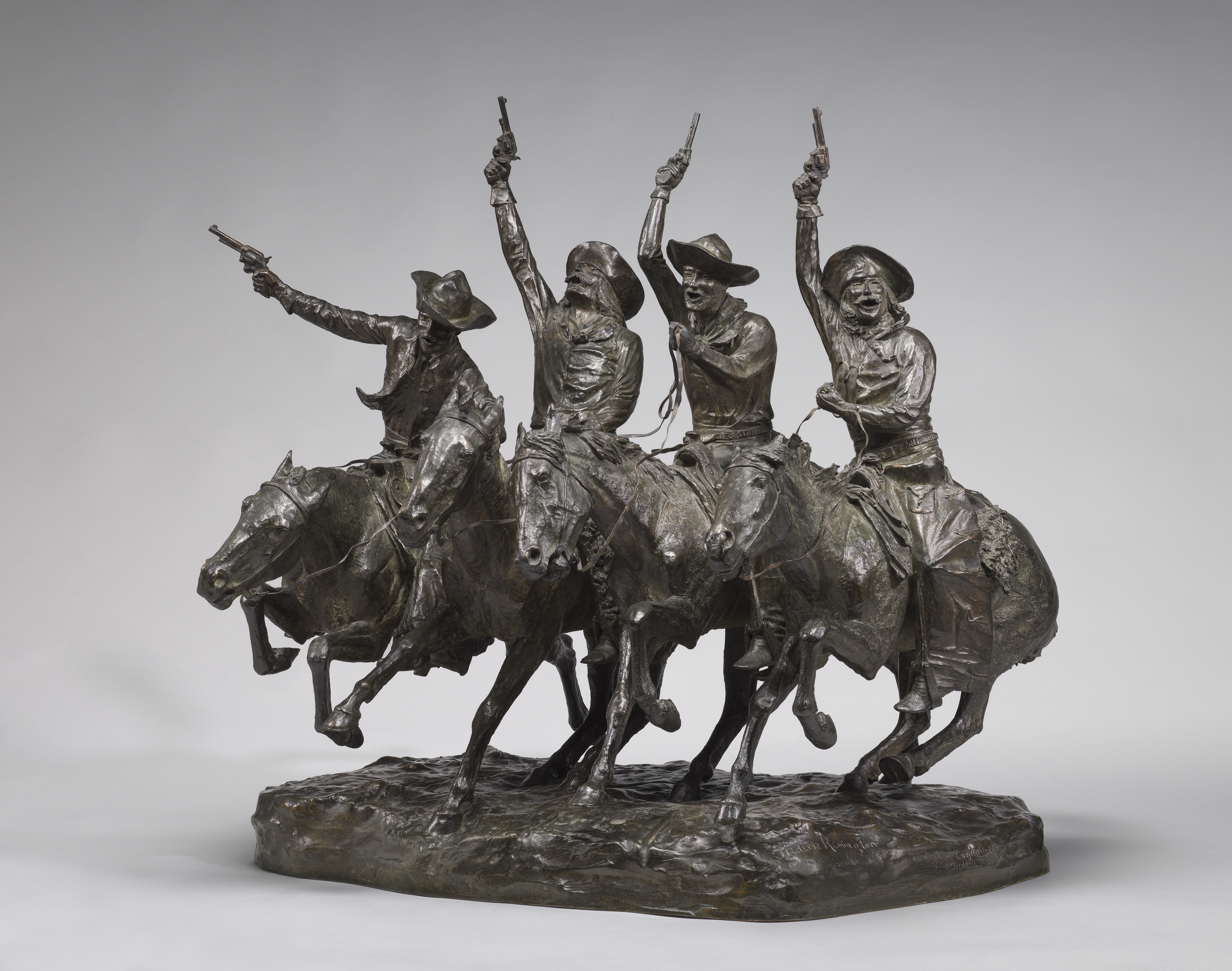
Off the Range (Coming Through the Rye), model 1902, cast 1903, National Gallery of Art

=== Cuba ===
Remington's association with Roosevelt paid off, however, when the artist was hired as a war correspondent and illustrator for William Randolph Hearst's New York Journal in January 1897. Remington was sent down to Cuba in company with celebrity journalist Richard Harding Davis, another friend and supporter of Roosevelt. Cuba's apparent peacefulness left them nothing to report on. That led to this famous but probably apocryphal exchange of telegrams between Remington and Hearst:

"Everything is quiet. There is no trouble. There will be no war. I wish to return."

"Please remain. You furnish the pictures and I'll furnish the war."

Remington did return to New Rochelle while Davis remained until February, when he booked return passage on the P&O steamer Olivette. Aboard the ship, he met Clemencia Arango, who said her brother was a colonel in the insurgence, that she had been deported for her revolutionary activities, and that she had been strip searched by the Spanish officials before boarding. Shocked by her story, Davis dispatched this news from Tampa to Hearst on the 10th. The front page of the Journal for the 12th was dominated by Remington's sensationalist illustration, run across five columns of newsprint, of Arango stripped naked on the ship's deck, in public, surrounded by three male Spanish officials. Hearst deemed it the "Olivette Incident". The issue sold a record number of copies, almost a million, partly on the strength of Remington's image of a naked humiliated female resistance fighter. The next day Arango called Remington's version largely a fabrication, saying that only a single female police matron had inspected her, and in a private setting.

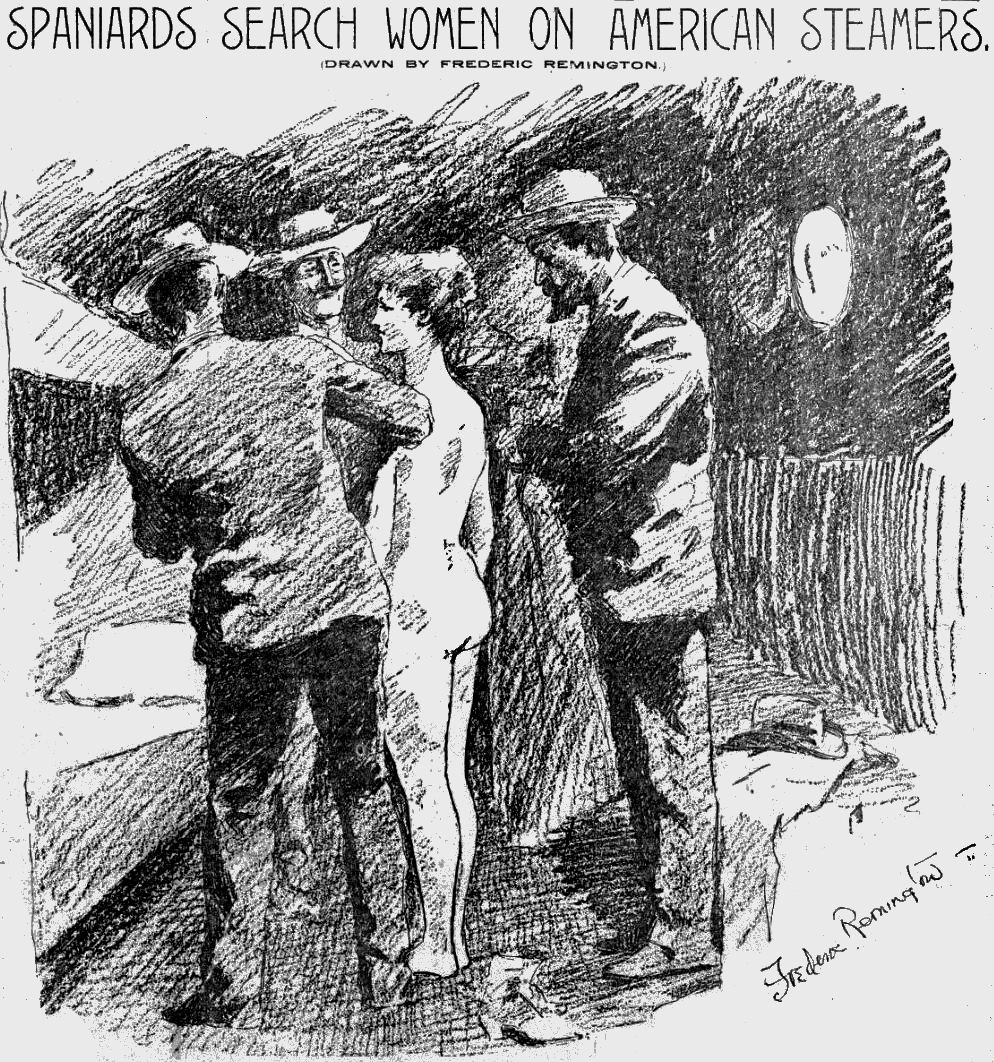
Spaniards Search Women on American Steamers, 1897

Two days later, on the 15th, the USS Maine exploded. As the Spanish–American War took shape into April, the artist returned to Cuba to see military action for the first time. It was the "most wrenching, disillusioning experience of Remington's life." As he witnessed the assault on San Juan Hill by American forces, including those led by Roosevelt, his heroic conception of war was shattered by the actual horror of jungle fighting and the deprivations he faced in camp. His reports and illustrations upon his return focused not on heroic generals but also on the troops, as in his Scream of the Shrapnel (1899), which depicts a deadly ambush on American troops by an unseen enemy.

When the Rough Riders returned to the US, they presented their courageous leader Roosevelt with Remington's bronze statuette, The Bronco Buster, which the artist proclaimed, "the greatest compliment I ever had.... After this everything will be mere fuss." Roosevelt responded, "There could have been no more appropriate gift from such a regiment."

=== After 1900 ===
In 1898, he achieved the public honor of having two paintings used for reproduction on US Postal stamps. In 1900, Remington purchased an island on the U.S. side of the St. Lawrence River that he called Ingleneuk, which he used as a summer residence.

“It is given to few men to live Crusoe-like on an island all their own; but Remington besides possessing his own island has augmented the boon with a substantial cottage, studio and outbuildings and lives part from the herding crowd like a feudal lord of old. You cannot possibly disturb him at his work; you could not even located this ‘Ingleneuk’ unless piloted to it. There are only five acres of it, but it is an impregnable stronghold and is, as the artist himself describes it, ‘the finest place on earth…’ Here Remington works all summer… I asked him for a photograph of the house at ‘Ingleneuk.’ ‘Bless your soul,’ he replied, ‘it couldn’t be photographed at any angle; it is solidly screen from view on all sides by the densest growth of trees along the St. Lawrence.’” (reporter Perriton Maxwell in the October 1907 issue of Pearson’s Magazine)

In 1900, as an economy move, Harper's dropped Remington as their star artist. To compensate for the loss of work, Remington wrote and illustrated a full-length novel, The Way of an Indian, which was intended for serialization by a Hearst publication but was not published until five years later in Cosmopolitan. Remington's protagonist, a Cheyenne named Fire Eater, is a prototype Native American as viewed by Remington and many of his time.

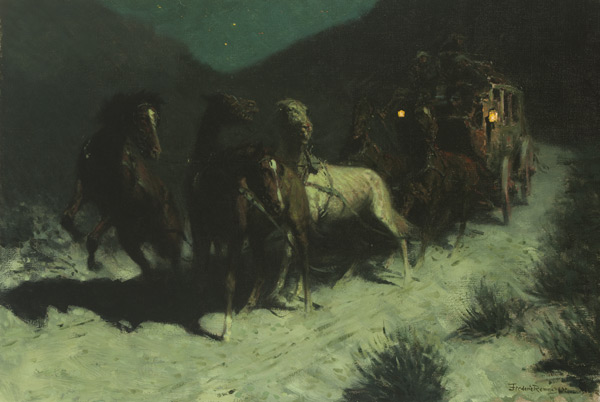
A Taint on the Wind, 1906, Oil on canvas, Sid Richardson Museum, Fort Worth, Texas

Remington then returned to sculpture and produced his first works produced by the lost wax method, a higher-quality process than the earlier sand casting method, which he had employed. By 1901, Collier's was buying Remington's illustrations on a steady basis. As his style matured, Remington portrayed his subjects in every light of day. His nocturnal paintings, very popular in his late life, such as A Taint on the Wind, Scare in the Pack Train and Fired On, are more impressionistic and loosely painted and focus on an unseen threat.

Remington completed another novel in 1902, John Ermine of the Yellowstone, a modest success but a definite disappointment as it was completely overshadowed by the bestseller The Virginian, written by his sometime collaborator Owen Wister, which became a classic Western novel. A stage play based on John Ermine failed in 1904. After John Ermine, Remington decided he would soon quit writing and illustrating (he had drawn over 2700 illustrations) to focus on sculpture and painting.

In 1903, Remington painted His First Lesson, set on an American-owned ranch in Chihuahua, Mexico. The hands wear heavy chaps, starched white shirts, and slouch-brimmed hats. In his paintings, Remington sought to let his audience "take away something to think about – to imagine." In 1905, Remington had a major publicity coup when Collier's devoted an entire issue to the artist, showcasing his latest works. It was that same year that the president of the Fairmount Park Art Association (now the Association for Public Art) commissioned Remington to create a large sculpture of a cowboy for Philadelphia's Fairmount Park, which was erected in 1908 on a jutting rock along Kelly Drive, a site that Remington had specifically chosen for the piece after he had a horseman pose for him in the exact location. Philadelphia's Cowboy (1908) was Remington's first and only large-scale bronze, and the sculpture is one of the earliest examples of site-specific art in the United States.

Remington's Explorers series, depicting older historical events in Western US history, did not fare well with the public or the critics. The financial panic of 1907 caused a slow down in his sales and in 1908, fantasy artists, such as Maxfield Parrish, became popular with the public and with commercial sponsors. Remington tried to sell his home in New Rochelle to get further away from urbanization. One night, he made a bonfire in his yard and burned dozens of his oil paintings that had been used for magazine illustration (worth millions of dollars today) to make an emphatic statement that he was done with illustration forever. He wrote that "there is nothing left but my landscape studies."

Near the end of his life, he moved to Ridgefield, Connecticut. In his final two years, under the influence of The Ten, he was veering more heavily to Impressionism, and he regretted that he was studio bound (by virtue of his declining health) and could not follow his peers, who painted "plein air".

Remington died after an emergency appendectomy led to peritonitis on December 26, 1909. His extreme obesity (of nearly 300 lbs = 136,1 kg) had complicated the anesthesia and the surgery, and chronic appendicitis was cited in the postmortem examination as an underlying factor in his death.

After Remington's death, his wife, Eva, moved to a home in Ogdensburg, NY (her hometown), which was made possible through the generosity of George Hall, an Ogdensburg industrialist, and John Howard, a friend of the Remingtons. Eva lived there with her sister, Emma, from 1915 to her death in 1918. While there, Eva managed Remington's copyrights and production of sculptures. She also worked to establish a permanent memorial to her husband, which became a reality after her death when the Remington Art Memorial was established in her Ogdensburg home in 1923—today, the Frederic Remington Art Museum.

The Frederic Remington House was declared a National Historic Landmark in 1965. He was the great-uncle of the artist Deborah Remington. In 2009, the United States Congress enacted legislation renaming the historic Post Office in Ogdensburg, New York, the Frederic Remington Post Office Building.

== Style and influence ==
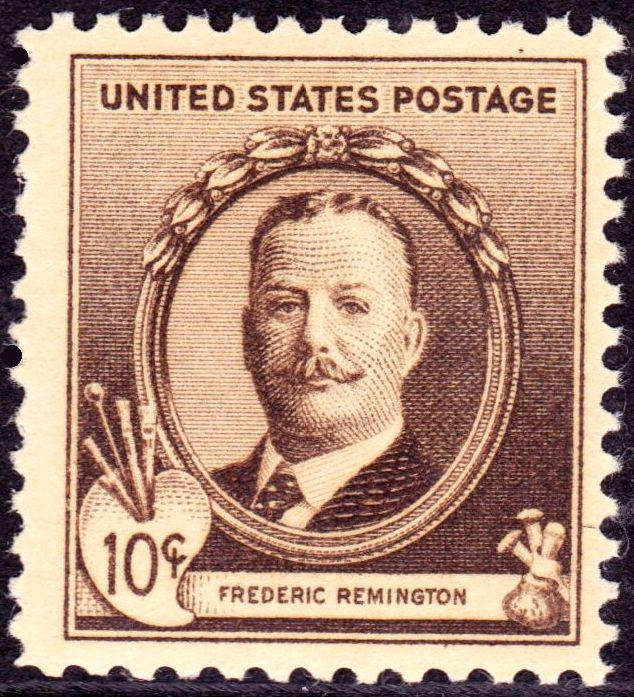
Remington was honored in the Famous Americans Series postal Issues of 1940

Remington was the most successful Western illustrator in the "Golden Age" of illustration at the end of the 19th century and the beginning of the 20th century, so much so that the other Western artists such as Charles Russell and Charles Schreyvogel were known during Remington's life as members of the "School of Remington". His style was naturalistic, sometimes impressionistic, and usually veered away from the ethnographic realism of earlier Western artists such as George Catlin. His focus was firmly on the people and animals of the West, portraying men almost exclusively, and the landscape was usually of secondary importance, unlike the members and descendants of the contemporary Hudson River School, such as Frederic Edwin Church, Albert Bierstadt, and Thomas Moran, who glorified the vastness of the West and the dominance of nature over man. He took artistic liberties in his depictions of human action, also for the sake of his readers' and publishers' interest. Though always confident in his subject matter, Remington was less sure about his colors, and critics often harped on his palette, but his lack of confidence drove him to experiment and produce a great variety of effects, some very true to nature and some imagined.

His collaboration with Owen Wister on The Evolution of the Cowpuncher, published by Harper's Monthly in September 1893, was the first statement of the mythical cowboy in American literature, spawning the entire genre of Western fiction, films, and theater that followed. Remington provided the concept of the project, its factual content, and its illustrations and Wister supplied the stories, sometimes altering Remington's ideas. (Remington's prototype cowboys were Mexican rancheros but Wister made the American cowboys descendants of Saxons. In truth, they were both partially right, as the first American cowboys were both the ranchers who tended the cattle and horses of the American Revolutionary Army on Long Island and the Mexicans who ranched in the Arizona and California territories.)

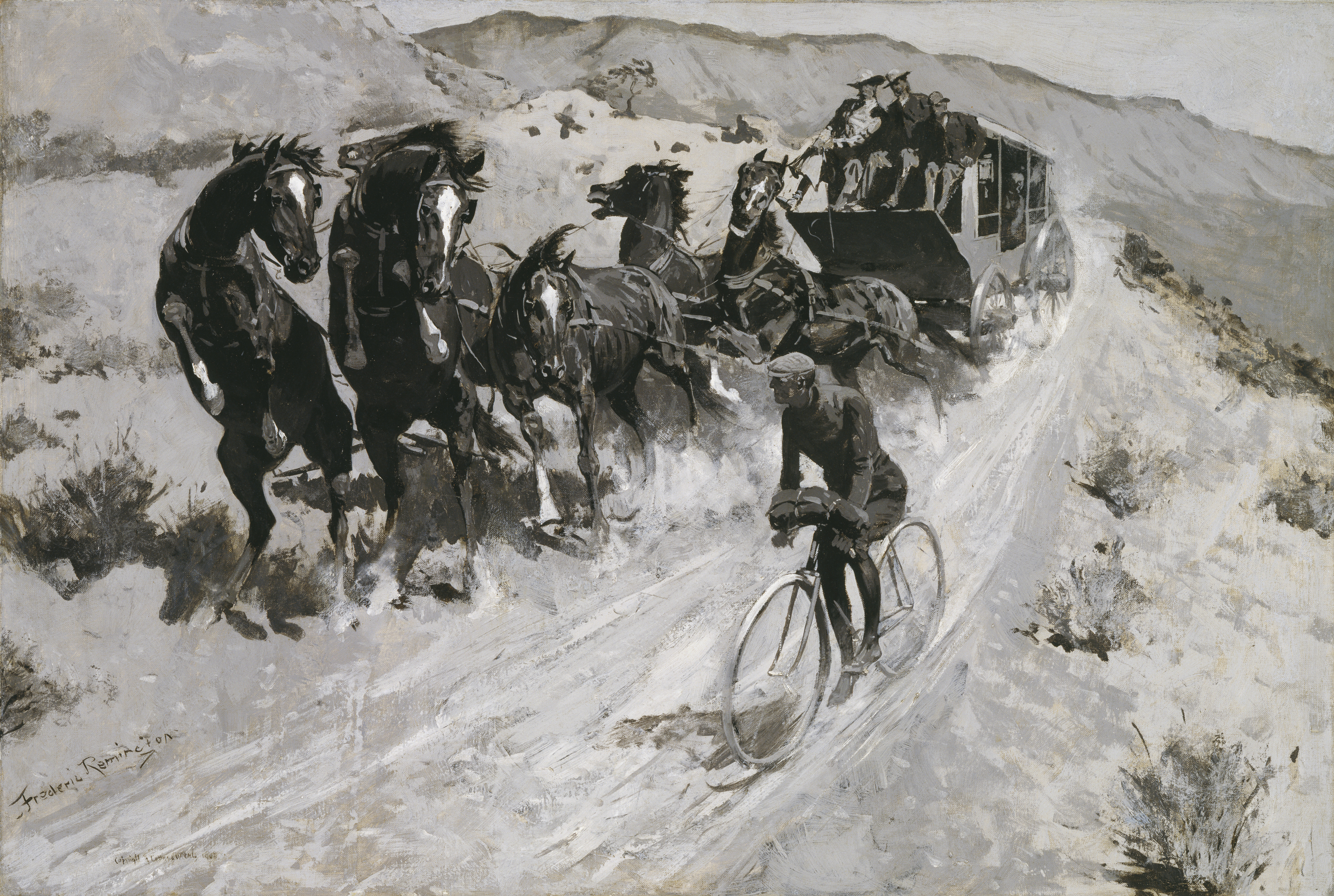
The Right of the Road – A Hazardous Encounter on a Rocky Mountain Trail; 1900; Oil on canvas; Amon Carter Museum of American Art, Fort Worth, Texas, Amon G. Carter Collection; 1961.246

Remington was one of the first American artists to illustrate the true gait of the horse in motion (along with Thomas Eakins), as validated by the famous sequential photographs of Eadweard Muybridge. Previously, horses in full gallop were usually depicted with all four legs pointing out, like "hobby horses". The galloping horse became Remington's signature subject, which was copied and interpreted by many Western artists who followed him to adopt the correct anatomical motion. Though criticized by some for his use of photography, Remington often created depictions that slightly exaggerated natural motion to satisfy the eye. He wrote that "the artist must know more than the camera... (the horse must be) incorrectly drawn from the photographic standpoint (to achieve the desired effect)."

Also, noteworthy was Remington's invention of "cowboy" sculpture. From his inaugural piece, The Broncho Buster (1895), he created an art form which is still very popular among collectors of Western art. He has been called the "Father of Cowboy Sculpture".

An early advocate of the photoengraving process over wood engraving for magazine reproduction of illustrative art, Remington became an accepted expert in reproduction methods, which helped gain him strong working relationships with editors and printers. Furthermore, Remington's skill as a businessman was equal to his artistry, unlike many other artists who relied on their spouses or business agents or no one at all to run their financial affairs. He was an effective publicist and promoter of his art. He insisted for his originals to be handled carefully and returned to him in pristine condition (without editor's marks) so that he could sell them. He carefully regulated his output to maximize his income and kept detailed notes about his works and his sales. In 1991, the PBS series American Masters filmed a documentary of Remington's life, Frederic Remington: The Truth of Other Days, which was produced and directed by Tom Neff.

Remington was portrayed by Nick Chinlund in the TNT miniseries Rough Riders (1997), which depicts the Spanish–American War and shows Remington's time as a war correspondent and his partnership with William Randolph Hearst (portrayed by George Hamilton).

== Selected works ==
Selected works

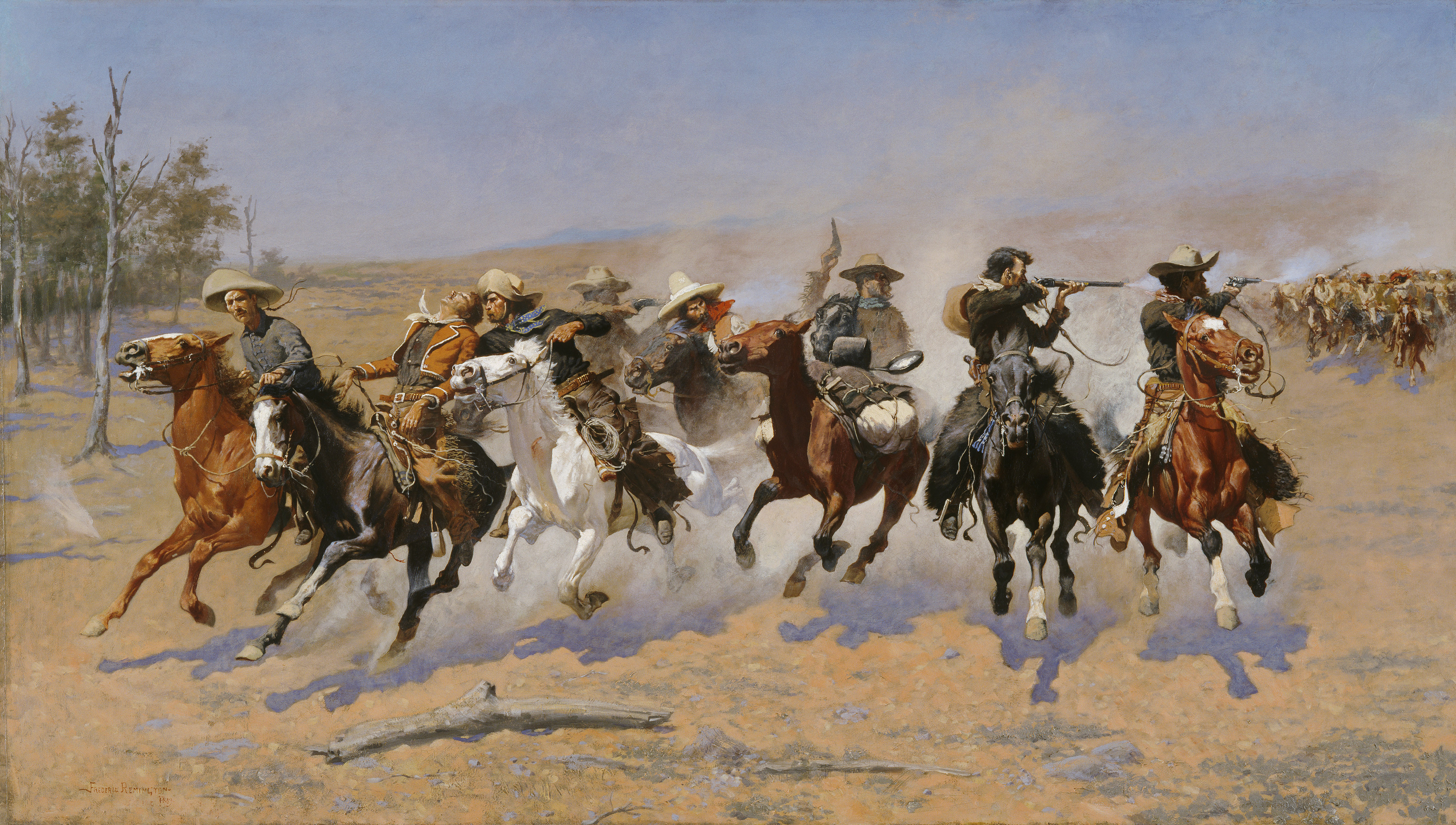
A Dash for the Timber, 1889, depicts cowboys in the Southwest shooting at Apaches in the rear. One of the eight riders is already wounded but remains on his horse.

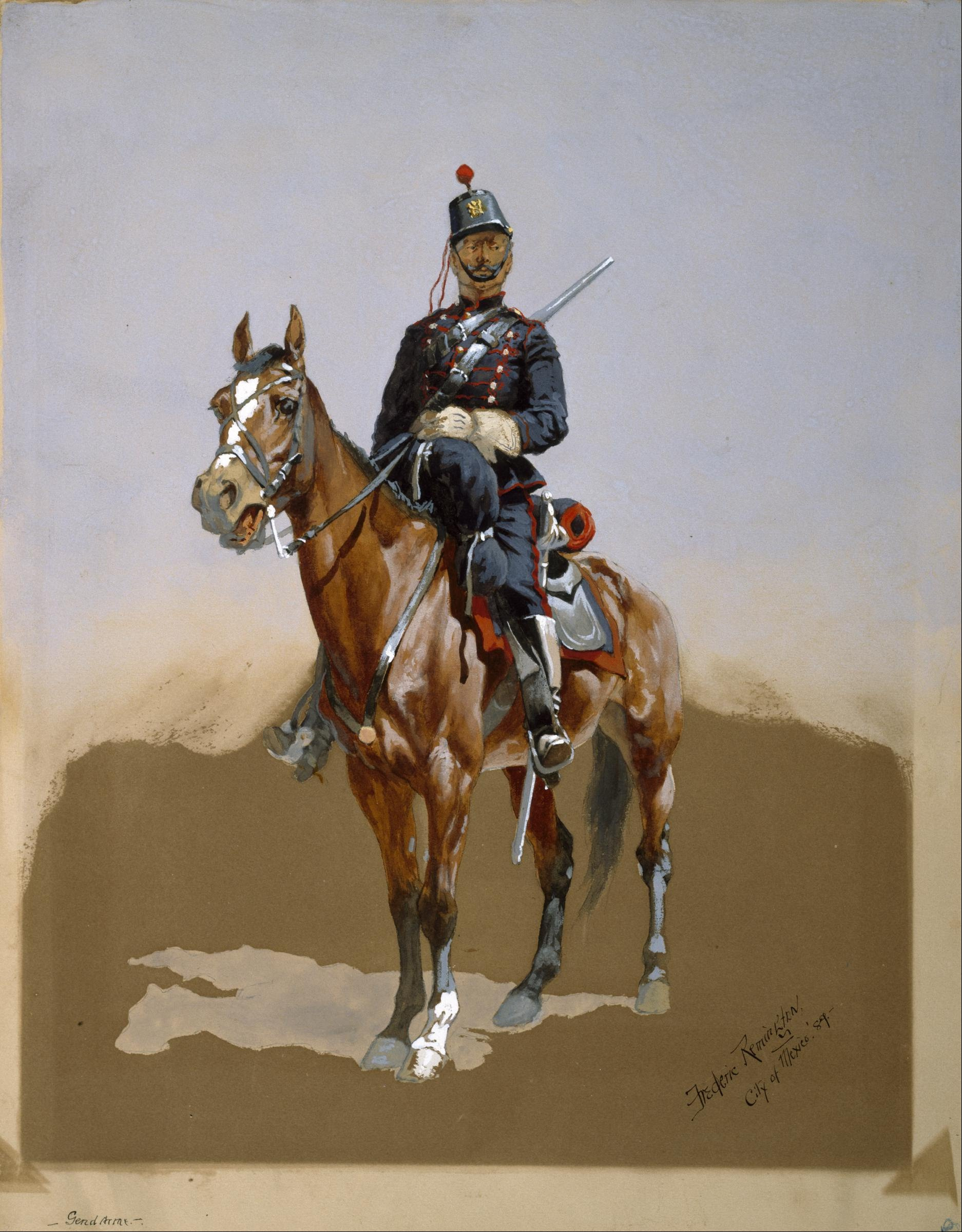
The Gendarme (1889)

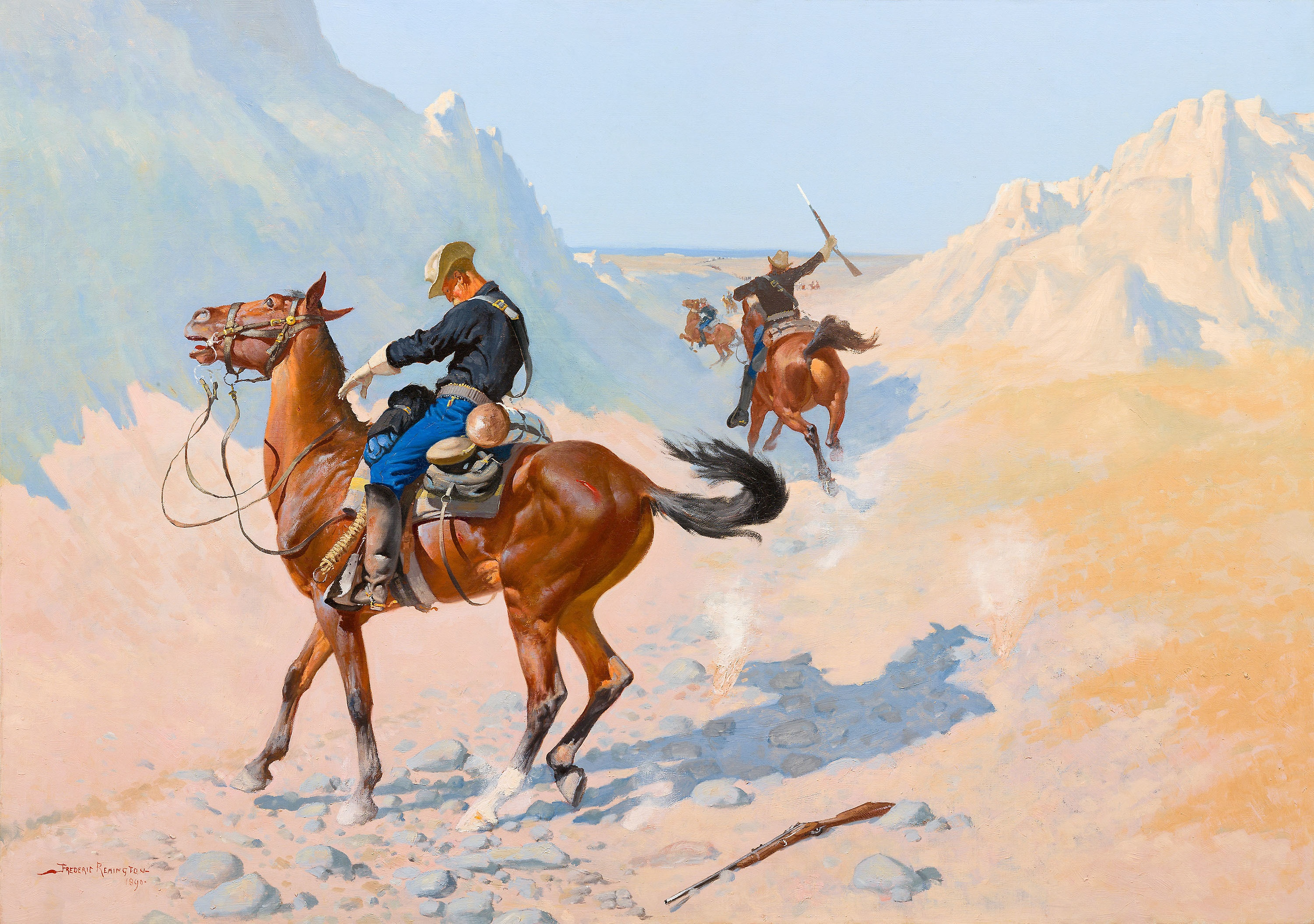
The Advance-Guard, or The Military Sacrifice (1890)

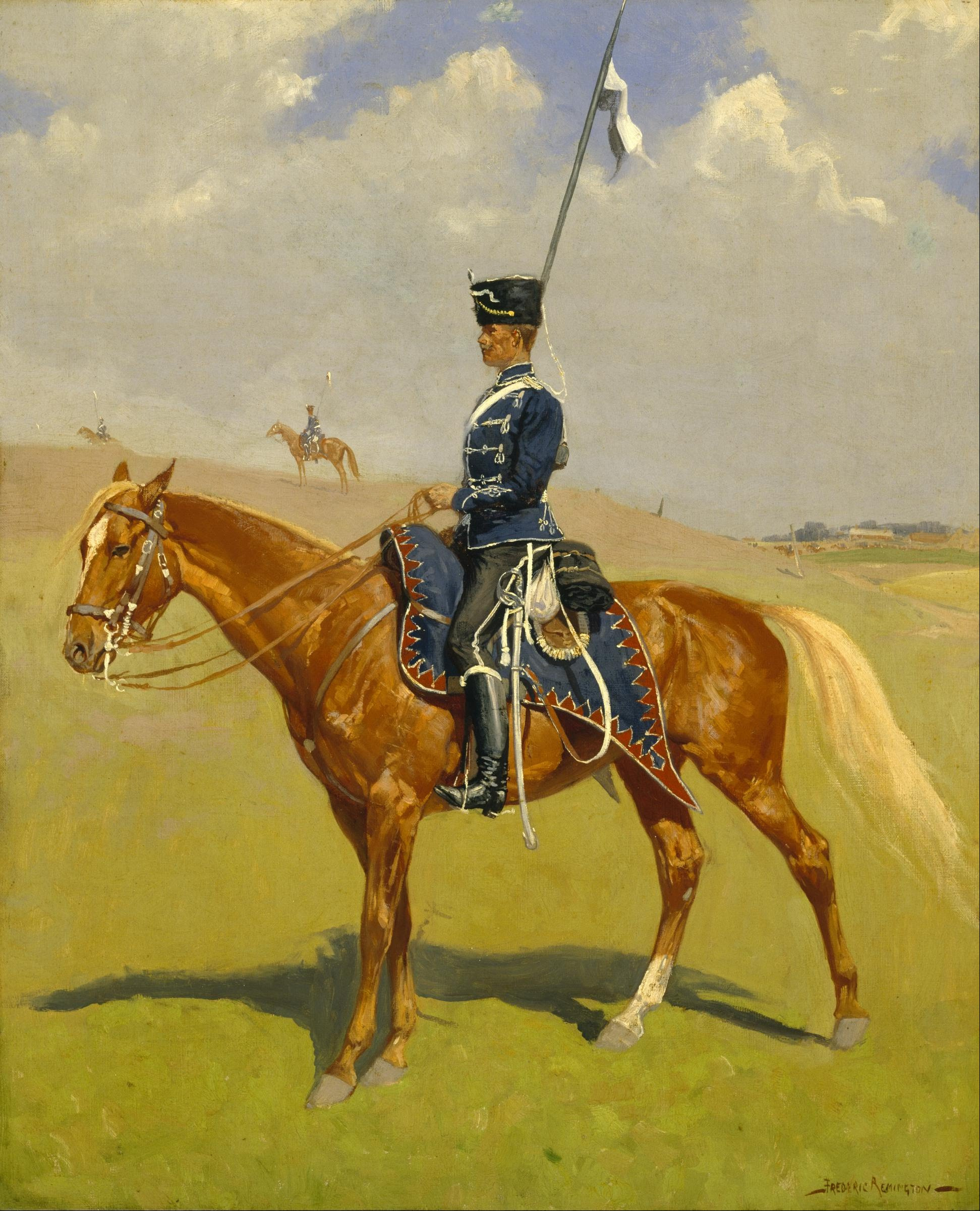
The Hussar (1893)

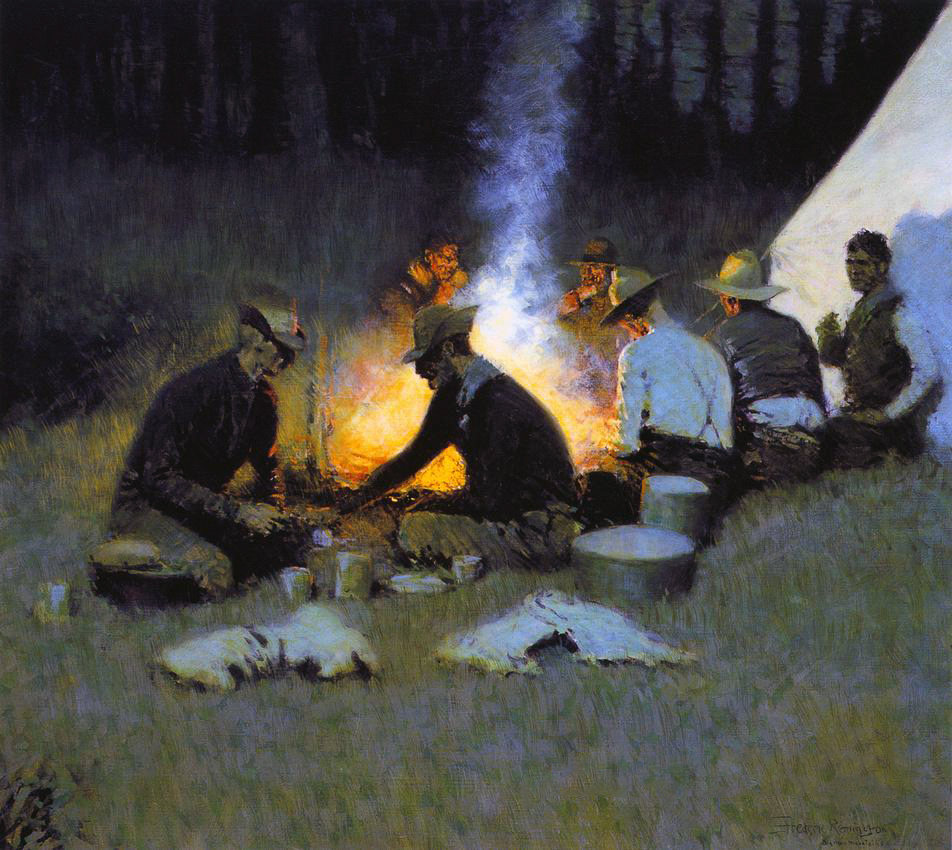
The Hunters' Supper

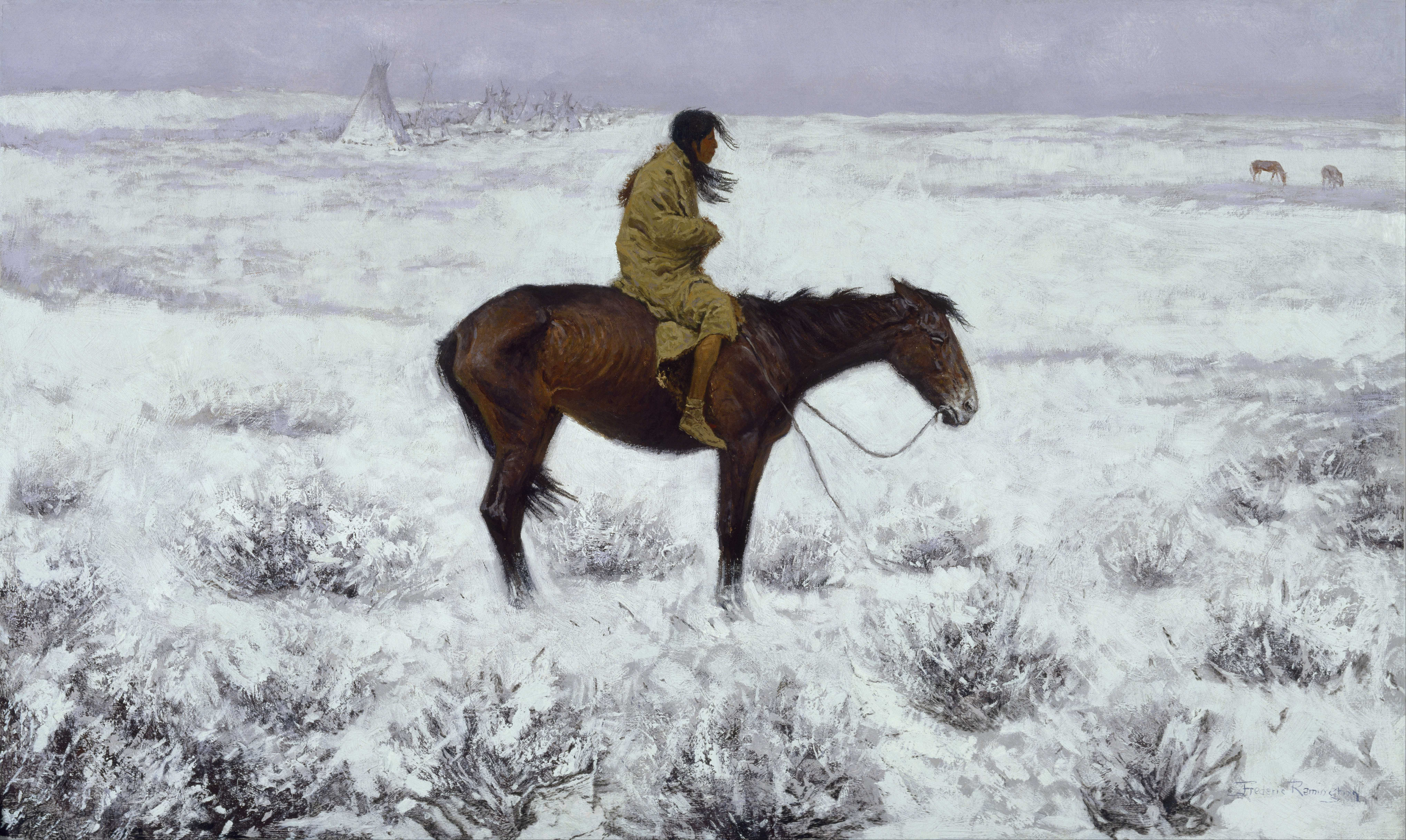
The Herd Boy

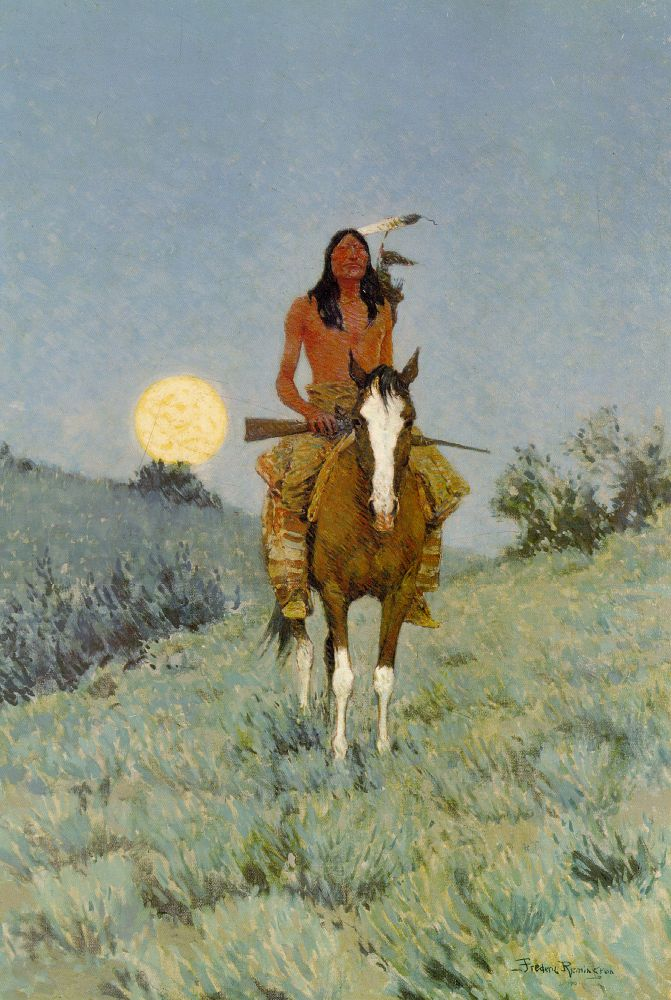
The Outlier

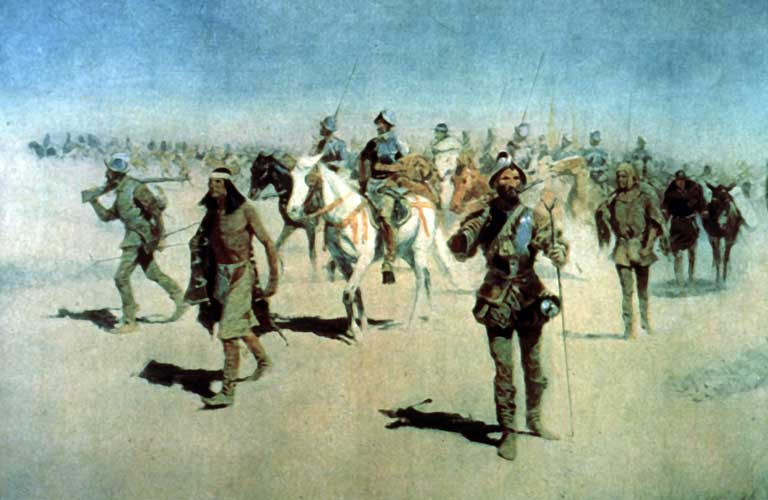
Coronado Sets Out to the North

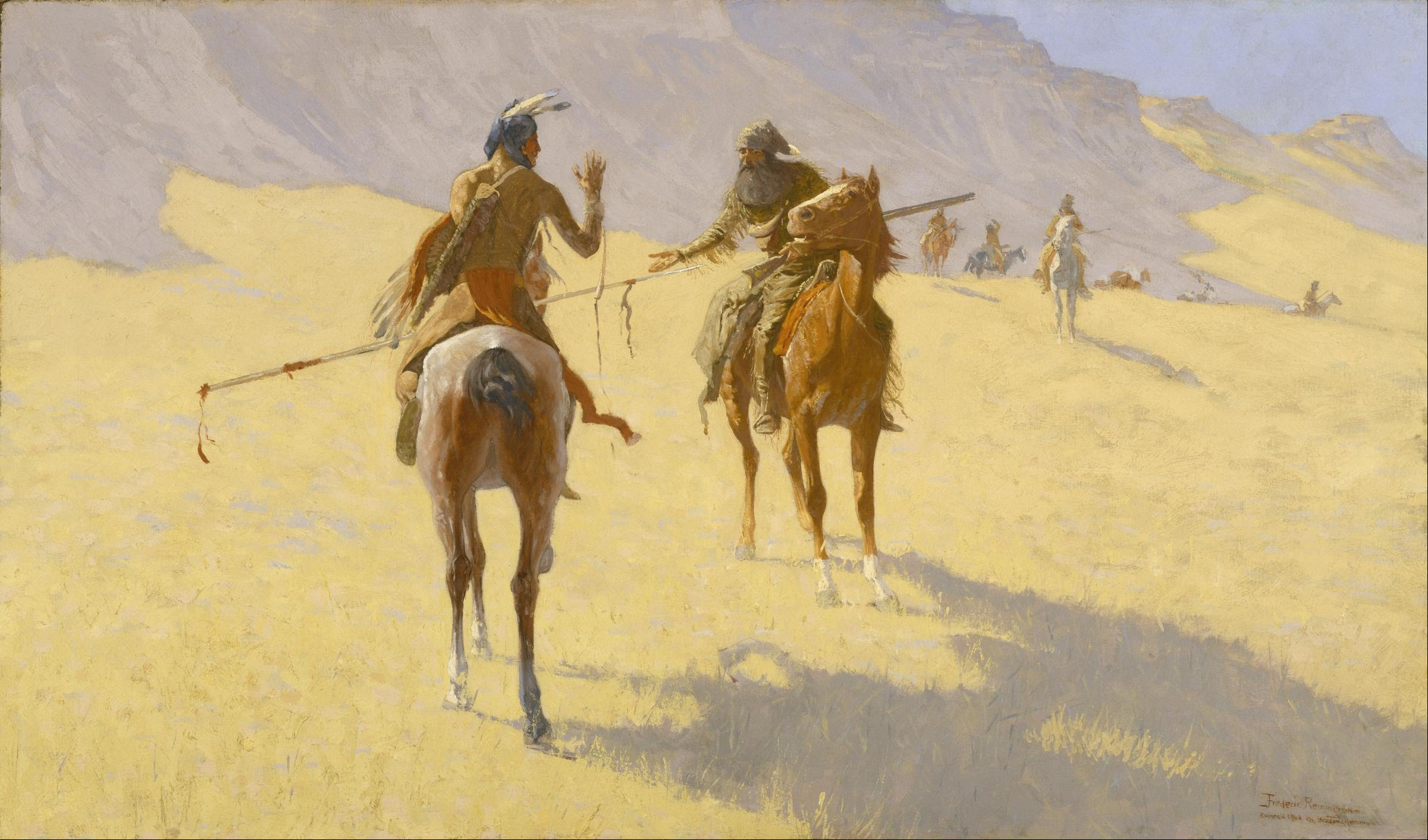
The Parley

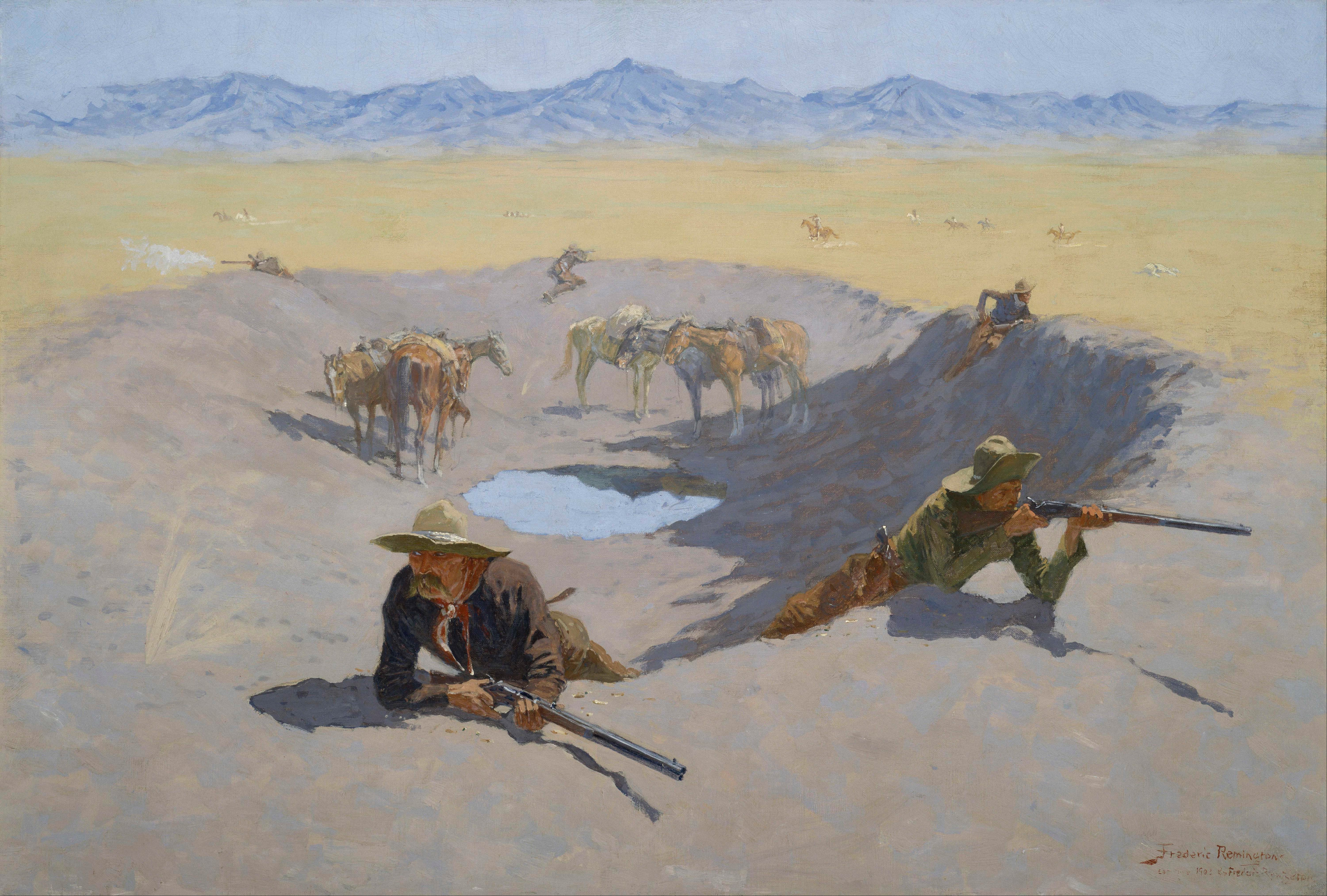
Fight for the Waterhole

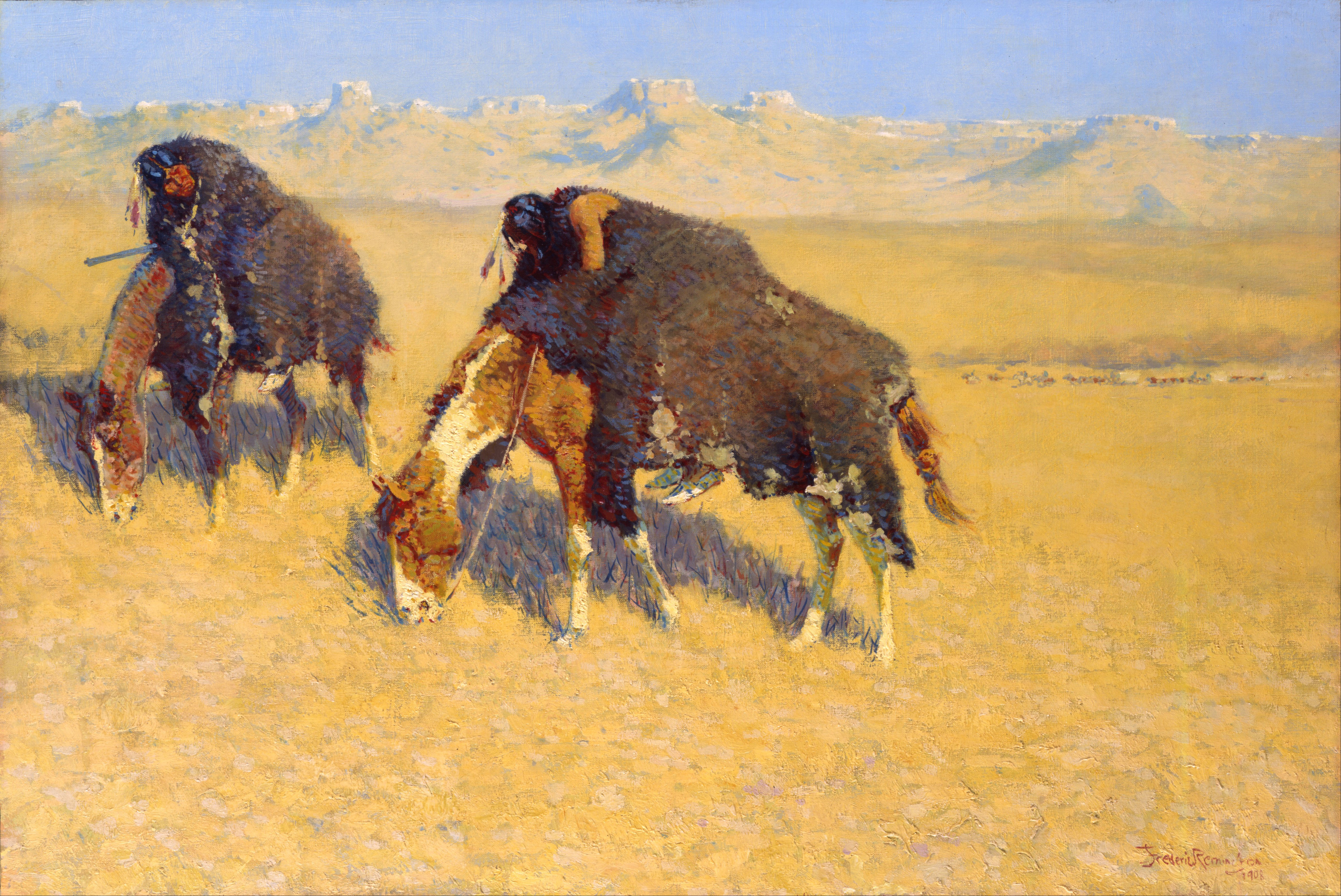
Indians Simulating Buffalo

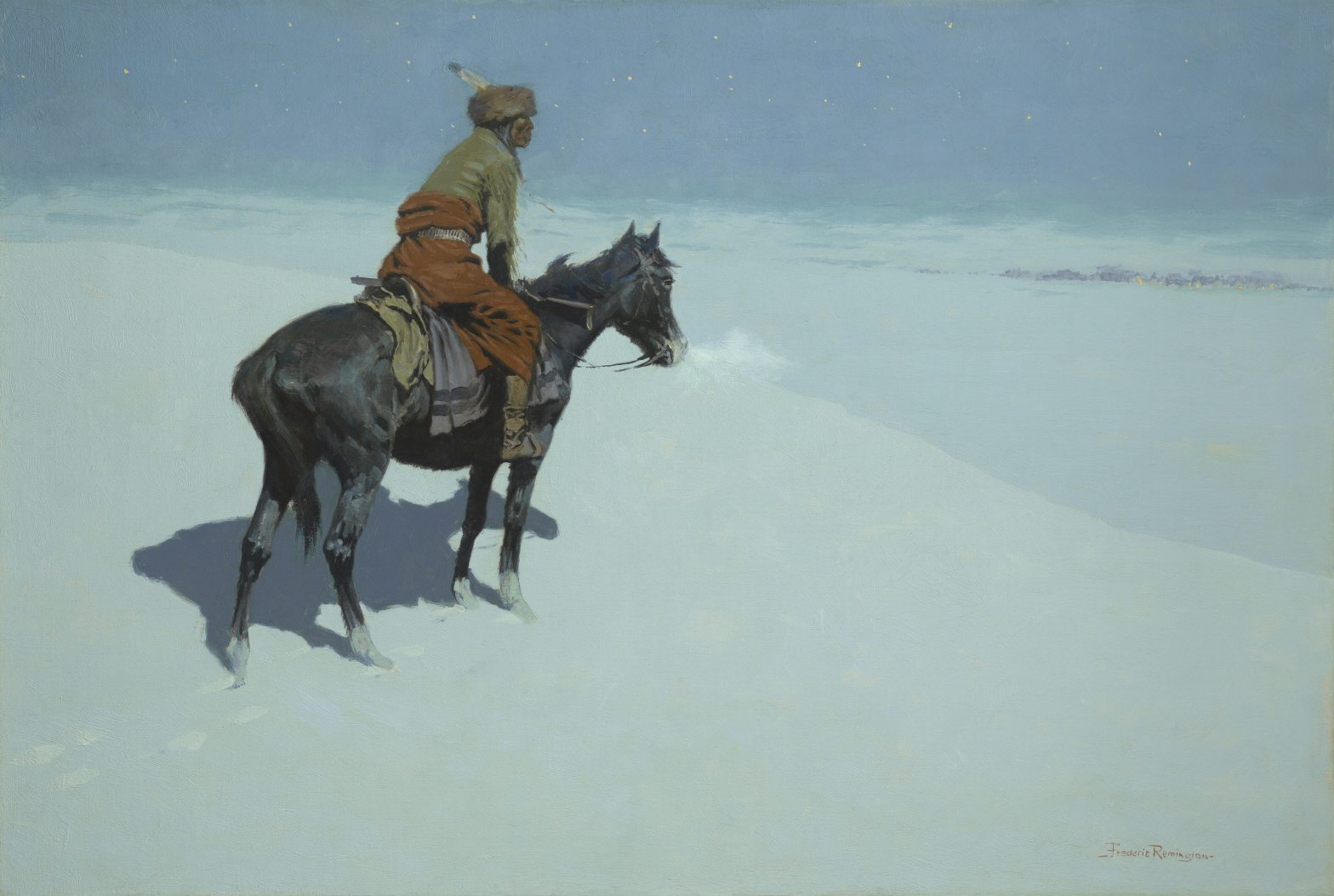
The Scout: Friends or Foes?, 1902–1905, oil on canvas, Sterling and Francine Clark Art Institute, Williamstown, Massachusetts

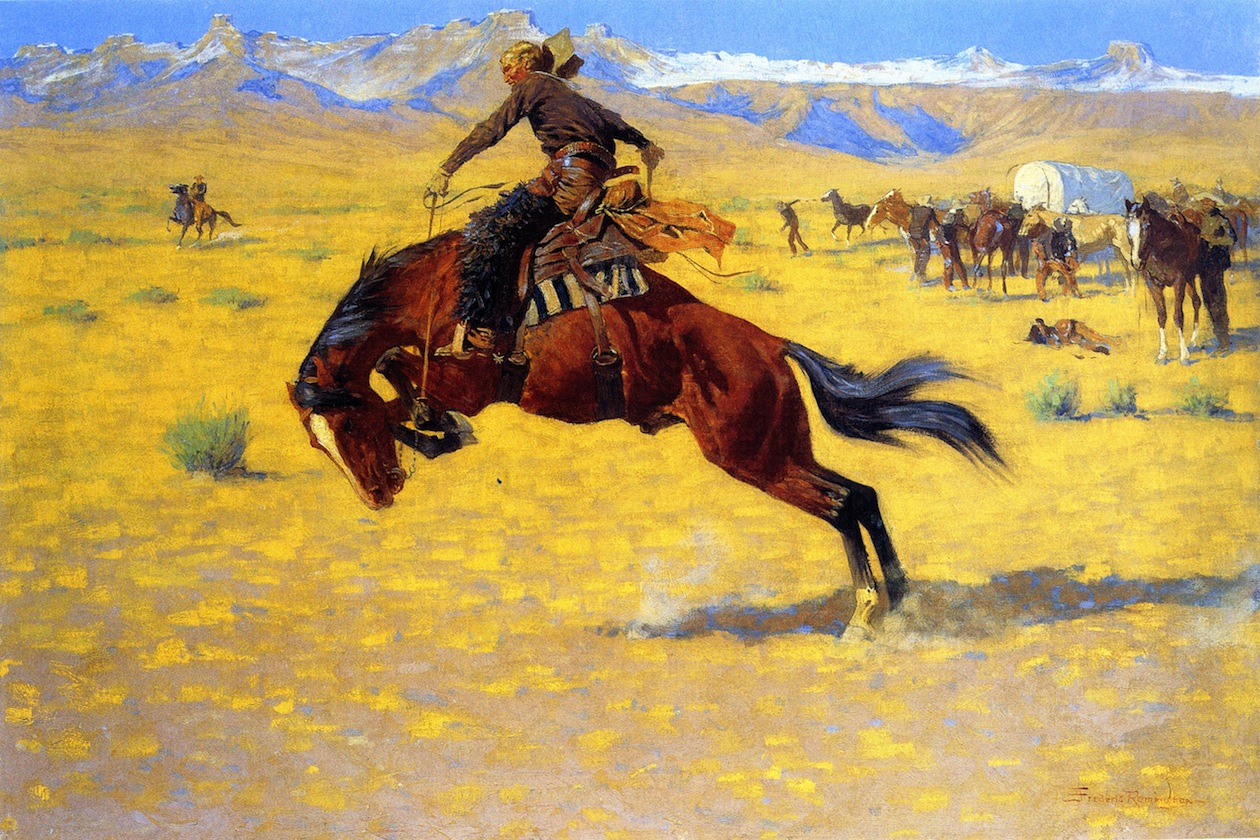
A Cold Morning on the Range, c. 1904, Oil on canvas, American Museum of Western Art, Denver, Colorado

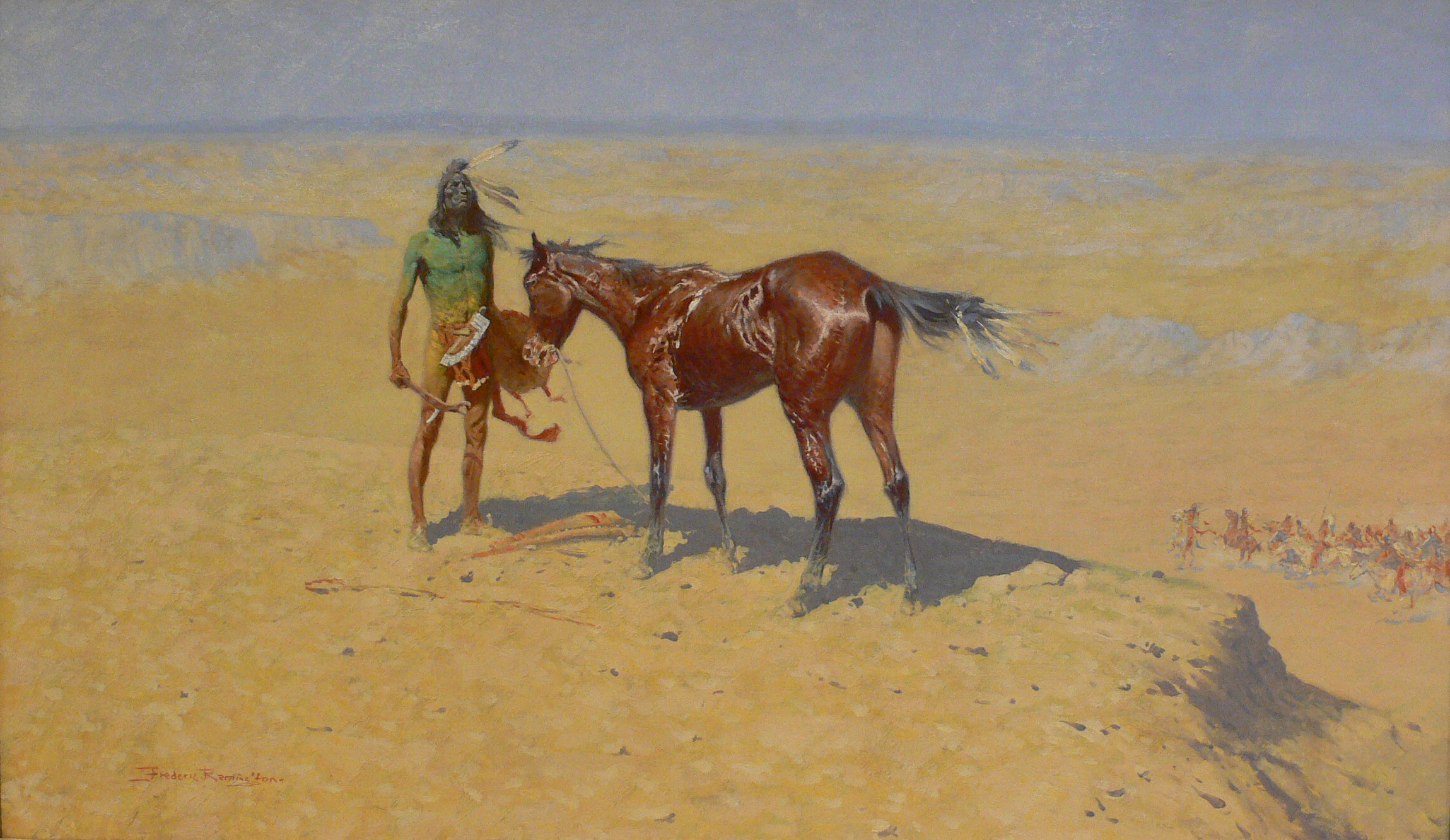
Ridden Down (1905–1906) depicts an Indian in defeat with his horse exhausted, stoically calling the spirits while awaiting his fate

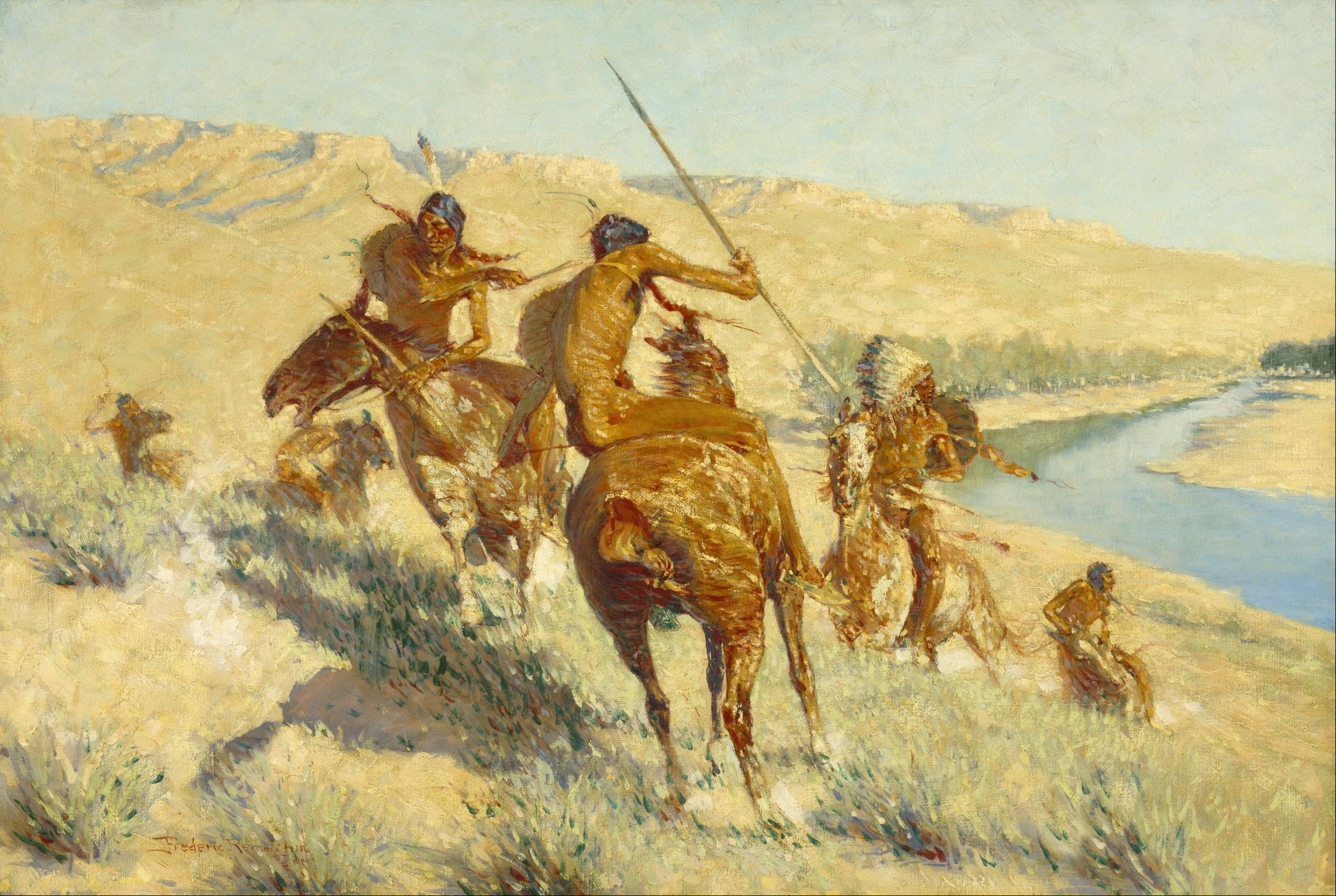
Episode of the Buffalo Gun

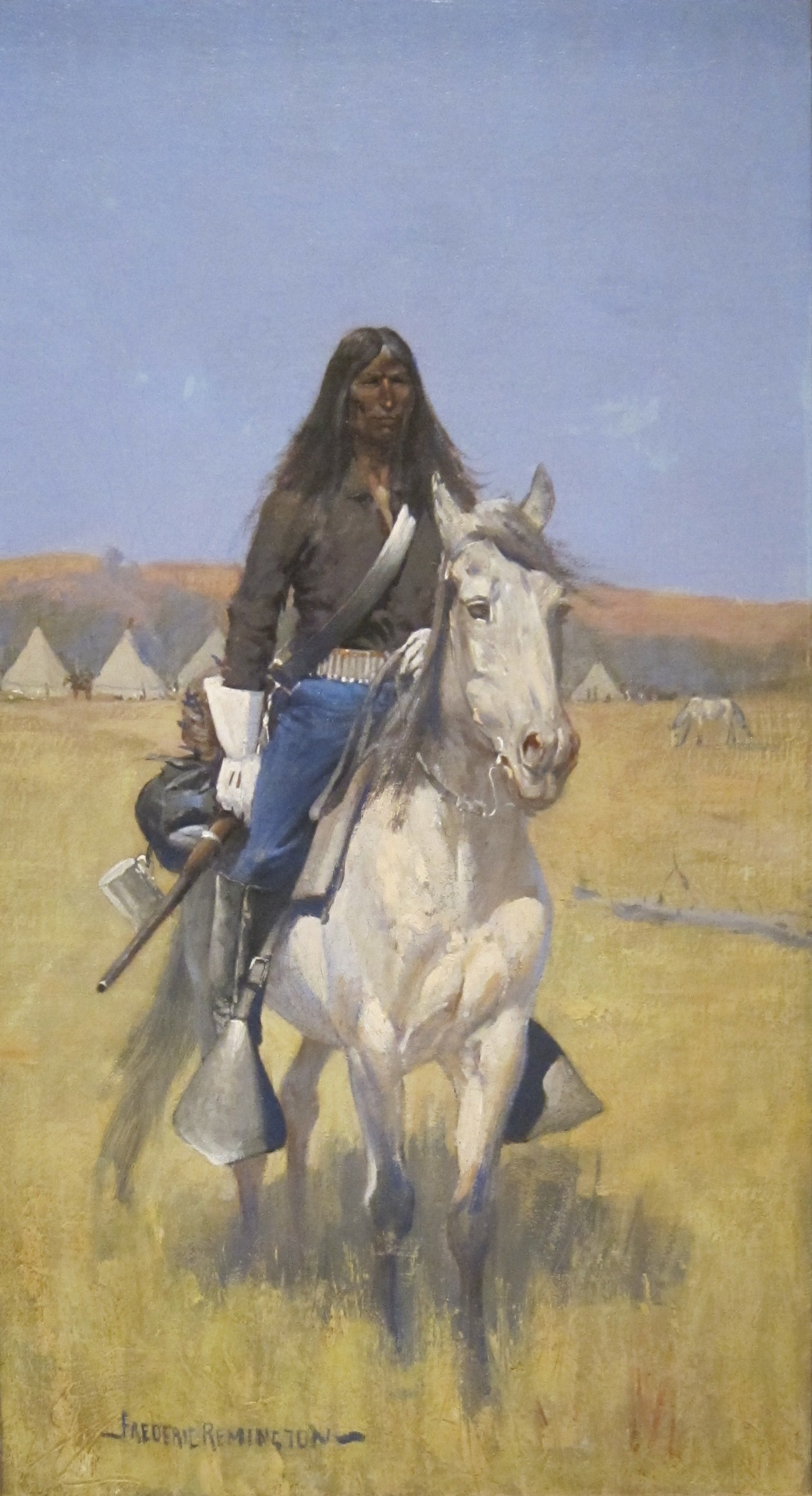
Mounted Indian Scout

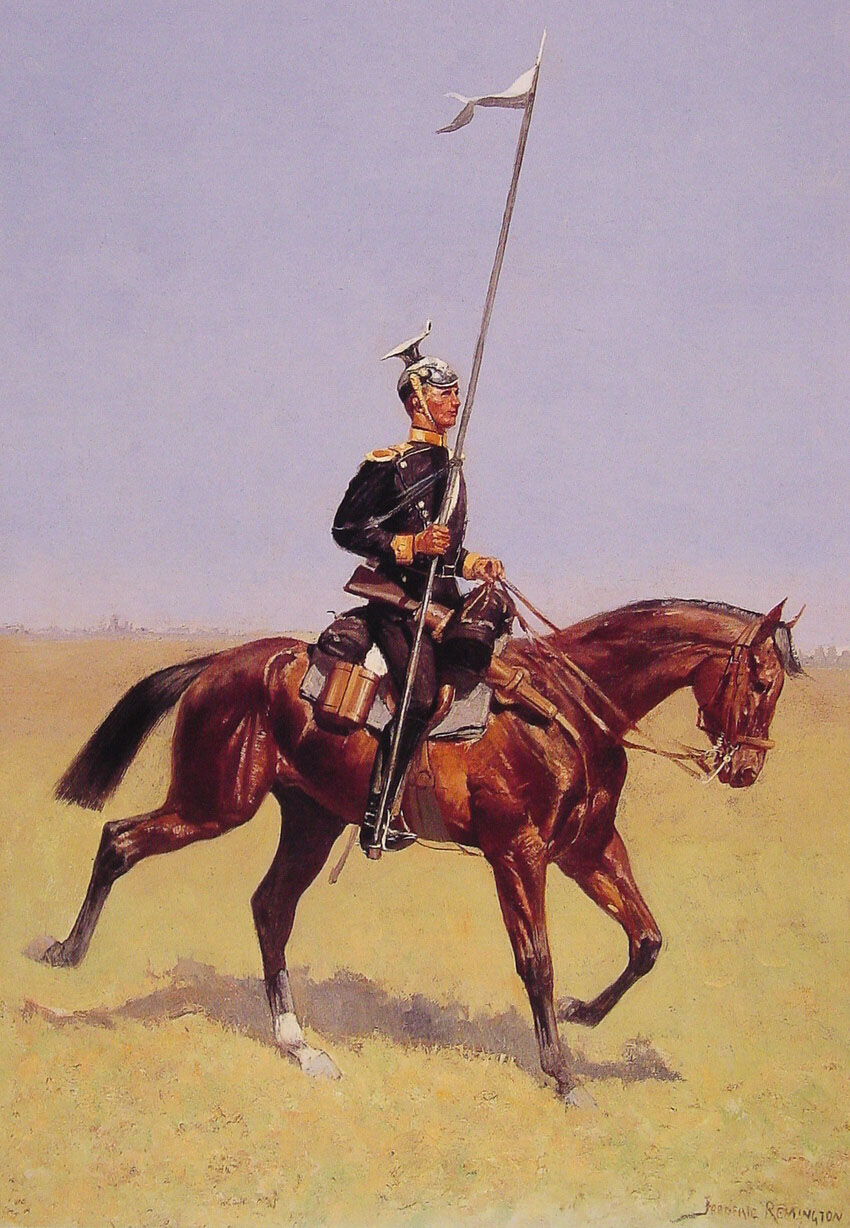
Uhlan

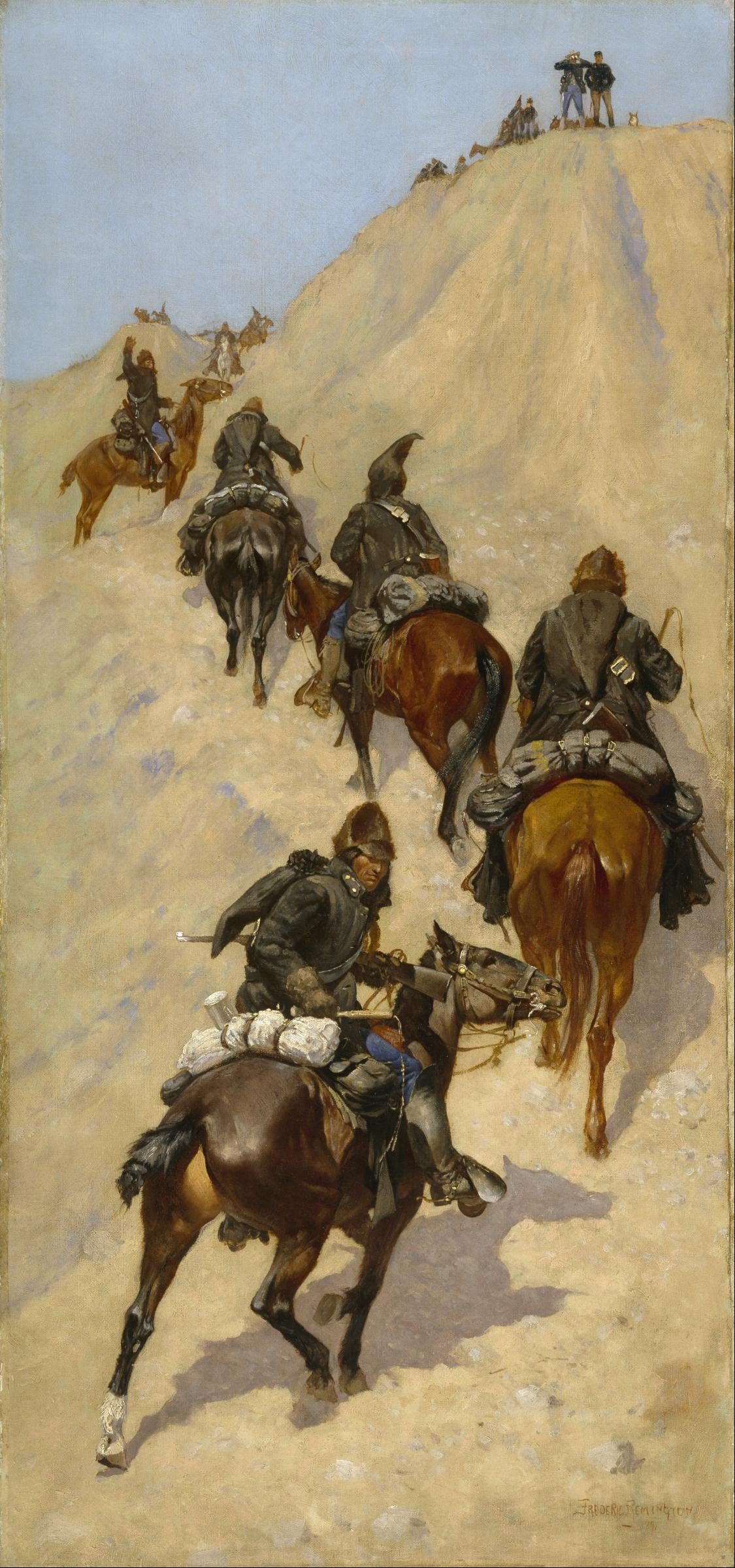
Scouts Climbing a Mountain

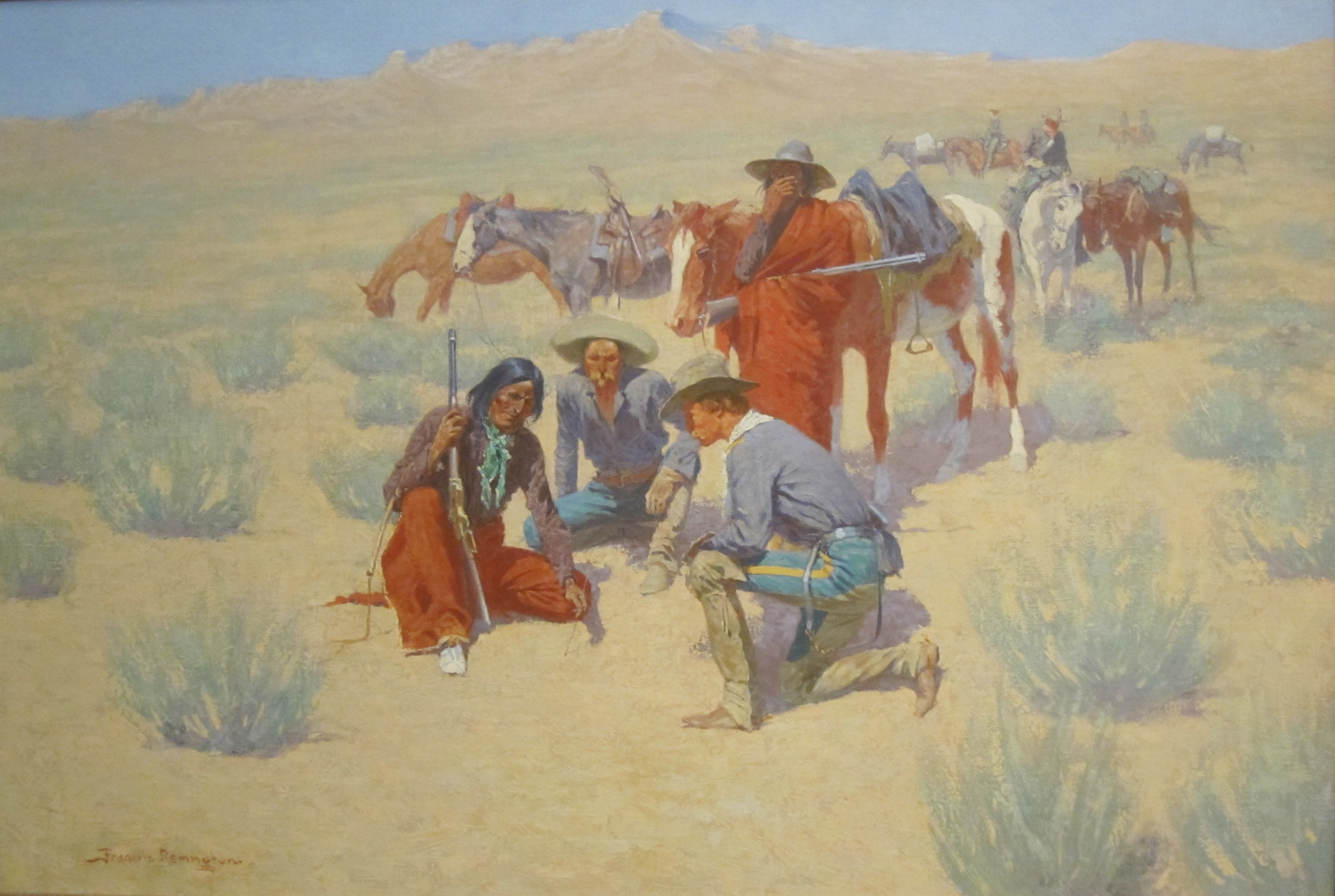
A Map in the Sand

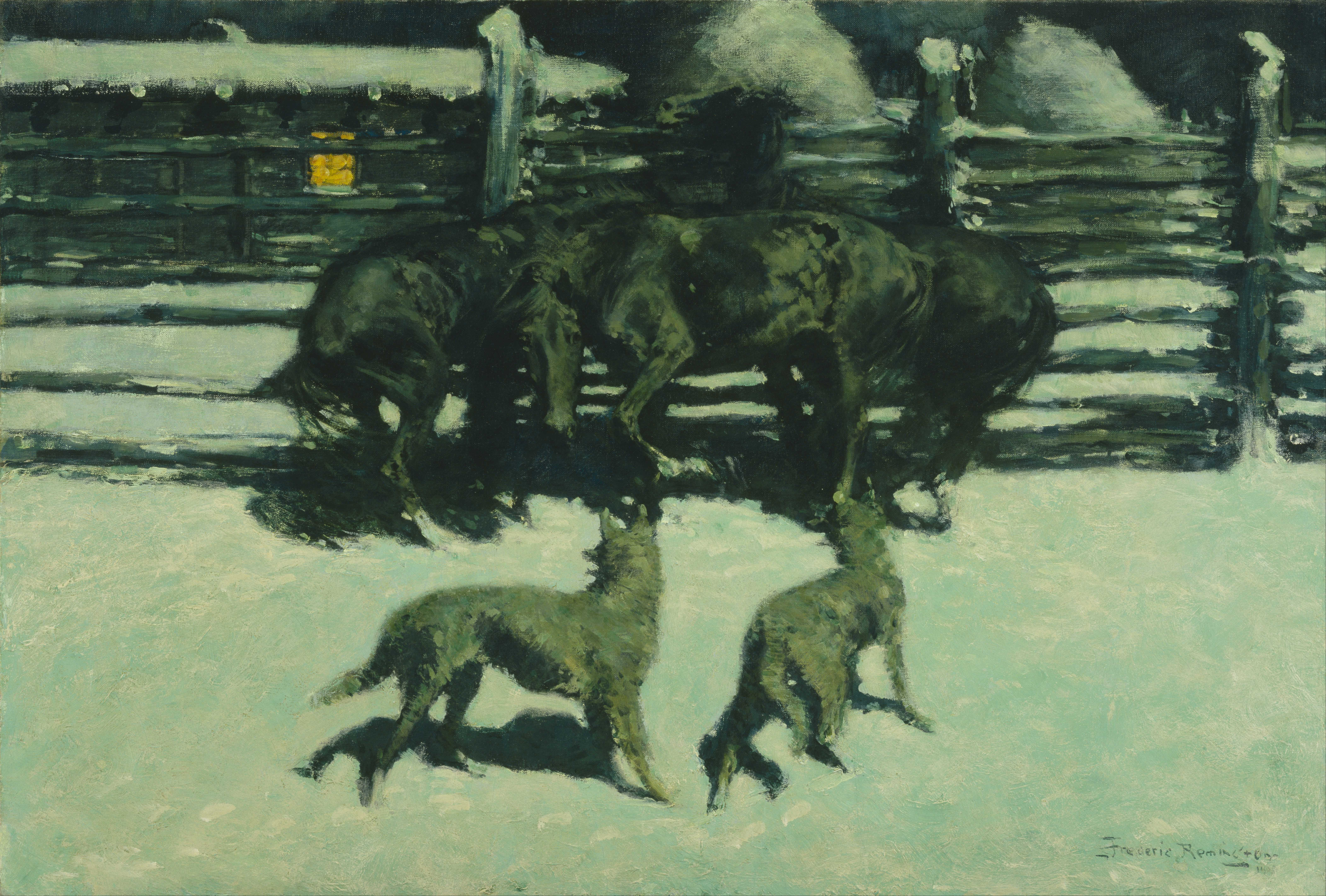
The Call for Help

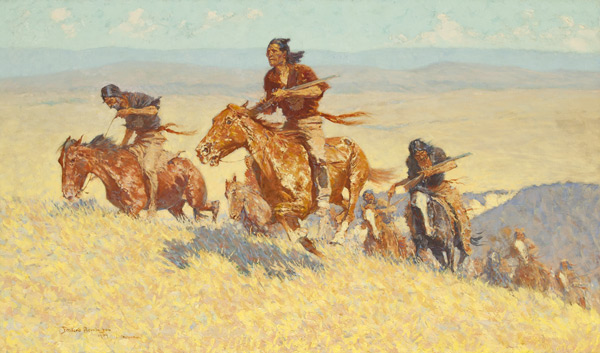
Buffalo Runners-Big Horn Basin, 1909, Oil on canvas, Sid Richardson Museum, Fort Worth, Texas (https://www.sidrichardsonmuseum.org)

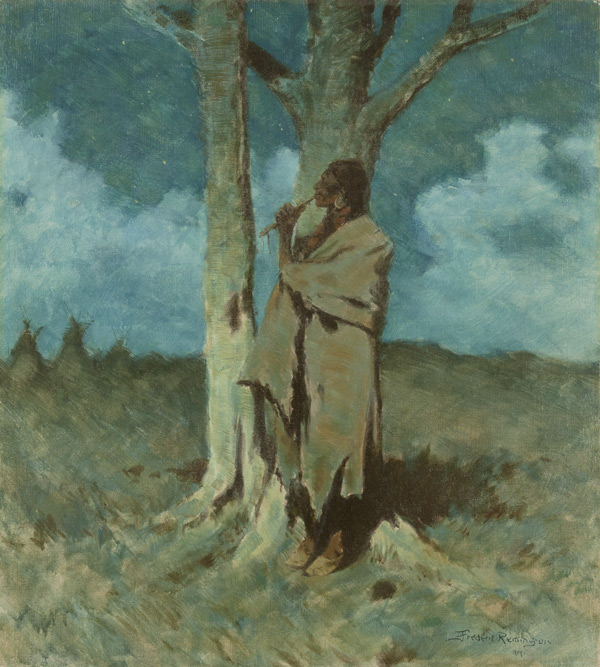
The Love Call, 1909, Oil on canvas, Sid Richardson Museum

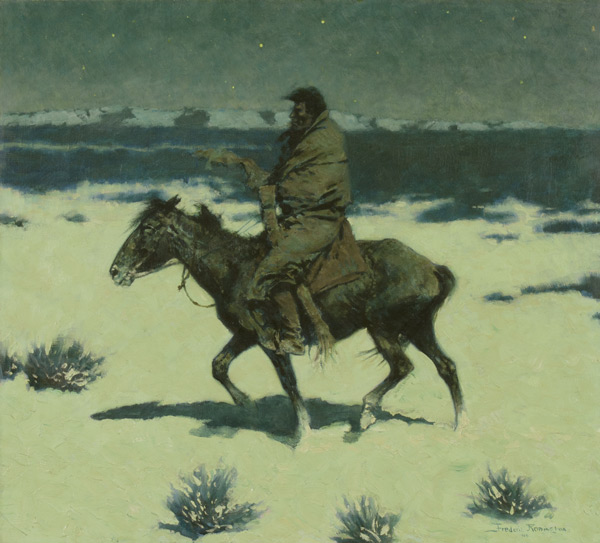
The Luckless Hunter, 1909, Oil on canvas, Sid Richardson Museum

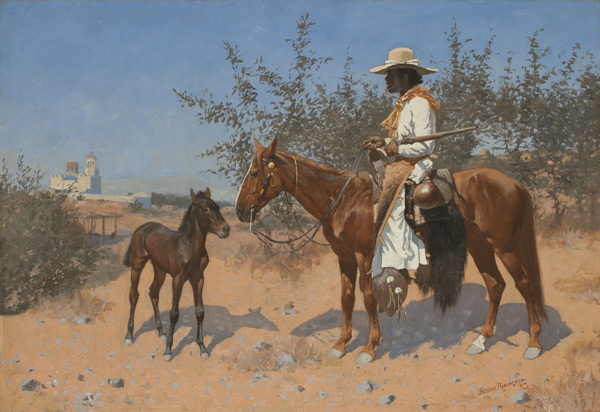
The Sentinel, 1889, Oil on canvas, Sid Richardson Museum

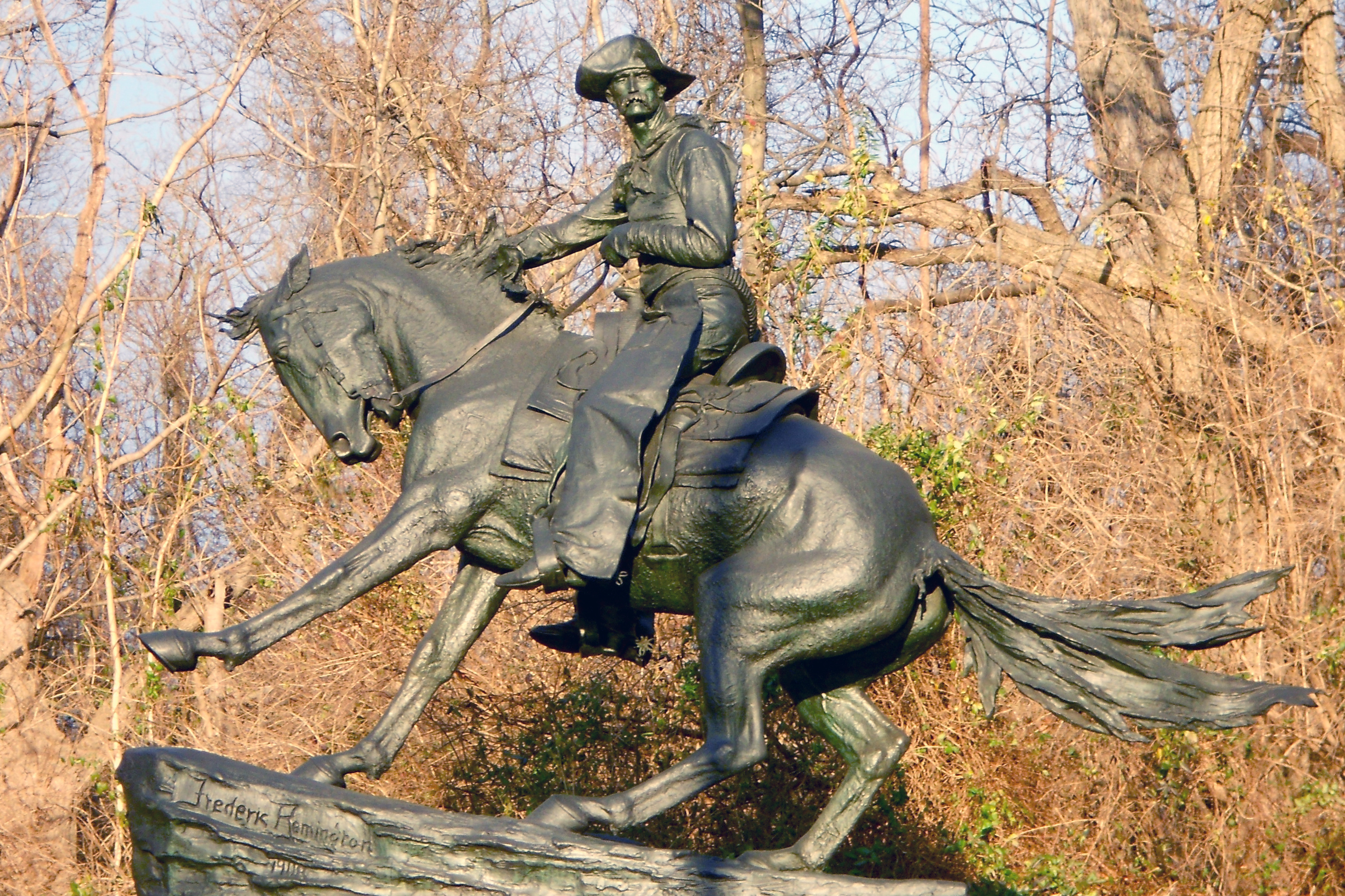
Cowboy, 1908, in Fairmount Park, Philadelphia, Pennsylvania

=== The Song of Hiawatha illustrations ===
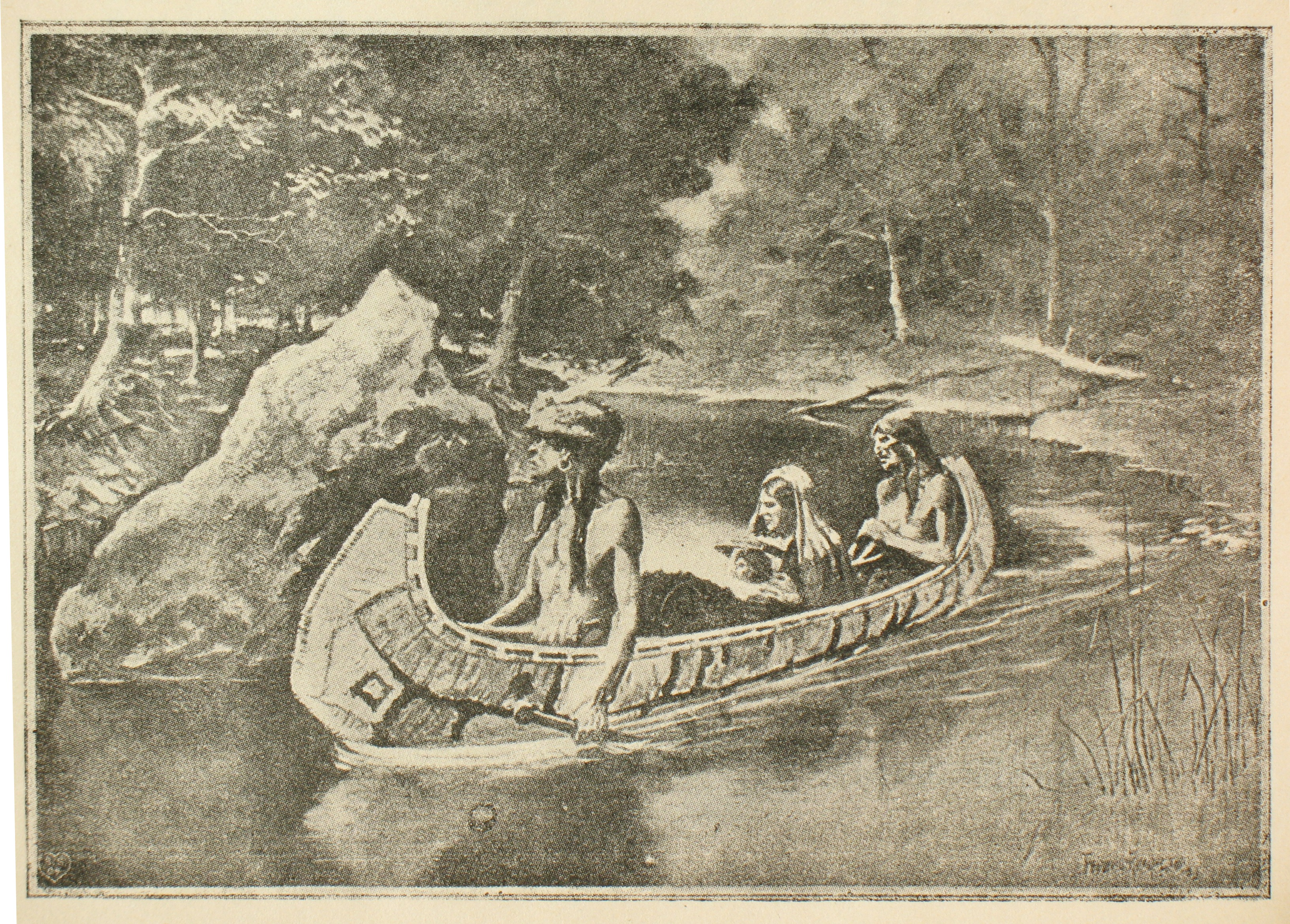

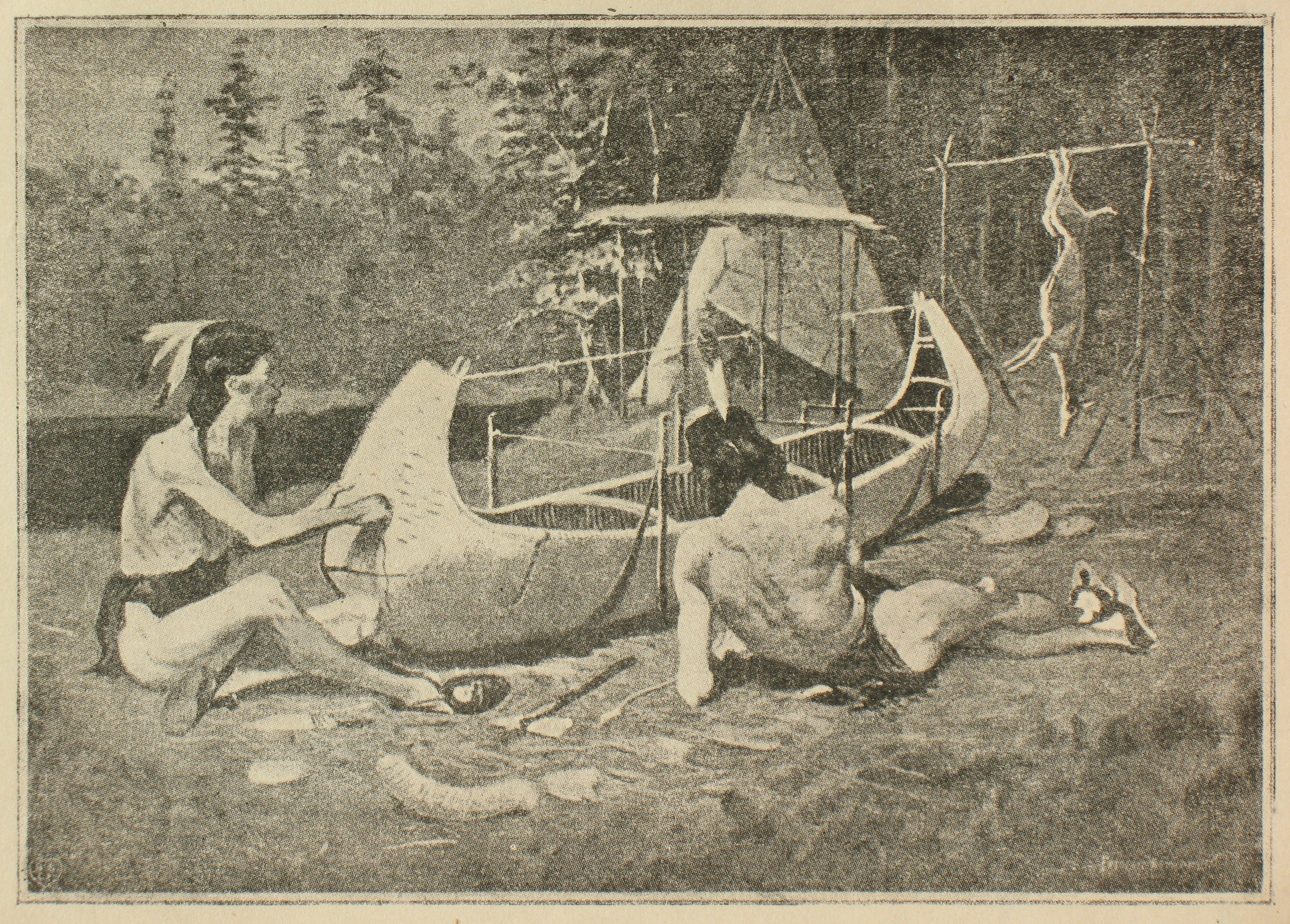

== Collections ==
American museums with significant collections of his paintings, illustrations, and sculptures include:

- Frederic Remington Art Museum, Ogdensburg, New York;
- Amon Carter Museum of American Art, Fort Worth, Texas
- Sid Richardson Museum, Fort Worth, Texas
- Buffalo Bill Center of the West, Cody, Wyoming
- Gilcrease Museum, Tulsa, Oklahoma
- Metropolitan Museum, New York City
- Museum of Fine Arts, Houston
- National Cowboy & Western Heritage Museum, Oklahoma City, Oklahoma, and others

=== In the Utah Museum of Fine Arts (UMFA) ===
- Bronco Buster (1895) – Bronze Figurine
- The Sergeant (1904) – Bronze Bust
- Navajo Shepherd and Goats – Paper Engraving/Illustration
- The Mountain Man (1903) – Bronze/Marble Figurine
- Rattle Snake (surmoulage) – Bronze/Marble Figurine

== Legacy ==
- Frederic Remington Art Museum in Ogdensburg, New York
- Frederic Remington High School in Whitewater, Kansas
- Frederic Remington House in Ridgefield, Connecticut, a National Historic Landmark
- Frederic Remington Post Office Building in Ogdensburg, New York
- Liberty Ship named Frederic Remington and used in World War II
- New Rochelle Walk of Fame, inductee
- Texas Trail of Fame, inductee
- Stockmen's Memorial, 1980
- R. W. Norton Art Gallery, Shreveport, Louisiana, museum has paintings and sculptures by Remington
- Remington Arts Festival, Canton, New York, held the first weekend in October
- Society of Illustrators Hall of Fame, inductee 1978
- Hall of Great Westerners of the National Cowboy & Western Heritage Museum inductee 1978
- Mentioned in poem "Legacy of a Rodeo Man" composed and performed by cowboy poet Baxter Black
- Mentioned in the lyrics of "The Last Cowboy Song" by The Highwaymen. 'Remington showed us how he looked on canvas, and Louis L'Amour has told us his tale'

== See also ==
- Cold Morning on the Range, a Remington painting
- Frederic Remington: The Truth of Other Days, 1991 American Masters documentary
- Earl W. Bascom, cowboy sculptor and cousin to Remington
- J. K. Ralston, western artist
- Charles M. Russell, western artist

== Sources ==
- Allen, Douglas, Frederic Remington and the Spanish–American War, New York : Crown, 1971.
- Buscombe, Edward. "Painting the Legend: Frederic Remington and the Western." Cinema Journal (1984) 23#4: 12–27.
- Dippie, Brian W. Remington & Russell, University of Texas, Austin, 1994, ISBN 0-292-71569-2.
- Dippie, Brian W. The Frederic Remington Art Museum Collection, Frederic Remington Art Museum, Ogdensburg, NY, 2001, ISBN 0-8109-6711-1.
- Greenbaum, Michael D. Icons of the West: Frederic Remington's Sculpture, Frederic Remington Art Museum, Ogdensburg, NY, 1996, ISBN 0-9651050-0-8.
- Logan, Linda. "The geographical imagination of Frederic Remington: the invention of the cowboy West." Journal of Historical Geography 18.1 (1992): 75–90.
- McCullough, David. Brave Companions: Portraits in History, Chapter 5, "Remington", New York: Simon & Schuster, 1992, ISBN 0-671-79276-8.
- Samuels, Peggy & Harold. Frederic Remington: A Biography, Doubleday & Co., Garden City, NY, 1982, ISBN 0-385-14738-4.
- Vorpahl, Ben Merchant. Frederic Remington and the West: With the Eye of the Mind (U of Texas Press, 2014).
- Vorpahl, Ben Merchant, ed. My dear Wister: The Frederic Remington–Owen Wister Letters (Palo Alto, Calif.: American West, 1972).
- White, G. Edward. The Eastern Establishment and the Western Experience: The West of Frederic Remington, Theodore Roosevelt, and Owen Wister (U of Texas Press, 2012).
