= National Register of Historic Places listings in St. Lawrence County, New York =

Location of St. Lawrence County in New York

List of the National Register of Historic Places listings in St. Lawrence County, New York

This is intended to be a complete list of historic properties and districts listed on the National Register of Historic Places in St. Lawrence County, New York. The locations of National Register properties and districts (at least for all showing latitude and longitude coordinates below) may be seen in a map by clicking on "Map of all coordinates". One of the sites is further designated a U.S. National Historic Landmark.

This National Park Service list is complete through NPS recent listings posted April 24, 2026.

Contents: Counties in New York
Albany (Albany) – Allegany – Bronx – Broome – Cattaraugus – Cayuga – Chautauqua – Chemung – Chenango – Clinton – Columbia – Cortland – Delaware – Dutchess (Poughkeepsie, Rhinebeck) – Erie (Buffalo) – Essex – Franklin – Fulton – Genesee – Greene – Hamilton – Herkimer – Jefferson – Kings – Lewis – Livingston – Madison – Monroe (Rochester) – Montgomery – Nassau – New York (Below 14th Street, 14th to 59th Streets, 59th to 110th Streets, Above 110th Street, Islands) – Niagara (Niagara Falls) – Oneida – Onondaga (Syracuse) – Ontario – Orange – Orleans – Oswego – Otsego – Putnam – Queens – Rensselaer – Richmond – Rockland – St. Lawrence – Saratoga – Schenectady – Schoharie – Schuyler – Seneca – Steuben – Suffolk – Sullivan – Tioga – Tompkins – Ulster – Warren – Washington – Wayne – Westchester (Northern, Southern, New Rochelle, Peekskill, Yonkers) – Wyoming – Yates

== Listings county-wide ==
| | Name on the Register | Image | Date listed | Location | City or town | Description |
|---|---|---|---|---|---|---|
| 1 | Acker and Evans Law Office | Acker and Evans Law Office | September 15, 1983 (#83001792) | 315 State St. 44°41′49″N 75°29′33″W | Ogdensburg | |
| 2 | Adirondack Forest Preserve | Adirondack Forest Preserve | October 15, 1966 (#66000891) | Northeast New York State; 43°58′43″N 74°18′42″W | St. Lawrence County | 623,000 acres (2,520 km^{2}) of the 6-million-acre (24,000 km^{2}) park are in St. Lawrence County |
| 3 | Arab Mountain Fire Observation Station | Arab Mountain Fire Observation Station | September 23, 2001 (#01001039) | Arab Mountain; 44°12′47″N 74°35′48″W | Piercefield | |
| 4 | Benjamin Gordon Baldwin House | Benjamin Gordon Baldwin House | September 15, 2004 (#04000994) | 26 Baldwin Ave. 44°45′14″N 74°59′26″W | Norwood | |
| 5 | Bayside Cemetery and Gatehouse Complex | Bayside Cemetery and Gatehouse Complex | March 26, 2004 (#03000026) | 115 Clarkson Ave. 44°39′17″N 74°59′29″W | Potsdam | |
| 6 | Brick Chapel Church and Cemetery | | December 22, 2005 (#05001461) | 5501 Cty Rte 27; 44°33′36″N 75°06′58″W | Canton | |
| 7 | Luke Brown House | | June 6, 2003 (#03000030) | 831 NY 72; 44°37′45″N 74°54′08″W | Parishville | |
| 8 | Buck's Bridge United Methodist Church | Buck's Bridge United Methodist Church | September 15, 2004 (#04000985) | 2927 Cty Rte 14; 44°42′09″N 75°09′39″W | Buck's Bridge | |
| 9 | Chase Mills Inn | | November 29, 1978 (#78003122) | Mein and Townline Rds. 44°50′56″N 75°04′52″W | Chase Mills | |
| 10 | Childwold Memorial Presbyterian Church | Childwold Memorial Presbyterian Church | May 30, 2001 (#01000585) | Bancroft Rd. 44°17′05″N 74°40′09″W | Piercefield | |
| 11 | Clare Town Hall | | December 6, 2004 (#04001343) | 3441 CR 27; 44°26′06″N 75°03′21″W | Clare | |
| 12 | Clarkson Office Building | Clarkson Office Building | March 5, 2004 (#03000031) | 17 Maple St. 44°40′04″N 74°59′20″W | Potsdam | |
| 13 | Clarkson-Knowles Cottage | Clarkson-Knowles Cottage | December 7, 1995 (#95001405) | 37 Main St. 44°40′06″N 74°59′00″W | Potsdam | |
| 14 | Congregational Church | Congregational Church | December 8, 2005 (#05001387) | 218 Rensselaer St. 44°35′33″N 75°19′07″W | Rensselaer Falls | |
| 15 | Gardner Cox House | | March 20, 1986 (#86000484) | Main St. 44°36′43″N 74°58′23″W | Hannawa Falls | |
| 16 | Crossover Island Light Station | Crossover Island Light Station | October 3, 2007 (#07001037) | Crossover Island; 44°29′56″N 75°46′42″W | St. Lawrence River | |
| 17 | Dr. Buck-Stevens House | Dr. Buck-Stevens House | May 17, 1982 (#82004745) | W. Main St. 44°48′27″N 74°46′32″W | Brasher Falls | |
| 18 | Edwards Town Hall | | July 28, 2004 (#04000752) | 161 Main St. 44°19′29″N 75°15′07″W | Edwards | |
| 19 | Fine Town Hall | | August 1, 1996 (#96000829) | 91 NY 58; 44°14′51″N 75°08′21″W | Fine | |
| 20 | Judge John Fine House | | January 9, 1986 (#86000012) | 422 State St. 44°41′46″N 75°29′29″W | Ogdensburg | |
| 21 | First Baptist Church of Ogdensburg Complex | | May 18, 2018 (#SG100002466) | 617 State St. 44°41′37″N 75°29′24″W | Ogdensburg | Stone church built over 50 years in the 19th century is home to city's oldest congregation; also houses exemplary 1930s stained glass by Harry James Horwood. |
| 22 | First Congregational Church of Madrid | | November 10, 2010 (#10000914) | 6 Cross St.; 32 Main St. 44°45′02″N 75°07′53″W | Madrid | |
| 23 | First Presbyterian Church Complex | First Presbyterian Church Complex | September 17, 2015 (#15000607) | 22 Church St. 44°20′05″N 75°28′14″W | Gouverneur | 1893 Romanesque Revival church made of locally quarried marble |
| 24 | First Presbyterian Church of Dailey Ridge | | April 1, 2002 (#02000300) | 411 Elliot Rd. 44°44′48″N 75°03′48″W | Potsdam | |
| 25 | Jacob Ford House | Jacob Ford House | September 2, 1982 (#82004684) | Northumberland St. 44°35′09″N 75°39′09″W | Morristown | |
| 26 | Fort La Presentation Site | Fort La Presentation Site | November 26, 2010 (#10000944) | Lighthouse Point; 44°41′44″N 75°30′03″W | Ogdensburg | |
| 27 | French Family Farm | | November 4, 1982 (#82001269) | Southwest of Potsdam on US 11; 44°38′18″N 75°04′18″W | Potsdam | |
| 28 | Hale Cemetery | Hale Cemetery | August 9, 2024 (#100010607) | 3366 County Route 47; 44°46′56″N 74°57′29″W | Norfolk | |
| 29 | Halfway House | | July 31, 2023 (#100009167) | 4365 NY 68; 44°39′33″N 75°19′47″W | Lisbon | |
| 30 | Harrison Grist Mill | | September 16, 1982 (#82004683) | NY 345; 44°39′50″N 75°11′47″W | Morley | |
| 31 | Hepburn Library | Hepburn Library | September 24, 2004 (#04001056) | 1 Hepburn St. 44°48′09″N 74°59′29″W | Norfolk | |
| 32 | Hepburn Library of Colton | Hepburn Library of Colton | May 16, 2012 (#12000287) | 84 Main St. 44°33′11″N 74°56′20″W | Colton | |
| 33 | Hepburn Library of Lisbon | | August 22, 2016 (#16000556) | 6899 Lisbon Center State Rd. 44°43′30″N 75°19′15″W | Lisbon | One of seven Hepburn libraries built across the county from 1917 to 1920 by local philanthropist they are named for |
| 34 | Herring-Cole Hall, St. Lawrence University | Herring-Cole Hall, St. Lawrence University | May 1, 1974 (#74002203) | St. Lawrence University campus 44°35′32″N 75°09′51″W | Canton | |
| 35 | Hopkinton Green Historic District | Hopkinton Green Historic District | September 10, 2014 (#14000583) | NY 11B, Co. Rd. 49 & Church St; 44°41′26″N 74°42′15″W | Hopkinton | Core of small town that grew up around 1803 mill |
| 36 | Knollwood | | January 4, 2012 (#11001006) | South end of Inlet Rd. at Oswegatchie River; 44°07′28″N 74°57′32″W | Star Lake | |
| 37 | Land Office | Land Office | September 2, 1982 (#82004685) | Main St. 44°35′20″N 75°39′02″W | Morristown | |
| 38 | Library Park Historic District | Library Park Historic District | November 4, 1982 (#82001270) | 303-323 Washington St., 100-112 Carolina St., and Liberty Park; 44°41′58″N 75°29′37″W | Ogdensburg | |
| 39 | Lisbon Railroad Depot | | November 22, 2000 (#00001422) | 6936 Cty Rd. 10; 44°43′39″N 75°19′09″W | Lisbon | |
| 40 | Lisbon Town Hall | | September 4, 1980 (#80004336) | Church and Main Sts. 44°43′44″N 75°19′16″W | Lisbon | |
| 41 | Market Street Historic District | Market Street Historic District | November 16, 1979 (#79003171) | Market and Raymond Sts. 44°40′13″N 74°59′12″W | Potsdam | |
| 42 | Methodist Episcopal Church of East DeKalb | | December 24, 1998 (#98001550) | 696 E. De Kalb Rd. 44°28′59″N 75°18′04″W | De Kalb | |
| 43 | Paschal Miller House | Paschal Miller House | September 2, 1982 (#82004686) | Main and Gouveneur Sts. 44°35′16″N 75°38′57″W | Morristown | |
| 44 | Morristown Schoolhouse | Morristown Schoolhouse | September 2, 1982 (#82004687) | Columbia St. 44°35′06″N 75°38′47″W | Morristown | |
| 45 | New York Central Railroad Adirondack Division Historic District | New York Central Railroad Adirondack Division Historic District | December 23, 1993 (#93001451) | NYCRR Right-of-Way; 44°08′05″N 74°37′50″W | Horseshoe | The New York Central passed through Horseshoe, Mt. Arab Station, and Childwold Station. A 1908 bunkhouse in Horseshoe is extant. |
| 46 | New York State Armory | | December 12, 1976 (#76002174) | 100 Lafayette St. 44°41′26″N 75°29′36″W | Ogdensburg | try also New York State Armory |
| 47 | Ogdensburg Armory | Ogdensburg Armory | March 2, 1995 (#95000088) | 225 Elizabeth St. 44°41′57″N 75°29′23″W | Ogdensburg | |
| 48 | Ogdensburg Harbor Lighthouse | Ogdensburg Harbor Lighthouse | April 26, 2016 (#16000202) | 2 Jackson St. 44°41′52″N 75°30′12″W | Ogdensburg | 1871 lighthouse at Oswegatchie River confluence with St. Lawrence was key to establishing safe commerce on river. |
| 49 | Oswegatchie Pumping Station | | June 11, 1990 (#90000816) | Mechanic St. north of Lafayette St. 44°41′29″N 75°29′32″W | Ogdensburg | |
| 50 | Nathaniel Parmeter House | Nathaniel Parmeter House | June 6, 2003 (#03000027) | 498 NY 59; 44°38′33″N 74°59′13″W | Potsdam | |
| 51 | Pickens Hall | | October 27, 2004 (#04001205) | 83 State St. 44°37′10″N 75°24′22″W | Heuvelton | |
| 52 | Pierrepont Town Buildings | Pierrepont Town Buildings | November 4, 1982 (#82001271) | Main St. 44°32′30″N 75°00′39″W | Pierrepont Center | |
| 53 | Potsdam Civic Center Complex | Potsdam Civic Center Complex | May 3, 2016 (#16000226) | 2 Park St; 44°40′10″N 74°58′58″W | Potsdam | Mid-1930s complex built as New Deal relief project of locally quarried stone incorporates 1870s church |
| 54 | Potsdam State Normal School Campus | Potsdam State Normal School Campus | February 23, 2015 (#15000032) | 41 Elm & 56-60 Main Sts. 44°40′07″N 74°58′56″W | Potsdam | One of the two buildings used by Clarkson University; built around 1917 as sixth such school in state |
| 55 | Raymondville Parabolic Bridge | Raymondville Parabolic Bridge | September 7, 1984 (#84002961) | Grant Rd. over Raquette River; 44°50′23″N 74°58′47″W | Raymondville | |
| 56 | Richardson Hall, St. Lawrence University | Richardson Hall, St. Lawrence University | May 1, 1974 (#74002204) | St. Lawrence University campus 44°35′31″N 75°09′48″W | Canton | |
| 57 | Robinson Bay Archeological District | Robinson Bay Archeological District | September 13, 1977 (#77001524) | Address Restricted | Massena | |
| 58 | Russell Town Hall | | January 4, 1996 (#95001492) | Jct. of Main and Mill Sts., NW corner 44°25′46″N 75°09′02″W | Russell | |
| 59 | St. Lawrence County Government Complex | St. Lawrence County Government Complex | May 10, 2024 (#100010267) | 48 Court Street; 44°35′57″N 75°10′11″W | Canton | |
| 60 | St. Lawrence University-Old Campus Historic District | St. Lawrence University-Old Campus Historic District | September 15, 1983 (#83001793) | Park St. 44°35′26″N 75°09′50″W | Canton | |
| 61 | Samuel Stocking House | | September 2, 1982 (#82004688) | 83 Gouverneur St. 44°35′18″N 75°38′53″W | Morristown | |
| 62 | Sunday Rock | Sunday Rock | December 7, 2010 (#10000990) | NY 56; 44°30′35″N 74°53′39″W | South Colton | |
| 63 | Stone Windmill | Stone Windmill | September 2, 1982 (#82004689) | Morris St. 44°35′24″N 75°38′50″W | Morristown | |
| 64 | Trinity Episcopal Chapel | Trinity Episcopal Chapel | February 19, 1990 (#90000003) | Rt. 65, south of Morley; 44°39′44″N 75°12′03″W | Morley | |
| 65 | Trinity Episcopal Church | Trinity Episcopal Church | February 13, 2003 (#03000032) | 38 Maple St. 44°40′02″N 74°59′18″W | Potsdam | |
| 66 | U.S. Customshouse | U.S. Customshouse | October 9, 1974 (#74002205) | 127 N. Water St. 44°41′50″N 75°29′52″W | Ogdensburg | |
| 67 | U.S. Post Office-Ogdensburg | | August 16, 1977 (#77001525) | 431 State St. 44°36′52″N 75°29′28″W | Ogdensburg | |
| 68 | United Methodist Church | United Methodist Church | September 2, 1982 (#82004690) | Gouveneur St. 44°35′10″N 75°38′46″W | Morristown | |
| 69 | United Presbyterian Church | | October 5, 2005 (#05001124) | 26 Church St. 44°43′47″N 75°19′17″W | Lisbon | |
| 70 | US Post Office-Canton | US Post Office-Canton | November 17, 1988 (#88002469) | 100 Main St. 44°35′43″N 75°10′09″W | Canton | |
| 71 | US Post Office-Gouverneur | US Post Office-Gouverneur | May 11, 1989 (#88002516) | 35 Grove St. 44°20′06″N 75°27′58″W | Gouverneur | |
| 72 | US Post Office-Potsdam | US Post Office-Potsdam | May 11, 1989 (#88002410) | 21 Elm St. 44°40′10″N 74°59′05″W | Potsdam | |
| 73 | Village Park Historic District | Village Park Historic District | May 6, 1975 (#75002087) | Both sides of Main and Park Sts., and Park Pl. 44°35′43″N 75°10′06″W | Canton | |
| 74 | Waddington Historic District | Waddington Historic District | May 18, 1992 (#92000457) | Jct. of NY 37 and La Grasse St. 44°51′49″N 75°12′13″W | Waddington | |
| 75 | Jonathan Wallace House | Jonathan Wallace House | June 6, 2003 (#03000028) | 99 Market St. 44°40′19″N 74°59′15″W | Potsdam | |
| 76 | Wanakena Presbyterian Church | Wanakena Presbyterian Church | September 28, 2007 (#07001015) | 32 Second St. 44°08′09″N 74°55′18″W | Wanakena | Called the Western Adirondack Presbyterian Church |
| 77 | Watkins-Sisson House | Watkins-Sisson House | September 9, 2013 (#13000697) | 14 Leroy Street; 44°40′18″N 74°59′01″W | Potsdam | Mid-1860s brick house given Classical Revival expansion in early 20th century |
| 78 | West Stockholm Historic District | West Stockholm Historic District | November 20, 1979 (#79003172) | W. Stockholm and Livingston Rds. 44°42′44″N 74°54′08″W | West Stockholm | |
| 79 | Wright's Stone Store | Wright's Stone Store | September 2, 1982 (#82004691) | Main St. 44°35′20″N 75°39′04″W | Morristown | |
| 80 | Young Memorial Church | Young Memorial Church | May 18, 2011 (#11000293) | Junction of School St. and NY 37; 44°31′54″N 75°39′47″W | Brier Hill | |
| 81 | Zion Episcopal Church and Rectory | Zion Episcopal Church and Rectory | June 6, 2003 (#03000029) | 91 and 95 Main St. 44°33′13″N 74°56′22″W | Colton | |

== Former listing ==
| | Name on the Register | Image | Date listed | Date removed | Location | City or town | Description |
|---|---|---|---|---|---|---|---|
| 1 | Wanakena Footbridge | Wanakena Footbridge | August 19, 1999 (#99001001) | May 3, 2016 | Over Oswegatchie River, between Front St. and South Shore Rd. 44°07′59″N 74°55′18″W | Wanakena (Fine) | Bridge built to allow workers to reach lumber mills; was destroyed by ice in 2014 |
