= Knollwood =

Knollwood may refer to the following places in the U.S.:

- Knollwood, Los Angeles, California
- Knollwood, Illinois
- Knollwood (Worcester, Massachusetts), listed on the NRHP
- Knollwood (Dublin, New Hampshire), listed on the NRHP
- Knollwood Estate, Muttontown, New York
- Knollwood (Star Lake, New York), listed on the NRHP in St. Lawrence County
- Knollwood (Bearden Hill), Knoxville, Tennessee, listed on the NRHP
- Knollwood, Texas
- Knollwood Village, Houston, Texas

== See also ==
- Knollwood Club, an Adirondack Great Camp on Lower Saranac Lake in New York
