= Lisbon station =

Lisbon Station was a formation of the Royal Navy. It may also refer to:

- Lisbon Railroad Depot, a former railway station in Lisbon, New York, United States
- in Lisbon, Portugal:
  - Cais do Sodré railway station
  - Gare do Oriente
  - Rossio railway station
  - Santa Apolónia railway station
  - a Lisbon Metro station
