= New York State Armory =

New York State Armory may refer to:

- New York State Armory (Newburgh)
- New York State Armory (Ogdensburg)
- New York State Armory (Poughkeepsie)
- New York State Armory (Kingston), now the Andy Murphy Midtown Neighborhood Center
- New York State Armory (Ticonderoga)

== See also ==
- List of armories and arsenals in New York City and surrounding counties
- Category:Armories in New York City
