= Market Street Historic District =

Market Street Historic District can refer to:

- Market Street Historic District (Salem, New Jersey), listed on the NRHP
- Market Street Historic District (Corning, New York), NRHP
- Market Street Historic District (Palmyra, New York), NRHP
- Market Street Historic District (Potsdam, New York), NRHP
- Market Street Row, in Poughkeepsie, New York, NRHP
