= Ogdensburg and Lake Champlain Railroad =

Overview
- Locale: New York state
- Dates of operation: 1849–1901
- Successor: Rutland Railroad's Ogdensburg Division

Technical
- Track gauge: 4 ft 8 1/2 in (1,435 mm)
- Length: 211 miles (340 km)

The Ogdensburg and Lake Champlain Railroad was founded in 1849 as the Northern Railroad running from Ogdensburg to Rouses Point, New York. The 118-mile (190 km) railroad was leased by rival Central Vermont Railroad for several decades, ending in 1896. It was purchased in 1901 by the Rutland Railroad and became its Ogdensburg Division.

== History ==
=== Chartering and Construction ===
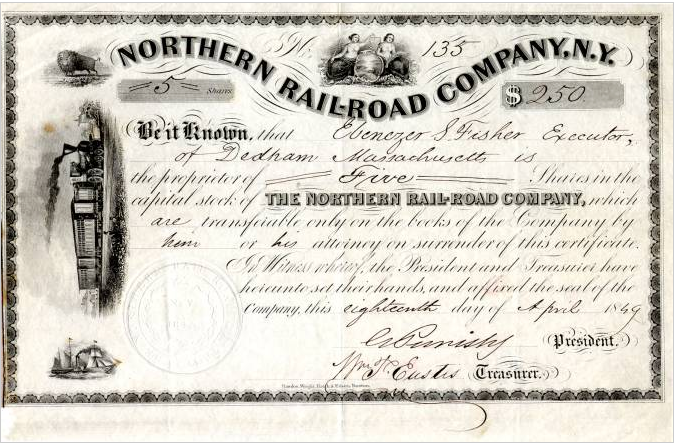
Stock certificate issued in 1849 near the founding of the Northern Railroad Company

The Northern Railroad was incorporated on May 14, 1845, for the purpose of connecting Ogdensburg on the St. Lawrence River to Rouses Point on Lake Champlain. An organizational meeting held in Ogdensburg in June, 1845 elected George Parish (later Baron von Senftenburg) as president, S. S. Walley as treasurer, James G. Hopkins as secretary, and Col. Charles L. Schiatter as chief engineer-superintendent. George Parish was allegedly upset that the route would not go through Parishville, named after his uncle David Parish, and resigned a few months that. He was replaced by Boston financier T.P. Chandler.

The railroad completed construction to Rouses Point on October 1, 1850. A connection was shortly after made to the Vermont and Canada Railroad in the State of Vermont when the railroads opened a floating bridge across Lake Champlain on September 1, 1851. This gave the Northern Railroad access to the markets in the growing New England cities. The shipment of agricultural products, especially butter, from New York farms to cities such as Boston was an sizeable part of the line's traffic. The company is alleged to have built and operated the first refrigerator car on an American railroad, starting operation in June, 1851 for shipping butter. Along with the rail line the company invested in docks and a grain elevator in Ogdensburg to serve steamship traffic.

=== Later History ===
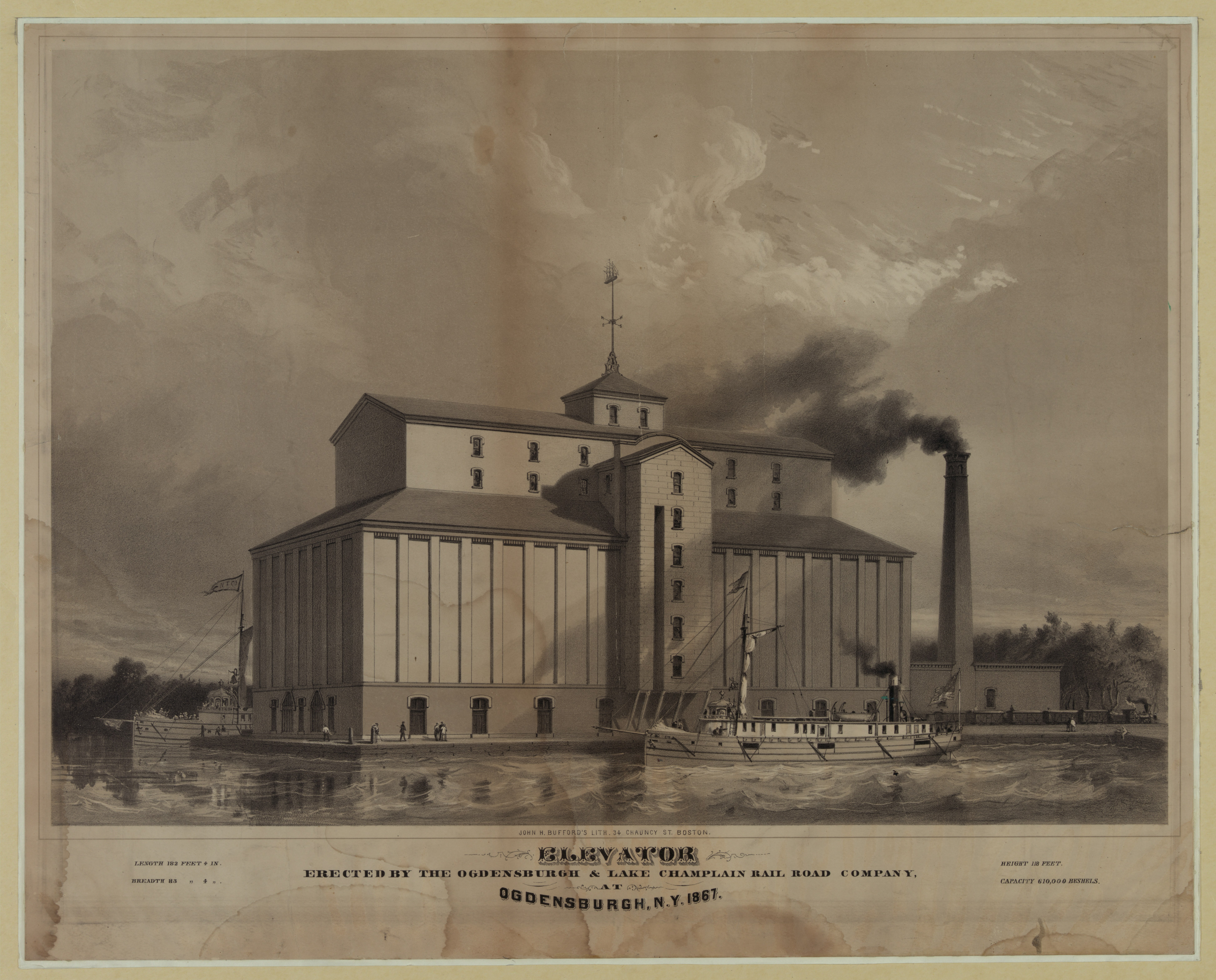
Elevator erected by the Ogdensburgh & Lake Champlain Rail Road Company at Ogdensburg, New York

The Ogdensburg Division represented the Rutland Railroad's expansion across the top of New York state, to the St. Lawrence River and a connection with ships to Great Lakes ports. The colorful rural route remained "the outpost" throughout its existence. A final strike, staged by unionized crewmen, led to the last revenue train in the Fall of 1961. The dormant rails gathered rust until 1964, when the easternmost 93 miles (150 km) from Rouses Point to Norwood Junction, NY were removed. The State of New York and Ogdensburg Port Authority assumed control of the remaining 26 miles (42 km) to Ogdensburg's grain elevators, seaport, and coal furnace for a state hospital. Several shortline operators leased the line, starting with the Ogdensburg & Norwood Railroad from 1967 through 1972. The Ogdensburg Bridge and Port Authority operated the track for a time after. Vermont Rail System subsidiary New York & Ogdensburg has operated the line since 2002.

The remaining portion of the O&LC is seeing growing business, with many track improvements during the summers of 2012 and 2013. Two veteran EMD diesels are the usual power for the average two or three trains a week.

Meanwhile, the lengthy, trackless wooden trestle crossing Lake Champlain from Alburgh to Rouses Point suffered severe damage in 2011, reducing the once mile-long behemoth to little more than matchsticks. The right of way crosses the top of New York State, where trainless depots remain at Mooers Junction (lovingly restored by Larry Marnes and Chris Trombley), Mooers Forks (a thrift store), Ellenburgh Depot (animal rendering facility), Chateaugay (brick, but decaying quickly), Malone (twin brick turrets remain, overhead walkway gone since 1949, now an Elm Street bank), Brushton (storage), Moira (church) and Lisbon (museum). Freighthouses remain at Winthrop and Champlain.

== Route and Station listing ==
Milepost	Town	Station	Image	Opened	Closed	Notes	Position
	Ogdensburg	Ogdensburg					
	Lisbon	Lisbon				Operating as Lisbon town Museum	
	Madrid	Madrid					
	Norwood	Norwood				Also known as Potsdam Junction. Junction with Rome, Watertown, and Ogdensburg Railroad	
	Norwood	Knapps				Also known as North Stockholm	
	Stockholm	Winthrop and Brasher					
	Lawrence	North Lawrence				Also known as Lawrence	
	Moira	Moira					
	Moira	Brushton					
	Bangor	Bangor					
	Malone	Malone				Vice President William A. Wheeler worked on the construction of the original station	
	Malone	Morton Siding					
	Malone	Malone Junction					
	Burke	Burke					
	Chateaugay	Chateaugay					
	Clinton	Churubusco					
	Ellenburgh	Brandy Brook					
	Ellenburgh	Ellenburgh					
	Altona	Forest					
	Altona	Irona					
	Altona	Altona					
	Mooers	Woods Falls					
	Mooers	Mooers Forks					
	Mooers	Mooers Junction					
	Champlain	Champlain					
	Champlain	Rouses Point				Junction with the Delaware and Hudson Railway and Vermont Central	
