= Jonathan Wallace (disambiguation) =

Jonathan Wallace (born 1986) is an American basketball player.

Jonathan Wallace may also refer to:

- Jonathan Wallace (Georgia politician) (elected 2017), member of Georgia General Assembly, United States
- Jonathan H. Wallace (1824-1892), United States congressman from Ohio
- Jon Magrin, Maltese/Jamaican rugby league footballer, formerly Jonathan Wallace

== See also ==
- Jonathan Wallace House, historic house in New York, United States
