= Ogdensburg, New York =

Ogdensburg Kaniatarahòn:tsi (Mohawk)
- City
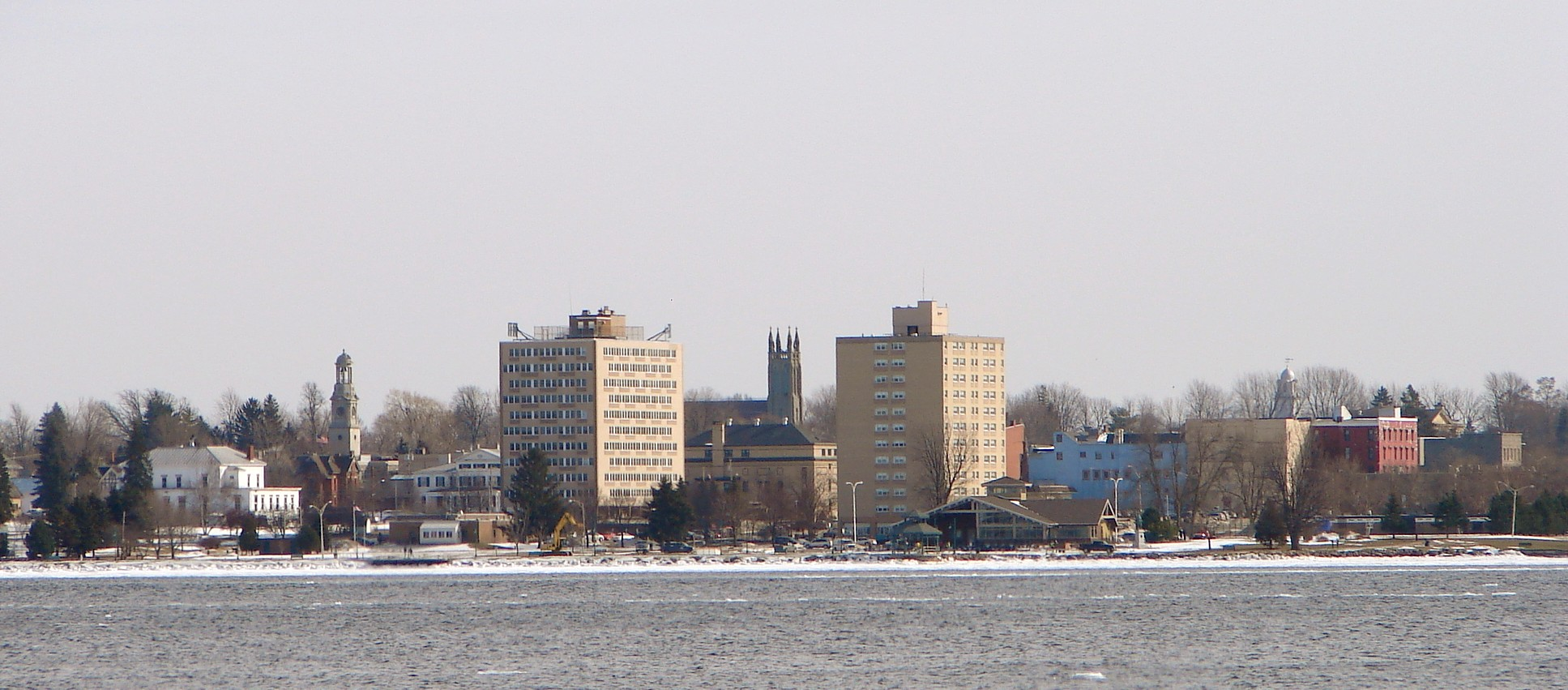

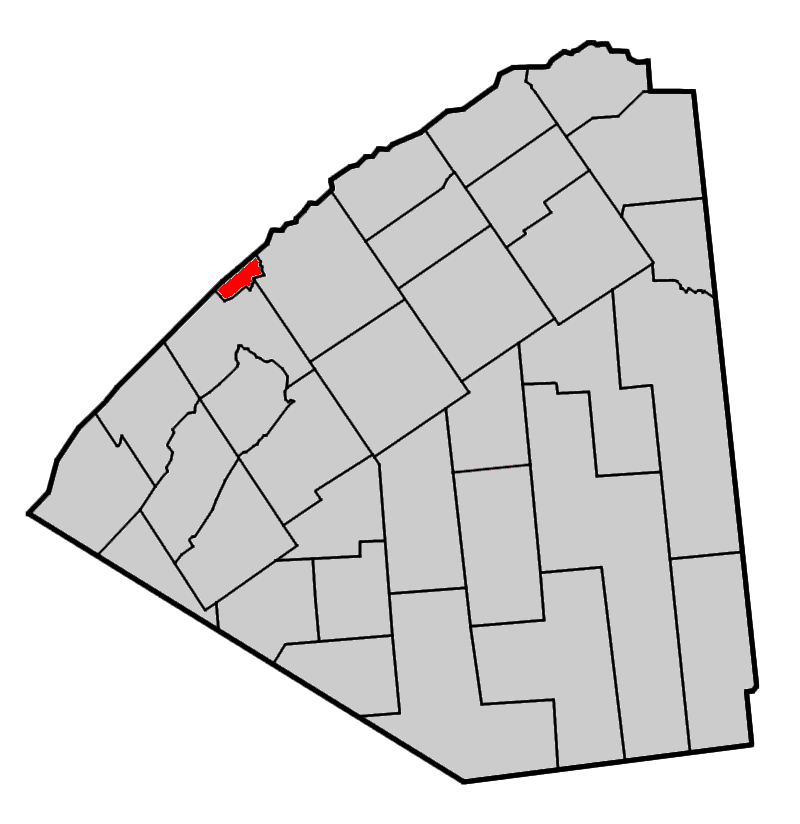
- Map highlighting Ogdensburg's location within St. Lawrence County.

- Location within the state of New York
- Coordinates: 44°42′N 75°29′W
- Country: United States
- State: New York
- County: St. Lawrence

Government
  - Type: Council-Manager
  - City Clerk: Cathy Jock

Area
  - Total: 8.14 sq mi (21.07 km^{2})
  - Land: 4.95 sq mi (12.83 km^{2})
  - Water: 3.18 sq mi (8.24 km^{2})
- Elevation: 300 ft (90 m)

Population
  - Total: 10,064
  - Density: 2,030.8/sq mi (784.11/km^{2})
- Time zone: UTC-5 (Eastern (EST))
  - Summer (DST): UTC-4 (EDT)
- Zip Code: 13669
- Area code: 315
- FIPS code: 36-54485
- GNIS feature ID: 0976759
- Website: www.ogdensburgny.gov

Ogdensburg is a city in St. Lawrence County, New York, United States. The population was 10,064 at the 2020 census. In the late 18th century, European-American settlers named the community after American land owner and developer Samuel Ogden. The city is at the northern border of New York at the mouth of the Oswegatchie River on the south bank of the St. Lawrence River. The only formally designated city in the county, it is located between Massena, New York, to the east and Brockville, Ontario, to the west.

The port of Ogdensburg is the only U.S. port on the St. Lawrence Seaway. The Ogdensburg–Prescott International Bridge, northeast of the city, links the United States and Canada, with a direct highway from Prescott to Ottawa, the capital of Canada.

== History ==
This territory has been inhabited for at least 2000 years by Indigenous peoples of varying cultures. By 1000 CE, Iroquoian-speaking people were settling along the St. Lawrence River and practicing agriculture, as well as hunting and fishing. The earliest French explorers recorded Stadacona and Hochelaga as villages of these people in the early 16th century; by the end of the century, later explorers found the villages abandoned. A distinct people, now called the St. Lawrence Iroquoians, inhabited the areas along the St. Lawrence River from before 1300 until the late 16th century. By the late 16th century, the St. Lawrence Iroquoians had disappeared from the St. Lawrence Valley, probably due to warfare by the Mohawk of the Haudenosaunee over the fur trade. By the time of later French contact, the Five Nations of the Haudenosaunee: Mohawk, Onondaga, Oneida, Cayuga, and Seneca, were allied in the Haudenosaunee Confederacy, based in present-day New York. Onondaga settlements extended up along the south shore of Lake Ontario. Both the Wendat people and Mohawk used the St. Lawrence Valley for hunting grounds and as a path for war parties.

The earliest European settlement in the area was a French mission named Fort de La Présentation (Fort of the Presentation), built by Abbé Picquet in 1749 as part of the colony of New France. The mission attracted Native Americans for the fur trade, many of whom settled in the village and converted to Catholicism. Mostly Onondaga, the converted Haudenosaunee at the mission became known to the French as Oswegatchie after their transliterated name for the river. By 1755, there were 3,000 Haudenosaunee living at the mission settlement. The Oswegatchie became known as one of the Seven Nations of Canada. The residents were hostile to the encroachments of British colonists on their territory. During the 1750s and the French and Indian War, warriors from this fort allied with French officers in attacking British colonists in the Champlain, Mohawk and Ohio valleys.

The city is near the site of the 1760 Battle of the Thousand Islands between British and French forces during the Seven Years' War (known in the later United States as the French and Indian War.) After the British victory in the war, France ceded its land in Canada and east of the Mississippi to England. The English renamed this installation as Fort Oswegatchie, after the native name for the river. As with the other mission settlements, the British did not disturb the relationship of the Oswegatchie, as they called the native people, and their Catholic priests. The British considered this community part of Lower Canada or Quebec province. The village remained under British rule until 1796 following the American Revolutionary War. With the northern border redefined by Jay's Treaty, the settlement became part of United States territory.

The first settlers under an American flag arrived that year in 1796. American settlers essentially drove the Oswegatchie, former British allies, out of the area; many went to Akwesasne or other Mohawk reserves in Canada. New American residents named the village Ogdensburgh after Samuel Ogden, an early landowner. The community developed around this early settlement, which was designated the county seat from 1802 to 1828. During the War of 1812, the city was captured by British forces to end the partial blockade on the St. Lawrence River and harassment that had been conducted from the community. In the absence of US troops, the local merchants restored an extensive trade with Canadian towns across the river.

The community was incorporated as a village in 1817 and chartered as the City of Ogdensburg in 1868. This post-Civil War period saw Ogdensburg as a location of Fenian activity. Thomas Miller Beach spent some time in fall of 1868 in the city in his activities with the Fenian Brotherhood.

In 1940, the town was the site of the signing of the Ogdensburg Agreement between Canadian Prime Minister Mackenzie King and United States President Franklin D. Roosevelt. This renewed the ties between the two countries after the 1939 outbreak of World War II in Europe. The celebrated German POW Franz von Werra escaped from Canada to Ogdensburg in a rowboat.

== Sports ==
Ogdensburg hosted various minor league baseball teams between 1900 and 1951. Ogdensburg (1900–1901), the Ogdensburg Colts (1936–1939), Ottawa-Ogdensburg Senators (1940) and Ogdensburg Maples (1946–1951) played as members of the Northern New York League (1900–1901), Canadian–American League (1936–1940) and Border League (1946–1951). Ogdensburg was an affiliate of the Philadelphia Phillies (1940) and New York Giants (1948). Teams played at Winter Park

== Climate ==
Ogdensburg has a humid continental climate (Köppen: Dfb).

Climate data for Ogdensburg, New York (1991–2020 normals, extremes 1893–present)
Month	Jan	Feb	Mar	Apr	May	Jun	Jul	Aug	Sep	Oct	Nov	Dec	Year
Record high °F (°C)	66 (19)	61 (16)	81 (27)	86 (30)	95 (35)	98 (37)	100 (38)	99 (37)	96 (36)	86 (30)	76 (24)	68 (20)	100 (38)
Mean daily maximum °F (°C)	25.9 (−3.4)	28.5 (−1.9)	38.1 (3.4)	52.2 (11.2)	66.3 (19.1)	75.5 (24.2)	79.7 (26.5)	78.8 (26.0)	71.2 (21.8)	57.1 (13.9)	44.5 (6.9)	32.2 (0.1)	54.2 (12.3)
Daily mean °F (°C)	16.9 (−8.4)	18.9 (−7.3)	28.8 (−1.8)	43.0 (6.1)	56.4 (13.6)	65.6 (18.7)	70.5 (21.4)	68.9 (20.5)	60.8 (16.0)	48.5 (9.2)	36.6 (2.6)	24.9 (−3.9)	45.0 (7.2)
Mean daily minimum °F (°C)	7.8 (−13.4)	9.4 (−12.6)	19.5 (−6.9)	33.8 (1.0)	46.5 (8.1)	55.7 (13.2)	61.2 (16.2)	58.9 (14.9)	50.4 (10.2)	39.9 (4.4)	28.7 (−1.8)	17.6 (−8.0)	35.8 (2.1)
Record low °F (°C)	−43 (−42)	−37 (−38)	−24 (−31)	0 (−18)	20 (−7)	31 (−1)	40 (4)	35 (2)	21 (−6)	14 (−10)	−7 (−22)	−42 (−41)	−43 (−42)
Average precipitation inches (mm)	2.76 (70)	1.79 (45)	2.58 (66)	3.04 (77)	3.11 (79)	4.13 (105)	3.86 (98)	3.65 (93)	4.03 (102)	3.90 (99)	3.10 (79)	3.26 (83)	39.21 (996)
Source: NOAA

== Historic resources ==
The Library Park Historic District, Judge John Fine House, Acker and Evans Law Office, New York State Armory, Ogdensburg Harbor Light, Oswegatchie Pumping Station, Ogdensburg Armory, Robert C. McEwen United States Custom House, United States Post Office, and Fort de La Présentation Site are listed on the National Register of Historic Places.

== Demographics ==
Historical population
Census	Pop.	Note	%±
1860	7,409		—
1870	10,076		36.0%
1880	10,341		2.6%
1890	11,662		12.8%
1900	12,633		8.3%
1910	15,933		26.1%
1920	14,609		−8.3%
1930	16,915		15.8%
1940	16,346		−3.4%
1950	16,166		−1.1%
1960	16,122		−0.3%
1970	14,554		−9.7%
1980	12,375		−15.0%
1990	13,521		9.3%
2000	12,364		−8.6%
2010	11,128		−10.0%
2020	10,064		−9.6%
U.S. Decennial Census

=== 2020 census ===
As of the 2020 census, Ogdensburg had a population of 10,064. The median age was 40.4 years. 19.7% of residents were under the age of 18 and 17.2% of residents were 65 years of age or older. For every 100 females there were 120.4 males, and for every 100 females age 18 and over there were 124.7 males age 18 and over.

100.0% of residents lived in urban areas, while 0.0% lived in rural areas.

There were 3,909 households in Ogdensburg, of which 26.3% had children under the age of 18 living in them. Of all households, 32.3% were married-couple households, 22.6% were households with a male householder and no spouse or partner present, and 33.7% were households with a female householder and no spouse or partner present. About 37.4% of all households were made up of individuals and 15.2% had someone living alone who was 65 years of age or older.

There were 4,355 housing units, of which 10.2% were vacant. The homeowner vacancy rate was 2.6% and the rental vacancy rate was 8.1%.

Racial composition as of the 2020 census
Race	Number	Percent
White	8,742	86.9%
Black or African American	691	6.9%
American Indian and Alaska Native	57	0.6%
Asian	82	0.8%
Native Hawaiian and Other Pacific Islander	1	0.0%
Some other race	160	1.6%
Two or more races	331	3.3%
Hispanic or Latino (of any race)	425	4.2%

=== 2000 census ===
As of the census of 2000, there were 12,364 people, 4,181 households, and 2,583 families residing in the city. The population density was 2,440.0 inhabitants per square mile (942.1/km^{2}). There were 4,531 housing units at an average density of 894.2 per square mile (345.3/km^{2}). The racial makeup of the city was 95.05% White, 4.92% African American, 0.80% Native American, 0.69% Asian, 0.06% Pacific Islander, 2.81% from other races, and 0.67% from two or more races. Hispanic or Latino of any race were 6.22% of the population.

There were 4,181 households, out of which 31.1% had children under the age of 18 living with them, 41.5% were married couples living together, 15.1% had a female householder with no husband present, and 38.2% were non-families. 32.3% of all households were made up of individuals, and 14.2% had someone living alone who was 65 years of age or older. The average household size was 2.39 and the average family size was 2.98.

In the city, the population was spread out, with 21.3% under the age of 18, 9.5% from 18 to 24, 35.3% from 25 to 44, 21.3% from 45 to 64, and 12.4% who were 65 years of age or older. The median age was 36 years. For every 100 females, there were 127.6 males. For every 100 females age 18 and over, there were 134.6 males.

The median income for a household in the city was $27,954, and the median income for a family was $36,236. Males had a median income of $32,358 versus $21,485 for females. The per capita income for the city was $12,650. About 14.2% of families and 18.3% of the population were below the poverty line, including 23.3% of those under age 18 and 13.6% of those age 65 or over.

== Education ==
Almost all of the city is in the Ogdensburg City School District, with a small portion in the Lisbon Central School District.

Schools in Ogdensburg include Ogdensburg Free Academy.

== Resources ==
Ogdensburg is home to the St. Lawrence Psychiatric Center, a mental health service provider offering both inpatient and outpatient services. The SLPC is part of the New York State Office of Mental Health (OMH) and serves the general public.

The city is the site of the Frederic Remington Art Museum. The downtown museum is housed in the former family mansion of local industrialist David Parish on Washington Street. While the house was always called the Parish Mansion, Eva Remington lived there as a widow after the death of her husband Frederic Remington. He was notable for his paintings of the American West. The collection of Remington art and memorabilia is based on items from the estates of Eva Remington and her sister Emma.

Ogdensburg is the site of two correctional facilities: Riverview and Ogdensburg, run by the New York State Department of Correctional Services One is located on the grounds of the former St. Lawrence Psychiatric Center. The other was built directly across New York State Route 37.

Ogdensburg is home to the former Academy at Ivy Ridge, a defunct facility for troubled teenagers. The facility was the subject of a Netflix documentary, The Program: Cons, Cults, and Kidnapping.

== Transportation ==
Beginning in the mid-19th century, Ogdensburg expanded on its role as a port city on the St. Lawrence River, becoming an important trading city and station as railroads were developed in northern New York and southeastern Canada. The Ogdensburg & Lake Champlain Railroad (later Rutland Railroad) (1849), Rome, Watertown & Ogdensburg Railroad (1853) and Portland & Ogdensburg Railway (never completed), all constructed lines through the area connecting the historic towns. In time, the RW&O was bought out by the New York Central Railroad. That passenger rail service ended in 1961.

The Ogdensburg-Prescott International Bridge was built in 1960, connecting Ogdensburg and Johnstown, Ontario. The roadways are NY 812 and ON 16, the latter a direct route to Ottawa, the capital of Canada. On the United States side, Ogdensburg is not connected directly to the interstate highway system. The border crossing has unused capacity on the bridge; although it has considerable truck traffic, volume is about one-tenth of that on the Thousand Islands Bridge.

Ogdensburg International Airport is located south of the city.

== Notable people ==
- Rick Carlisle, NBA head coach and former professional basketball player
- Lawrence S Churchill, colonel U. S. Army Air Corp
- Sally James Farnham, sculptor
- John Fine, United States Representative
- Charlie Gogolak, NFL placekicker, born in Hungary, younger brother of Pete Gogolak
- Pete Gogolak, AFL and NFL placekicker, first soccer-style kicker in pro football, born in Hungary
- Jimmy Howard, professional hockey goaltender for the Detroit Red Wings, member of the 2014 USA Olympic ice hockey team.
- Margaret Jacobs, artist
- Preston King, Collector of the Port of New York
- James A. Lindsay, mathematician, author, and cultural critic
- George R. Malby, former U.S. Congressman
- Robert C. McEwen, United States Representative
- John Mosher, writer and film critic
- Audrey Munson, artist's model and film actress
- Robert Odlum, first person to jump off the Brooklyn Bridge
- Henry R. Paige, major general in the Marine Corps
- Frederic Remington, 19th and 20th-century American artist
- Brenda Romero, game designer and writer
- Mark Valley, actor and comedian
- Joseph Vilas, Wisconsin state senator and businessman
- M. Emmet Walsh, actor
