= Frederic Remington Art Museum =

Biographical art museum in the United States

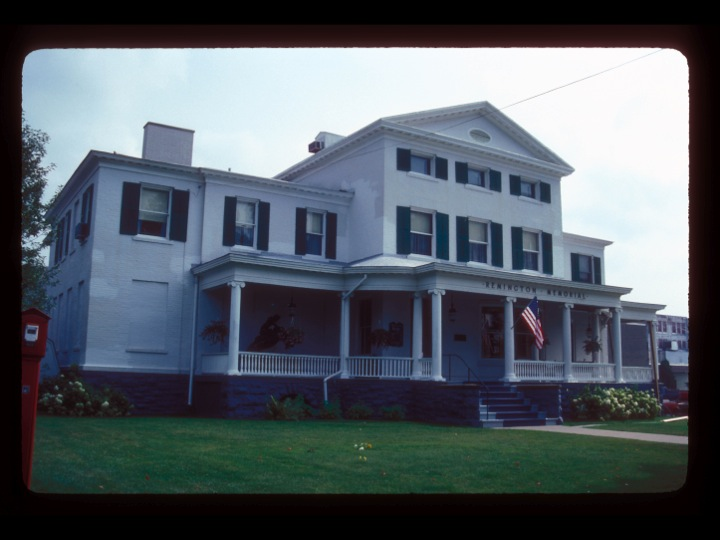
- Established: 1923
- Location: Ogdensburg, New York
- Coordinates: 44.69863°N 75.493683°W
- Type: Art museum
- Website: official website

The Frederic Remington Art Museum is a biographical art museum in Ogdensburg, New York, that focuses on the work of Frederic Remington.

== History ==
The building currently housing the museum was built in 1810 by David Parish. Although he only lived in the home until 1816, other members of his family occupied it up until the 1860s. After Frederic Remington died in 1909, his wife Eva moved into the house as a guest of Frederic's friend George Hall in 1915 and lived there with her sister until her death in 1918.

Eva Remington's estate became the Remington Art Memorial in 1923. Since then, the collection has expanded through purchases and donations, and it is now called the Frederic Remington Art Museum.

In 2026, the museum introduced a significant number of new exhibits.

== See also ==
- List of single-artist museums
