= Nathaniel Parmeter House =

Historic house in New York, United States

- U.S. National Register of Historic Places
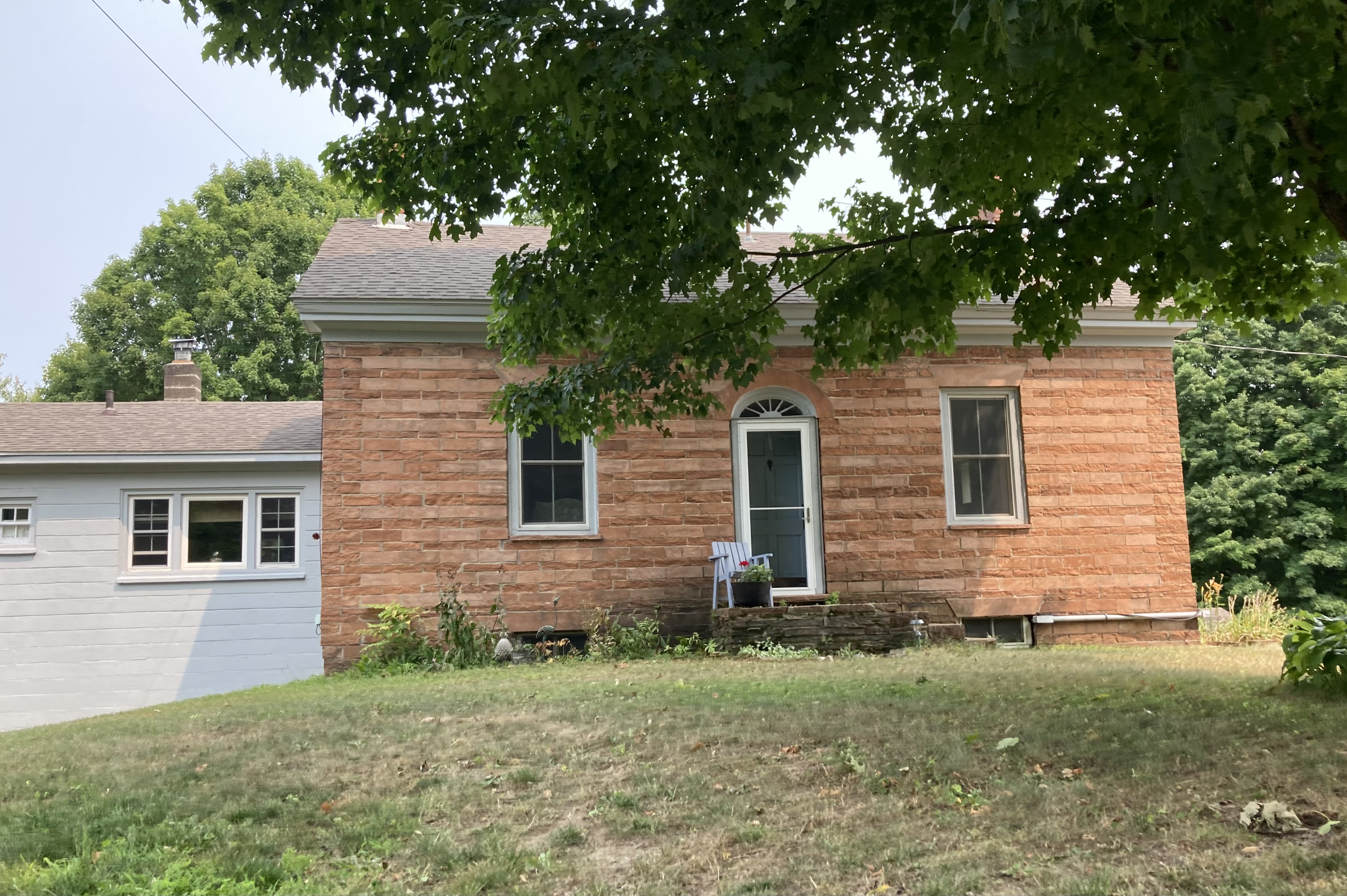
- The Parmeter house photographed in 2025.

- Location within New York Location within the United States
- Location: Potsdam, New York, U.S.
- Coordinates: 44°38′33″N 74°59′13″W
- Area: less than one acre
- Built: 1830
- Architectural style: Federal
- MPS: Red Potsdam Sandstone Resources Taken from Raquette River Quarries MPS
- NRHP reference No.: 03000027
- Added to NRHP: June 6, 2003

Nathaniel Parmeter Sr. House is a historic home located at Potsdam in St. Lawrence County, New York. It was built about 1830 and is a 1 1/2-story, three-by-two-bay, gable-roofed rural Federal-style residence constructed of red Potsdam Sandstone in the slab and binder style. A 1-story frame ell was removed in 1935.

It was listed on the National Register of Historic Places in 2003.
