= Robert C. McEwen United States Custom House =

- U.S. Customshouse
- U.S. National Register of Historic Places
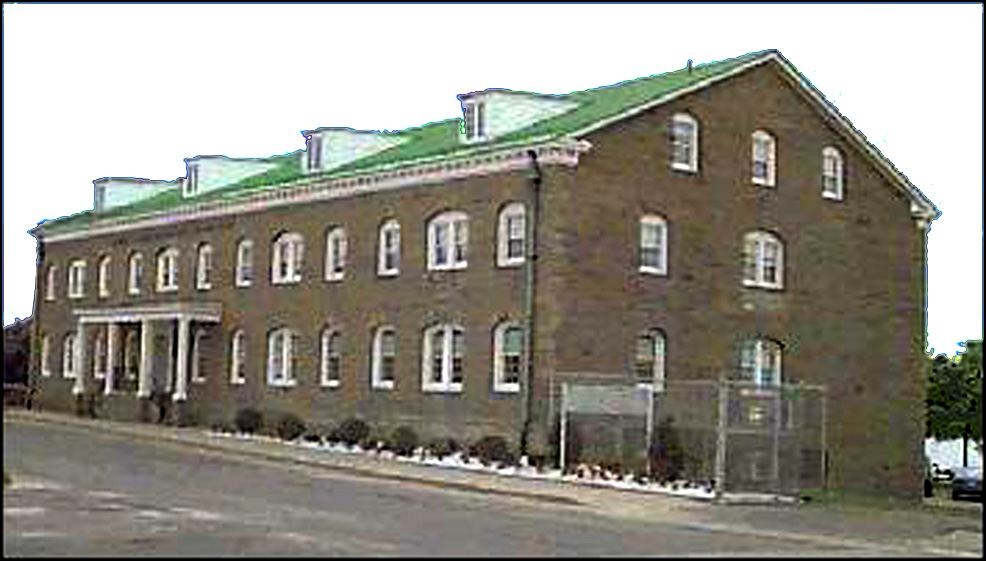
- Robert C. McEwan U.S. Custom House (undated photo)

- Location within New York Location within the United States
- Location: 127 N. Water St., Ogdensburg, New York
- Coordinates: 44°41′50″N 75°29′52″W
- Area: 2 acres (0.81 ha)
- Built: 1809-1810
- Architect: Church, Daniel W.
- NRHP reference No.: 74002205
- Added to NRHP: October 9, 1974

The Robert C. McEwen United States Custom House, also known as U.S. Customshouse, is a historic customshouse building located at Ogdensburg in St. Lawrence County, New York. It was built in 1809-1810 as a store and warehouse. It is a two-story, utilitarian, gable roofed, stone bearing wall structure approximately 60 feet wide and 120 feet long. The Federal government purchased it in 1936 and converted it for use as a customshouse. It is the oldest within the building inventory of the General Services Administration.

== Building history ==
Ogdensburg served as a regional distribution center during the early nineteenth century. Goods were brought to upper New York State via the St. Lawrence River and warehoused here, making the town a trade hub. The U.S. Custom House building originally served as a store and warehouse. It was known as the Parish Store and Wharf in reference to its first owner, David Parish. Parish, a German financier who immigrated to the United States in 1808, engaged master carpenter Daniel W. Church to oversee construction of the building.

In 1811, Congress established the U.S. Customs District of Oswegatchie (an Iroquois word meaning “at the very outlet”). According to local tradition, the Parish Store housed U.S. Customs Service functions by 1811 and this arrangement continued for almost sixty years. In 1870, Alfred B. Mullet, Supervising Architect of the U.S. Treasury, designed a new building to house the custom house and post office. Located at 431 State Street in downtown Ogdensburg, the building was listed in the National Register of Historic Places in 1977 and continues to function as a post office.

The George Hall Corporation, a shipping company, owned the Parish Store from 1880 to 1936. Likely due to needs for additional space, in 1928, the U.S. Customs Service moved back into leased space in the Parish Store. In 1936, the Hall Corporation sold the building to the U.S. government for $65,000. The building was renamed the U.S. Custom House. Over the years, the building was used for customs offices, patrol assembly, radio, record, and customs files rooms, a dormitory for immigration officers, and detention facilities. The U.S. Army, Air Force, and Marines also maintained offices here. Listed in the National Register in 1974, the building was renamed in honor of the late Robert C. McEwen, a U.S. Congressman, in 1982.

== Architecture ==
The U. S. Custom House is a fine example of the utilitarian buildings constructed in native limestone in the late 18th and early 19th centuries in the Ogdensburg region. Master carpenter Daniel W. Church supervised a group of French Canadian stonemasons who came from Montreal to work on its construction. The original building has excellent proportions (60 feet wide and 120 feet long) giving it a visual sense of lightness. While the original warehouse building began as a simple, unadorned, vernacular building, extensive modifications, undertaken in the 1930s, incorporated Colonial Revival-style elements. These consist of scaled door and window openings with elliptical arches, decorative cornice, dormers, and porch.

The building's core massing and roof remains much the same as when constructed in 1809–1810, save for the addition of shed dormers. At the front (east) facade the U.S. Custom House is a three-story, side-gabled building. As the site slopes to the west, the basement is exposed on other sides. Constructed of native limestone laid as fieldstone, with quoins at each corner, the building's load-bearing masonry walls are three feet thick in places. All masonry openings have segmental arches with voussoirs (wedge-shaped stones) of matching limestone.

After purchasing the building in 1936, the federal government modified the exterior and interior to reflect the popular Colonial Revival style of the period. Dormers and cornices supported by modillions (scroll-shaped brackets) were added. Most of the large loading doors were partially filled in with limestone and converted to paired windows. In 1958, a simple, one-story portico, similar to one constructed in 1937 and later removed, was added to the north Water Street side of the building. A small limestone addition was built at the southwest corner. These exterior modifications were done with restraint and sensitivity, leaving the character of the building largely intact, while accommodating its new use.

The building interior dates entirely from 1937, when a complete remodeling was undertaken at a cost of $125,000 to provide offices for the U.S. Customs Service. Vestiges of the 1809–1810 structure remain in transverse load-bearing masonry walls, the closets under the eaves of the third floor, and the original beams.

Distinctive interior features include the vestibule, lobby and information desk, center stairway, cashier's office, and public and private collectors offices. From the main entry on the front facade, a small vestibule opens into the lobby. In the lobby are bulletin cases of glass and wood marked “Immigration” and “Customs,” and a wood building directory. A recessed area contains a wood-panel information desk with a hinged gate. In the wall behind the desk, a shallow, elaborately detailed closet was built into one of the original arches in the masonry bearing wall.

The first-floor corridor opens off the lobby and is T-shaped, with painted plaster walls and ceiling. There are original (1937) wood baseboards and chair rail with abstracted triglyph (three vertical band) design. The ceilings of the lobby have a molded plaster cornice; the corridor ceilings have a plain cornice band. At the westernmost end of the east-west corridor is a built-in, paneled wooden service counter. The counter is enclosed with a centered operable window, flanked by two fixed windows. This is the original site of the cashier's office.

== Significant events ==
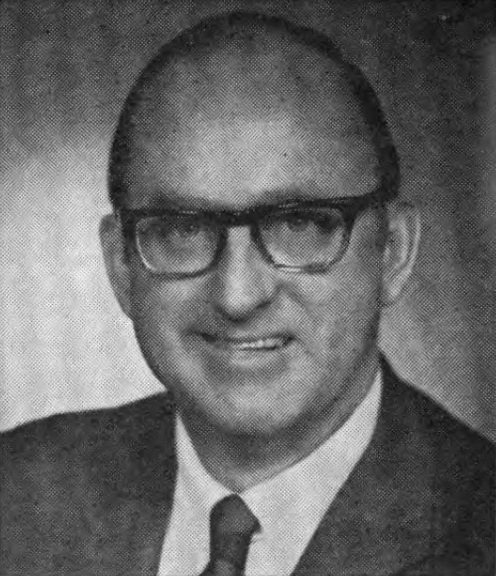
Robert C. McEwen, New York Congressman, 1965-1981

- 1809-1810: David Parish builds a stone store and warehouse on the waterfront
- 1811–1870: U.S. Customs Service is purported to have occupied the building
- 1880: George Hall Corporation purchases building
- 1928: U.S. Customs Service relocates to building
- 1936: U.S. government purchases and renovates building
- 1974: Listed in the National Register of Historic Places
- 1982: Renamed the Robert C. McEwen U.S. Custom House
- 2009: Building celebrates bicentennial

== Building facts ==
- Location: 127 North Water Street
- Architect: Master Carpenter Daniel W. Church
- Construction Dates: 1809–1810
- Architectural Style: Vernacular / Colonial Revival
- Landmark Status: Listed in the National Register of Historic Places
- Primary Material: Limestone
- Prominent Features: Three-feet-thick limestone bearing walls; Segmental-arched windows and doors; Wood cornice with modillions
