= Judge John Fine House =

Historic house in New York, United States

- U.S. National Register of Historic Places
- Location within New York Location within the United States
- Location: 422 State St. Ogdenburg, New York, U.S.
- Coordinates: 44°41′46″N 75°29′29″W
- Area: 0.4 acres (0.16 ha)
- Built: 1823
- Architect: Pearson, Urias
- Architectural style: Greek Revival
- NRHP reference No.: 86000012
- Added to NRHP: January 9, 1986

Judge John Fine House is a historic home located at Ogdensburg in St. Lawrence County, New York. It is a 2-story, three-bay Greek Revival-style residence appended to an earlier 1 1/2-story rear wing, built about 1823. Both sections are built of local blue limestone and feature gabled roofs.

It was listed on the National Register of Historic Places in 1986.
