= Buck's Bridge Community Church =

Historic church in New York, United States

- Buck's Bridge United Methodist Church
- U.S. National Register of Historic Places
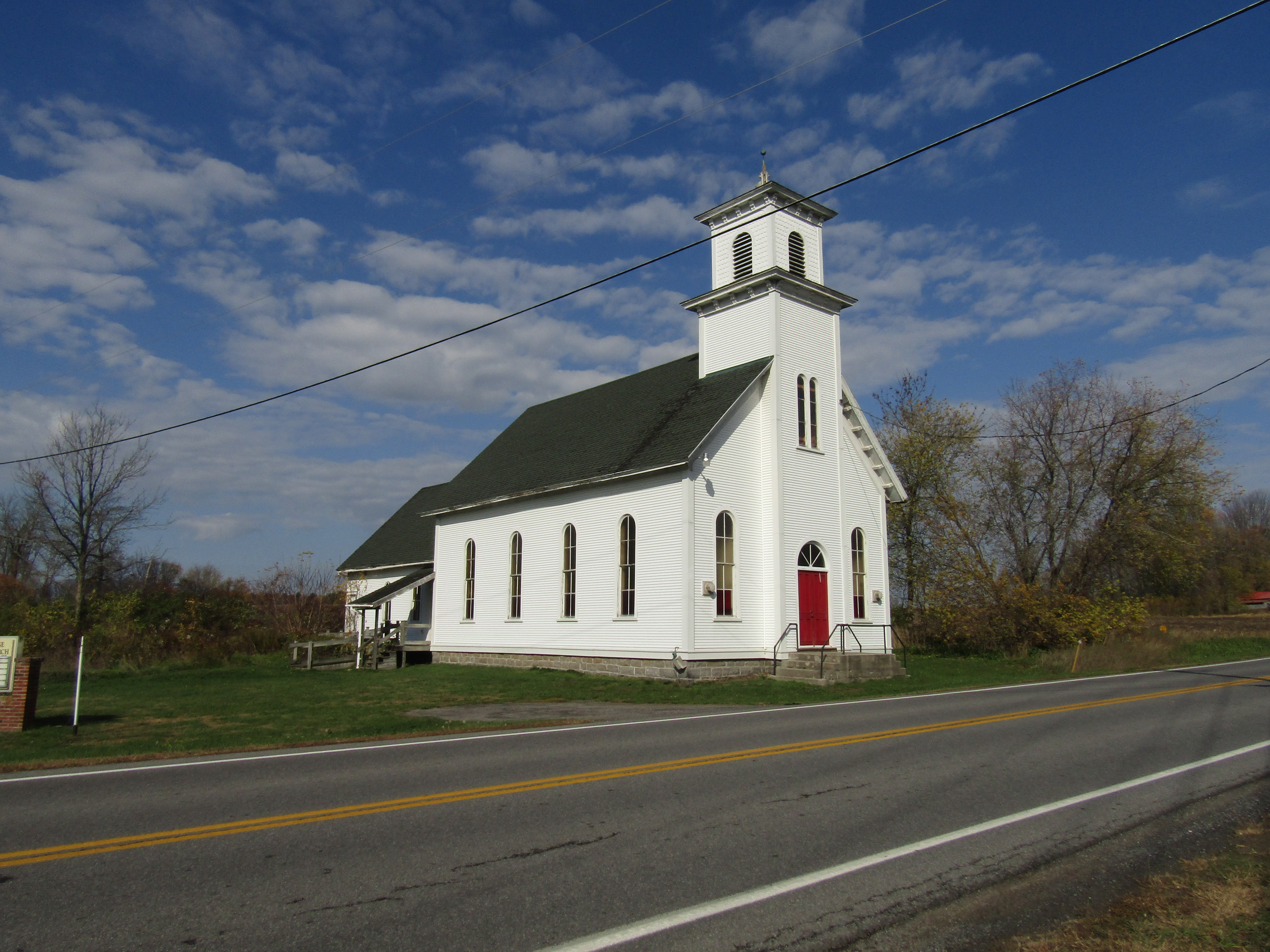

- Location within New York Location within the United States
- Location: 2927 Cty Rte 14, Buck's Bridge, New York
- Coordinates: 44°42′9″N 75°9′39″W
- Area: less than one acre
- Built: 1837
- Architect: Byington, John
- NRHP reference No.: 04000985
- Added to NRHP: September 15, 2004

Buck's Bridge Community Church, also (erroneously) known as Buck's Bridge United Methodist Church, was formerly a Methodist Episcopal church located at Buck's Bridge in St. Lawrence County, New York. The church later more closely followed the Congregational Church polity and theology. Services are no longer held, as the church closed following the resignation of the last pastor, The Rev. Dennis Lowe. The final service was December 9, 2018.

The church had worship services Sunday evening at 7:30 PM, with communion on the first Sunday of every month. Services were seasonal; for instance, the 2013 schedule ended with the December 8 service, to resume the following Palm Sunday in 2014. Monthly home services for communion were held over the winter.

The church's building was listed on the National Register of Historic Places in 2004. It was renovated with siding in 2010, keeping the look of white clapboard.

Moving the church to the site of the St. Lawrence Power and Equipment Museum in Madrid, NY, is being considered.
