= Ogdensburg Harbor Light =

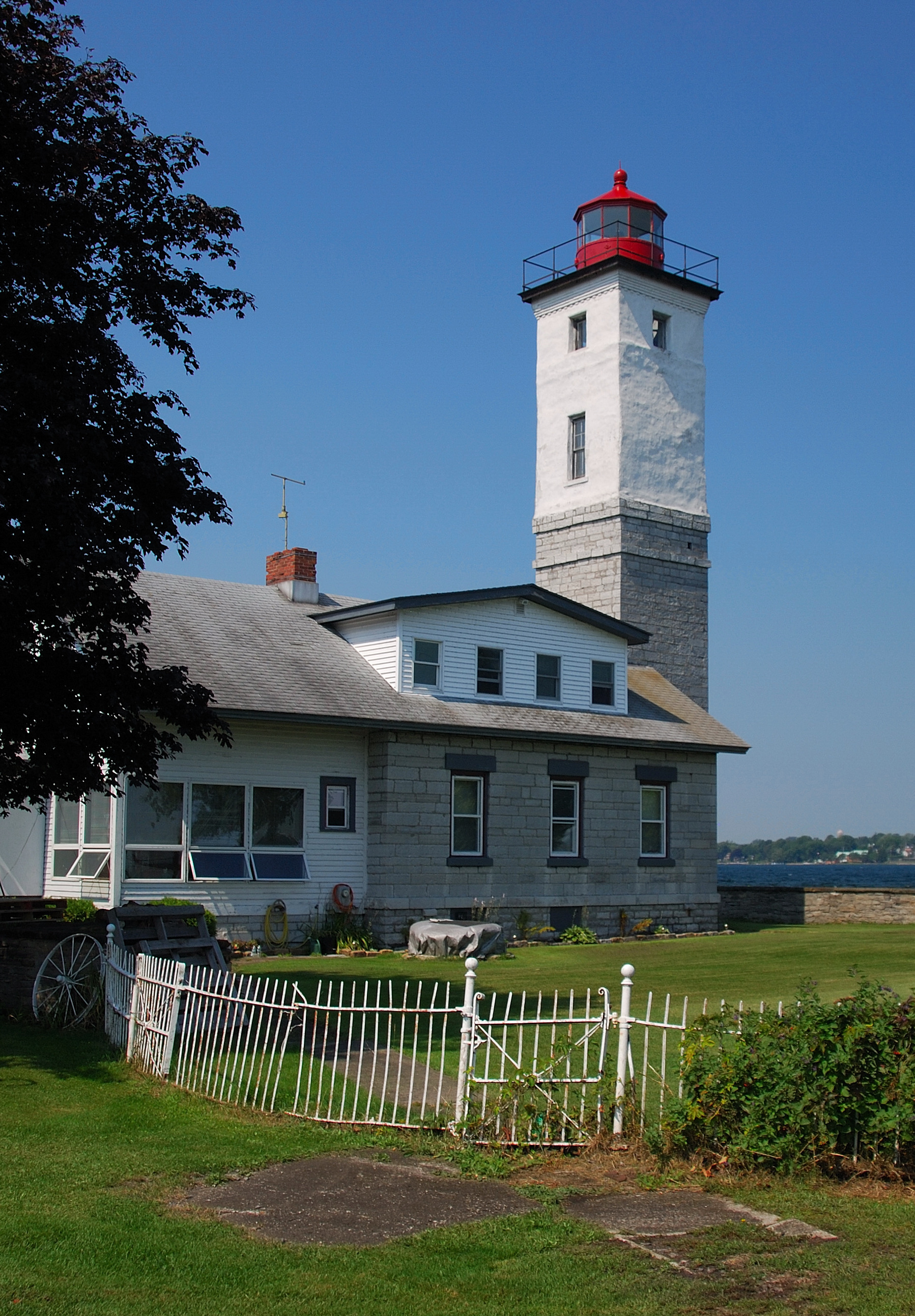
- Lighthouse in 2013
- Location: Lighthouse Point, St.Lawrence River, Ogdensburg, New York
- Coordinates: 44°41′52″N 75°30′12″W

Tower
- Constructed: 1834
- Construction: Limestone
- Height: 65 feet (20 m)
- Shape: Square
- Markings: White & Grey w/ Red Lantern
- Heritage: National Register of Historic Places listed place

Light
- First lit: 1900
- Deactivated: 1961-2011
- Focal height: 21 m (69 ft)
- Lens: Fourth-order Fresnel lens (original), unknown (2011)
- Characteristic: Fl W 10s
- Ogdensburg Harbor Lighthouse
- U.S. National Register of Historic Places
- NRHP reference No.: 16000202
- Added to NRHP: April 26, 2016

Ogdensburg Harbor Light is a privately owned lighthouse on the St. Lawrence River, listed on the National Park Service's Maritime Heritage Program as Lighthouse to visit. and as one of New York's Historic Light Stations. In 2016 it was listed on the National Register of Historic Places.

== History ==
An addition was made to the tower in 1900.

== Cultural ==
The Archives Center at the Smithsonian National Museum of American History has a collection (#1055) of souvenir postcards of lighthouses and has digitized 272 of these and made them available online. These include postcards of Ogdensburg Harbor Light with links to customized nautical charts provided by National Oceanographic and Atmospheric Administration.

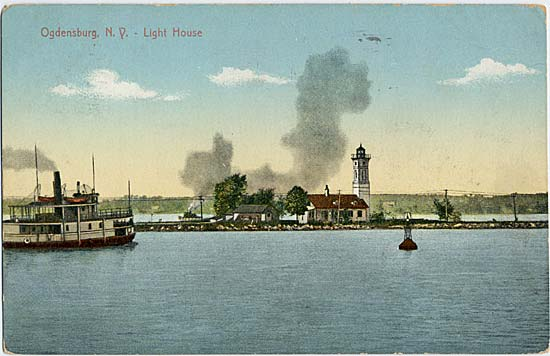
1911 postcard in the Smithsonian's collection

== See also ==
- List of lighthouses in the United States
- National Register of Historic Places listings in St. Lawrence County, New York
