= United States Post Office (Ogdensburg, New York) =

- U.S. Post Office
- U.S. National Register of Historic Places
- Location within New York Location within the United States
- Location: 431 State St., Ogdensburg, New York
- Coordinates: 44°41′44.5″N 75°29′28.5″W
- Area: less than one acre
- Built: 1867-1870
- Architects: Mullett, Alfred B.
- Architectural style: Classical Revival
- NRHP reference No.: 77001525
- Added to NRHP: August 16, 1977

U.S. Post Office-Ogdensburg is a historic post office building located at Ogdensburg in St. Lawrence County, New York. It was designed and built in 1867–1870, and is a two-story structure of regular ashlar stone blocks measuring 120 feet by 60 feet. It originally featured an octagonal domed cupola, but that was removed in 1906. It was designed by the Office of the Supervising Architect of the Treasury Department under Alfred B. Mullett. In 2009, the United States Congress enacted legislation renaming the building the Frederic Remington Post Office Building, in honor of painter Frederic Remington, who spent his formative childhood years in that city.

It was listed on the National Register of Historic Places in 1977.
