= First Presbyterian Church of Dailey Ridge =

Historic church in New York, United States

- U.S. National Register of Historic Places
- Location within New York Location within the United States
- Location: 411 Elliot Rd., Potsdam, New York
- Coordinates: 44°44′48″N 75°3′48″W
- Area: 1.6 acres (0.65 ha)
- Built: 1853
- Architectural style: Greek Revival
- NRHP reference No.: 02000300
- Added to NRHP: April 1, 2002

First Presbyterian Church of Dailey Ridge, also known as Reformed Presbyterian Church of the Town of Potsdam, is a historic Presbyterian church located at Potsdam in St. Lawrence County, New York. It was built in 1853 and is a modest, two story wood-frame building with a painted clapboard exterior and a simple, gable front, rectangular plan typical of mid 19th century rural churches. Located adjacent is the church cemetery.

It was listed on the National Register of Historic Places in 2002.
