= Congregational Church (Rensselaer Falls, New York) =

Historic church in New York, United States

- U.S. National Register of Historic Places
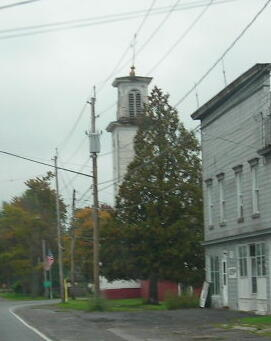
- The steeple of the former congregational church viewed from Rensselaer Street in 2006.

- Location within New York Location within the United States
- Location: 218 Rensselaer St., Rensselaer Falls, New York
- Coordinates: 44°35′33″N 75°19′7″W
- Architectural style: Greek Revival
- NRHP reference No.: 05001387
- Added to NRHP: December 8, 2005

The Congregational Church in Rensselaer Falls, New York is located at 218 Rensselaer St.

It was listed on the National Register of Historic Places in 2005 for the architectural merit of the church.

It was built in the Greek revival style.
