= French Family Farm =

- U.S. National Register of Historic Places
- Location within New York Location within the United States
- Nearest city: Potsdam, New York, U.S.
- Coordinates: 44°38′18″N 75°4′18″W
- Area: 9 acres (3.6 ha)
- Built: 1815
- Architect: David French
- Architectural style: Federal
- NRHP reference No.: 82001269
- Added to NRHP: November 4, 1982

French Family Farm is a historic family farm located at Potsdam in St. Lawrence County, New York. The farmhouse was built in 1815 as a five bay house and extended to its present two bay, nine bay size by 1820. It is a timber-framed structure with clapboard siding. Also on the property is a barn built about 1900.

It was listed on the National Register of Historic Places in 1982.
