= Library Park Historic District (Ogdensburg, New York) =

Historic district in New York, United States

- U.S. National Register of Historic Places
- U.S. Historic district
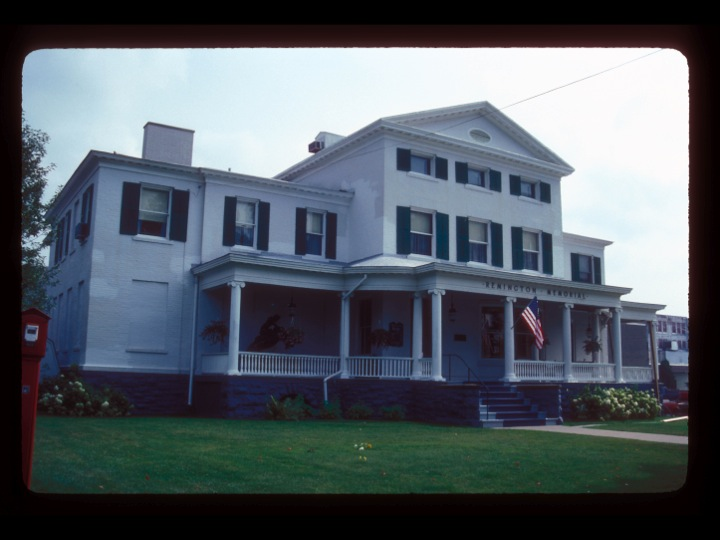

- Location within New York Location within the United States
- Location: 303-323 Washington St., 100-112 Carolina St., and Library Park, Ogdensburg, New York, U.S.
- Coordinates: 44°41′58″N 75°29′37″W
- Area: 7 acres (2.8 ha)
- Architect: Multiple
- Architectural style: Queen Anne, Federal
- NRHP reference No.: 82001270
- Added to NRHP: November 4, 1982

Interactive map of the district

The Library Park Historic District is a national historic district located at Ogdensburg in St. Lawrence County, New York. The district includes seven contributing buildings, one contributing site, and one contributing object. They include the Remington Art Museum (1809–10), Ogdensburg Public Library (1810), Library Park, and The Soldiers and Sailors Monument.

It was listed on the National Register of Historic Places in 1982.
