= Market Street Historic District (Potsdam, New York) =

Historic district in New York, United States

- U.S. National Register of Historic Places
- U.S. Historic district
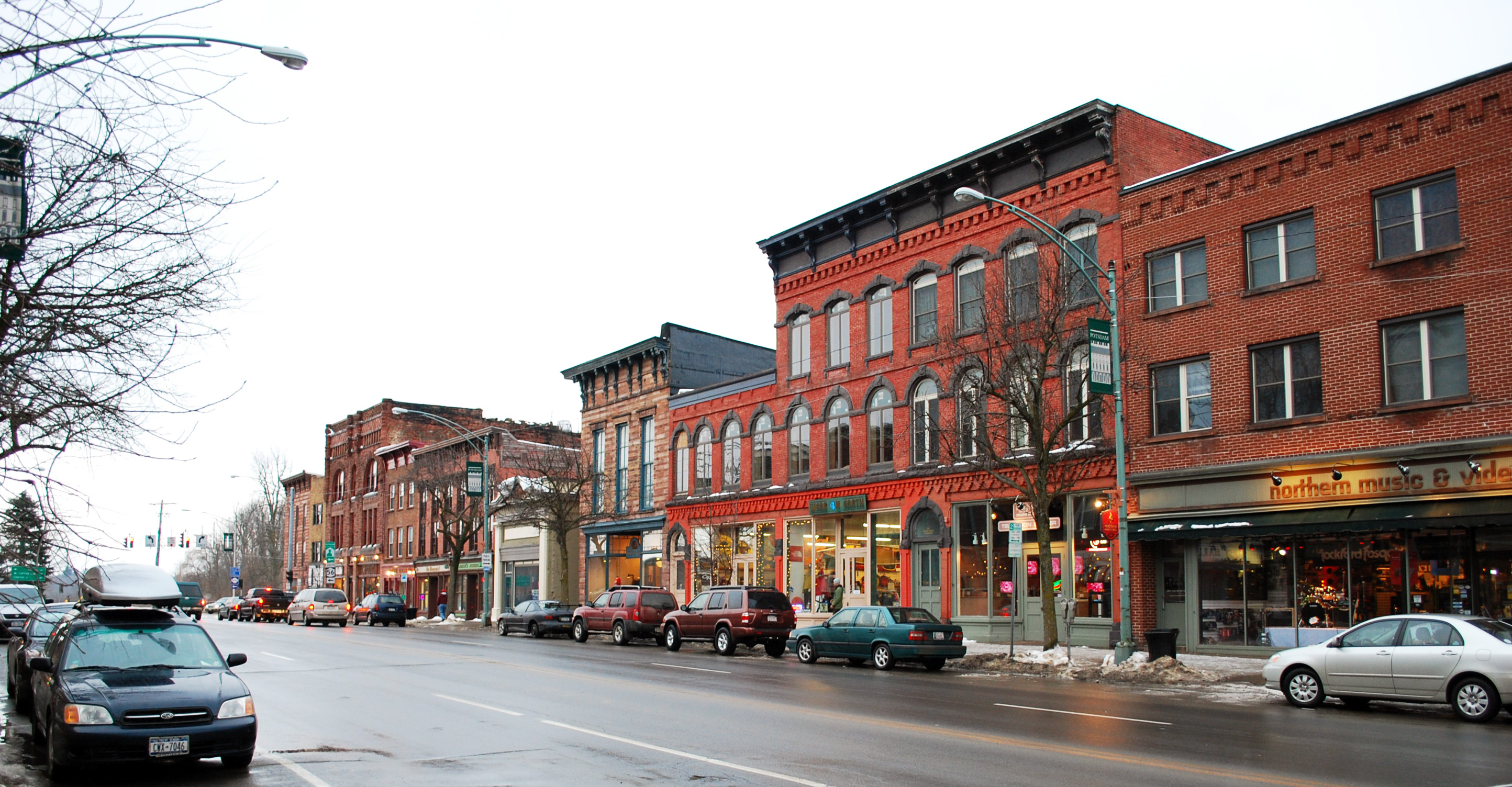
- Market Street Historic District, January 2010

- Location within New York Location within the United States
- Location: Market and Raymond Sts., Potsdam, New York
- Coordinates: 44°40′13″N 74°59′12″W
- Area: 8 acres (3.2 ha)
- Built: 1820
- Architect: Multiple
- Architectural style: Italianate, Romanesque, Federal
- NRHP reference No.: 79003171
- Added to NRHP: November 16, 1979

Market Street Historic District is a national historic district located in Potsdam, St. Lawrence County, New York. The district includes 27 contributing buildings, dated from 1820 to 1900. The district encompasses the remaining 19th-century commercial core of the village.

It was listed on the National Register of Historic Places in 1979.

== Gallery ==
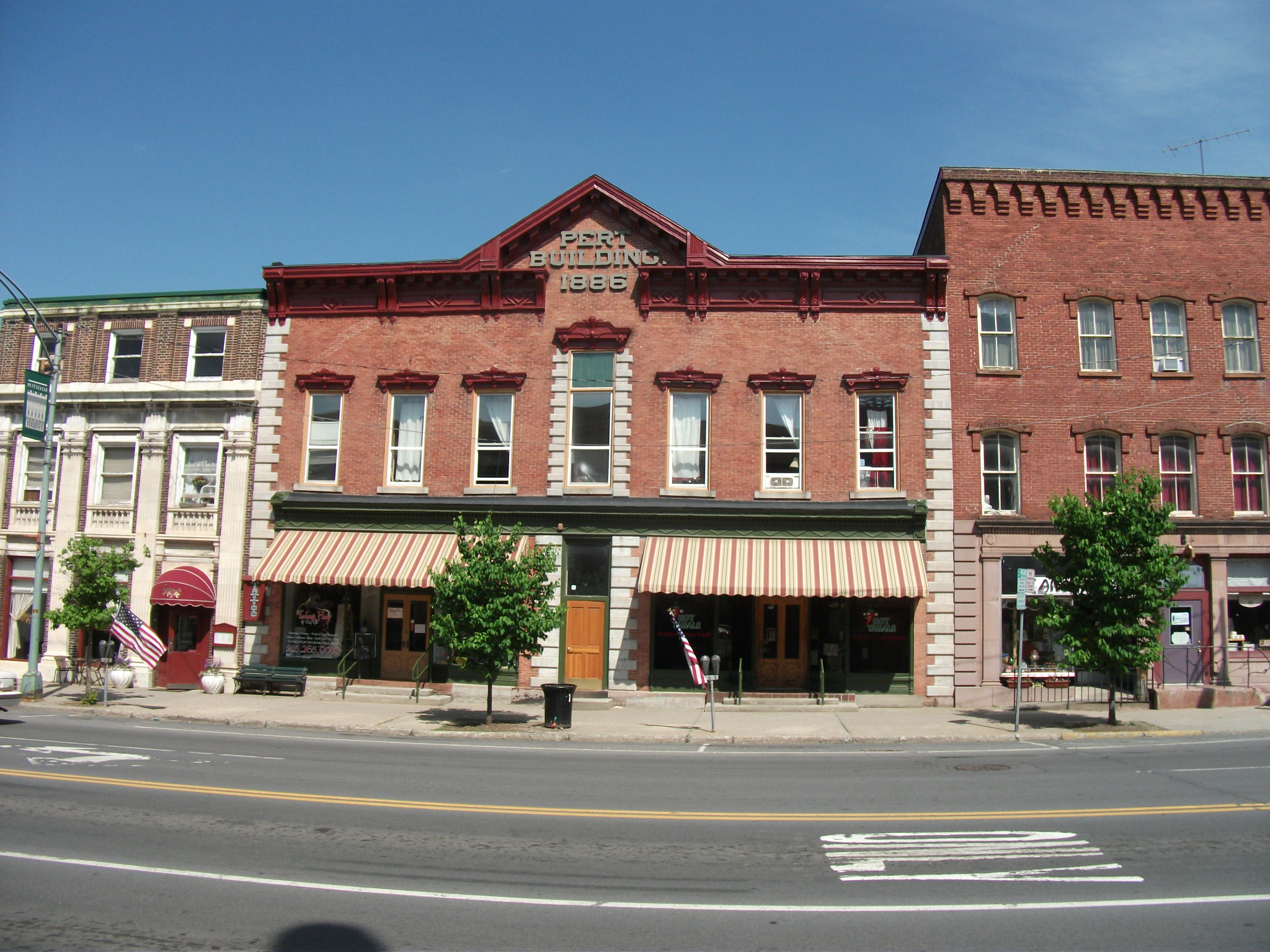
Market Street Historic District, May 2011

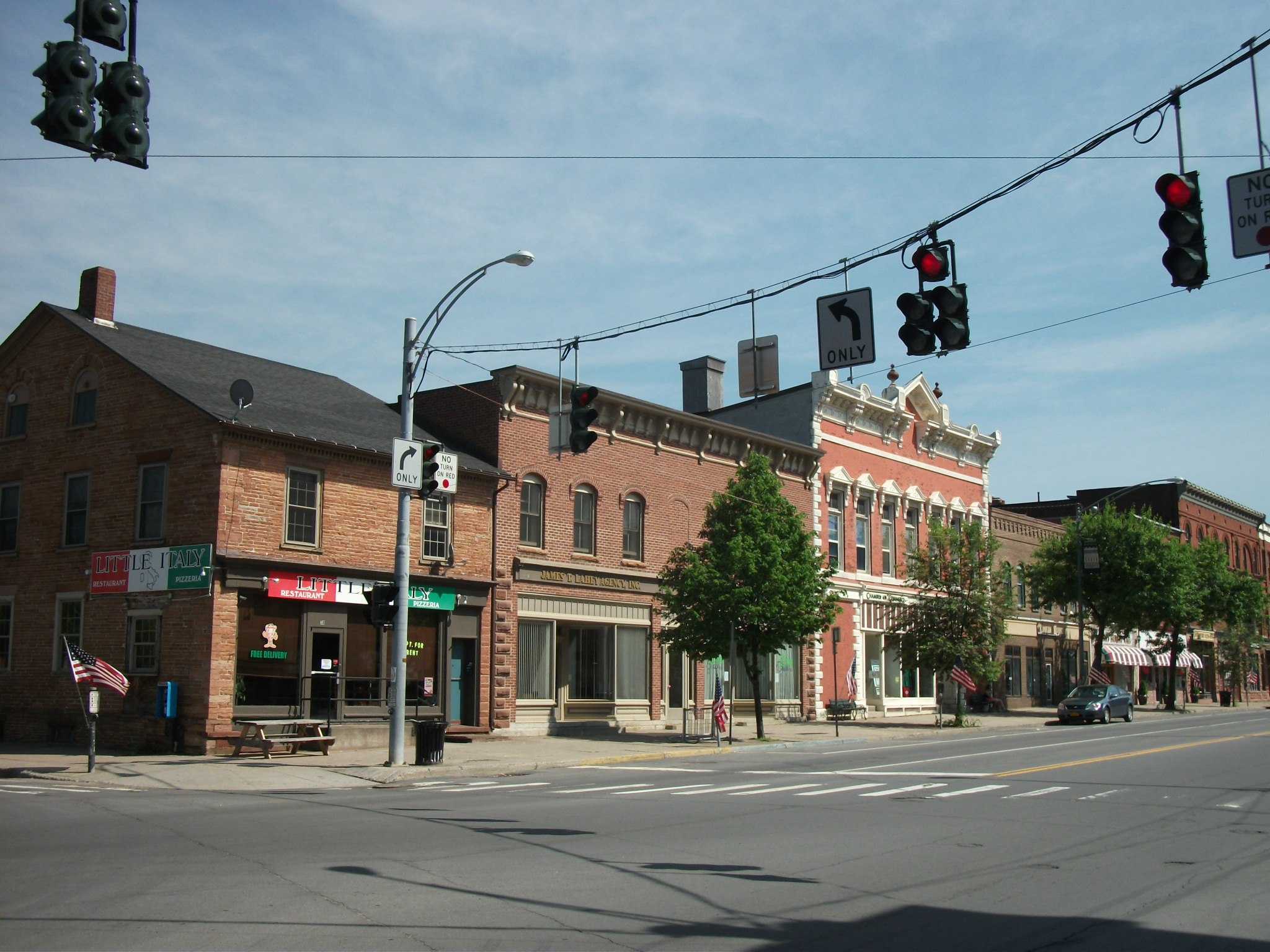
Market Street Historic District

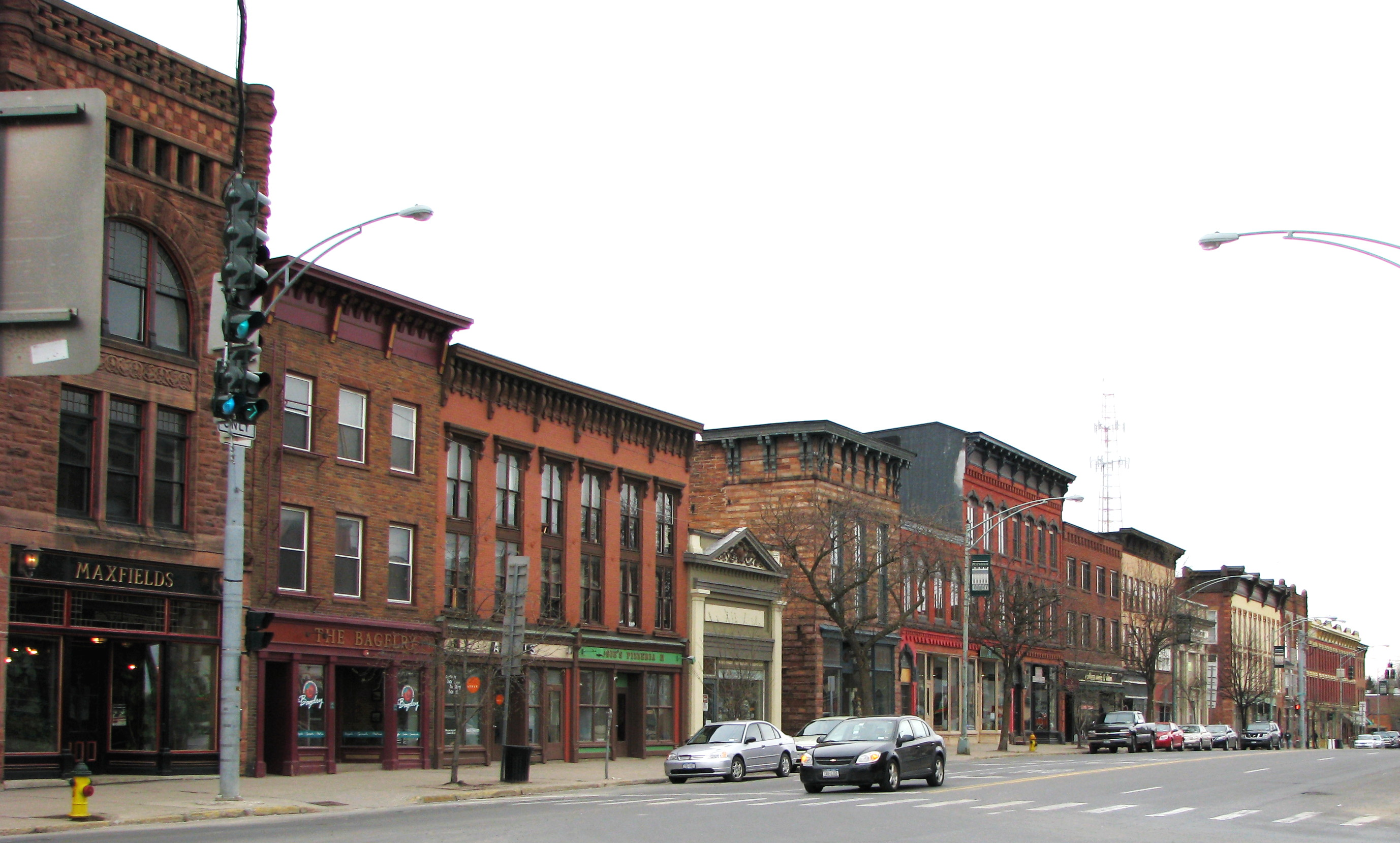
Market Street Historic District

== See also ==
- National Register of Historic Places listings in St. Lawrence County, New York
