= Morley, New York =

- hamlet
- Location within the state of New York
- Coordinates: 44°39′49″N 75°7′57″W
- Country: United States
- State: New York
- County: St. Lawrence
- Town: Canton
- Elevation: 374 ft (114 m)
- Time zone: UTC-5 (Eastern (EST))
  - Summer (DST): UTC-4 (EDT)
- ZIP code: 13617
- Area code: 315
- Website: http://www.morley.ny.us/

Morley is a hamlet in Canton, located in St. Lawrence County, New York, United States.

== Geography ==
Morley is on the Grasse River, 6 miles (9.7 km) downstream (north) from the Village of Canton, where the river passes through some rapids. Today, Morley is at the junction of St. Lawrence County Routes 14 and 27.

== History ==
Morley was first settled in 1810. It was originally known as Long Rapids. A post office was established in 1839, and the hamlet got its new name of Morley in that year. The post office has since been closed. In its heyday, the center of activity in Morley was the Harrison Grist Mill. At its peak, the hamlet had a population of about 300.

The Harrison Grist Mill and Trinity Episcopal Chapel are listed on the National Register of Historic Places.
