= Harrison Grist Mill =

- U.S. National Register of Historic Places
- Location within New York Location within the United States
- Location: NY 345; Morley, New York, U.S.
- Coordinates: 44°39′50″N 75°11′47″W
- Area: 0.2 acres (0.081 ha)
- Built: 1840
- Architectural style: Federal
- NRHP reference No.: 82004683
- Added to NRHP: September 16, 1982

Harrison Grist Mill, also known as Morley Grist Mill, is a historic grist mill located at Morley in St. Lawrence County, New York. It was built about 1840 and is a rectangular random ashlar, cut sandstone building with a simple gable roof.

It was listed on the National Register of Historic Places in 1982.
