= Ogdensburg Armory =

- U.S. National Register of Historic Places
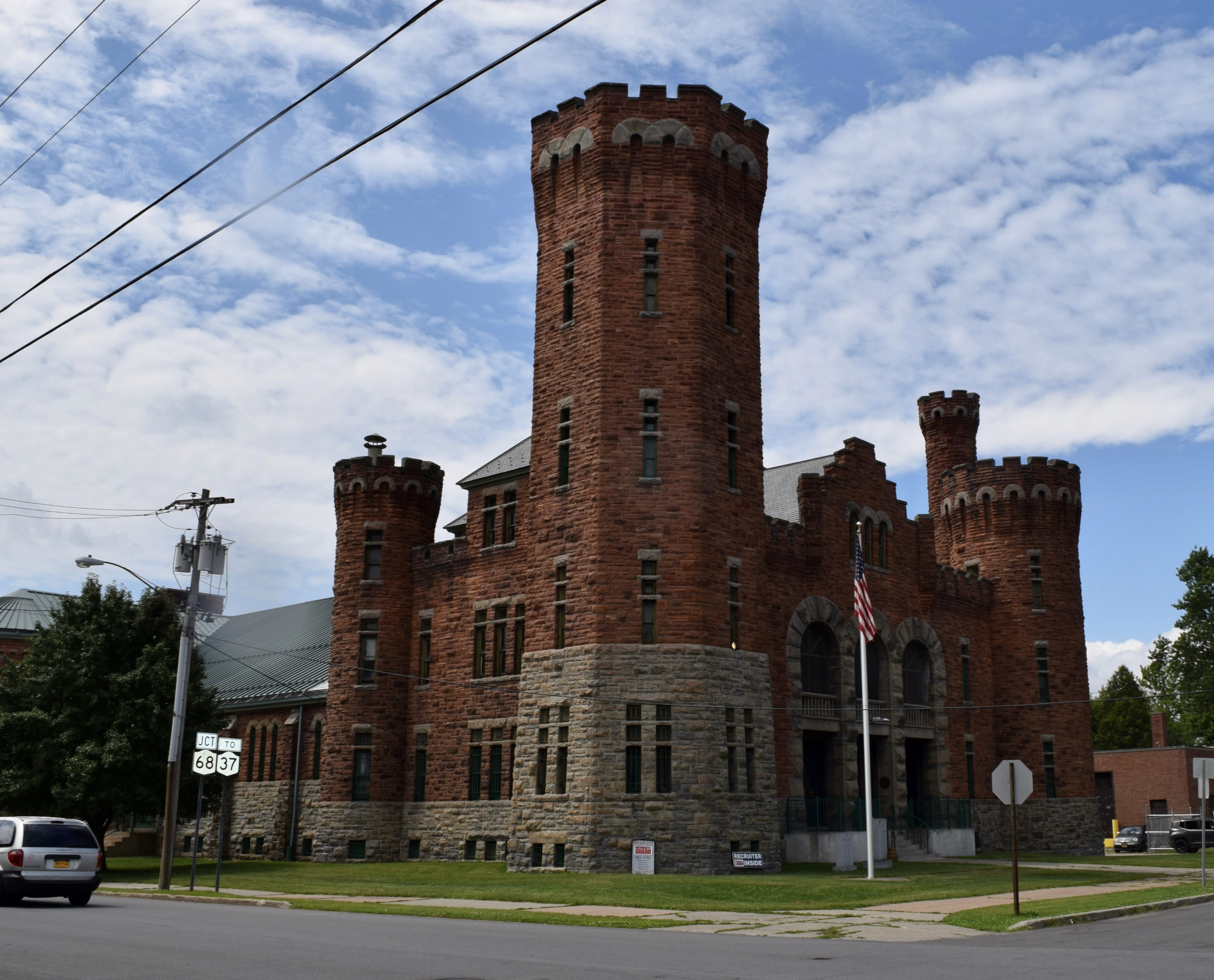

- Location within New York Location within the United States
- Location: 225 Elizabeth St. Ogdensburg, New York
- Coordinates: 44°41′57″N 75°29′23″W
- Area: 1 acre (0.40 ha)
- Built: 1898
- Architect: Isaac Perry
- Architectural style: Late Victorian, castellated
- MPS: Army National Guard Armories in New York State MPS
- NRHP reference No.: 95000088
- Added to NRHP: March 2, 1995

Ogdensburg Armory is a historic National Guard armory building located at Ogdensburg in St. Lawrence County, New York. It was built in 1898 and designed by State architect Isaac G. Perry. It consists of a 2-story, hip-roofed administration building and a large gable-roofed drill shed. It is built of load-bearing, reddish-brown Potsdam sandstone walls built upon a raised, rusticated, light-gray limestone foundation. The main block features 5-, 4-, and 3 1/2-story towers.

It was listed on the National Register of Historic Places in 1995.
