= Rensselaer Falls, New York =

- Village
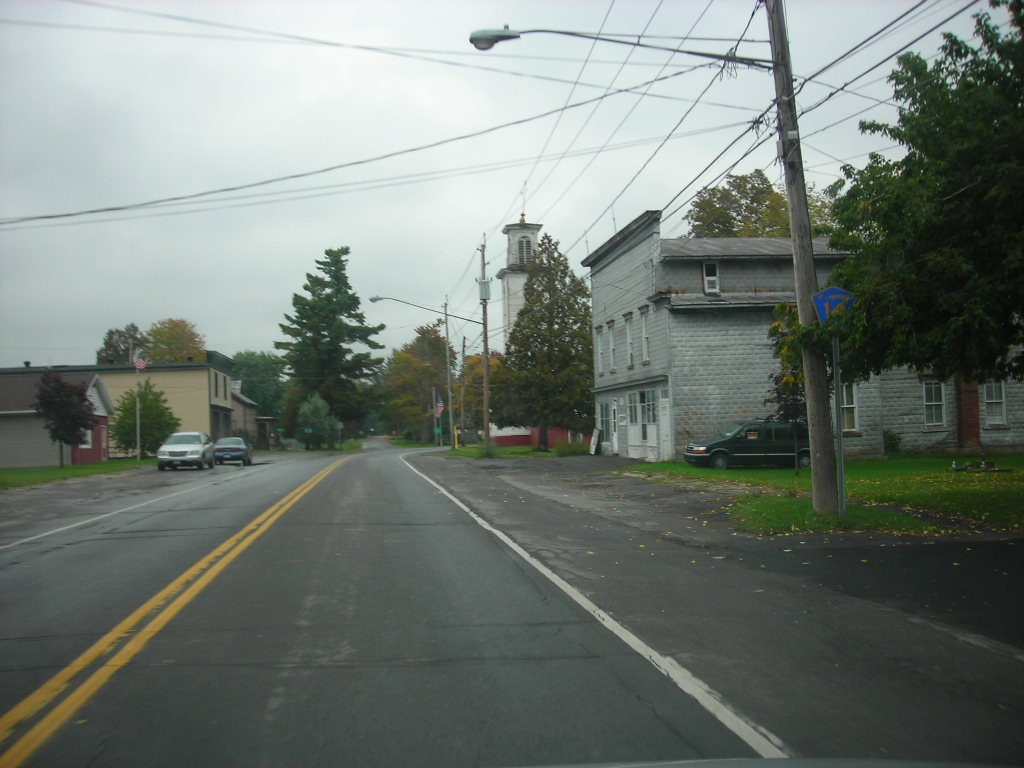

- Location within the state of New York
- Coordinates: 44°35′26″N 75°19′16″W
- Country: United States
- State: New York
- County: St. Lawrence

Area
  - Total: 0.32 sq mi (0.82 km^{2})
  - Land: 0.29 sq mi (0.75 km^{2})
  - Water: 0.027 sq mi (0.07 km^{2})
- Elevation: 330 ft (100 m)

Population (2020)
  - Total: 361
  - Density: 1,242.4/sq mi (479.68/km^{2})
- Time zone: UTC-5 (Eastern (EST))
  - Summer (DST): UTC-4 (EDT)
- FIPS code: 36-61159
- GNIS feature ID: 0976882

Rensselaer Falls is a village located in St. Lawrence County, New York. As of the 2020 census, Rensselaer Falls had a population of 361. The current name came from mill owner Henry Van Rensselaer.

The Village of Rensselaer Falls is in the western part of the Town of Canton and is due west of the Village of Canton.

== History ==
A six-foot (1.8 m) drop in the river attracted early settlers to the available water power. The community was first called "Tateville" and later "Canton Falls." The current name was established by the post office in 1851.

The Congregational Church was listed on the National Register of Historic Places in 2005.

== Geography ==
Rensselaer Falls is located at 44°35'26" North, 75°19'16" West (44.590673, -75.321134).

According to the United States Census Bureau, the village has a total area of 0.3 square miles (0.78 km^{2}), of which 0.3 square miles (0.78 km^{2}) is land and 0.04 square miles (0.10 km^{2}) is water. The total area is 6.25% water.

The village is on the bank of the Oswegatchie River.

The village is at the junction of County Roads 14 (Rensselaer Street) and 15 (Front/Heuvelton Street). Rensselaer Falls borders the Upper and Lower Lakes Wildlife Management Area.

== Demographics ==
Historical population
| Census | Pop. | Note | %± |
|---|---|---|---|
| 1920 | 328 | | — |
| 1930 | 285 | | −13.1% |
| 1940 | 265 | | −7.0% |
| 1950 | 323 | | 21.9% |
| 1960 | 375 | | 16.1% |
| 1970 | 332 | | −11.5% |
| 1980 | 360 | | 8.4% |
| 1990 | 316 | | −12.2% |
| 2000 | 337 | | 6.6% |
| 2010 | 332 | | −1.5% |
| 2020 | 361 | | 8.7% |
U.S. Decennial Census

As of the census of 2000, there were 337 people, 124 households, and 90 families residing in the village. Cows and dogs far outnumbered people. The population density was 1,147.5 inhabitants per square mile (443.1/km^{2}). There were 144 housing units at an average density of 490.3 per square mile (189.3/km^{2}). The racial makeup of the village was 97.33% White, 0.005% African American, 0.59% Native American, 0.30% Asian, 0.00% Pacific Islander, 0.00% from other races, and 1.78% from two or more races. 1.19% of the population were Hispanic or Latino of any race.

There were 124 households, out of which 41.1% had children under the age of 18 living with them, 50.8% were married couples living together, 16.1% had a female householder with no husband present, and 27.4% were non-families. 22.6% of all households were made up of individuals, and 9.7% had someone living alone who was 65 years of age or older. The average household size was 2.62 and the average family size was 3.04.

In the village, the population was spread out, with 28.5% under the age of 18, 8.6% from 18 to 24, 29.4% from 25 to 44, 20.2% from 45 to 64, and 13.4% who were 65 years of age or older. The median age was 36 years. For every 100 females, there were 93.7 males. For every 100 females age 18 and over, there were 95.9 males.

The median income for a household in the village was $30,417, and the median income for a family was $33,125. Males had a median income of $30,625 versus $17,125 for females. The per capita income for the village was $13,190. 12.1% of the population and 12.2% of families were below the poverty line. Out of the total population, 18.3% of those under the age of 18 and 0.0% of those 65 and older were living below the poverty line.

== Education ==
The village is in the Canton Central School District.
