= Trinity Episcopal Chapel (Morley, New York) =

Historic church in New York, United States

- U.S. National Register of Historic Places
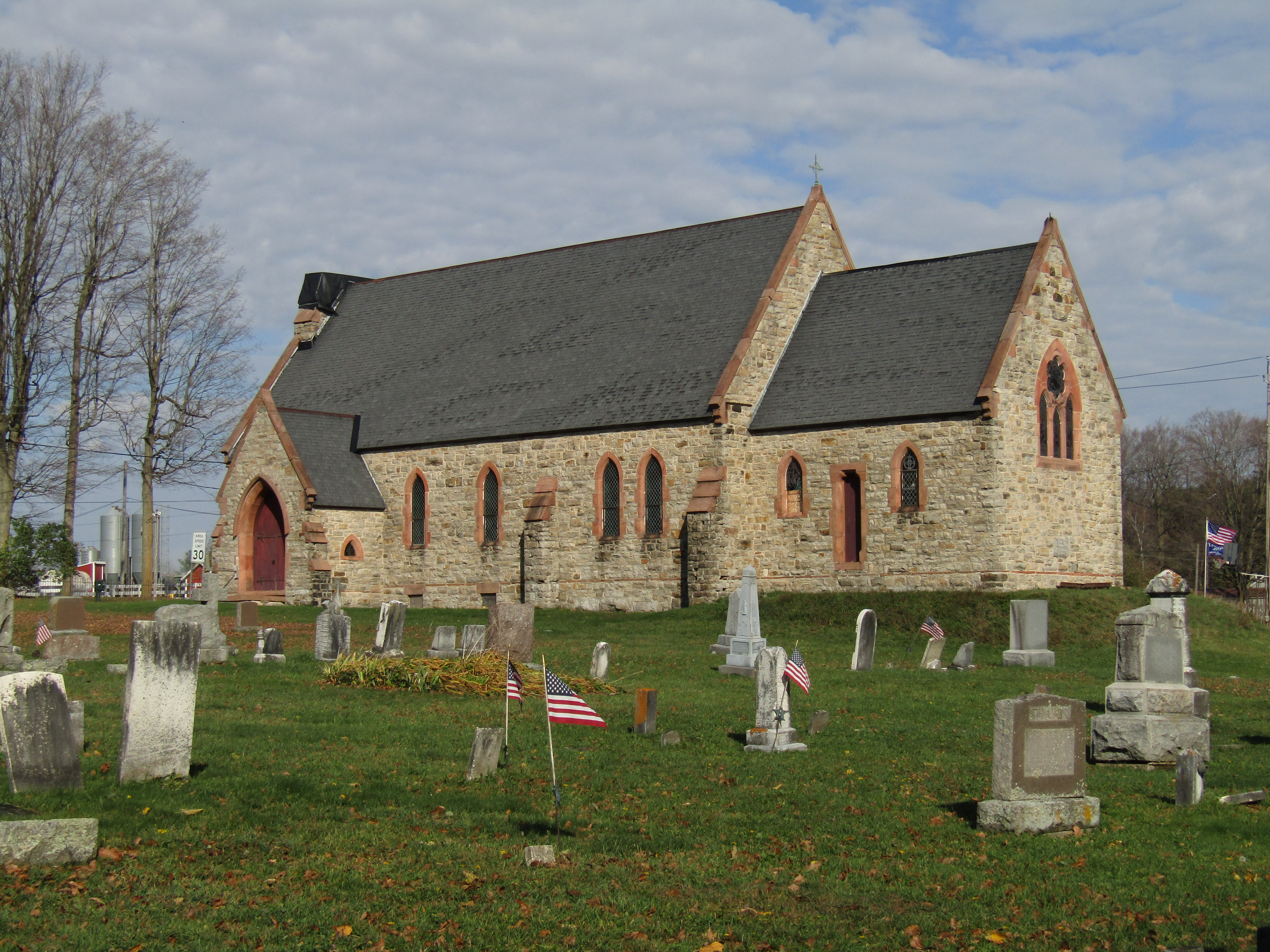

- Location within New York Location within the United States
- Location: Rt. 65, S of Morley, Morley, New York
- Coordinates: 44°39′44″N 75°12′3″W
- Area: 2.5 acres (1.0 ha)
- Architect: Charles C. Haight
- Architectural style: Gothic Revival
- NRHP reference No.: 90000003
- Added to NRHP: February 19, 1990

Trinity Episcopal Chapel is a 19th-century Episcopal church located at Morley, St. Lawrence County, New York, designed by the architect Charles C. Haight in the Gothic Revival style and consecrated in 1871. The sanctuary is 24 feet by 62 feet with a gable roof, and the chancel, a rear wing, measures 16 feet by 24 feet. The chapel walls are brick and faced with fieldstone.

It was listed on the National Register of Historic Places in 1990.
