= Oswegatchie Pumping Station =

- U.S. National Register of Historic Places
- Location within New York Location within the United States
- Location: Mechanic St. N of Lafayette St., Ogdensburg, New York
- Coordinates: 44°41′29″N 75°29′32″W
- Area: 1.9 acres (0.77 ha)
- Built: 1868
- Architect: Paquette, A.A.
- Architectural style: Late Victorian
- NRHP reference No.: 90000816
- Added to NRHP: June 11, 1990

The Oswegatchie Pumping Station is a pumping station on the Oswegatchie River at Ogdensburg in St. Lawrence County, New York. It was built in 1868 of random ashlar limestone. It is a two-story fortress like structure which features engaged tower projections at each of its four corners.

It was listed on the National Register of Historic Places in 1990.
