= David Parish =

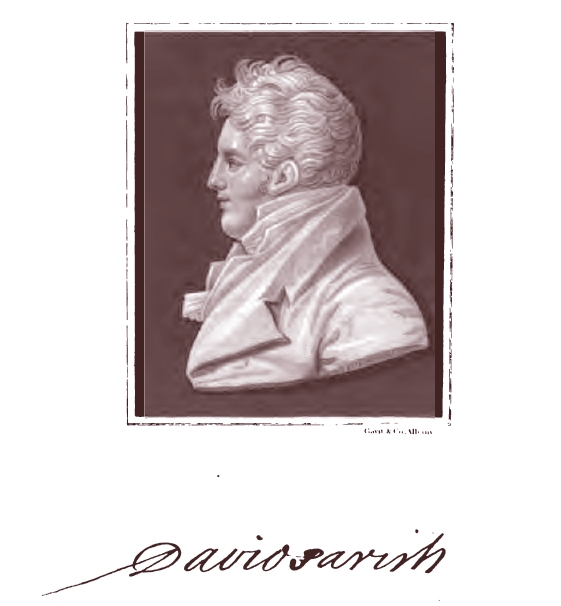
- Portrait and signature of David Parish. Portrait is from an engraved miniature painted on ivory in 1810.
- Born: December 4, 1778; Free Imperial City of Hamburg
- Died: April 27, 1826 (aged 47); Vienna, Austrian Empire
- Occupations: Merchant and Land Speculator

David Parish (December 4, 1778 – April 27, 1826) was a German-born land speculator and financier who played a major role in financing the United States military effort in the War of 1812 and in chartering the Second Bank of the United States.

== Early life ==
Parish was born on December 4, 1778, in Hamburg, then known as the Free Imperial City of Hamburg and a state of the Holy Roman Empire. He is the grandson of Scottish merchant John Parish, who had transferred his business to Hamburg from Leith, Scotland, in the 1750s.

== Life in America ==
Parish emigrated to the United States in 1806, settling first in Philadelphia, then two years later acquired 200,000 acres of land in the St. Lawrence River Valley to sell as farmland to settlers. Further adding to his holdings he profited greatly from arranging a large shipment of gold and silver bullion from Mexico to Napoleon's France.

He and his family played a major role in the development of St. Lawrence and Jefferson counties in northern New York state, where he made his home in Ogdensburg and built a blast furnace at Rossie. His 1810 built mansion is now home to the Frederic Remington Art Museum, and was occupied by members of the Parish family until the 1860s. The town of Parishville is named for him, where his family owned a sheep farm and grew hops.

Sympathetic to the anti-war Federalist Party, he nevertheless brokered a $7.5 million loan to the cash-strapped Republican administration of James Madison in 1813 to continue prosecuting the war. Historian Alan Taylor asserts that for that support, indispensable with Congress unwilling to raise taxes to fund the conflict, Parish gained the political leverage to insist on neutrality for the St. Lawrence Valley and peace negotiations with the British. Despite the strategic military importance of the St. Lawrence Valley, the US made only one half-hearted and disastrous attempt, in November 1813, to use it as an invasion corridor to attack Montreal and cut off the supply route from Lower to Upper Canada. The rest of the time, American and British interests continued their thriving transborder trade and generally peaceful relations as if there were no war between their countries, a fact Taylor attributes to Parish and his supporters and agents in the valley. Throughout the war, the focus of US military operations on land continued to be western Lake Ontario and the strategically marginal Niagara Peninsula.

In May 1816, Parish became an American citizen; he returned to Europe in the same year and served as the American consul in Antwerp from 1819 to 1823. He was removed from office due to controversial loans made to Emperor Francis of Austria for a military campaign against Italian independence, which was against the US foreign policy position

== Later years and Death ==
Because of an Austrian bank fraud he lost his fortune and, in 1826, drowned himself in the Danube River. He was buried in the cemetery at Währing.

== In popular culture ==
Parish was the basis for a character in the novel Anthony Adverse by Hervey Allen.
