= Lisbon station (New York) =

Lisbon

General information
- Line: Ogdensburg and Lake Champlain Railroad
- Tracks: 2

History
- Opened: 1850
- Closed: 1961
- Rebuilt: 1930

Former services
Preceding station	Rutland Railroad	Following station
Ogdensburg Terminus	Ogdensburgh–Alburgh	Madrid toward Alburgh
- Lisbon Railroad Depot
- U.S. National Register of Historic Places
- Location within New York Location within the United States
- Location: 6936 Cty Rd. 10, Lisbon, New York
- Coordinates: 44°43′39″N 75°19′9″W
- Area: less than one acre
- Built: 1930
- Architectural style: Bungalow/Craftsman
- NRHP reference No.: 00001422
- Added to NRHP: November 22, 2000
Location

Lisbon Railroad Depot is a historic railway station located at Lisbon in St. Lawrence County, New York. Lisbon was first served with a station in the 1850s by the Ogdensburg and Lake Champlain Railroad. The current building was built in 1930 as the second reconstruction of a railway depot at Lisbon by the Rutland Railway. It is a one-story, frame building, measuring 23 feet by 68 feet with a hipped roof and wide overhanging eaves. It closed as a depot in 1961 and is now the town museum.

It was listed on the National Register of Historic Places in 2000.
