= Potsdam, New York =

- Town
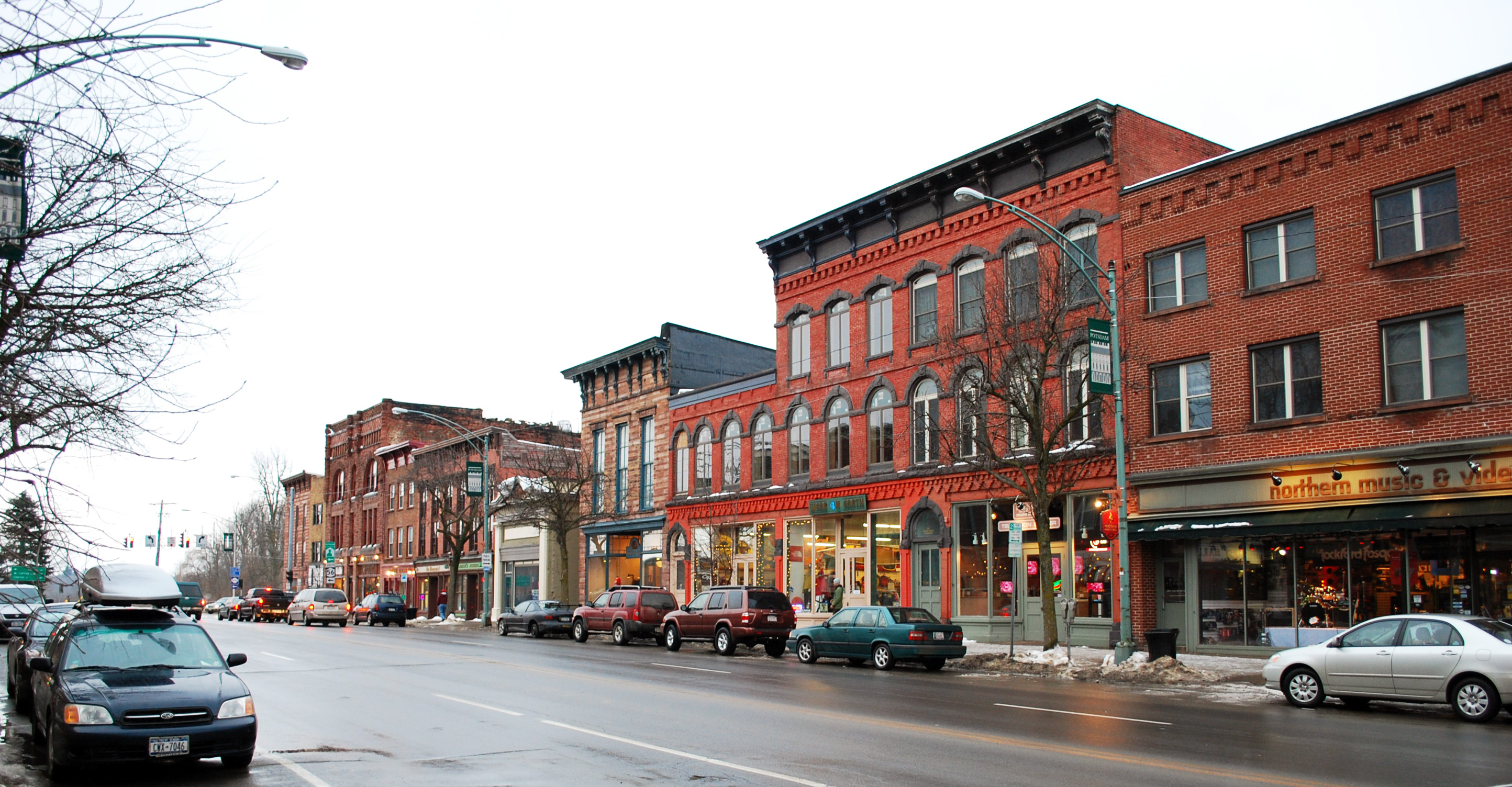
- Market Street in the village of Potsdam
- Motto: All Roads Lead to Potsdam
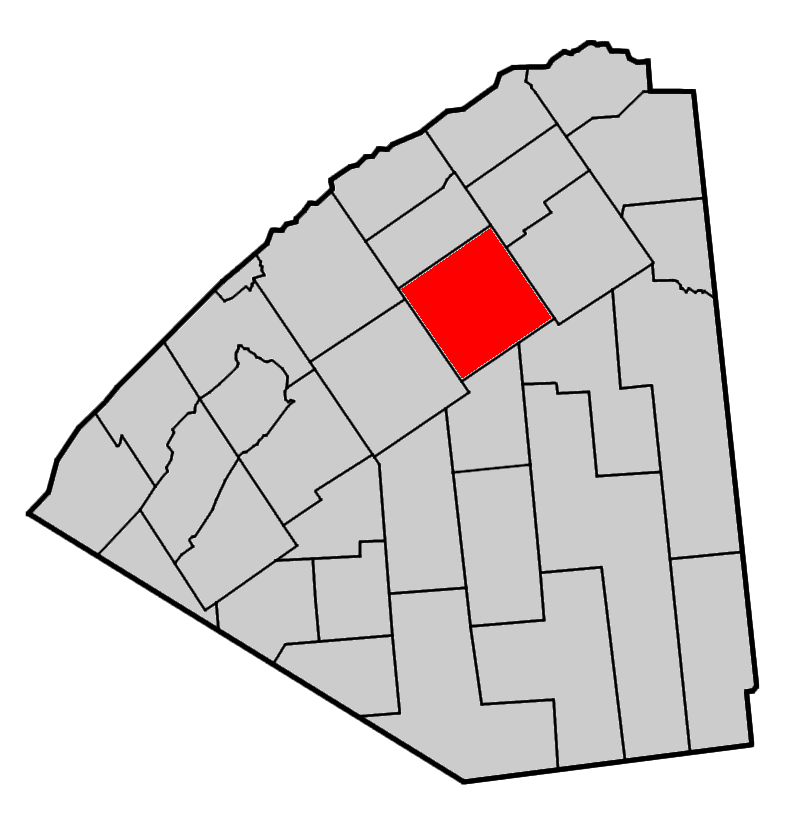
- Map highlighting Potsdam's location within St. Lawrence County.

- Location within the state of New York
- Coordinates: 44°40′15″N 74°59′3″W
- Country: United States
- State: New York
- County: St. Lawrence
- Named for: Potsdam, Germany

Government
  - Town Supervisor: Marty Miller

Area
  - Total: 103.4 sq mi (267.9 km^{2})
  - Land: 101.5 sq mi (262.8 km^{2})
  - Water: 2.0 sq mi (5.2 km^{2})
- Elevation: 433 ft (132 m)

Population (2020)
  - Total: 8,162
  - Density: 80.44/sq mi (31.06/km^{2})
- Time zone: UTC-5 (Eastern (EST))
  - Summer (DST): UTC-4 (EDT)
- ZIP code: 13676
- Area code: 315
- FIPS code: 36-59564
- GNIS feature ID: 0977239
- Website: Town website

Potsdam is a town in St. Lawrence County, New York, United States. The town population was 8,162 at the time of the 2020 census. When the State University of New York at Potsdam and Clarkson University are in session, the population increases by approximately 8,000 students. The town is named after the city of Potsdam in Germany.

The town of Potsdam also contains a village named Potsdam. Potsdam is centrally located within the county and northeast of Canton, the county seat.

== History ==
David Clarkson and Garret van Horn were early investors in the town, and settlement began around 1803. The newcomers found Native Americans residing in the town and in the fur trade.

The town was established in 1806 from part of the Town of Madrid. Potsdam is one of the original ten towns of St. Lawrence County.

The community of Potsdam set itself apart from the town in 1831 by incorporating as a village. The community of Raquetteville incorporated as the Village of Potsdam Junction (now Norwood) in 1871.

St. Lawrence Academy, the predecessor of the State University of New York at Potsdam was founded in 1816. In 1896, Clarkson University was founded.

The Potsdam area is well known for its reddish-orange Potsdam sandstone. A large slab of it is on display at the Smithsonian Institution in Washington, D.C.

The First Presbyterian Church of Dailey Ridge and French Family Farm are listed on the National Register of Historic Places.

== Geography ==
According to the United States Census Bureau, the town has an area of 103.4 square miles (267.9 km^{2}), of which 101.5 square miles (262.8 km^{2}) is land and 2.0 square miles (5.2 km^{2}) (1.92%) is water.

The Raquette River flows northward through the town's center. The Grasse River flows through the northwestern part of Potsdam.

=== Communities and locations in the Town of Potsdam ===
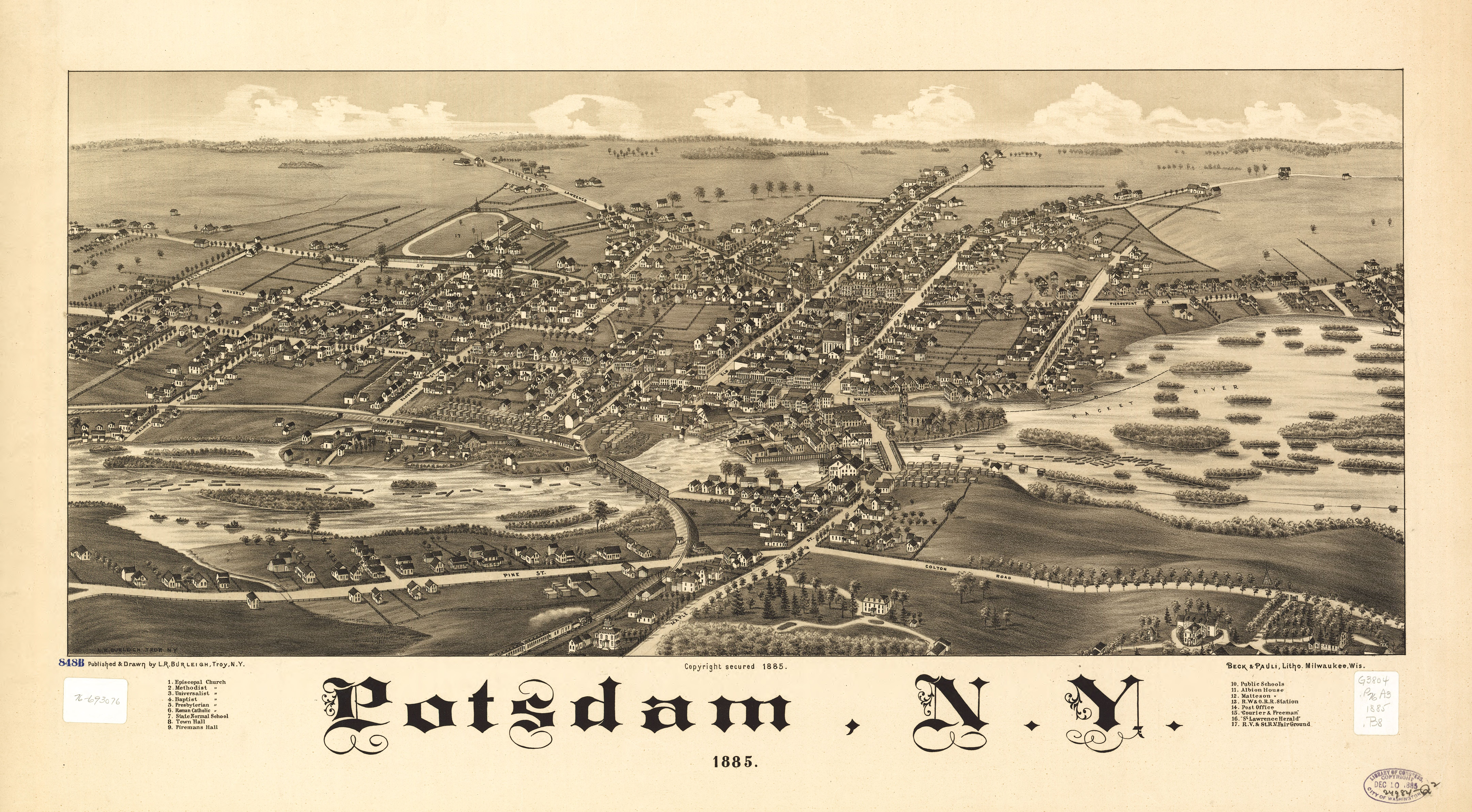
Perspective map of Potsdam with list of landmarks, L.R. Burleigh, 1885

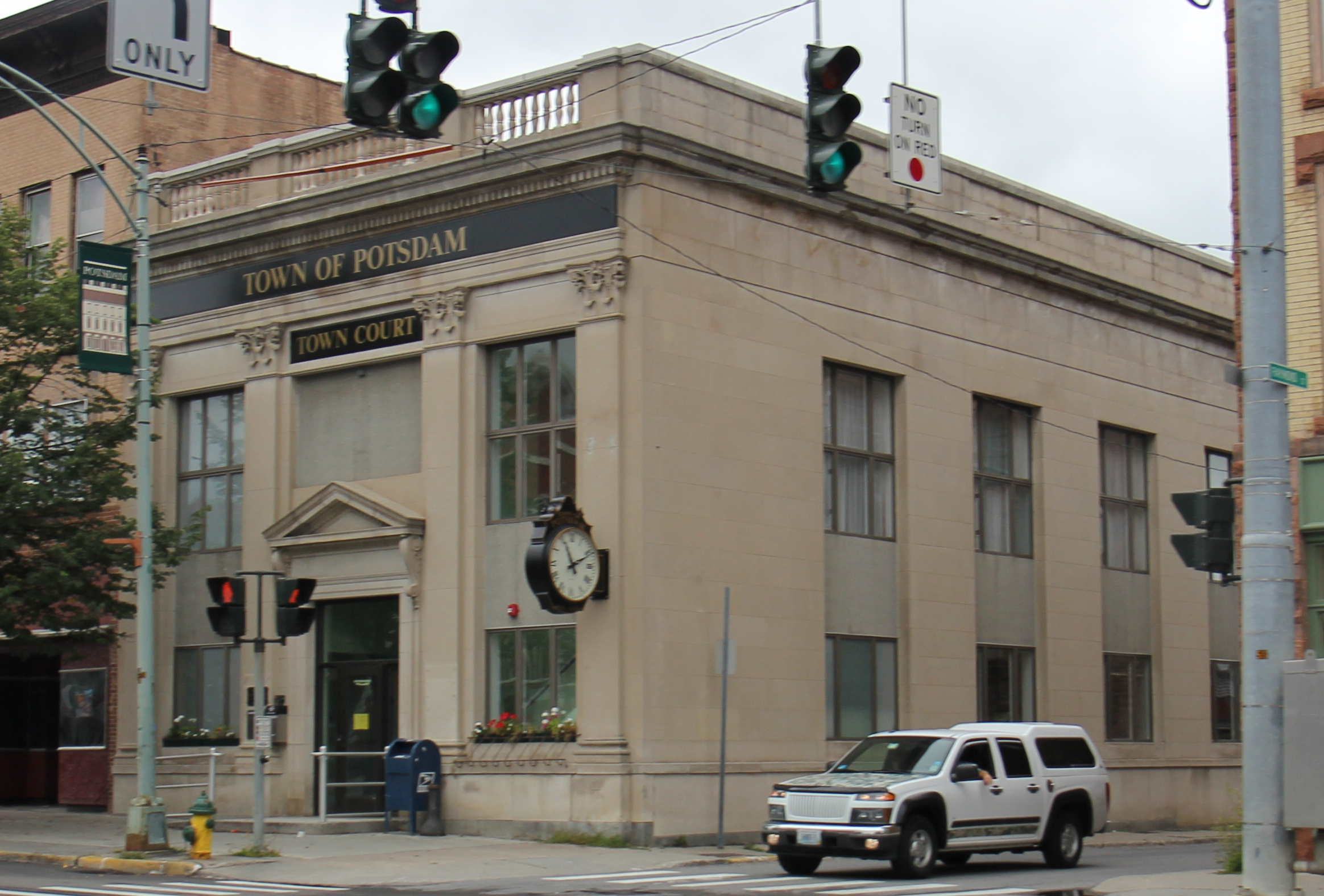
Town court for Potsdam

- Bucks Bridge − a hamlet in the northwestern corner of the town at the Grass River. The Buck's Bridge Community Church was listed on the National Register of Historic Places in 2004 as the Buck's Bridge United Methodist Church.
- Burnhams Corners − a location on NY-345 at County Road 35, northwest of Potsdam village.
- Casey Corners − a location on County Road 34 in the western part of the town.
- Clarkson University − a private university, southwest of Potsdam village.
- Crary Mills − a hamlet.
- Hewittville – a hamlet on the western bank of the Raquette River, north of Potsdam village.
- Norwood − southern part of the Village of Norwood is by the northern town line on NY-56; formerly called "Raquetteville" and "Potsdam Junction".
- Norwood Lake – reservoir southwest of Norwood.
- Potsdam − Village of Potsdam on the Raquette River.
- Potsdam Municipal Airport - Damon Field − small airport east of Potsdam village.
- Sissonville − a small hamlet on NY-56 north of Potsdam village.
- Slab City − a location on County Road 35 is in the western part of the town and south of West Potsdam. (see below)
- Stafford Corners − a location south of Potsdam village at the southeastern town line.
- SUNY Potsdam − a state college southeast of Potsdam village.
- Sugar Island − a location in the Raquette River, south of Potsdam village.
- Unionville − a hamlet north of Potsdam village on NY-56; site of one of the first cooperative settlements in New York. Membership included several relatives of Mormonism leader Joseph Smith, including his uncle John Smith.
- United Methodist Church, Potsdam, New York, ca. 1958
  West Potsdam − a hamlet on County Road 34 in the western part of the town, formerly known as "Smiths Corners", known for its gun shows. In 2022, the scheduled February show was cancelled due to the prior shooting death of a SUNY Potsdam student.

The location "Slab City" is referred to as a hamlet in the official New York State Gazetteer, maintained and published by the New York State Department of Health, which includes numerous defunct hamlets and towns, some with alternate or archaic spellings.

=== Climate ===
Climate data for Potsdam, New York
Month	Jan	Feb	Mar	Apr	May	Jun	Jul	Aug	Sep	Oct	Nov	Dec	Year
Record high °F (°C)	70 (21)	70 (21)	89 (32)	91 (33)	92 (33)	95 (35)	98 (37)	99 (37)	93 (34)	91 (33)	81 (27)	70 (21)	99 (37)
Mean daily maximum °F (°C)	26 (−3)	30 (−1)	39 (4)	53 (12)	66 (19)	75 (24)	79 (26)	77 (25)	70 (21)	57 (14)	45 (7)	32 (0)	54 (12)
Mean daily minimum °F (°C)	6 (−14)	8 (−13)	19 (−7)	33 (1)	44 (7)	54 (12)	59 (15)	56 (13)	48 (9)	37 (3)	28 (−2)	15 (−9)	34 (1)
Record low °F (°C)	−41 (−41)	−43 (−42)	−30 (−34)	−8 (−22)	21 (−6)	29 (−2)	35 (2)	28 (−2)	22 (−6)	5 (−15)	−9 (−23)	−37 (−38)	−43 (−42)
Average precipitation inches (mm)	2.12 (54)	1.89 (48)	2.15 (55)	2.93 (74)	3.17 (81)	3.45 (88)	3.74 (95)	3.75 (95)	4.26 (108)	4.11 (104)	3.30 (84)	2.54 (65)	37.41 (950)
Source: The Weather Channel

== Demographics ==
Historical population
Census	Pop.	Note	%±
1820	1,911		—
1830	3,650		91.0%
1840	4,473		22.5%
1850	5,349		19.6%
1860	6,737		25.9%
1870	7,774		15.4%
1880	7,610		−2.1%
1890	8,939		17.5%
1900	9,054		1.3%
1910	8,726		−3.6%
1920	8,794		0.8%
1930	8,880		1.0%
1940	9,609		8.2%
1950	12,437		29.4%
1960	14,045		12.9%
1970	16,700		18.9%
1980	17,911		7.3%
1990	16,822		−6.1%
2000	15,957		−5.1%
2010	16,041		0.5%
2020	14,901		−7.1%
U.S. Decennial Census

As of the census of 2020, there were 14,901 people and 4,988 households in the town. The population density was 158.2 inhabitants per square mile (61.1/km^{2}). The racial makeup of the town was 90.4% non-Hispanic White, 0.3% Black or African American, 0.6% Native American, 2.7% Asian, 0.1% Pacific Islander, 0.36% from other races, and 2.4% from two or more races. Hispanic or Latino of any race were 5.9% of the population.

There were 4,988 households, out of which 27.4% had children under the age of 18 living with them, 42.5% were married couples living together, 9.6% had a female householder with no husband present, and 44.6% were non-families. 31.8% of all households were made up of individuals, and 11.4% had someone living alone who was 65 years of age or older. The average household size was 2.17 and the average family size was 2.97.

In the town, the population was spread out, with 13.4% under the age of 18, 36.8% from 18 to 24, 19.9% from 25 to 44, 16.2% from 45 to 64, and 11.7% who were 65 years of age or older. The median age was 23 years. The town was 48.6% female and 51.4% male.

The median income for a household in the town was $37,977. The per capita income for the town was $23,747. About 19.3% of the population were below the poverty line.

== Education ==
The town of Potsdam consists of the Potsdam Central School District, which includes an elementary school (Lawrence Avenue), a middle school (A.A. Kingston), and a high school (Potsdam High School). The high school is the home of the Potsdam Sandstoners.

There are four universities in the area, including SUNY Potsdam (which is known for its Crane School of Music) and Clarkson University (a private research university known for engineering and business) in Potsdam, as well as both St. Lawrence University and SUNY Canton in nearby Canton. Due to the number of students in Potsdam during the academic year, Potsdam was ranked as #7 most ‘Collegiest College Town in America’ by the Washington Post.

== Media ==
=== Radio ===
- 1340 WMSA
- WRCD-FM 101.5 the Fox
- WSNN-FM 99.3
- WTSC-FM 91.1 the Source
- WVLF-FM Mix 96.1

=== Television ===
- WNPI-DT, a full-power WPBS-TV rebroadcaster in South Colton, primarily serves Ottawa.
- WWNY-CD, a low-power WWNY (CBS/Fox) retransmitter, is on WNPI's tower.

== Transportation ==
U.S. Route 11 and New York State Route 11B are east–west highways. New York State Route 56 is a north–south highway. New York State Route 345 is a northwest–southeast highway that intersects New York State Route 310 near the northwestern town line.

The New York Central Railroad's St. Lawrence Division runs through the town. Until 1964 the New York Central operated passenger trains from Massena, through the town, to Watertown, and to Syracuse to meet up with the NYC mainline.

== Notable people ==
- Frank B. Kellogg, 45th Secretary of State of the United States and Nobel Peace Prize laureate
- Gigolo Aunts, alternative rock band that formed in Potsdam during the mid-1980s.
- Lucinda Banister Chandler (1828-1911), social reformer and author
- Craig Conroy, professional hockey player (retired)
- Wes Craven, film director, educator and creator of the Nightmare on Elm Street and Scream series. Taught at Clarkson
- John Gerrish, music professor and American composer
- David A. Kyle, noted science fiction fan, author and publisher
- Trevor Scott, professional football player
- Jason Sutter, professional drummer, currently playing for Marilyn Manson
- Jeff Thacher, percussionist of the band Rockapella
- George A. Smith, early leader in the Latter Day Saint movement.
- John Lyman Smith, Utah Territorial Legislator
- Jason Liang, chess player
- Renée Fleming, Opera superstar, SUNY Potsdam's Crane School of Music, '81
- Abby Roque (born 1997), professional ice hockey forward for the Montreal Victoire
- Stephen H. Weed United States Military Academy Class of 1854. Career military officer in the U.S. Army. Killed July 2, 1863 at Gettysburg.

== Bibliography ==
- Curtis Gates, ed. (1894). Our County and Its People: A Memorial Record of St. Lawrence County, New York. Syracuse, NY: D. Mason and Company.
- "History and Pictures of Potsdam New York". Potsdam, NY 13676.
