= Knollwood (Star Lake, New York) =

- U.S. National Register of Historic Places
- Location within New York Location within the United States
- Location: S. end of Inlet Rd. at Oswegatchie R., Star Lake, New York
- Coordinates: 44°7′29″N 74°57′32″W
- Area: 26.9 acres (10.9 ha)
- Built: 1918-1923
- Built by: Dr. Frederick Calkins
- Architectural style: Adirondack Rustic
- NRHP reference No.: 11001006
- Added to NRHP: January 4, 2012

Knollwood is a medium-sized, historic Adirondack rustic style camp located on the Oswegatchie River in the Town of Fine, Saint Lawrence County, New York. It was constructed between 1918 and 1923. The main building is a two-story cross-gabled, 2,350-square-foot (218 m^{2}) building with elements of Stick and Bungalow style architecture. The camp also includes three additional outbuildings and a 103-foot (31 m) arched span suspension bridge.
