= Jonathan Wallace House =

Historic house in New York, United States

- U.S. National Register of Historic Places
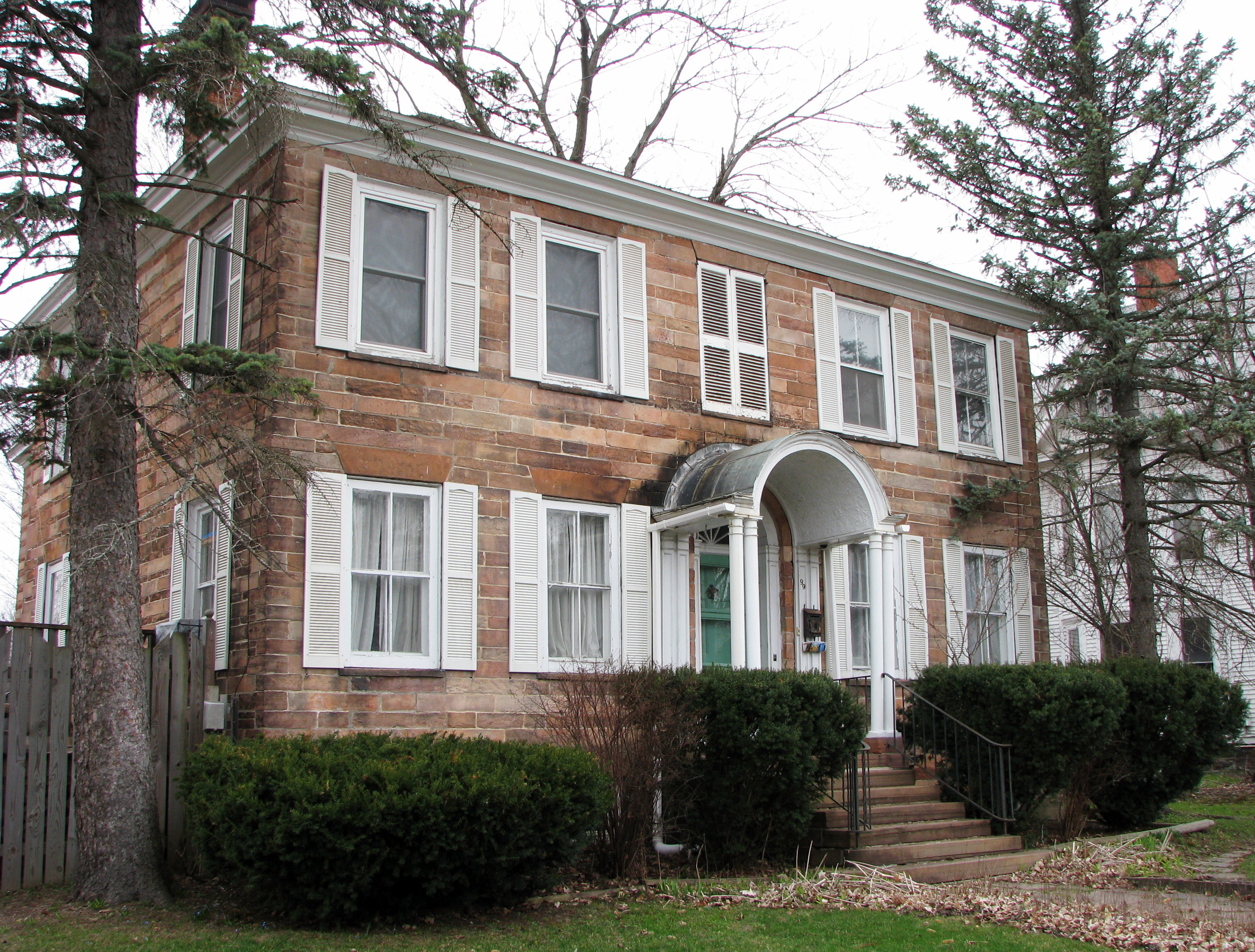
- Jonathan Wallace House

- Location within New York Location within the United States
- Interactive map showing the location of Jonathan Wallace House
- Location: 99 Market St. Potsdam, New York, U.S.
- Coordinates: 44°40′19″N 74°59′15″W
- Area: less than one acre
- Built: 1828
- Architectural style: Federal
- MPS: Red Potsdam Sandstone Resources Taken from Raquette River Quarries MPS
- NRHP reference No.: 03000028
- Added to NRHP: June 6, 2003

Jonathan Wallace House is a historic home located at Potsdam in St. Lawrence County, New York. It was built in 1828 and is a two-story, five-bay, hipped-roof Federal style residence with a two-story rear wing built about 1846. The main block and wing are constructed of red Potsdam Sandstone in the slab and binder style. It is currently a private residence.

It was listed on the National Register of Historic Places in 2003.
