= New York State Armory (Ogdensburg) =

- U.S. National Register of Historic Places
- Location within New York Location within the United States
- Location: 100 Lafayette St., Ogdensburg, New York
- Coordinates: 44.69061°N 75.4926°W
- Area: 1 acre (0.40 ha)
- Built: 1858
- Architect: White, Horatio Nelson
- Architectural style: Gothic Revival
- NRHP reference No.: 76002174
- Added to NRHP: December 12, 1976

New York State Armory , also known as "The Arsenal", is a historic National Guard armory building located at Ogdensburg in St. Lawrence County, New York. It is a rectangular, two story structure built of ransom ashlar block with central pavilions projecting on its north and south elevations. The main facade features a central pavilion with a tower rising above the roofline and terminating in a corbeled and crenellated parapet. It was designed by noted Syracuse architect Horatio Nelson White.

The building ceased being used by the State militia in 1873 and used by the city of Ogdensburg into the 1960s. It was listed on the National Register of Historic Places in 1976.

The Armory is still owned by NY state and is still occupied by the 2-108th Infantry Battalion, New York Army National Guard. The city of Ogdensburg does not have any responsibility or use of this building unless approved by NY state.
