= Canton, New York (disambiguation) =

Canton, New York, is the name of two places in St. Lawrence County, New York.

- Canton (town), New York
- Canton (village), New York, in the town
