= WREM =

Coordinates: 44.5337°N 75.0969°W

- Canton, New York; United States
- Frequency: 88.7 MHz
- Branding: Public Radio Remix

Programming
- Format: Public Radio
- Affiliations: Public Radio Exchange

Ownership
- Owner: St. Lawrence University

History
- Call sign meaning: Public Radio REMix

Technical information
- Licensing authority: FCC
- Class: A
- ERP: 2,600 watts
- HAAT: 71 meters

Links
- Public license information: Public file; LMS
- Website: Public Radio Remix

WREM is a 2,600-watt radio station licensed to Canton, New York. Owned and operated by St. Lawrence University, it broadcasts the public radio remix format.

== Station history ==
WREM was launched by St. Lawrence University in May 2011. St. Lawrence University also owns and operates North Country Public Radio, a National Public Radio affiliate which broadcasts on 89.5 FM in Canton, New York as well as many translators throughout Upstate New York and Vermont.

The call letters WREM were first used in 1956 when Ed Slusarczyk and Jerry Prouty built a 1 KW daytime station on 1480 kc in Remsen, NY.
