= North Country Now =

Newspaper

North Country Now is a local newspaper that is published weekly (Fridays) in Potsdam, St. Lawrence County, New York. It uses the names NCNow, North Country This Week and (on their website) North Country NOW.

Other newspapers pick up some of their stories; their reporting has been listed under group titles.

The local branch of National Public Radio, North Country Public Radio (NCPR), credited this (unrelated) newspaper with information that "State police are investigating a cross burning in the front yard of a home in Lisbon in St. Lawrence County." NCPR has sourced many other items to North Country Now.

== Advertisements ==
Regions of New York: #5: North Country

State University of New York at Canton uses ads in this newspaper (and two others) for faculty positions, as part of anti-bias diversification efforts.
