= Curt Stager =

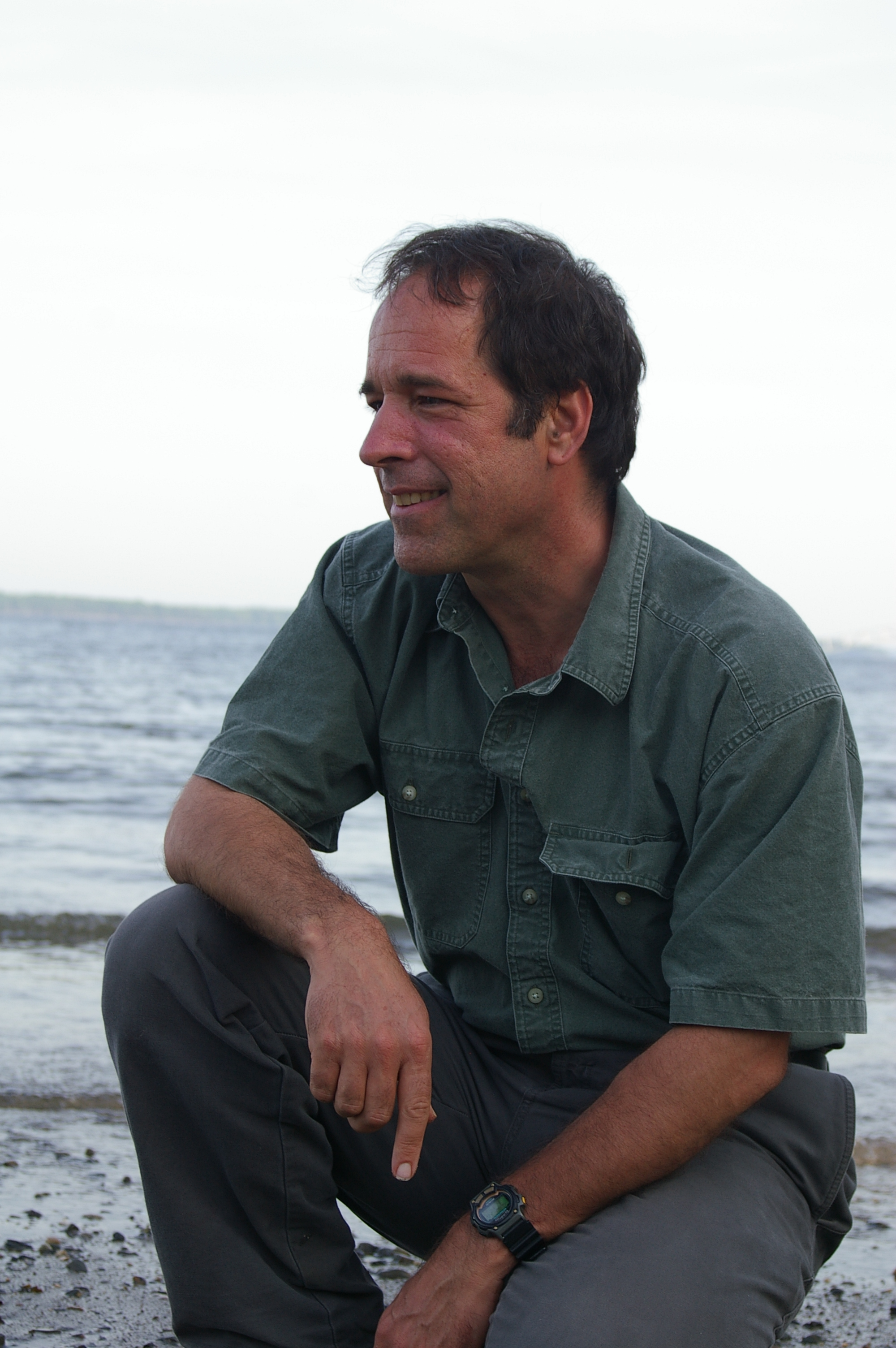
- Born: Jay Curtis Stager; July 29, 1956 (age 70); Lancaster, PA
- Education: Bowdoin College Duke University
- Occupations: Professor, author, musician, radio co-host
- Awards: Carnegie-Case Science Teacher of the Year, New York state Draper-Lussi Endowed Chair in Paleoecology and Lake Ecology

Jay Curtis Stager (born July 29, 1956) is an author, radio co-host, musician, and professor of natural sciences at Paul Smith's College in the Adirondack Mountains of upstate New York, where he holds the Draper-Lussi Endowed Chair in Lake Ecology and Paleoecology. He is also a research associate with the Climate Change Institute at the University of Maine, Orono.

== Education ==
He received a B.A. in biology and geology from Bowdoin College in 1979 and a Ph.D. in zoology and geology from Duke University in 1984.

== Academic career ==
His research in Africa and the Adirondacks has focused on the use of lake sediment cores to reconstruct past climates, evolution, and human impacts on ecosystems over centuries to thousands of years. In addition to investigating environmental histories of lakes in Africa, South America, and the United States, he has studied acid rain recovery in Adirondack lakes, human impacts on Thoreau's Walden Pond, fish evolution in Uganda, megadroughts in the Afro-Asian monsoon region, coral reef ecology in the Bahamas, and exploding lakes in Cameroon.

In 2013 he was named the Carnegie-CASE Science Professor of the Year for New York state. A reviewer for the fifth assessment report of the Intergovernmental Panel of Climate Change, he has published several dozen papers in Science, PNAS, and other journals, and has written for National Geographic Magazine, The New York Times, and other periodicals for general audiences.

== Public Outreach ==
His science-outreach efforts have also included a graphic novel about his student-centered research on Walden Pond, numerous public presentations on climate change and lake ecology, and a convention of Catholic Climate Ambassadors at Paul Smith's College in March, 2016.

Since 1990 he has co-hosted Natural Selections a weekly science program on North Country Public Radio.

A YouTube video of Curt playing guitar for a pet crow that appeared online in 2015 gained over 100k views on the site. He performs frequently on banjo and guitar, was director of Meadowlark Music Camp in Washington, ME, between 1997 and 2010, and co-organized the annual Science Art Music Festival at Paul Smith's College since 2014.

== Selected publications ==
- Silent Death From Cameroon's Killer Lake. National Geographic (September 1987).
- Field Notes from the Northern Forest, Syracuse University Press, 1997
- Stager, J.C., D.B. Ryves, B.M. Chase, and F.S.R. Pausata. Catastrophic drought in the Afro-Asian monsoon regions during Heinrich Event 1. Science 331: 1299-1302. (2011).
- Deep Future: The Next 100,000 Years of Life on Earth (Saint Martin's Press; 2011).
- Stager, J.C. and M. Thill. Climate Change in the Adirondacks: What Natural Resource Managers Can Expect and Do. (2010).
- Your Atomic Self: The Invisible Elements That Connect You to Everything Else in the Universe (Saint Martin's Press; 2014). - Commended Book for the AAAS/Subaru Prize for Excellence in Science Books
- Stager, J.C., L.A. Sporn, M. Johnson, and S. Regalado. Of paleo-genes and perch: What if an "alien" is actually a native? PLOS ONE, doi:10.1371/journal.pone.0119071. (2015)
- Tales of a Warmer Planet. New York Times (November 28, 2015).
- What The Muck of Walden Pond Tells Us About Our Planet. New York Times (January 7, 2017).
- Hidden Heritage. Adirondack Life (June 2017).
- Still Waters: The Secret World of Lakes (W.W. Norton; 2018).

== Videos ==
- "Deep Future." TEDx Perth, Australia, July 13, 2011.
- "Blackbird."
- "Climate Whiplash." Paul Smith's College presentation.
- "Hidden Heritage." Native Americans and environmental history in the Adirondacks.
- "The Age of Humans." The Wild Center, Tupper Lake, 2023-2025.
- "John Thomas Brook." TEDx Tupper Lake, Oct. 26, 2024. How our community renamed N-word Brook in honor of a fellow Adirondacker.
