= Richardson Hall, St. Lawrence University =

- U.S. National Register of Historic Places
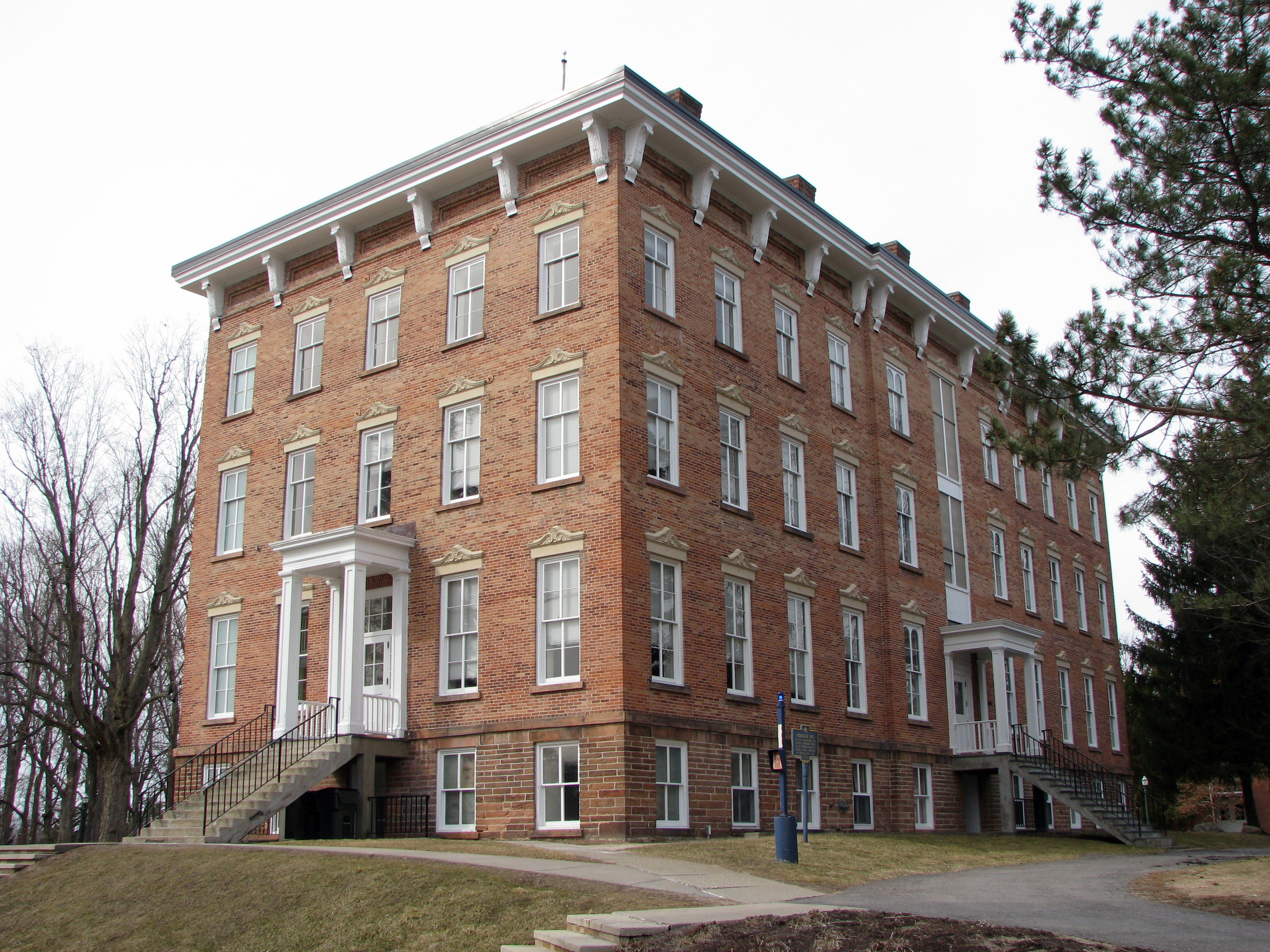

- Location within New York Location within the United States
- Location: St. Lawrence University campus, Canton, New York, U.S.
- Coordinates: 44°35′31″N 75°09′47″W
- Area: 1 acre (0.40 ha)
- Built: 1855
- NRHP reference No.: 74002204
- Added to NRHP: May 1, 1974

Richardson Hall, also known as College Building and Main Hall, is a historic institutional building at St. Lawrence University, Canton, in St. Lawrence County, New York. It is a three-story rectangular brick structure built on a high sandstone foundation. When constructed in 1855–1856, it housed the dining room, chapel, classrooms, and dormitory space. It was renovated in 1906 and 1962. It is located within the St. Lawrence University-Old Campus Historic District.

It was listed on the National Register of Historic Places in 1974.
