= Old Campus Historic District (St. Lawrence University) =

Historic district in New York, United States

- St. Lawrence University – Old Campus Historic District
- U.S. National Register of Historic Places
- U.S. Historic district
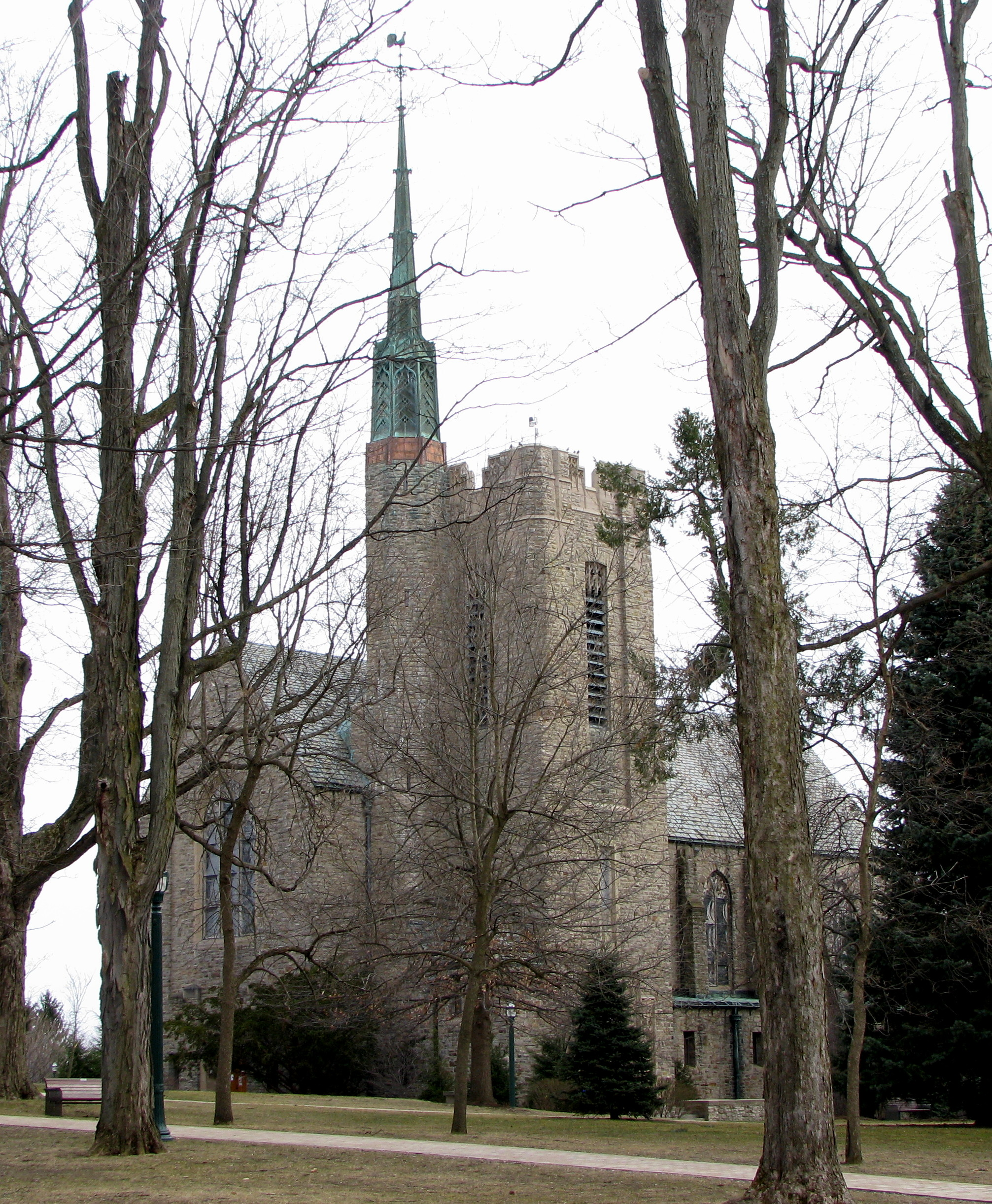
- Gunnison Memorial Chapel, St. Lawrence University

- Location within New York Location within the United States
- Location: Park St. Canton, New York, U.S.
- Coordinates: 44°35′26″N 75°9′50″W
- Area: 23 acres (9.3 ha)
- Built: 1856
- Architect: Multiple
- Architectural style: Late 19th And 20th Century Revivals, Classical Revival
- NRHP reference No.: 83001793
- Added to NRHP: September 15, 1983

The Old Campus Historic District is a national historic district on the campus of St. Lawrence University in Canton, New York, United States. The district includes eight contributing buildings and two contributing objects. It encompasses the structures built before 1930 and includes Beta Theta Pi Temple (1925–26), Gunnison Memorial Chapel (1925–26), Carnegie Hall (1905–06), Hepburn Hall (1925), Sykes Residence for Men (1930), Memorial Hall (1909), Piskor Hall (1907–09), Payson Hall (1910–11), and Dean-Eaton Residence Hall (1926–27). Also in the district are the separately listed Richardson Hall (1855–56) and Herring-Cole Hall (1869–1902).

It was listed on the National Register of Historic Places in 1983 as St. Lawrence University – Old Campus Historic District.
