= United States Post Office (Canton, New York) =

- US Post Office-Canton
- U.S. National Register of Historic Places
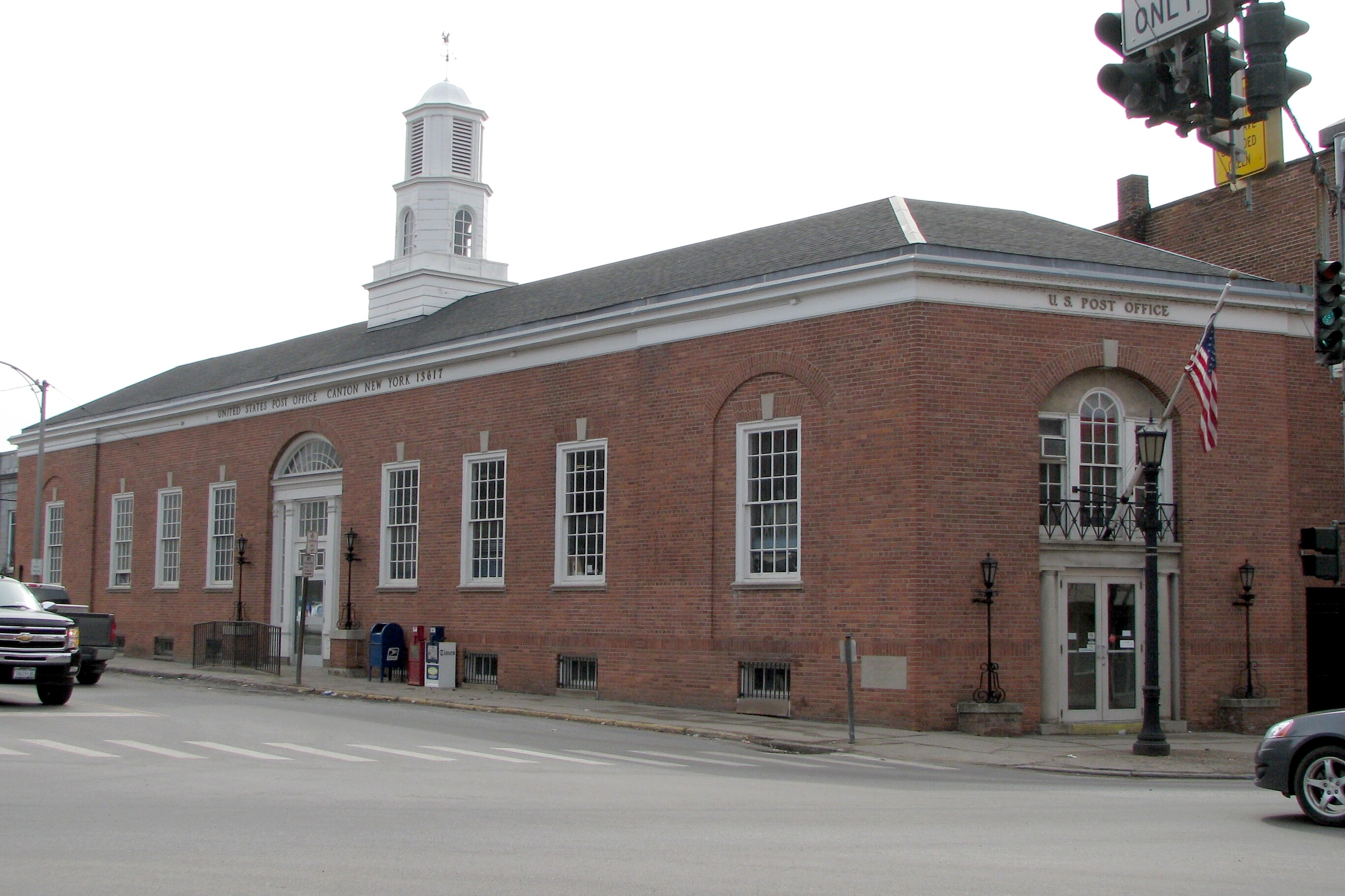

- Location within New York Location within the United States
- Interactive map showing the location for US Post Office, Canton, New York
- Location: 100 Main St., Canton, New York
- Coordinates: 44.5954°N 75.1692°W
- Area: less than one acre
- Built: 1936
- Architect: Louis A. Simon, Berta Margoulies, sculptor
- Architectural style: Colonial Revival
- MPS: US Post Offices in New York State, 1858-1943, TR
- NRHP reference No.: 88002469
- Added to NRHP: November 17, 1988

US Post Office-Canton is a historic post office building located at Canton in St. Lawrence County, New York. It was designed and built in 1936–37, and is one of a number of post offices in New York State designed by the Office of the Supervising Architect of the Treasury Department, Louis A. Simon. The building is in the Colonial Revival style and is a one-story, nine bay steel framed structure clad in red brick in a trapezoidal shape. It features a multi-tiered cupola on its low hip roof. The interior features a relief sculpture executed in 1939 by Berta Margoulies.

It was listed on the National Register of Historic Places in 1988.
