= Herring–Cole Hall, St. Lawrence University =

- Herring-Cole Hall, St. Lawrence University
- U.S. National Register of Historic Places
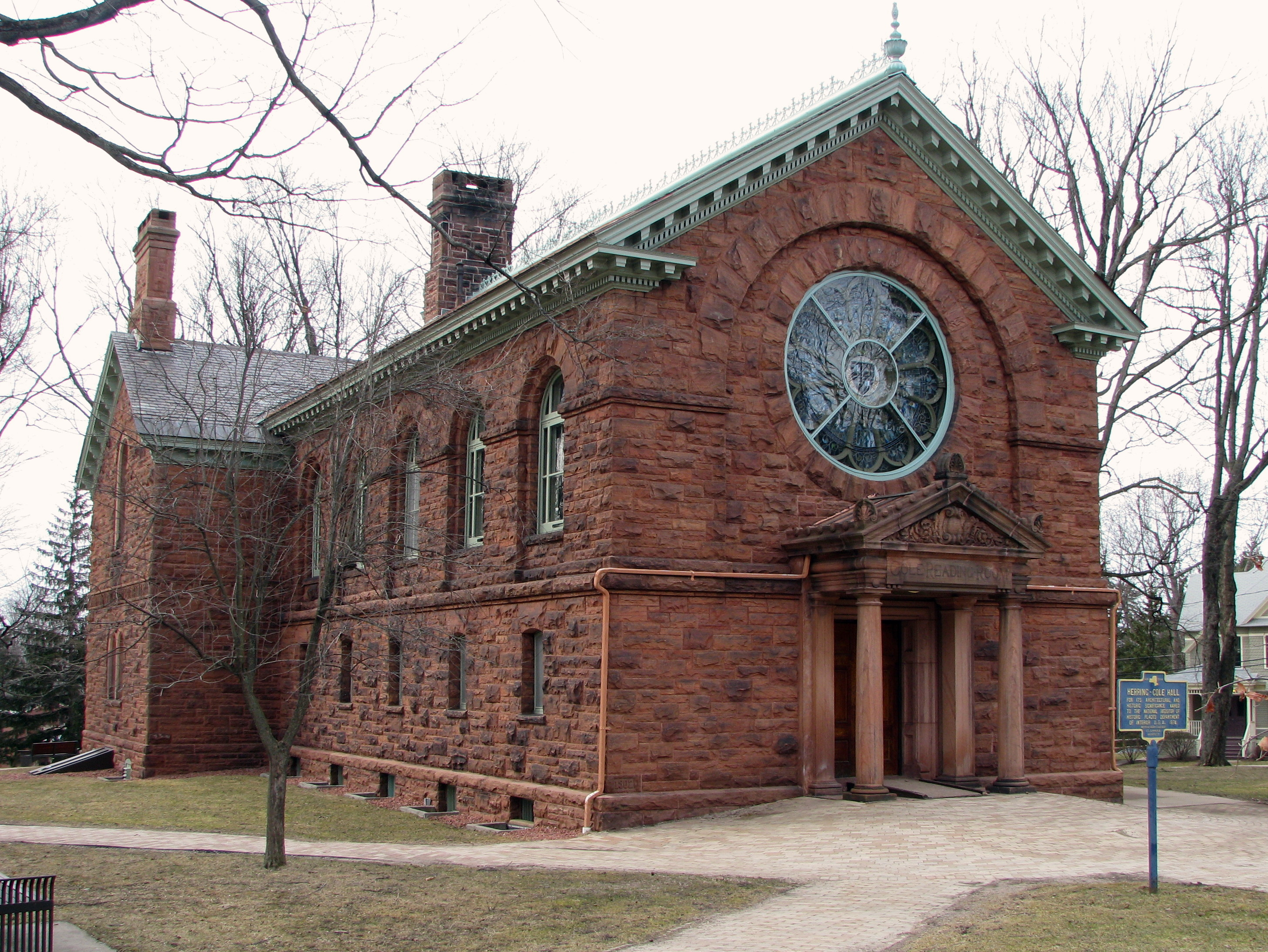

- Location within New York Location within the United States
- Location: St. Lawrence University campus, Canton, New York, U.S.
- Coordinates: 44°35′32″N 75°09′50″W
- Area: 1 acre (0.40 ha)
- Built: 1869
- Architect: Huberty & Hudswell
- Architectural style: Italianate
- NRHP reference No.: 74002203
- Added to NRHP: May 1, 1974

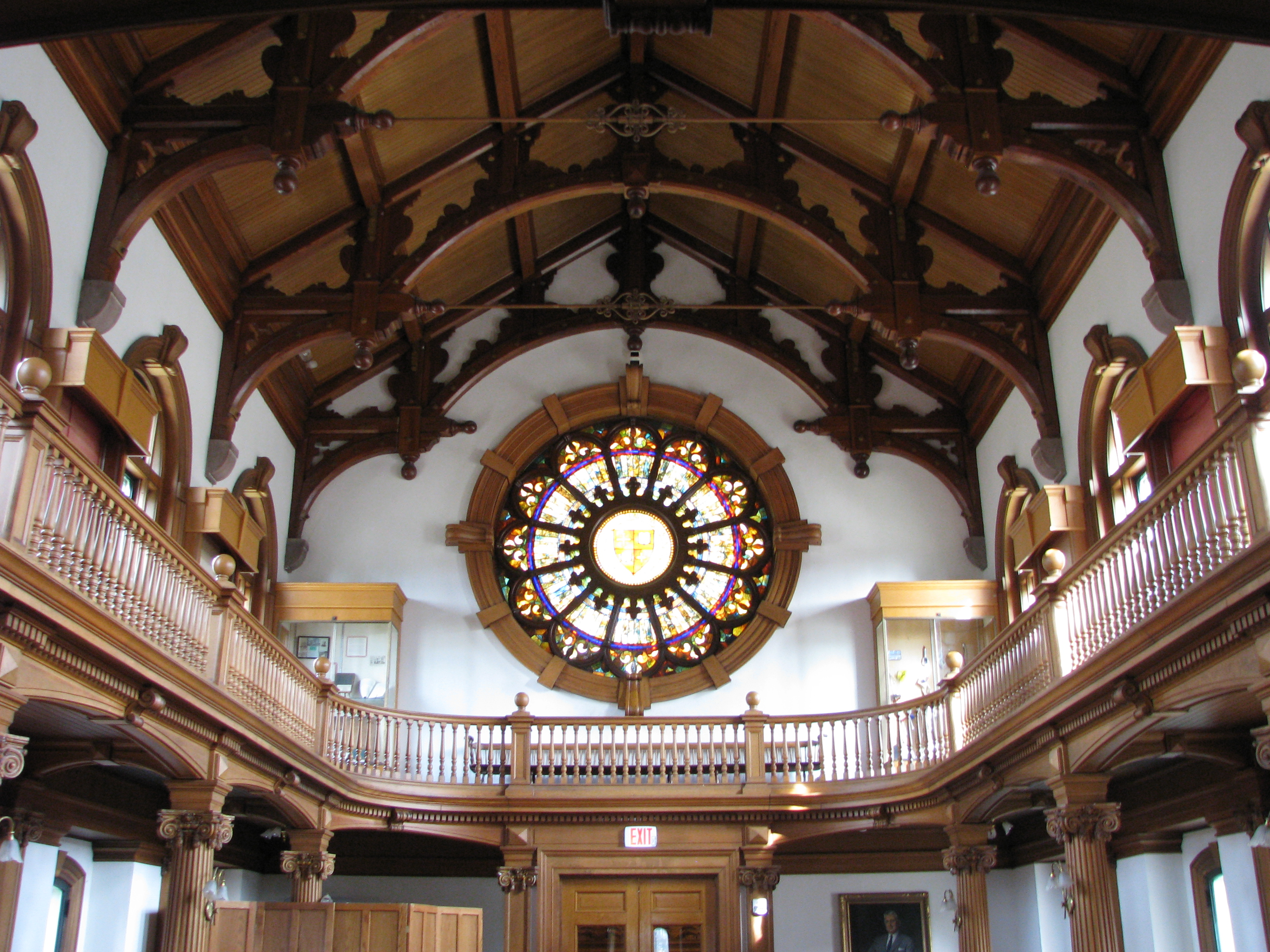
Interior of the Cole Reading Room, Herring–Cole Hall

Herring–Cole Hall is a historic institutional building located at St. Lawrence University in Canton, St. Lawrence County, New York. It is a 1 1/2-story structure built of Potsdam sandstone. It was built in two stages and its T-shaped plan is due to the attachment of the Cole Reading Room (1902) at a right angle to the Herring Library (1869). It is located within the St. Lawrence University – Old Campus Historic District.

Popular campus lore maintains that the building is haunted by one or more spirits or ghosts. The building plays host to the occasional séance for this reason, and is a favorite location for local meditation circles, though this stems from its acoustics, lighting, age, atmosphere, and isolation.

It was listed on the National Register of Historic Places in 1974.
