= Village Park Historic District =

Historic district in New York, United States

- U.S. National Register of Historic Places
- U.S. Historic district
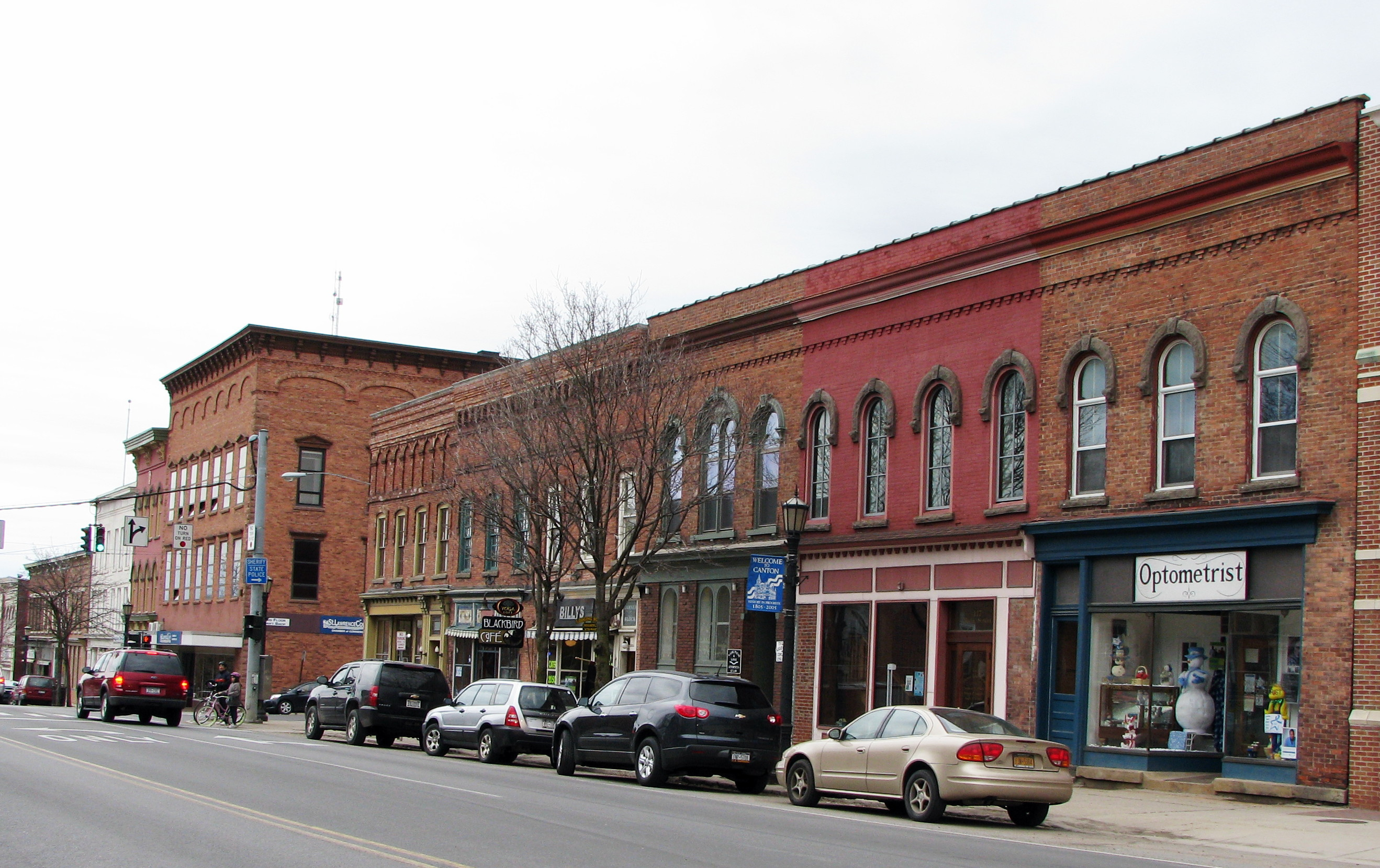
- Main Street, Canton

- Location within New York Location within the United States
- Location: Both sides of Main and Park Sts., and Park Pl. (original); 7-100 Main St. N, and 70, 76, 80, 90, Main St. S (increase); 7-1/2, 9 & 11 E. Main St. (increase II); Canton, New York
- Coordinates: 44°35′43″N 75°10′6″W
- Built: 1834
- Architect: Multiple
- Architectural style: Colonial Revival, Classical Revival, Romanesque (original); Italianate (increase) ___ (increase II)
- NRHP reference No.: 75002087 (original); 83001794 (increase); 08000108 (increase II)
- Added to NRHP: May 06, 1975 (original); September 29, 1983 (increase); February 29, 2008 (increase II)

Village Park Historic District is a historic district in Canton, New York.

It was listed on the National Register of Historic Places in 1975, and its boundaries were twice increased, in 1983 and in 2008.
