= St. Lawrence University =

Private college in Canton, New York, US

Coordinates: 44°35′34″N 75°9′37″W

- Motto: Fides et Veritas (Latin)
- Motto in English: Faith and Truth
- Type: Private liberal arts college
- Established: 1856; 170 years ago
- Academic affiliations: NAICU; CLAC; Annapolis Group; CIC
- Endowment: $416.8 million (2024)
- President: Kathryn A. Morris
- Faculty: 175 full-time
- Undergraduates: 2,089
- Postgraduates: 79
- Location: Canton, New York, U.S.
- Campus: 1,000 acres (400 ha); Rural
- Colors: Scarlet and brown
- Nickname: Saints
- Sporting affiliations: NCAA; EISA; Div I – ECAC Hockey; Div III – Liberty League
- Website: stlawu.edu
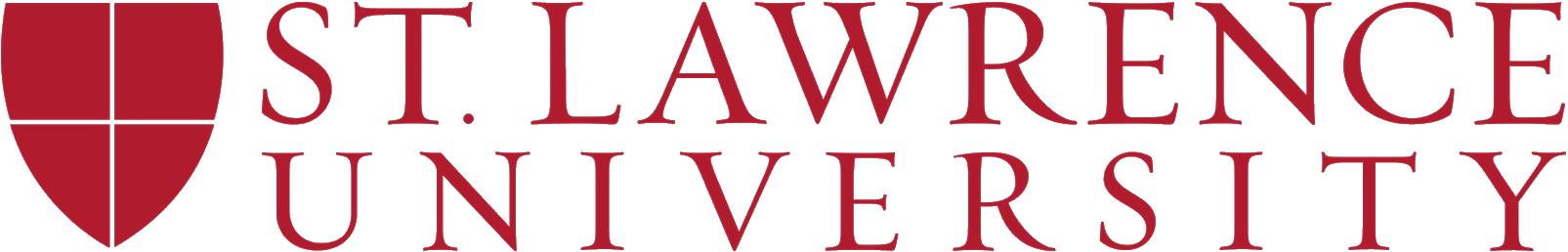

St. Lawrence University (SLU) is a private liberal arts college in Canton, New York, United States. It has roughly 2,100 undergraduate and 100 graduate students.

Though St. Lawrence today is nonsectarian, it was founded in 1856 by leaders of the Universalist Church, who were seeking to establish a seminary west of New England and were enthusiastically courted by the citizens of Canton. The church almost did not place the school in Canton, however, as they felt students might be exposed to too much "excitement" within the village limits in 1856. The denomination, which has since merged with the Unitarian faith, was part of the liberal wing of Protestantism, championing such ideas as critical thinking and sex equality — attributes that surfaced in the new Theological School of St. Lawrence University, which was progressive in its teaching philosophy and coeducational from the beginning.

== History ==
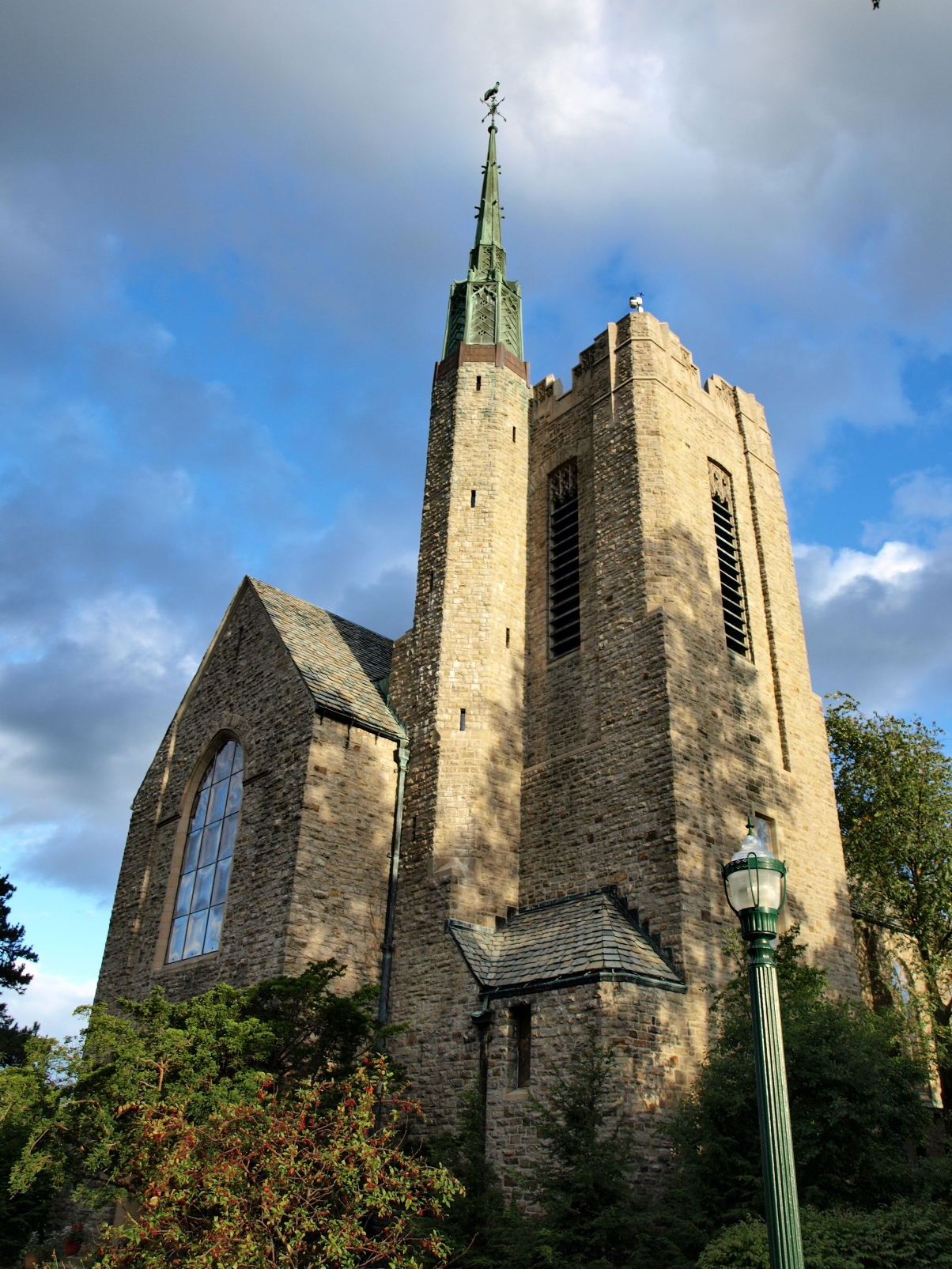
Gunnison Memorial Chapel

The university as it exists today was created as a "Preparatory Department" to provide a foundation for theological study. That department became today's liberal arts university, while the seminary closed in 1965 with the Unitarian/Universalist consolidation.

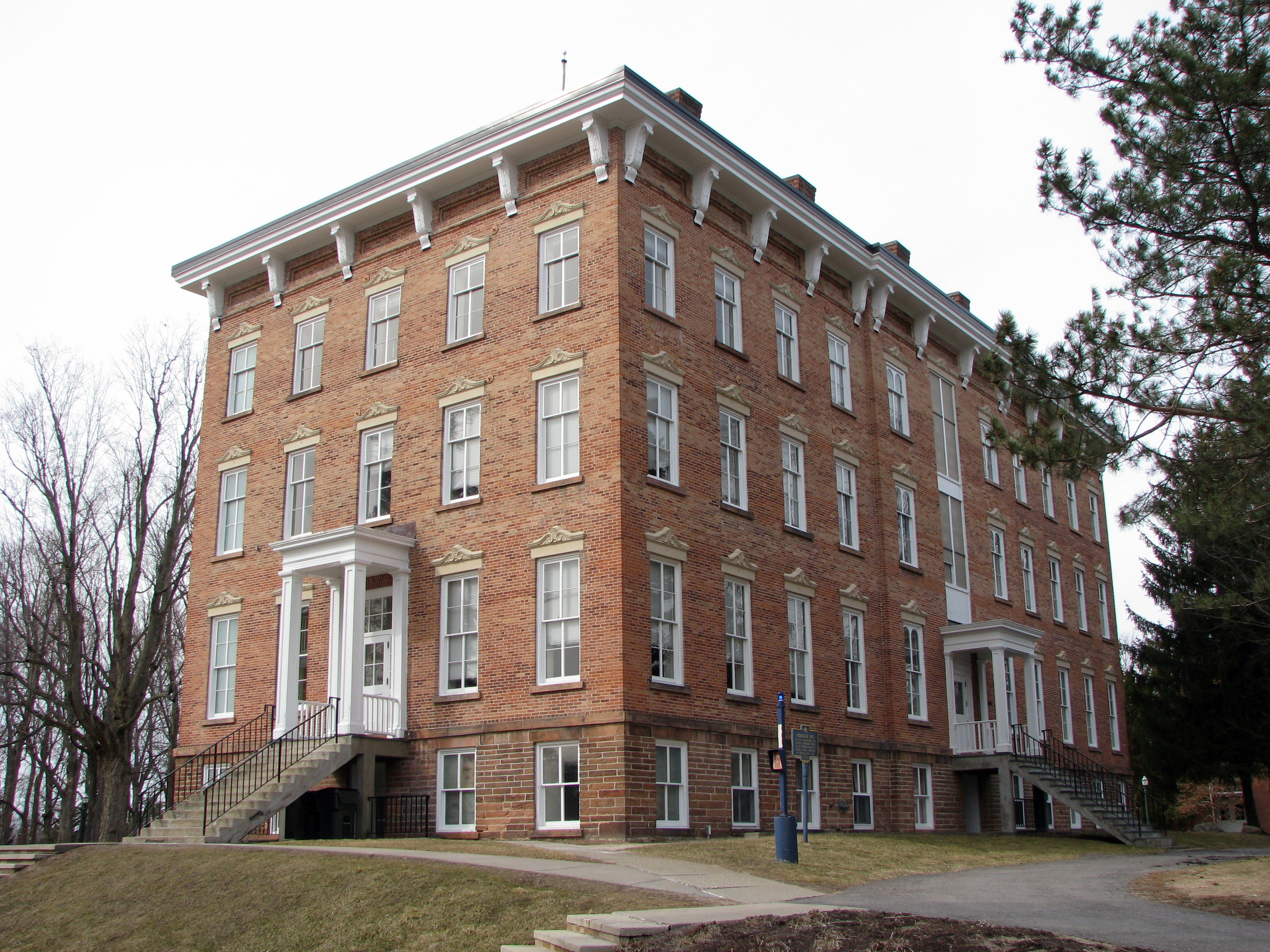
Richardson Hall

Early in the 20th century, the university's graduate program in education came into being; it has since served hundreds of North Country school teachers and administrators. Following a difficult period during the Great Depression and World War II that included the decision to shut down the Brooklyn Law School, the student population increased quickly, and with it, the physical plant. A four-building campus serving around 300 students in the early 1940s, became a 30-building campus serving 2000 students within 25 years, partly through acquisition of the adjacent state school of agriculture campus when that facility relocated across town. The mid-1960s, also saw the birth of one of St. Lawrence's nationally known programs: its international programs. In 1974, two early campus buildings, Richardson Hall (1855–56), and Herring-Cole Hall (1869–1902), were listed on the National Register of Historic Places. In 1984, structures built before 1930 were listed on the National Register of Historic Places as St. Lawrence University-Old Campus Historic District.

During World War II, St. Lawrence University was one of 131 colleges and universities nationally that took part in the V-12 Navy College Training Program which offered students a path to a Navy commission.

In the 2000s, the university undertook several construction projects. The Newell Field House was completed in 2001. The campus student center was completed in the spring of 2004, and serves as the school's hub at the center of campus. The Johnson Hall of Science opened in the fall of 2007, and expanded learning and lab space in several science disciplines, notably biology, chemistry, biochemistry, neuroscience, and psychology. Johnson Hall received LEED Gold certification for its sustainable design; it was the first Gold science building in New York State. Additionally, the Noble Center underwent major renovations to double the space available for the arts. A new Center for Arts Technology opened in January 2007. In 2020, the university completed an extensive renovation of the Appleton Arena.

== Undergraduate admissions ==
In 2024, St. Lawrence accepted 63.5% of undergraduate applicants, with admission standards considered very high, applicant competition considered average, and with those admitted having an average 3.6 high school GPA. The college does not require submission of standardized test scores, St. Lawrence being a test optional school. Those accepted that submitted test scores had an average 1330 SAT score (19% submitting scores) or average 30 ACT score (5% submitting scores).

For the class of 2022 (enrolled fall 2018), St. Lawrence received 6,458 applications and accepted 2,975 (46.1%). The number enrolling was 643; the yield rate (the percentage of accepted students who enroll) was 21.6%. In terms of class rank, 36% of enrolled freshmen were in the top 10% of their high school classes; 73% ranked in the top quarter. The average GPA for entering freshmen was 3.55, the average SAT score was 1260, and the average ACT score was 28.

The class of 2018 (enrolled fall 2014) included 34.2% from New York State, 56.2% from 31 other states, and 9% international students representing 63 countries. Of the 643 matriculants in 2018, 52% were female, 48% were male.

== Academics ==
Academic rankings

Liberal arts
- U.S. News & World Report: 54
- Washington Monthly: 98

National
- Forbes: 158
- WSJ/College Pulse: 187

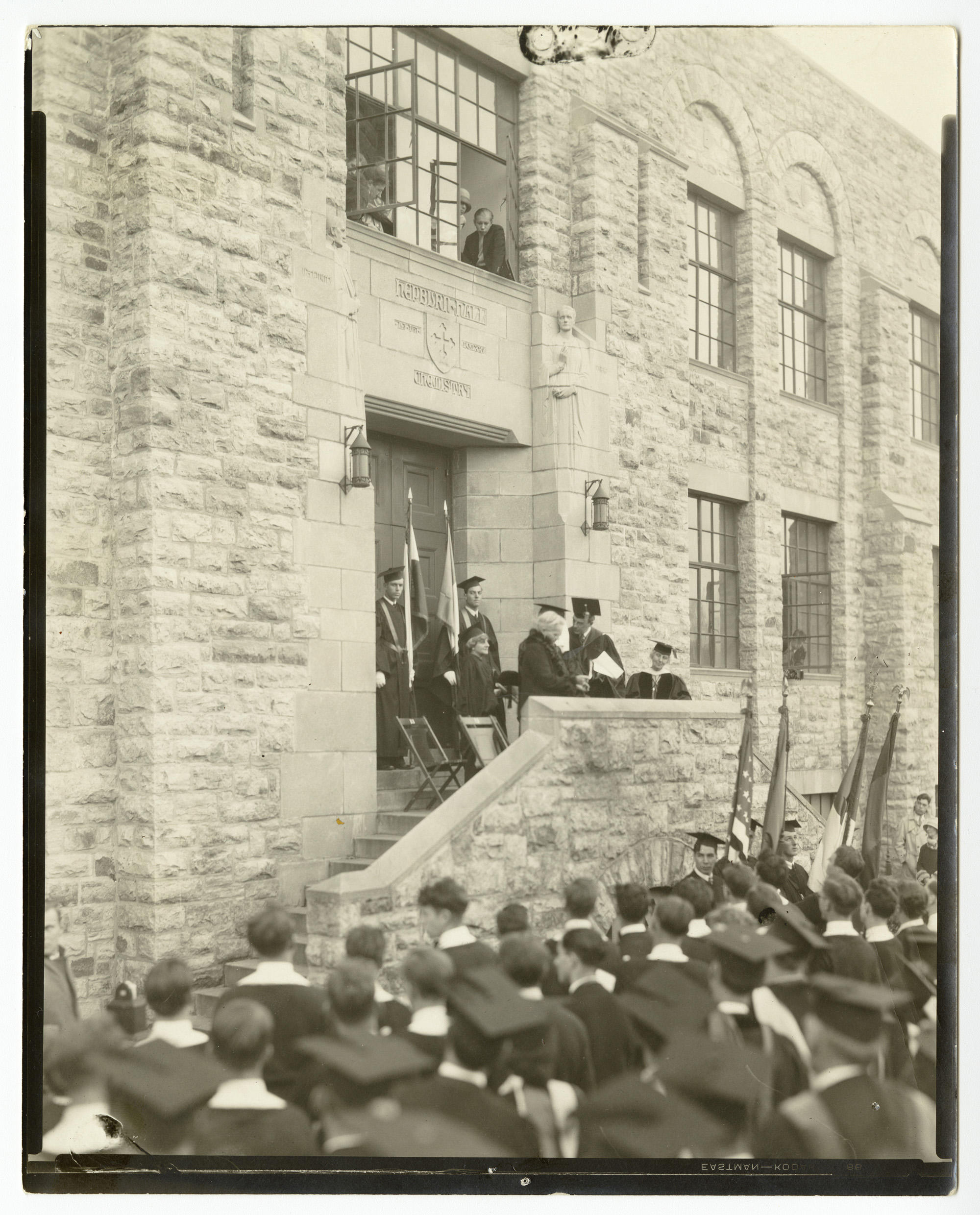
Marie Curie dedicates Hepburn Hall of Chemistry

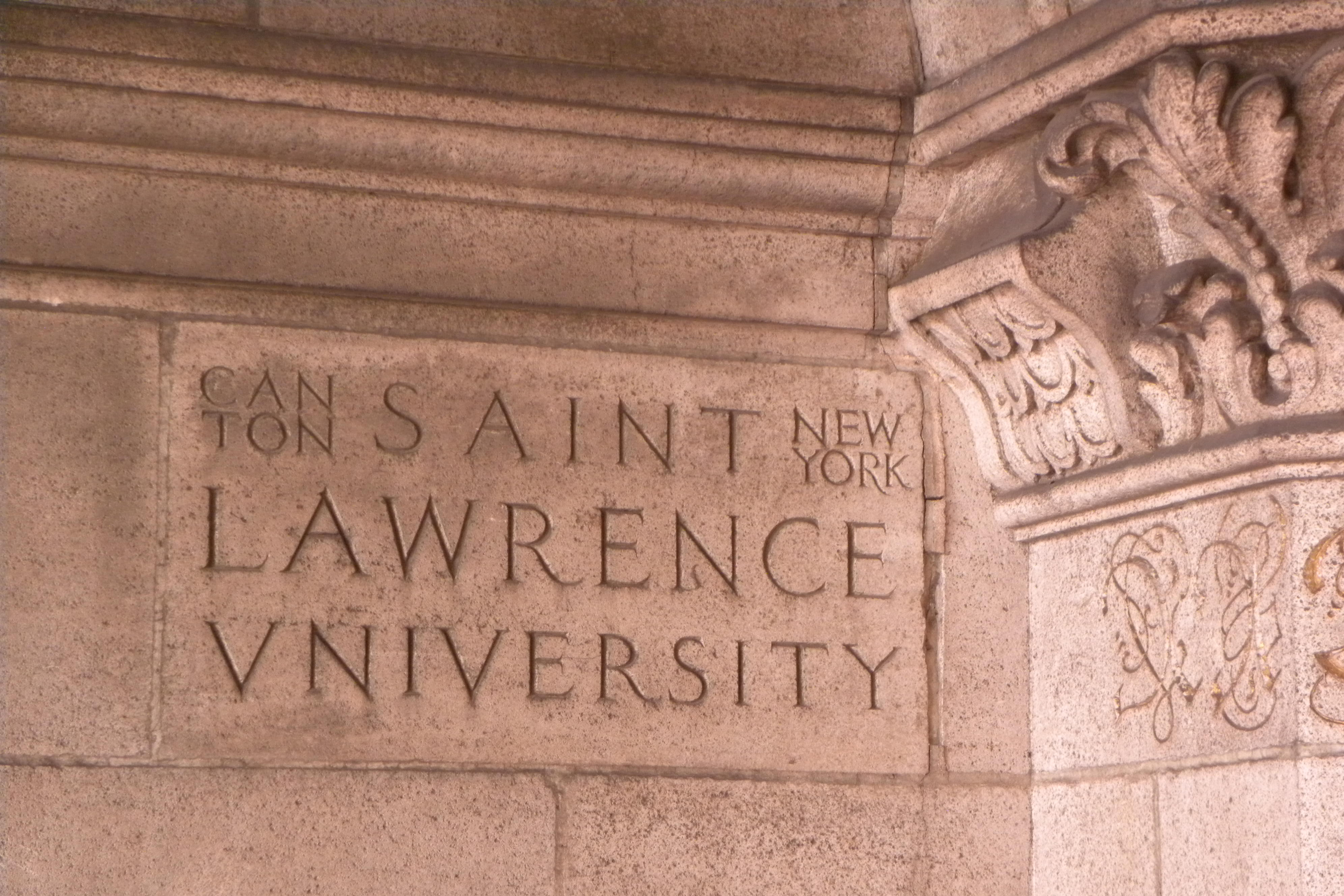
Engraved stone, facade of the Louvain (Belgium) university library. Commemorates the financial support received from St. Lawrence University (among many others) to rebuild the library after its destruction by fire in 1914.

=== Majors and programs ===
In total there are 40 majors available and 36 minors. St. Lawrence has 3+2 engineering programs run jointly with five other colleges, and a 4+1 MBA at Clarkson University. Students are also free to take classes at nearby Clarkson University, SUNY Potsdam, and SUNY Canton. Its most popular undergraduate majors, based on 2021 graduates, were:

- Economics (68)
- Psychology (66)
- Political Science & Government (46)
- Biology/Biological Sciences (41)
- Social Sciences (35)
- Speech Communication & Rhetoric (29)
- English Language & Literature (25)

=== International studies ===
St. Lawrence offers international programs in Australia, Austria, Canada, China, Costa Rica, Czech Republic, Denmark, England, France, Germany, India, Italy, Japan, Kenya, Nepal, New Zealand, Spain, Sweden, Thailand, and Trinidad and Tobago. In addition, the International Student Exchange Program (ISEP) allows students to study at any of over 100 universities on six continents. In the U.S., students can study at The Washington Center in Washington, D.C., in New York City, in the Adirondack State Park, or at Fisk University, a distinguished, historically Black university in Nashville, Tennessee.

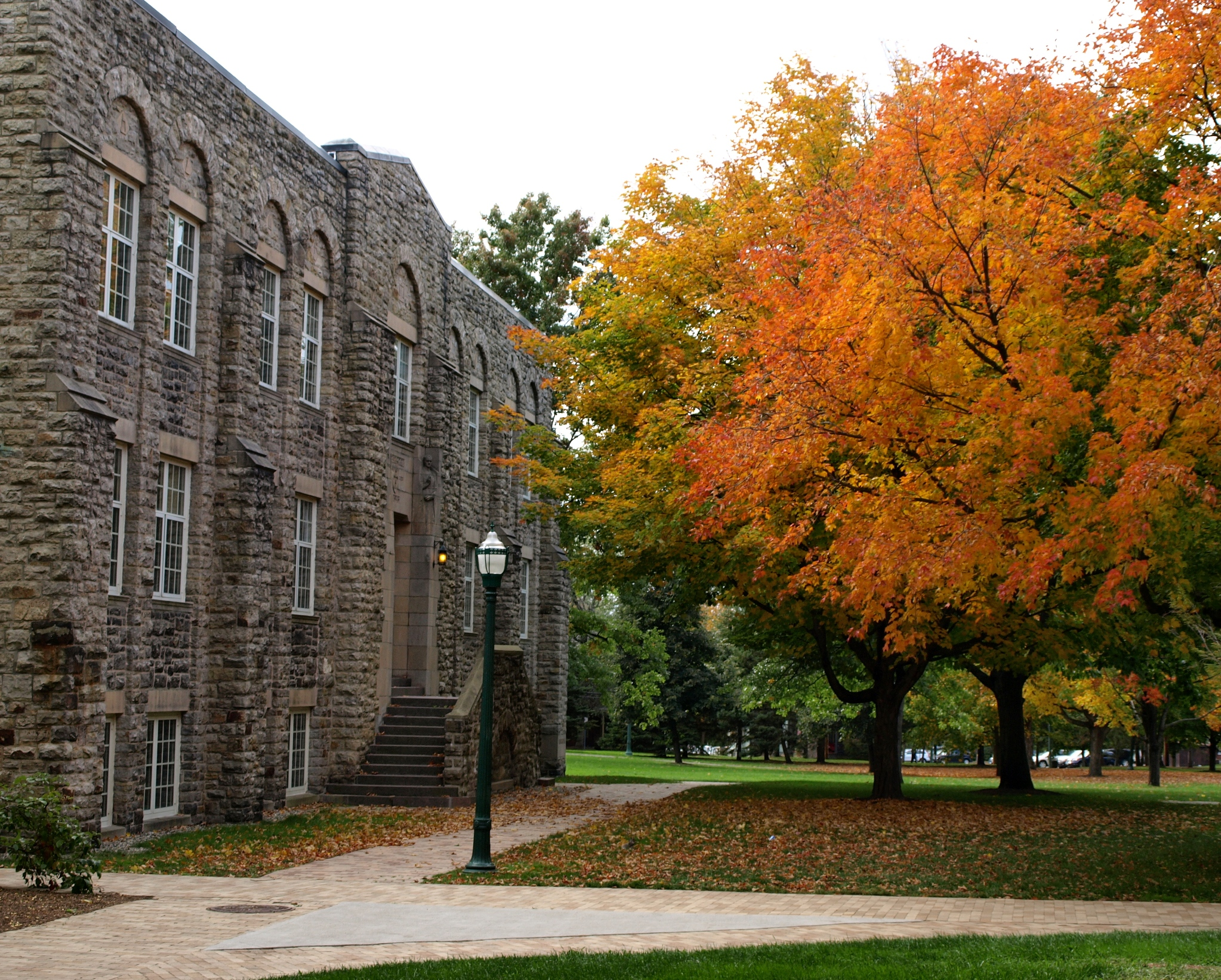
Hepburn Hall

== Libraries ==
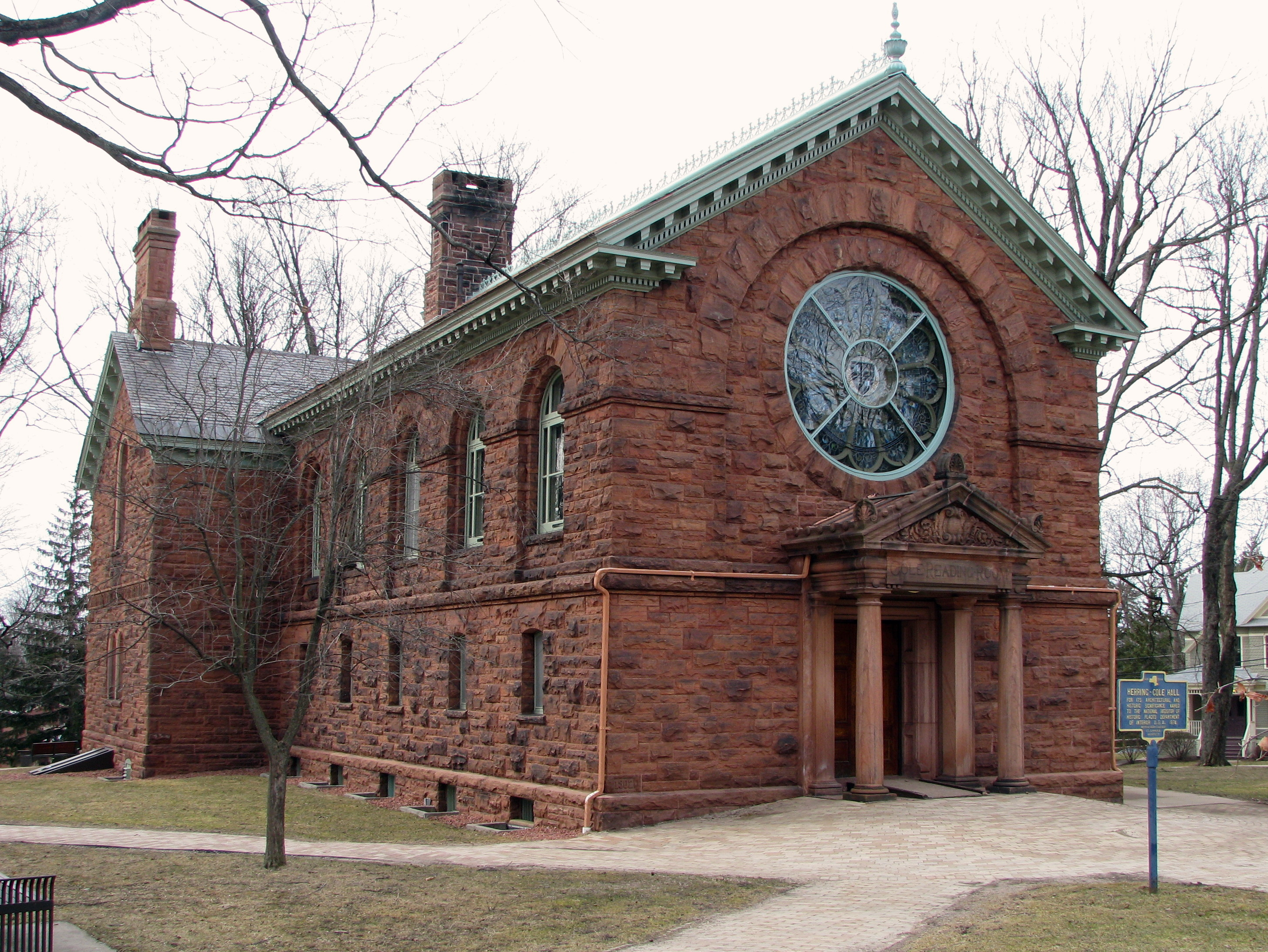
Herring-Cole Hall, the university's earliest library

The Owen D. Young Library (ODY) is a 96,000 square feet (8,900 m^{2}) multilevel building. A six-million-dollar renovation of the library was recently completed. It includes more than 500,000 volumes, over 370,000 government documents, 1986 periodicals, 550,000 micro text units, recipient of 10,000 to 20,000 reports and documents annually and access to over 70 databases through Internet.

In addition to ODY, which houses the college's major collections in the social sciences and humanities, the J. Harold and Ruth C. Launders Science Library opened in January 1994. Home of the major science and technology collections at St. Lawrence, the Launders Science Library occupied the upper two floors of Madill Hall, and tripled the space available for science resources and services. In early 2025, a fire in the lower floor of Fox Hall resulted in the closure of the Launders Library and the relocation of its materials to the ODY Library.

The library's collection of primary scholarly resources may be viewed and used in the Frank and Anne Piskor Special Collections Reading Room, located directly across the atrium from the main entrance of ODY. Each semester the teaching librarians offer instruction to classes from a variety of academic departments and programs, including fine arts, French, English, history, environmental studies, economics and the outdoor studies program. In addition, the special collections program includes a book arts collection and a laboratory press. Highlights of St. Lawrence's special collections include the William Rose Benet Collection of American Poetry, the Milburn Collection of Hawthorniana, the Edwin Arlington Robinson Collection, and the Frank P. Piskor Collection on Robert Frost. Other special collections include manuscripts devoted to Frederic Remington, the Adirondacks, the St. Lawrence Seaway and other aspects of northern New York history.

== Student life ==
=== Arts and cultural offerings ===
The opportunities described below are augmented by frequent concerts, exhibits, performances and shows provided by outside performers.

==== Music ====
The music department supports three vocal and two instrumental ensembles. Laurentian Singers, an undergraduate chorus that tours each spring, University Chorus and the Early Music Singers provide vocal opportunities for St. Lawrence students. Instrumentalists may choose between participation in the String Orchestra, Concert Band, Improv Lab, Early Music Ensemble and Special Productions. The Early Music Ensemble uses the Emily Romer Collection of medieval and Renaissance instruments to perform music of the 12th through 18th centuries. Each semester the department offers a Special Production, focusing on a particular repertory. Recent productions have included a Latin Dance Party, Music for Louis XIV and Traditional Irish Music. Private instruction is available in voice and on keyboard, guitar, brass, woodwinds and strings. Three informal student-directed collegiate a cappella groups, The Saints, The Sinners, and The Upbeats are active both on and off campus. Most students that participate in the Music Ensembles are not Music Majors, but rather have a strong interest in pursuing their musical capabilities.

St. Lawrence University is also home to the Java Barn, an on-campus music venue run by a dedicated group of SLU students. The Java Barn hosts live bands every weekend; shows are open to all SLU students and admission is free.

==== Theatre ====
The Performance and Communication Arts (PCA) department stages annual faculty-directed productions in Gulick Theater, a proscenium theater seating 511. In addition, the flexible 85- to 100-seat Edison Miles Theater (better known as the Black Box) is used for experimental and student productions. Guest artist workshops that address all aspects of theater are offered for interested students. Though some production work is associated with classes, for many productions it is not necessary to be a major, or even currently enrolled in (PCA) classes, to participate.

==== Art ====
The university art collection contains nearly 7,000 objects that are frequently displayed in the Richard F. Brush Art Gallery or used for tours and classroom discussions. While the collection dates to the university's founding, its most vital growth has taken place in recent years. Twentieth-century works on paper, such as photographs, prints, drawings and portfolios, are the strength of the collection. Paintings and sculptures by Frank Stella, George Segal, Louise Nevelson, Isamu Noguchi, Milton Avery and Frederic Remington are among the collection's highlights.

=== Activities ===
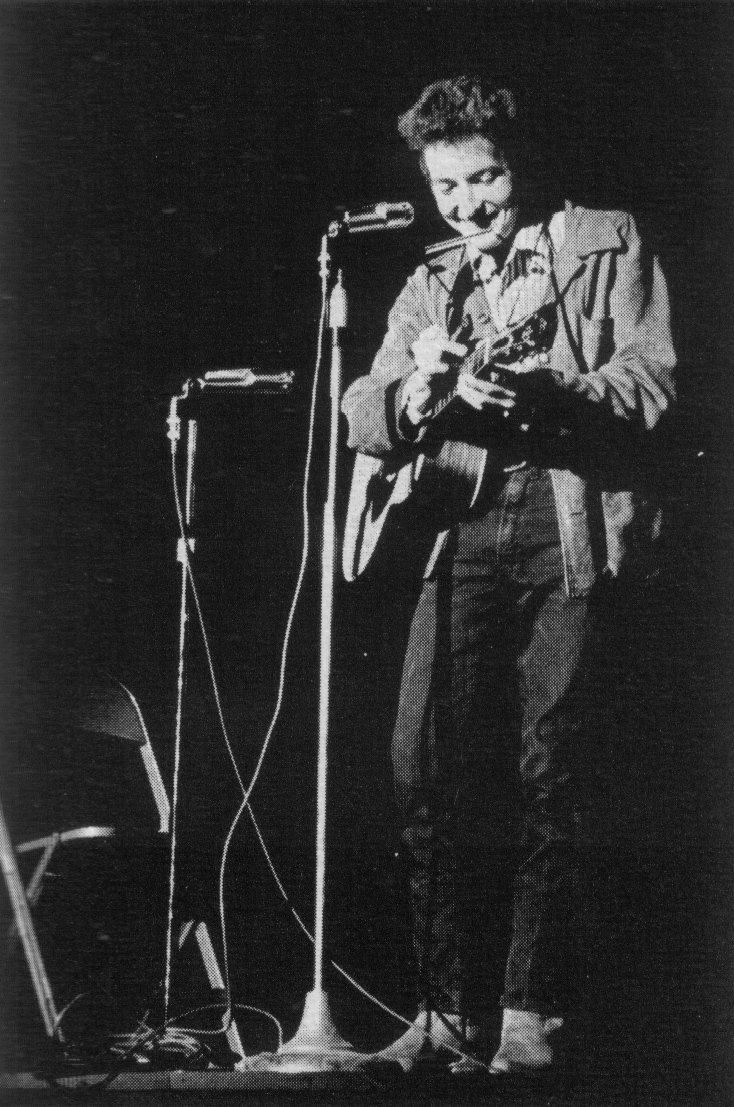
Bob Dylan performing at St. Lawrence University in November 1963

St. Lawrence hosts more than 100 student activities groups. St. Lawrence is home to the second oldest collegiate outing club in the nation (next to only Dartmouth College). The club annually sends students to climb all 46 peaks over 4,000 ft (1,200 m) of the Adirondacks during "Peak Weekend". Peak Weekend has recently celebrated its 25th anniversary at St. Lawrence. The Outing Club also has its own residence on campus and is part of the Theme Cottages. The club frequently sponsors trips for skiing, hiking, rafting and other outdoor activities.

Established in 1993 as a student-run coffeehouse, the Java Barn is a well-known venue among touring bands on the East Coast. In 2006 the music venue moved to the former Winning Health Center. In the fall of 2010, Java was moved once again to an area between The Student Center and Admissions Building. Java now occupies a former storage garage, with bright student-created murals spattering the walls.

The Student Government is also very active on campus. The Thelomathesian Society was founded in 1863 by Vasco P. Abbott who became its first President. The Thelomathesian Society, or Thelmo as it is often called, serves as the governing body of the St. Lawrence University Student Body, and is a forum for students to voice their opinions on issues presented by the Administration, Faculty, and Student Body. Thelmo debates and votes on a wide variety of issues, ranging from university policies to St. Lawrence University Student Activities Funding (SLUSAF) requests for different campus groups and organizations.

Theme Cottages are a popular housing option at St. Lawrence. The Women's Resource Center was founded to raise awareness of gender issues on and off campus. WRC members, or "Dub Girls", are trained as sexual assault victim advocates and create education programs to promote safe sexual practices. The Black Student Union and La Casa Latina houses both celebrate racial diversity by exemplifying racially diverse living. The Artists' Guild is a house that focuses on supporting and appreciating the visual arts. Commons College residents focus on charity fund-raising and building a living-learning experience through a house-shared course each semester. The H.O.P.E. (Helping Out People Everywhere) house focuses on community service, as the name suggests. The Java House is the living space for the students who run the campus's concert venue, the Java Barn. The L.I.G.H.T. (Living Inspirationally Growing Healthy Together) House is a theme house where students work to promote a healthy lifestyle centered on balance and self-awareness. The Outing Club House provides a living space for those who are highly involved in the campus's historic Outing Club. The Arts Annex is a space for students who strive for appreciation and support of the arts. Students living in the Arts Annex are members of the St. Lawrence University Performing Arts Collaborative (SLUPAC), and also work closely with TAUNY (Traditional Arts in Upstate New York), a non-profit organization dedicated to documenting, preserving and promoting the traditional folk arts and folklore of New York's North Country. Together, TAUNY and the students of the Arts Annex/SLUPAC work to help sustain a variety of arts throughout the North Country. The Campus Kitchens house is a space allotted for students who partake in St. Lawrence's chapter of the national organization, The Campus Kitchens Project. Students of Campus Kitchens work to cook hot meals for disadvantaged community members by utilizing donated food, by repurposing leftover campus food, and by using food grown on campus itself. The group also packs bagged lunches, which they call "Bear Packs," for disadvantaged Canton schoolchildren. The Greenhouse is home to many environmentally conscious students. Students in the Greenhouse live in an environmentally responsible manner, and provide weekly, healthy, locally sourced dinners. The Habitat for Humanity theme cottage houses students that actively work with the local chapter and national office of Habitat for Humanity. There is also a technology-centric theme house, The Hub, which provides gaming and technology events to the campus.

The Greek System now consists of four sororities and two fraternity chapters. In 1997 the school had five sororities and seven fraternities. The current state of Greek participation levels are substantially lower than in past years, due in part to liability issues and national chapter concerns over various alcohol and code violations. However the remaining chapters still have an active role in campus life.

=== Fraternities ===
Current:

- Alpha Tau Omega, 1882–2010, 2011–present
- Beta Theta Pi, 1879–2005, 2009–present

Past:

- Phi Kappa Sigma, 1959–2006
- Phi Sigma Kappa, 1902–2004
- Sigma Alpha Epsilon, 1919–1999
- Sigma Chi, 1953–1998
- Sigma Pi, 1931–2002

=== Sororities ===
Current:

- Delta Delta Delta, 1891–present
- Chi Omega, 1981–present
- Kappa Delta Sigma (Local Sorority), 1969–present
- Kappa Kappa Gamma, 1881–present

Past:

- Pi Beta Phi, 1914–1994
- Alpha Delta Pi, 1935–1983
- Kappa Delta, 1921–1969 (Left National to form Kappa Delta Sigma in 1969)

=== Residential life ===
St. Lawrence is a four-year residential university; the residential experience is integral to the educational process. Students are required to live in university residence halls, theme cottages or Greek chapter houses during each semester at the university. Each residential area has a residential coordinator (RC) who provide supervision, leadership and support for the residents in their units and perform administrative duties pertaining to their buildings. Community assistants (CA) are undergraduate students who assist RCs.

==== The First-Year Program (FYP) ====
A unique requirement of St. Lawrence's curriculum is the First Year Program. St. Lawrence's first-Year Program is one of the oldest living-learning programs in the country, helping students make successful transitions from high school to college, intellectually and socially, since 1987. Students live together and study in a team-taught FYP, developing the writing, speaking, and research skills needed for college. They continue to develop these skills in a spring First-Year Seminar. All first-year students live in residential colleges of the FYP. These are buildings or wings of buildings where approximately 30 students live together and enroll in a common course. A professional RC and upperclass CAs provide supervision.

==== Upperclass Residential Program ====
All upperclass students live in one of four housing options: residence halls, cottages, Greek chapter houses, or the senior townhouses. The majority of upperclass students live in residence halls, where most floors are coeducational. Singles, doubles, triples and quads are available and there are suites in a two-building complex. Room assignments are made on a class year priority. Theme suites and cottages are available for groups with special common interests. Groups must apply in the spring semester for the following year.

== Athletics ==
The St. Lawrence University Saints are a member of the Liberty League Athletic Conference, has ECACHL Division I Hockey teams and fields 32 varsity teams (15 for men, 17 for women) and includes over 40% of the student body. The Skating Saints men's team has twice played for Division I national championships (1961, 1988). The men's soccer program went undefeated at 22–0 to capture the 1999 Division III soccer championship, and women's basketball narrowly was defeated in the 2002 NCAA Women's Division III Basketball Championship. The Men's Squash team has had consistent success nationally. In December of 2014, the men's squash team rose to the rank of the #1 in the College Squash Association national rankings after beating then #1 Harvard University on December 6, 2014. That same season, the Men's Squash team advanced to the College Squash Association's Potter Cup Men's national championship match, which was the first and only time the St. Lawrence Men's Squash team has reached the national championship. They were defeated in the final by Trinity College (CT), securing a #2 final national ranking for the 2014–15 season, the highest in school history. The men's swim team won the 1976 D-3 National Championship. The St. Lawrence equestrian team was national champion in 1973, 1976, 1977 and national champion runner-up in 2001 and 2008. In addition, the SLU Equestrian Team was regional champion in 2001, 2003, 2005, 2006, 2008, 2009 and 2011. The St. Lawrence University wrestling team won the Division III NCAA championship in 1988. The wrestling team was discontinued in 1995. In 2009 women's cross country team placed second at nationals, and in 2010, the women's track and field team placed third at Indoor nationals, bringing home two individual national titles as well. The university sponsors teams for men's football and baseball, women's field hockey, volleyball and softball, and men's and women's basketball, men and women's lacrosse, cross country, golf, crew, ice hockey, riding, Alpine and Nordic skiing, soccer, squash, swimming, tennis and track and field. The University has a strong active rivalry (especially in Hockey) with nearby Clarkson University only 10 miles (16 km) away in Potsdam, NY. Other notable rivalries include Hobart and William Smith, also from the Liberty League. The Nordic and Alpine ski teams are also one of tradition. They compete in EISA with Division-I and Division-III schools.

Intramurals are also a popular option for students, with broomball being one of the more popular. The university also has a rafting/canoeing shack located at the edge of campus.

=== Ice hockey ===
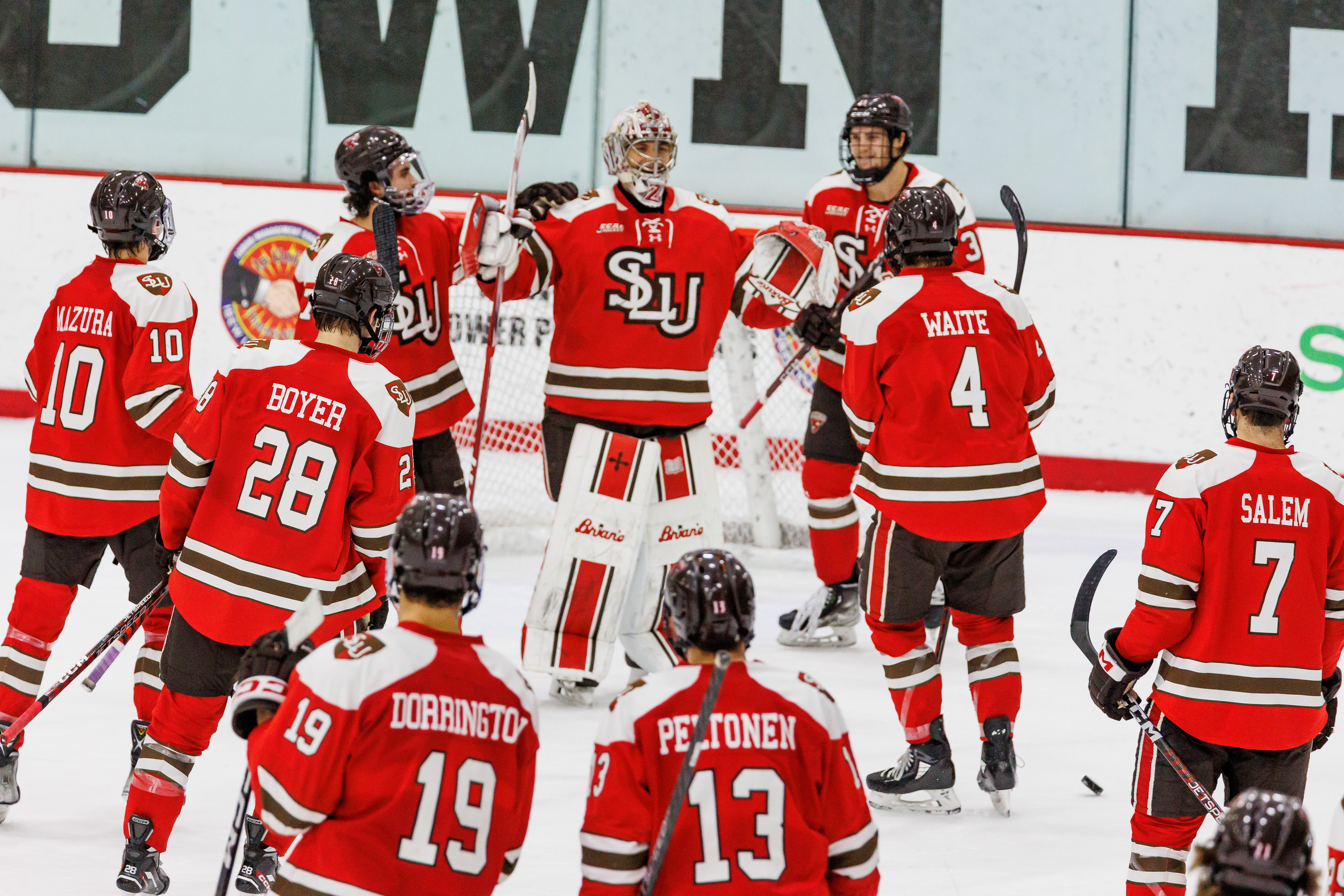
2022–23 Saints men

The Saints hockey program dates to 1925. The Saints hockey team compete at the NCAA Division-I Level in the ECAC league for both men and women. They play their home games and have additional training facilities in Appleton Arena which has a capacity of approximately 3,000 and was constructed in 1951. Since joining the league in 1951 The Saints were league champions in 1962, 1988, 1989, 1992, 2000 and 2001. They were also regular season champions in 2000 and 2007. Since 1951 the Saints have made the NCAA tournament sixteen times.

In 1988, the Saints played in the NCAA national championship game at the Olympic Arena in Lake Placid, NY, losing to Lake Superior State University 4–3 in overtime. The 1987–1988 season was the most successful in team history, with an overall record of 29-9-0. In 2000, the Saints played in the longest NCAA tournament game on record; a 3–2, quadruple overtime victory over Boston University. The win advanced the Saints to the Frozen Four, where the team eventually lost to Boston College in the national semifinals. The men's program has produced twenty-eight All-American players, seven ECAC tournament MVPs, six ECAC players of the year, four ECAC rookies of the year, and seven Hobey Baker Memorial Award finalists.

The women's team won three consecutive ECAC Division-III tournaments in 1990, 1991, and 1992 before moving to Division-I. Since then the women have won the ECAC championship once in 2012. They were runners-up for the NCAA Championship in 2001 and made appearances at the Frozen Four in 2004, 2005, 2006 and 2007, the last of which they hosted in Lake Placid, New York. The women's program has produced five All-American players, one ECAC tournament Most Outstanding Player, one ECAC player of the year, three ECAC rookies of the year, and two Patty Kazmaier Award finalists.

=== Athletic facilities ===
Indoor facilities include two field houses with track and five tennis courts; two regulation basketball courts; competition swimming and diving pool; ten squash courts; fitness center and weight room; climbing wall; ice arena; equestrian arena. Outdoor facilities include competition and practice fields for soccer, softball, baseball, football, lacrosse and field hockey along with a lighted artificial turf field; six lighted tennis courts; lighted all weather track and lighted football/track stadium; 18-hole championship golf course and a boathouse on the St. Lawrence River in Waddington. Recreation facilities include jogging/walking trail, cross country/mountain bike trails, intramural fields, outdoor basketball and volleyball courts. Since 1996 the almost all of the athletic facilities have been renovated, replaced or recently constructed. In 2008 the Princeton Review ranked St. Lawrence with the 20th best athletic facilities in the country and was the only Division III institution ranked.

== The campus ==
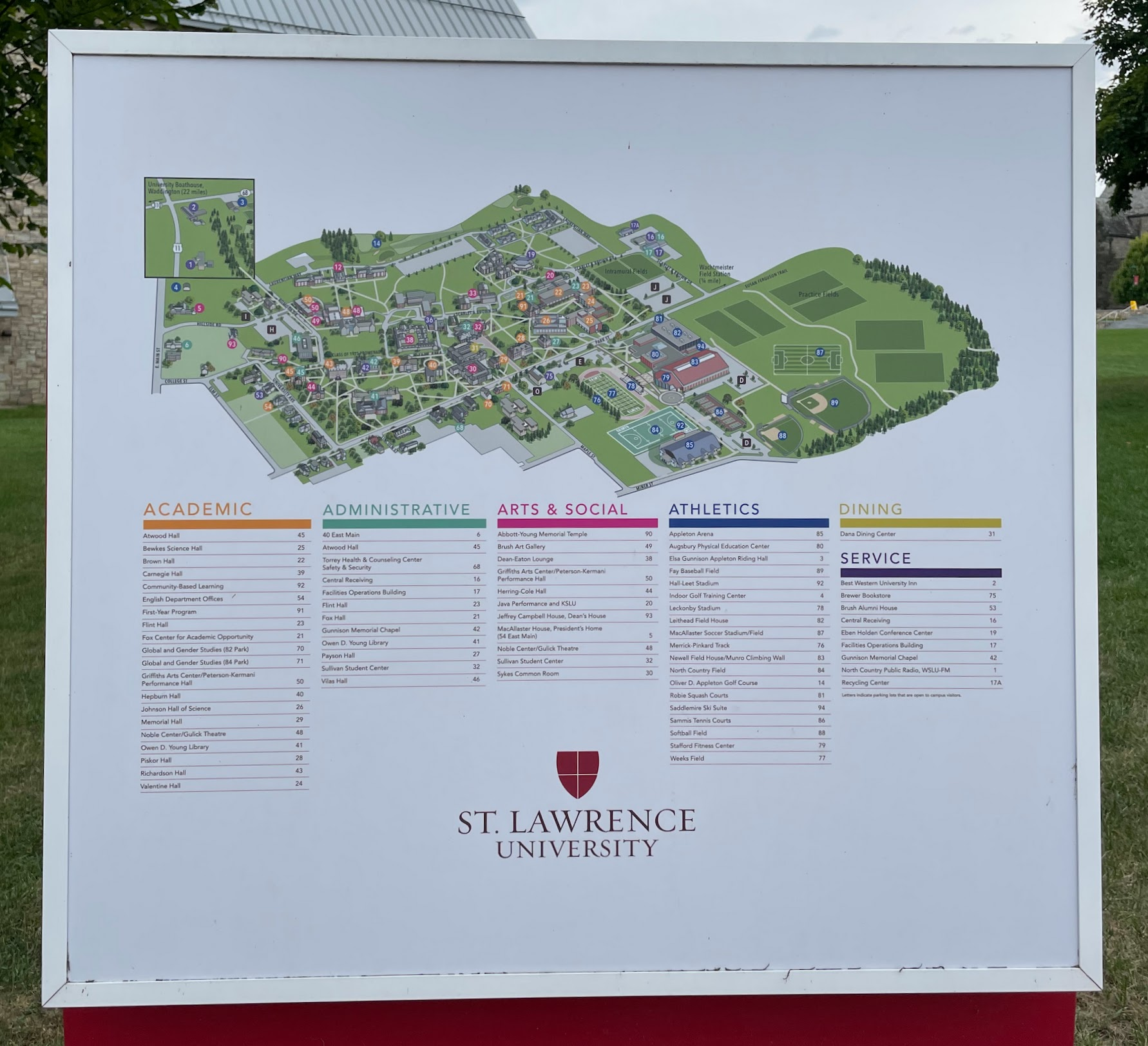
Campus map displayed on a sign

The 1,000 acres (400 ha) campus is located on the south side of the Village of Canton. The main developed area consists on only 20% of the total campus area, and is centered along Park Street. Most of this area is a "walking campus" that is off-limits to motorized vehicles. Parking lots are located on the edge of campus and cross campus traffic is limited to Park Street (north-south) and Romoda Drive and University Avenue (east-west). Roads such as Park Street, Hillside Avenue, College Street, Lincoln Street, and Maple Street connect the school to downtown Canton and main roads such as US Route 11, NY Route 68, NY Route 310, and County Route 27. The university maintains 30 academic residential, sports and other buildings.

The North Country Japanese Garden, funded by grants and donations, was designed by students who had visited Zen gardens in Japan. It is symbolic of elements found in Upstate New York as well as traditional Japanese symbolism.

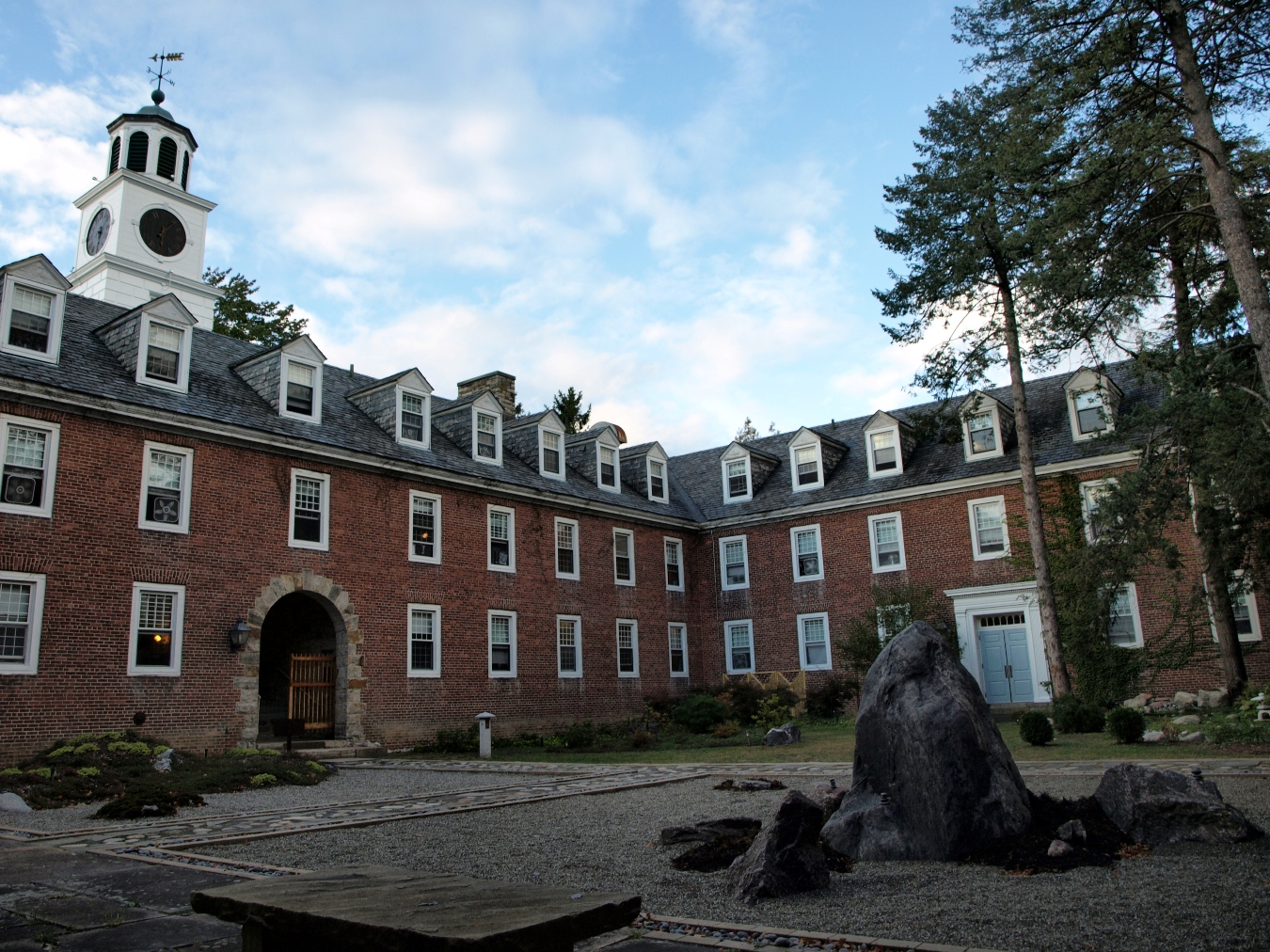
The North Country Zen Garden within Sykes Quad

=== Campus buildings ===
- Sullivan Student Center – Named for President Emeritus Daniel F. Sullivan '65, the new student center opened in 2004 and is the home of the offices for the department of student life, the career services offices, campus mail room, Northstar Café / Jack's Snack Shop, student financial services, and several student club offices. Also here are a game area, lounge, and the Winston Room (a multi-purpose venue for movies, guest speakers, and other events). The building was dedicated in honor of Dan and Ann Sullivan in May 2009.
- Owen D. Young Library – Built in 1959, expanded in 1980, and renovated in 1999–2000, this is the main campus library. Features include the Munn Writing Center, the "treehouse" study areas, two public computer labs, and a 24-hour study room. Is a member of the ConnectNY interlibrary loan system. The offices of information technology are also located here.
- Gunnison Memorial Chapel – The stone chapel, from whose bell-tower the university bells ring Monday through Friday from 5–5:30pm., was constructed in 1926. It is the site of many religious and spiritual services, and formal assemblies. Its larger stained glass windows depict scenes and academic majors at St. Lawrence, and the smaller, head-height, windows depict historical figures who have influenced the university and world in some way, including Emily Dickinson and Gandhi. The largest of all stained glass windows is in the rear of the chapel, over the entrance and reads a famous quote from one of the school's founders: "We have lit a candle in the wilderness that will never be extinguished."
- Richardson Hall – The oldest building on campus, constructed in 1856 when the university was chartered. It is home to the English department and the religious studies department. It is listed on the National Register of Historic Places.
- Piskor Hall – Originally owned by SUNY Canton, the St. Lawrence obtained this building in the 1960s. It is named after Frank P. Piskor, one of St. Lawrence's most beloved presidents. This building is currently home to the history, philosophy, anthropology and sociology departments.
- Memorial Hall – Home to St. Lawrence's Canadian studies and environmental studies programs.
- Herring-Cole Hall – The university's original library, this building was built in 1870, and expanded in 1903. Since being replaced as library by ODY Library, this building is now used primarily as a study area and reading room. It is also the site of some smaller formal ceremonies and guest lectures.

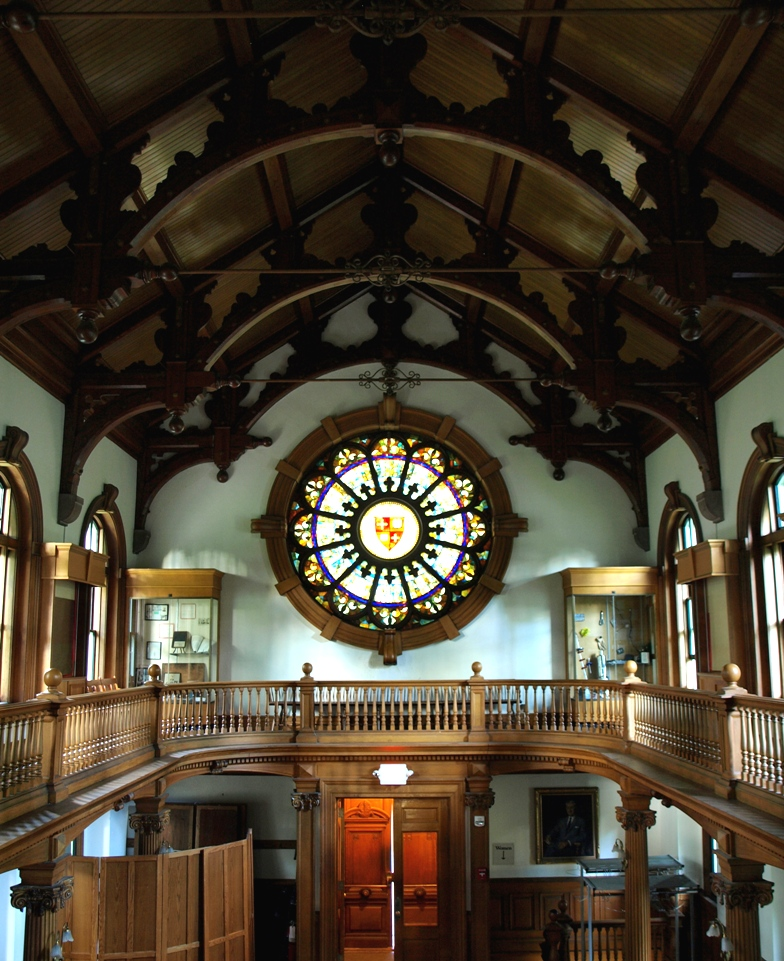
Herring-Cole Hall's interior

- Hepburn Hall – Originally built as a science building in 1926, the keynote speaker at its dedication was Marie Curie. Today, it is home to the departments of government and economics. Named in honor of A. Barton Hepburn.
- Carnegie Hall – Constructed in 1906 with funds from Andrew Carnegie, this building is the home of the International Studies Program, and the department of modern languages.
- Atwood Hall – Built in 1954, Atwood Hall is home to the Education Department and the university's graduate programs.
- Vilas Hall – The university's main administration building, built in 1965, houses offices like the registrar and the president's office.
- Payson Hall – This sandstone building was constructed in 1909, and has been home to many departments and programs over the years. In 1993 the building was recycled, keeping its exterior architecture, but renovating its interior to be a warm, inviting place for the Office of Admissions and Financial Aid.
- Augsbury Physical Education Complex, Newell Field House and Stafford Fitness Center – along with outdoor facilities, comprise one of the best collegiate athletic venues in the nation. All facilities have been built or renovated since 1998.
- Appleton Arena is a 3,000-seat multi-purpose arena. It is home to the St. Lawrence University Skating Saints ice hockey team. It was named for Judge Charles W. Appleton, class of 1897, the main benefactor of the arena. It opened January 20, 1951, and was remodeled in the late 1970s and early 1980s. In January 2020, the doors of Appleton were opened after a $10 million renovation, which included adding an LED video board.
- Johnson Hall of Science – opened in 2007 and features sustainable design for biology, chemistry, biochemistry, neuroscience and psychology study. A LEED Gold certified building, Johnson is Phase I of a multiple phase construction/upgrade project of the entire science facilities. Johnson Hall is named for its primary benefactor, trustee Sarah Johnson Redlich '82.
- Bewkes Science Hall – The departments of physics and mathematics, computer science, and statistics call Bewkes Hall home, with laboratories, classrooms and faculty offices available to each department. Student lounges are also available in each department's areas.
- Fox Hall – Home to computer labs, graphic and other multimedia computer equipment and a complete scientific library, all open to student use since the building's complete renovation in 1994. It is also home to the Science Writing Center, which provides peer writing tutoring for scientific writing. The first floor of Madill was renovated in 2018 and now also houses the Fox Center for Academic Opportunity, previously the Center for Student Achievement. It was originally named Madill Hall, but was renamed to Fox Hall in 2022 after former president William L. Fox (class of '75) and his wife Lynn Smith Fox, a former senior advisor on the federal reserve board.

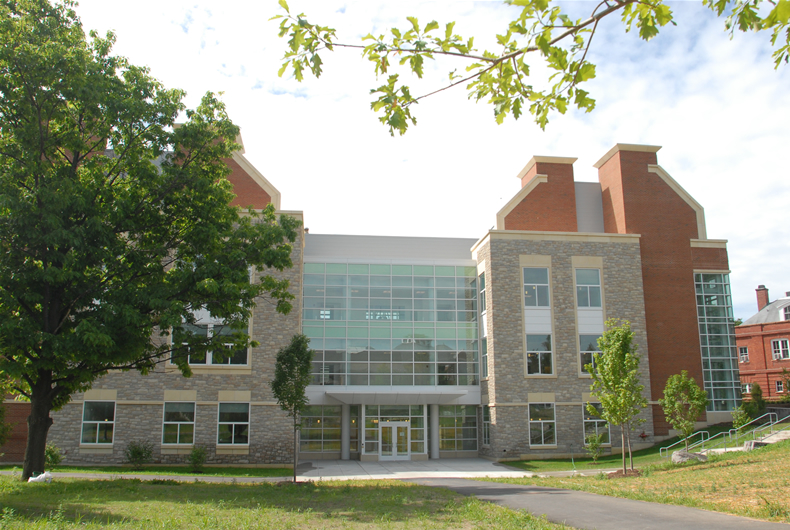
Johnson Hall of Science

- Valentine Hall – In addition to science classrooms and mathematics department offices, Valentine houses a state-of-the-art computer classroom designed for group work and guided study.
- Flint Hall - Home to the laboratories, classrooms and offices of the psychology department.
- Brown Hall – Home to the geology department, their collections, laboratories and classrooms.
- Wachtmeister Field Station – At the edge of campus, set near the woods and the Little River, the Wachtmeister Field Station gives faculty and students a place to prepare for and gather after their field research and labs. Faculty-student collaboration is at the heart of the St. Lawrence education.
- Griffiths Arts Center/Brush Art Gallery – Once the home of the campus center the 2005 renovation doubled the size of the arts facilities. You'll find in Griffiths, Gulick Theater, the site for most of the arts performances, films and guest lectures that occur on campus. The Richard F. Brush Art Gallery, which hosts an exhibition of student artwork among the eight to 10 shows every year, is also here, as are classrooms, laboratories, performance spaces, studios and offices for faculty in the fine arts, music and performance and communication arts departments. The Newell Center for Arts Technology, open January 2007, features collaborative work among all arts disciplines and many new studio and rehearsal spaces.
- Arts Annex – In addition to office space for faculty members from the performance and communication arts and fine arts departments, this building provides space for the music library and for student independent work. In addition to university music ensembles such as the University Chorus, Early Music Ensemble, Laurentian Singers, String Ensemble, and Wind Ensemble, students may also join more informal a cappella singing groups.
- Herring Cole Reading Room – St. Lawrence's first stand-alone library, Herring Hall was built in 1870; later, in 1903, the Cole Reading Room. One of two campus buildings listed on the National Register of Historic Places, Herring-Cole is the site of seminars, archival exhibitions about university history, guest lectures and receptions in which the entire campus community participates.
- North Country Public Radio – A National Public Radio affiliate, North Country Public Radio broadcasts local and regional news and other programs, in addition to national network programs such as A Prairie Home Companion and All Things Considered. In May 2011, the university also launched WREM, a radio station which offers a schedule of programming from Public Radio Exchange.
- Best Western University Inn – Owned by the university, with operation of the hotel and restaurant to private operators, The Best Western is a favorite with visiting students and families for admissions interviews, Family Weekend, and Commencement.
- MacAllaster House/President's Home – This historic home, given to the university for use as a home for the president, plays host to a variety of gatherings. A recent renovation and expansion was made possible through the generosity of the Torrey and MacAllaster families.

=== Campus residence halls ===
- Sykes Residence
- Dean Eaton Hall
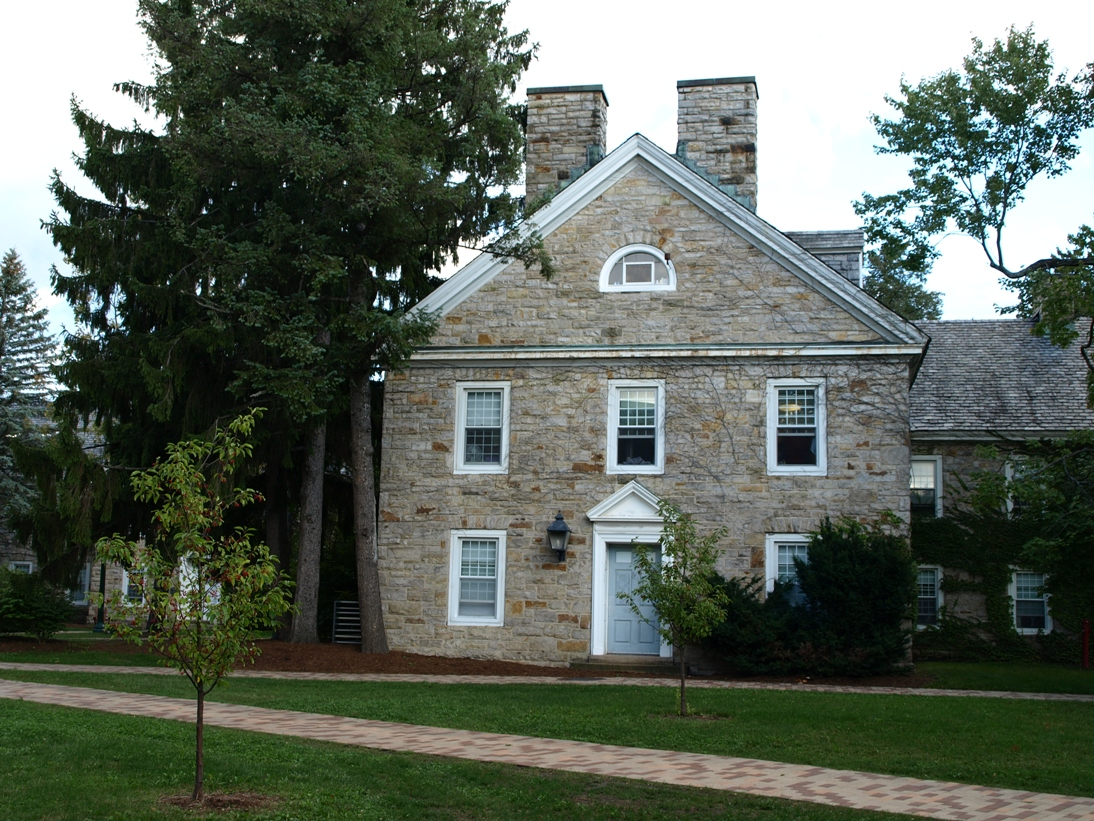
  Sykes Residence
- Gaines College
- Hulett & Jencks Halls
- Lee Hall
- Priest Hall
- Rebert Hall
- Reiff College
- Whitman Hall
- Kirk Douglas Hall
- 25 College St.
