= North Country Public Radio =

Public radio network in northern New York, United States

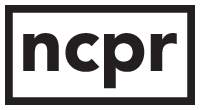
- Type: Radio network
- Branding: NCPR
- Country: United States
- First air date: March 7, 1968
- Radio transmitters: See § Stations and § Translators
- Headquarters: Canton, New York
- Broadcast area: North Country, New York; Vermont (limited); Ontario (limited); Quebec (limited)
- Owner: St. Lawrence University
- Webcast: Listen live (M3U); Listen live (PLS)
- Official website: northcountrypublicradio.org

North Country Public Radio (NCPR) is a National Public Radio (NPR) member regional radio network headquartered in Canton, New York. The member-supported network is owned by St. Lawrence University (SLU) and is the NPR member for the Adirondack North Country region of northern New York. Its radio studios are inside room number 201 of the E.J. Noble Medical Building adjacent to the SLU campus on East Main Street in Canton.

The flagship station, WSLU in Canton, signed on for the first time on March 7, 1968, on 96.7 MHz. It was a charter member of NPR. It adopted the on-air name North Country Public Radio in 1984. In the same year, WSLU moved to 89.5 MHz, (Note: For regulatory purposes, WSLU on 89.5 operates on a new license issued in 1985; the original 96.7 license was sold and is now WNCQ-FM 102.9.) and NCPR built the first of several low-powered FM translators. Much of the surrounding area was among the few places in the Northeastern United States that were still without public radio. Its first full-powered repeaters, WSLO in Malone and WSLL in Saranac Lake, began broadcasting in 1989, with additional stations signing on in the early 1990s.

It now comprises 18 full-power FM transmitters and 16 low-powered translators serving the North Country, parts of western Vermont and the Canadian provinces of Ontario and Quebec with regional and national news, public affairs programs, and an eclectic variety of music. Major cities in its coverage area are Watertown, Plattsburgh, and Glens Falls in New York, as well as Burlington, Vermont; Kingston, Ontario; and Cornwall, Ontario.

In May 2011, North Country Public Radio also launched WREM, a radio station in Canton which offers a distinct program schedule sourced from Public Radio Exchange.

In November 2024, NCPR signed on a new FM transmitter at Ellenburg, New York on 88.9 FM with a call sign WELN. The new signal will cover communities along Route 11 between Malone and Plattsburgh, NY which was previously a dead air zone.

== Stations ==
Call sign	Frequency	City of license	State	Facility ID	Class	ERP (W)	Height (m (ft))	Transmitter coordinates
WXLH	91.3 FM	Blue Mountain Lake	New York	66427	A	78	527 m (1,729 ft)	43°52′18.2″N 74°24′0.5″W
WXLB	91.7 FM	Boonville	New York	175085	A	100	107 m (351 ft)	43°26′53.2″N 75°20′46.6″W
WSLZ	88.1 FM	Cape Vincent	New York	176912	A	2,000	92 m (302 ft)	44°6′58.2″N 76°20′19.8″W
WSLU (Note: Flagship station)	89.5 FM	Canton	New York	66433	C2	40,000	91 m (299 ft)	44°32′1.2″N 75°5′48.7″W
WSLG	90.5 FM	Gouverneur	New York	175081	A	2,000	63 m (207 ft)	44°15′32.2″N 75°34′38.7″W
WXLE	105.9 FM	Indian Lake	New York	183338	A	590	−61.5 m (−202 ft)	43°45′27.2″N 74°14′44.5″W
WXLL	91.7 FM	Lake Placid	New York	176270	A	100	−32 m (−105 ft)	44°17′8.1″N 73°59′14.5″W
WXLD	89.7 FM	Lowville	New York	175083	A	220	80 m (260 ft)	43°48′31.4″N 75°30′40.2″W
WSLO	90.9 FM	Malone	New York	66431	A	200	106 m (348 ft)	44°49′46.1″N 74°22′29.6″W
WXLG	89.9 FM	North Creek	New York	66425	C3	200	608 m (1,995 ft)	43°40′22.2″N 74°2′56.4″W
WXLU	88.1 FM	Peru	New York	66428	C3	1,000	341 m (1,119 ft)	44°34′25.1″N 73°40′27.5″W
WSLL	90.5 FM	Saranac Lake	New York	66435	A	600	107 m (351 ft)	44°20′28.1″N 74°7′41.5″W
WXLS	88.3 FM	Tupper Lake	New York	175082	A	110	433 m (1,421 ft)	44°9′34.2″N 74°28′32.6″W
WSLJ	88.9 FM	Watertown	New York	66429	A	280	130 m (430 ft)	43°57′23″N 75°50′25″W
WXLJ	94.1 FM	Whitehall	New York	52637	A	3,000	100 m (330 ft)	43°28′37.2″N 73°26′54.4″W
WXLQ	89.1 FM	Bristol	Vermont	176918	A	160	181 m (594 ft)	44°13′24.1″N 73°7′25.4″W

=== Translators ===
Call sign	Frequency (MHz)	City of license	State	Facility ID	Class	ERP (W)	Height (m (ft))	Transmitter coordinates	Rebroadcasts
W217AE	91.3	Alexandria Bay	New York	66419	D	65	4.8 m (16 ft)	44°20′15.4″N 75°55′13.9″W	WSLJ
W272BL	102.3	Carthage	New York	148449	D	43	9.3 m (31 ft)	43°58′36.2″N 75°36′37.6″W	WSLJ
W262BO	100.3	Clayton	New York	147500	D	90	36.4 m (119 ft)	44°13′48.1″N 76°4′44.7″W	WSLU
W217CC	91.3	Elizabethtown	New York	153015	D	80	−176 m (−577 ft)	44°13′14.2″N 73°36′42.9″W	WSLL
W271AW	102.1	Jay	New York	153067	D	10	−215.8 m (−708 ft)	44°21′57.1″N 73°43′29.5″W	WSLL
W211BU	90.1	Keene	New York	86890	D	10	−56.5 m (−185 ft)	44°15′3.1″N 73°45′51.5″W	WSLL
W242AZ	96.3	Keene Valley	New York	152966	D	10	−361.1 m (−1,185 ft)	44°11′19.1″N 73°47′22.4″W	WSLL
W271DP	102.1	Lake George	New York	157065	D	10	384.2 m (1,260 ft)	43°25′12.2″N 73°45′35.4″W	WXLG
W219BG	91.7	Long Lake	New York	66417	D	9	76 m (249 ft)	43°57′39.2″N 74°25′17.5″W	WSLU
W212BQ	90.3	Morristown	New York	122757	D	55	46.1 m (151 ft)	44°35′17″N 75°38′34″W	WSLU
W247BB	97.3	Newcomb	New York	148374	D	10	68.3 m (224 ft)	43°57′22.2″N 74°10′24.5″W	WXLH
W282AV	104.3	North Creek	New York	153111	D	10	−137.4 m (−451 ft)	43°41′38.2″N 73°59′4.4″W	WXLG
W204BJ	88.7	Old Forge	New York	92529	D	19	54.6 m (179 ft)	43°42′4.2″N 74°58′18.6″W	WXLH
W205BW	88.9	Paul Smiths	New York	122754	D	55	25 m (82 ft)	44°26′11.1″N 74°15′35.5″W	WSLL
W237BR	95.3	Schroon Lake	New York	153091	D	110	−98.6 m (−323 ft)	43°51′16.2″N 73°45′26.5″W	WXLG
W248BL	97.5	Speculator	New York	122743	D	10	180.7 m (593 ft)	43°31′26.2″N 74°21′37.5″W	WXLG
W224BI	92.7	Wells	New York	148328	D	10	−129.2 m (−424 ft)	43°23′7.2″N 74°18′18.4″W	WXLG
