= Canton (village), New York =

Canton, New York
- Village; County Seat of St. Lawrence County
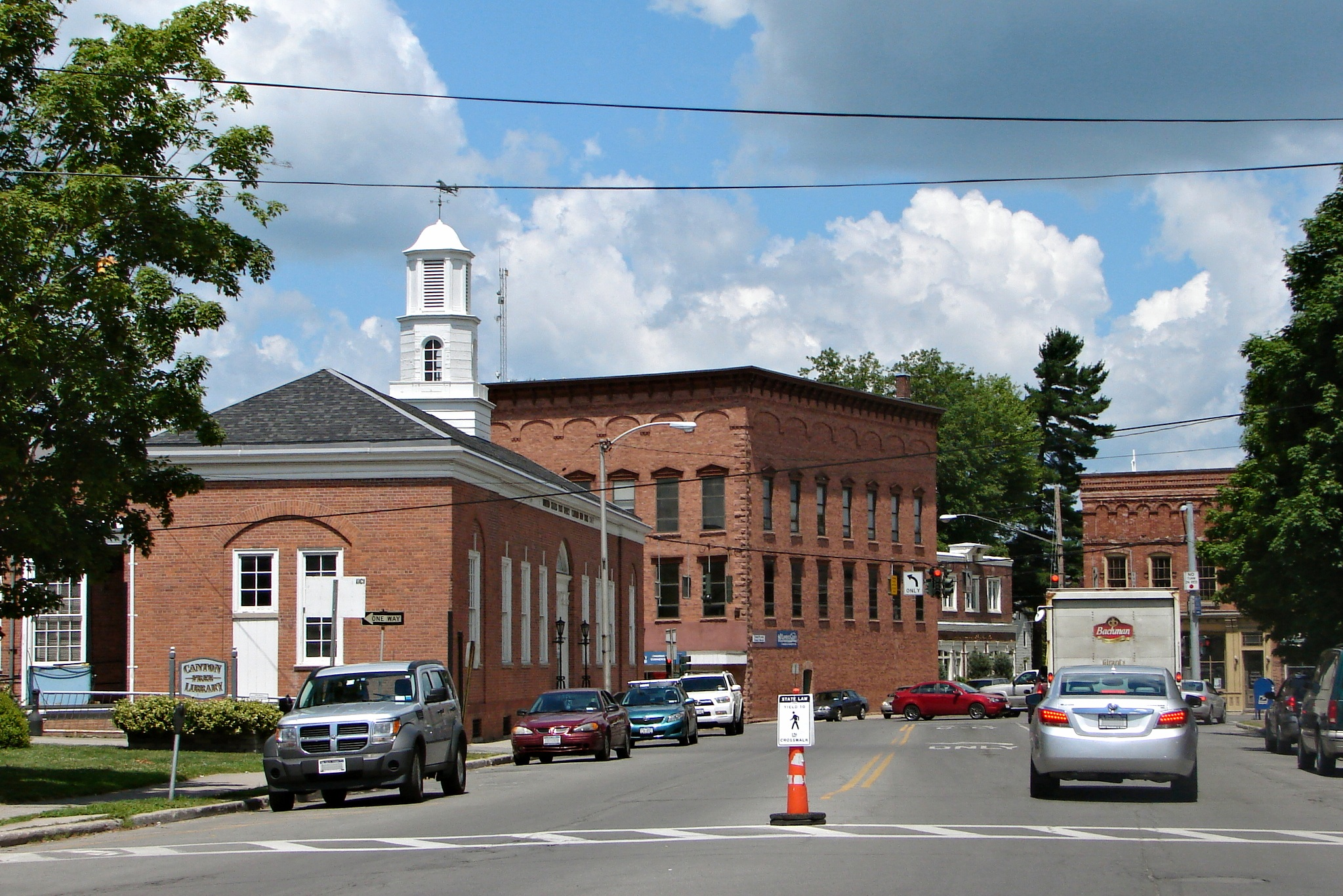
- Downtown Canton

- Location within the state of New York
- Coordinates: 44°35′51″N 75°10′16″W
- Country: United States
- State: New York
- County: St. Lawrence
- Named for: Canton, China

Area
  - Total: 4.27 sq mi (11.07 km^{2})
  - Land: 4.15 sq mi (10.74 km^{2})
  - Water: 0.13 sq mi (0.33 km^{2})
- Elevation: 377 ft (115 m)

Population (2020)
  - Total: 7,155
  - Density: 1,726.2/sq mi (666.49/km^{2})
- Time zone: UTC-5 (Eastern (EST))
  - Summer (DST): UTC-4 (EDT)
- ZIP Code: 13617
- Area codes: 518, 838
- FIPS code: 36-12331
- GNISfeature ID: 0976078
- Website: https://cantonny.gov/

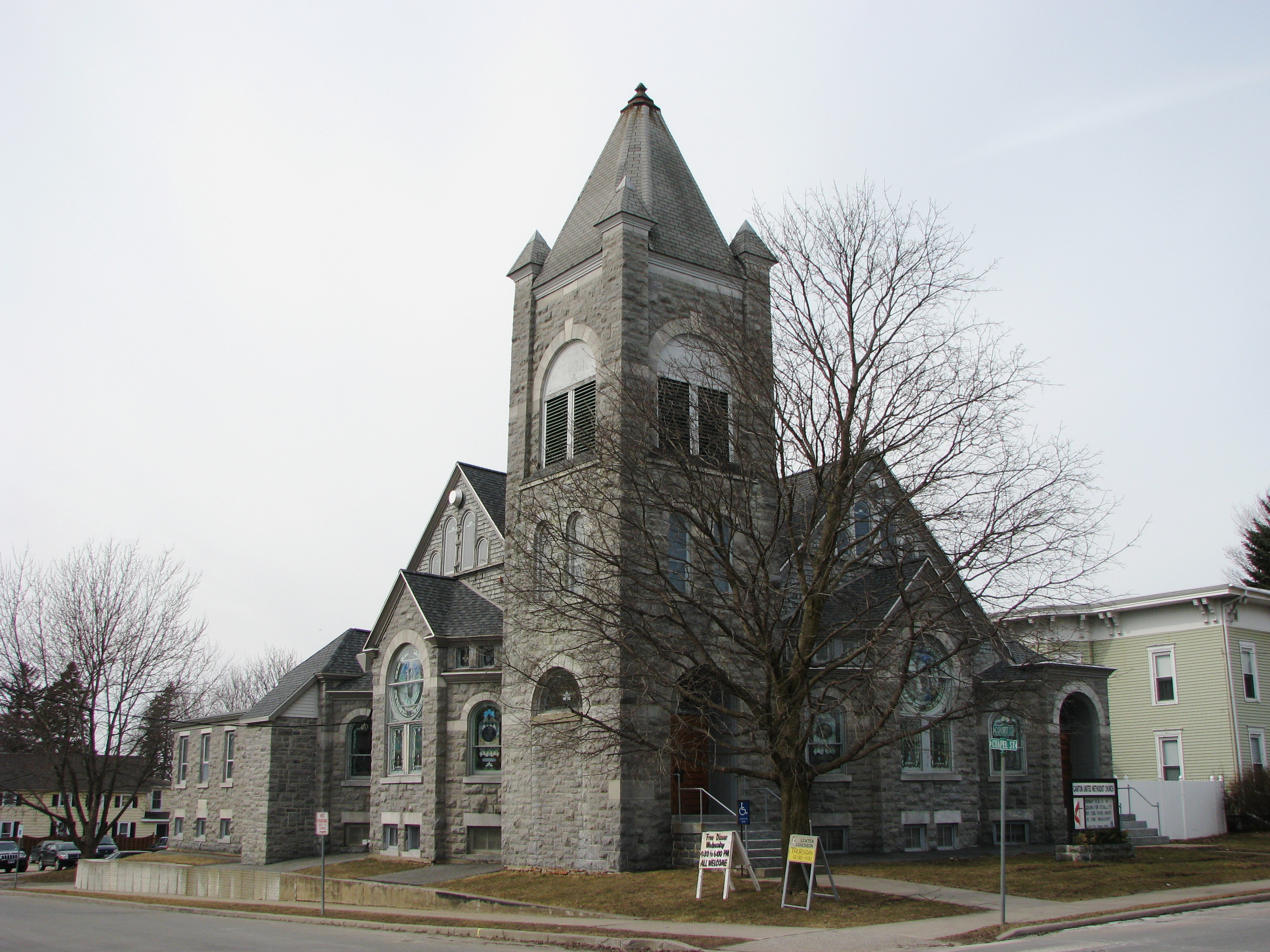
United Methodist Church of Canton

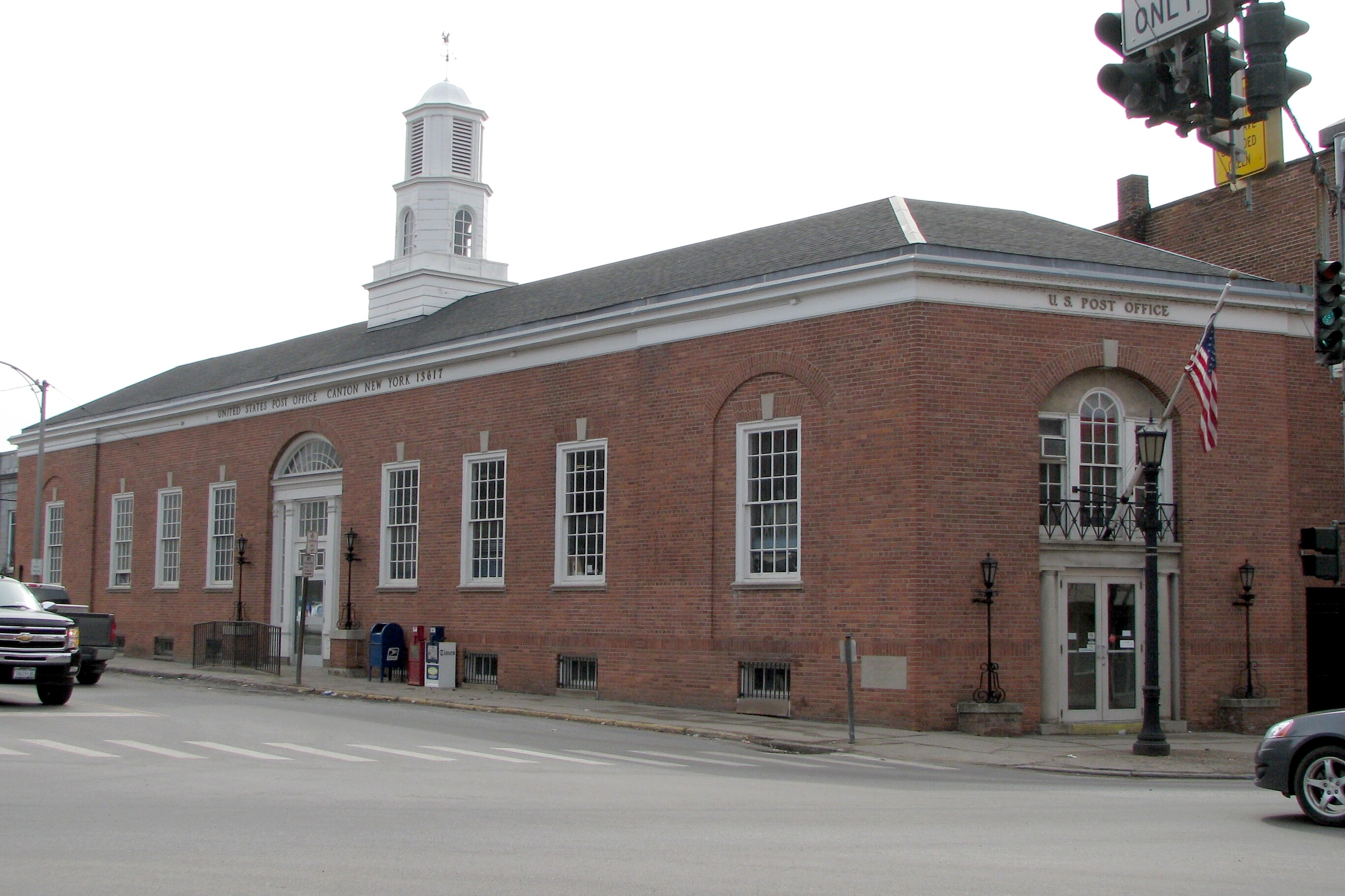
The United States Post Office (Canton, New York) is on the National Register of Historic Places

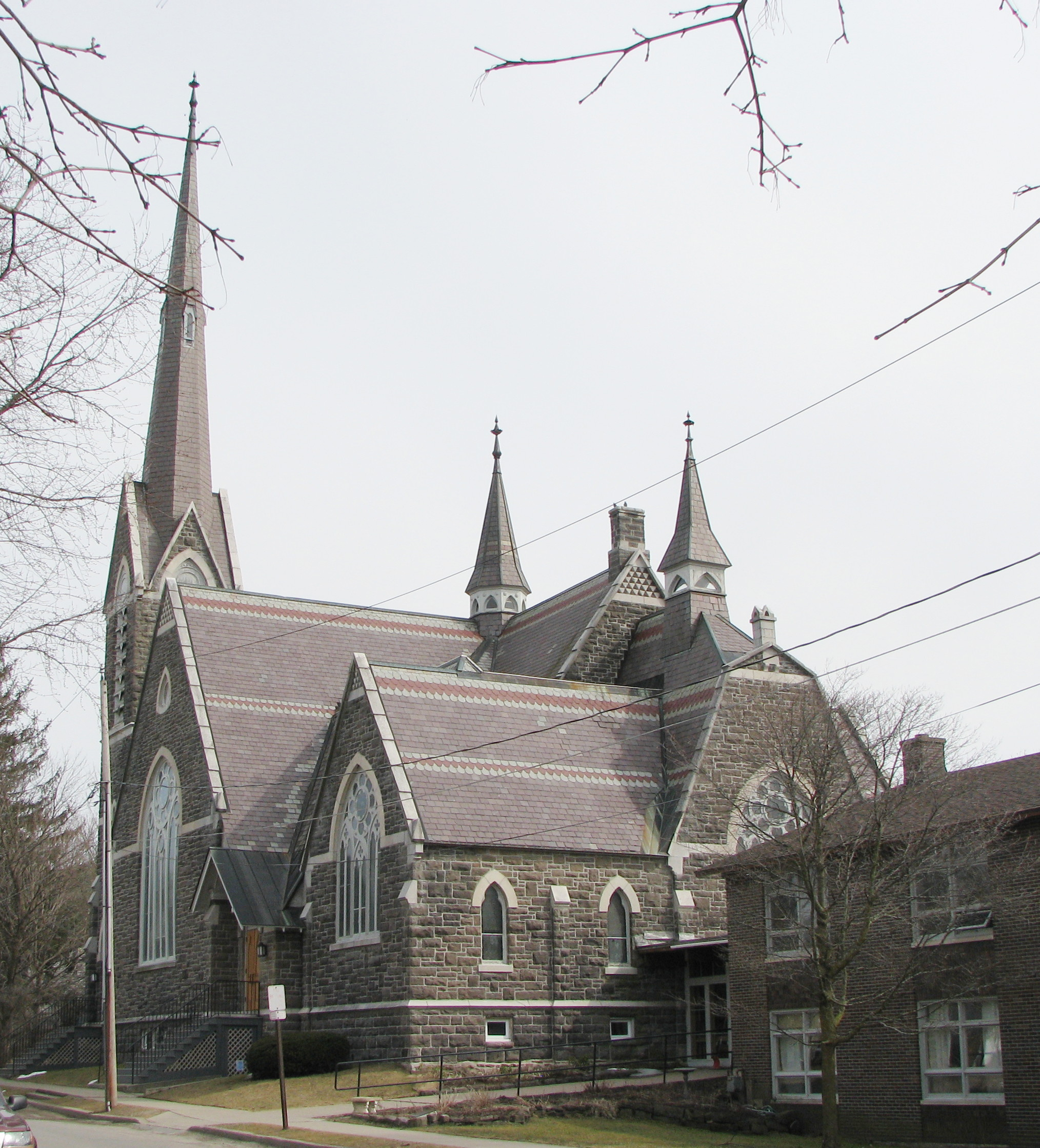
First Presbyterian Church of Canton

Canton is a village in – and the county seat of – St. Lawrence County, New York United States. The village is centrally located in both the town of Canton and the county of St. Lawrence. The population was 7,155 at the time of the 2020 census. The name comes from the Chinese city of Canton (now Guangzhou).

The village of Canton provides many municipal services, such as a fully functional village highway department, water and sewer department, volunteer fire department, court system, and police department, along with other municipal agencies.

== History ==
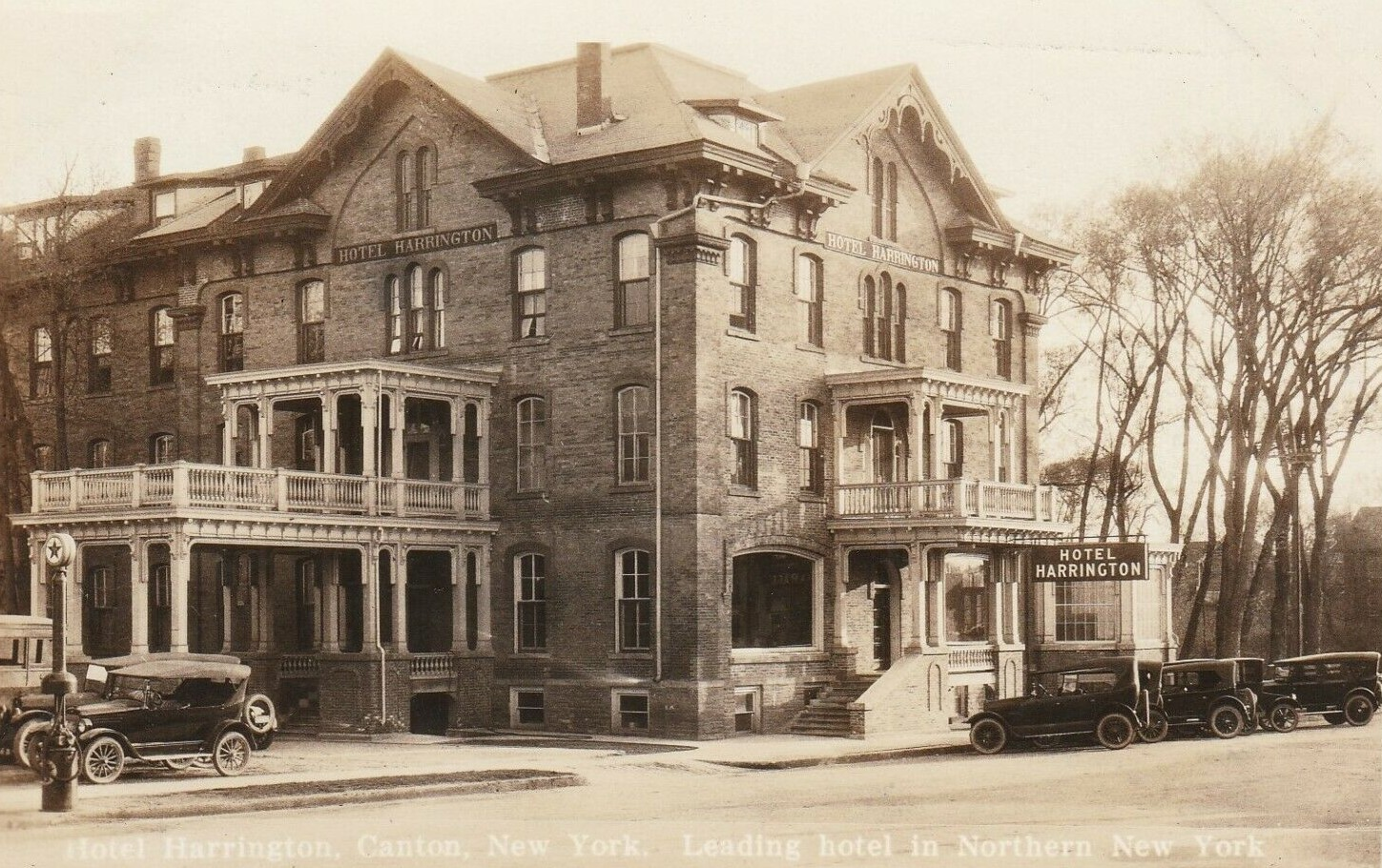
The Harrington Hotel in Canton, New York overlooked the Grasse River until it was demolished in 1959.

The first attempt at settlement was made in 1800, but the first permanent settlement occurred in 1801. The first post office used the name "New Cairo", but changed to Canton by 1807. The early economy was based on farming and lumbering.

The village was incorporated in 1845. Between 1887 and 1889, the village was modernized with a sewage system, water works, and electrical lighting.

St. Lawrence University was founded here in 1856, and the State University of New York at Canton (northwest of the village) was begun in 1906.

In addition to Herring-Cole Hall, Richardson Hall, and the Old Campus Historic District of St. Lawrence University, the Village Park Historic District and United States Post Office are listed on the National Register of Historic Places.

== Geography ==
According to the United States Census Bureau, the village has a total area of 3.3 square miles (8.7 km^{2}), of which 3.2 square miles (8.4 km^{2}) is land and 0.1 square mile (0.3 km^{2}) (2.99%) is water.

Canton is located on the Grasse River, a tributary of the St. Lawrence River.

The village is served by U.S. Route 11, New York State Route 68, New York State Route 310, and County Roads 27 and 24.

== Demographics ==
Historical population
Census	Pop.	Note	%±
1840	800		—
1850	1,000		25.0%
1860	1,560		56.0%
1870	1,681		7.8%
1880	2,049		21.9%
1890	2,580		25.9%
1900	2,757		6.9%
1910	2,701		−2.0%
1920	2,522		−6.6%
1930	2,822		11.9%
1940	3,018		6.9%
1950	4,379		45.1%
1960	5,046		15.2%
1970	6,398		26.8%
1980	7,055		10.3%
1990	6,379		−9.6%
2000	5,882		−7.8%
2010	6,314		7.3%
2020	7,155		13.3%
U.S. Decennial Census

As of the census of 2000, there were 5,882 people, 1,531 households, and 797 families residing in the village. The population density was 1,817.9 inhabitants per square mile (701.9/km^{2}). There were 1,680 housing units at an average density of 519.2 per square mile (200.5/km^{2}). The racial makeup of the village was 91.81% White, 4.49% Black or African American, 0.54% Native American, 0.99% Asian, 1.02% from other races, and 1.16% from two or more races. Hispanic or Latino of any race were 1.92% of the population.

There were 1,531 households, out of which 26.5% had children under the age of 18 living with them, 38.9% were married couples living together, 10.2% had a female householder with no husband present, and 47.9% were non-families. 38.9% of all households were made up of individuals, and 14.4% had someone living alone who was 65 years of age or older. The average household size was 2.13 and the average family size was 2.86.

In the village, the population was spread out, with 12.3% under the age of 18, 45.8% from 18 to 24, 16.7% from 25 to 44, 13.6% from 45 to 64, and 11.7% who were 65 years of age or older. The median age was 22 years. For every 100 females, there were 101.2 males. For every 100 females age 18 and over, there were 101.2 males.

The median income for a household in the village was $38,627, and the median income for a family was $59,211. Males had a median income of $38,818 versus $28,750 for females. The per capita income for the village was $14,745. About 8.5% of families and 15.6% of the population were below the poverty line, including 19.6% of those under age 18 and 7.1% of those age 65 or over.

== Education ==
The Village of Canton is home to two colleges. SUNY Canton is a two-/four-year college located in the western part of the village. Its entrance is accessible via NY Route 68 (West Main Street). SUNY Canton is also home to the David Sullivan St. Lawrence County Law Enforcement Academy, which provides police training to local, county, state and federal agencies, as well as new police officers, in its 5-month police academy every spring.

St. Lawrence University, a four-year liberal arts college located in the eastern part of the village, is home to several sports, including its famous NCAA Division I hockey team and several notable alumni. Access to the college is via US RT 11 (East Main Street).

Canton Central School District, which covers the entire village, is centered in the village of Canton at Hugh C. Williams Senior High School, home of the Golden Bears.

== Emergency services ==
=== Police department ===
The village's police department is located in the municipal building on Main Street. It is composed of a Chief of Police, three sergeants and five patrolmen. The department has one full-time and two part-time dispatchers.

In January 2025, Canton Police Chief Ryan Cole made an announcement that the village would be at full sworn officer capacity upon the hiring of one additional officer.

=== Fire department ===
The Canton Fire Department, located at 77 Riverside Drive, is an all-volunteer fire department with one chief, three assistant chiefs, and nearly 80 members. The department also operates a Paramedic Ambulance service and serves the people of the village and town of Canton as well as providing mutual aid services to surrounding towns. In 2008 the fire department answered over 1500 fire and EMS calls.

== Media ==
- WVLF-FM Mix 96.1
- WRCD-FM 101.5 The Fox
- WSLU, flagship station of North Country Public Radio

== Notable people ==
- George R. Malby, former US Congressman.
- Frederic Remington, the noted Western artist, was born in Canton.
- Silas Wright, a New York State Governor and political leader, made the area his home. Wright's home was made into the Silas Wright Museum in 1978, and is listed on the National Register of Historic Places. The site is owned by the St. Lawrence County Historical Association.
