= Miller House =

Miller House may refer to:

- Miller House (Fairbanks, Alaska), a former National Register of Historic Places (NRHP) listing in Yukon–Koyukuk Census Area, Alaska
- Miller House (Little Rock, Arkansas)
- Joaquin Miller House, Oakland, California
- The Abbey-Joaquin Miller House, Oakland, California
- Miller House (Lafayette, Colorado)
- Henry F. Miller House, Orange, Connecticut
- Capt. John Miller House, Eden, Florida
- Lloyd–Bond House or Miller House, Lloyd, Florida
- George McA. Miller House, Ruskin, Florida
- Allan Miller House, Chicago, Illinois
- Miller House (Columbus, Indiana)
- Alvin Miller House, Charles City, Iowa
- F.H. Miller House, Davenport, Iowa
- Severin Miller House, Davenport, Iowa
- Justice Samuel Freeman Miller House, Keokuk, Iowa
- John Andrew Miller House, Georgetown, Kentucky
- William Miller House (Hodgenville, Kentucky), NRHP-listed in LaRue County
- Miller House (Minden, Louisiana), NRHP-listed in Webster Parish
- Edward Miller House, Quincy, Massachusetts
- Isaac Miller House, St. Joseph, Missouri
- Horace Gilbert House, also known as the Morgan and Enos Miller House, Swartz Creek, Michigan
- Harmon Miller House, near Hudson, New York
- Johannes Miller House, Montgomery, New York
- Paschal Miller House, Morristown, New York
- McAlpin–Miller House, New York City
- William Starr Miller House, New York City
- Elijah Miller House, North White Plains, New York
- Charles A. Miller House, Cincinnati, Ohio
- Thomas Miller House, near Elizabethtown, Ohio
- Claude Hayes Miller House, Portland, Oregon
- Fred O. Miller House, Portland, Oregon
- Henry B. Miller House, Portland, Oregon
- William Davis Miller House, Wakefield, Rhode Island
- Washington Miller House, Columbia, Tennessee, NRHP-listed in Maury County
- Miller House (Elba, Tennessee)
- Miller House (Houston, Texas), NRHP-listed in Harris County
- Samuel Miller House, Lynchburg, Virginia
- The William Miller House, Richmond, Virginia
- Miller House (Washington, D.C.)
- Joseph S. Miller House, Kenova, West Virginia
- Miller House (Cooksville, Wisconsin)
- Miller House (Madison, Wisconsin)

== See also ==
- Miller Farm (disambiguation)
- Daniel Miller House (disambiguation)
- George Miller House (disambiguation)
- Henry Miller House (disambiguation)
- Joaquin Miller Cabin, Washington, D.C.
- Miller and Herriott House, Los Angeles, California
- Miller-Blanton House, New Haven, Kentucky, listed on the NRHP in LaRue County
- Miller-Claytor House, Lynchburg, Virginia
- Miller-Cory House, Westfield, New Jersey
- Miller-Kingsland House, Boonton, New Jersey
- Miller-Leuser Log House, Cincinnati, Ohio
- Miller-Mackey House, Lancaster, New York
- Miller-O'Donnell House, Mobile, Alabama
- Miller's House at Red Mills, Shawangunk, New York
- Oliver Miller Homestead, a museum and site of the James Miller House, near Bethel Park, Pennsylvania
- Price-Miller House, Hagerstown, Maryland
- Rush-Miller House, near Smoketown, West Virginia
- Whilldin-Miller House, West Cape May, New Jersey
- William Miller House (disambiguation)
