= Morristown (hamlet), New York =

Morristown, New York
- Hamlet and CDP
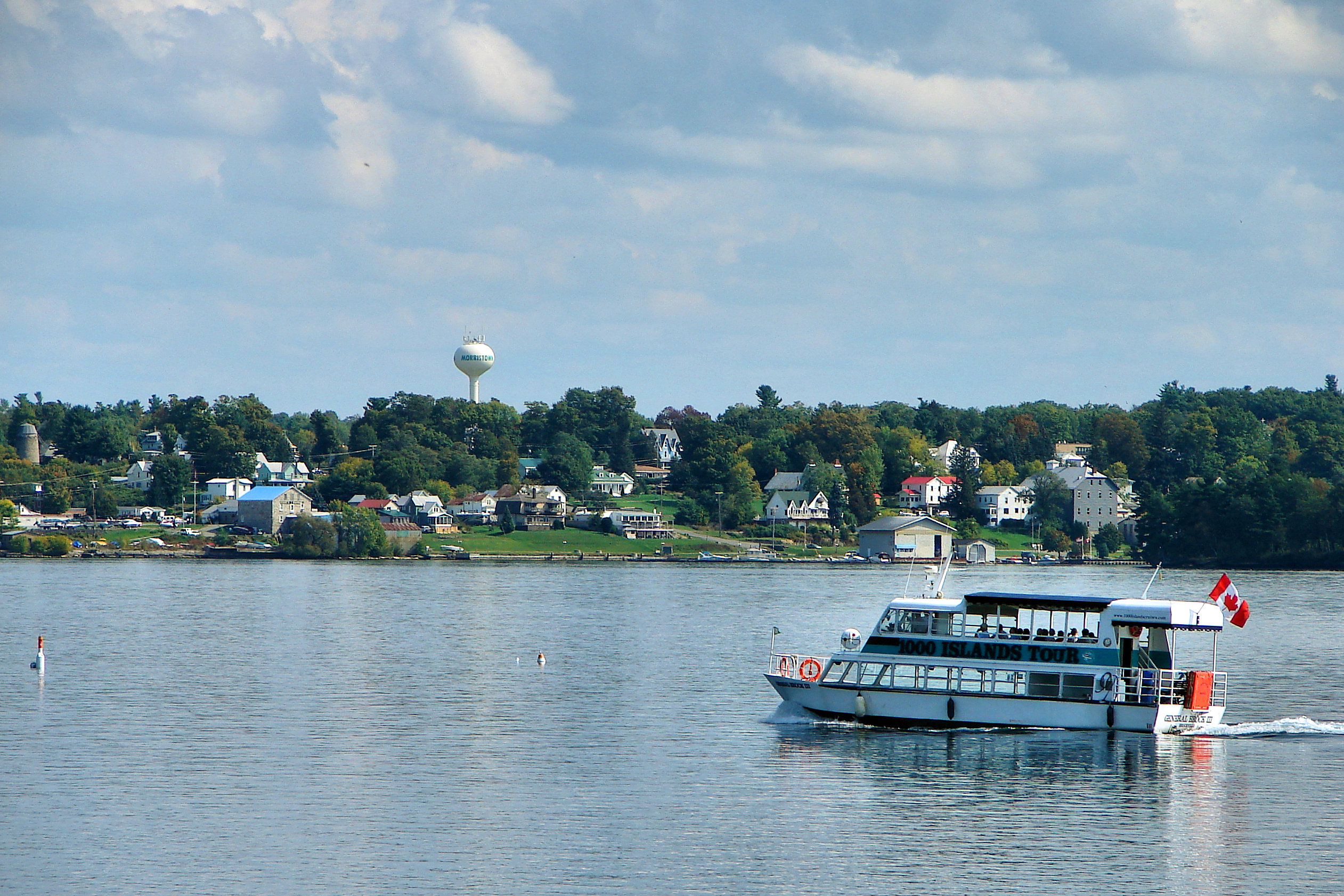

- Location within the state of New York
- Coordinates: 44°35′8″N 75°38′53″W
- Country: United States
- State: New York
- County: St. Lawrence

Area
  - Total: 1.02 sq mi (2.65 km^{2})
  - Land: 0.98 sq mi (2.54 km^{2})
  - Water: 0.039 sq mi (0.10 km^{2})
- Elevation: 289 ft (88 m)

Population (2010)
  - Total: 395
  - Estimate (2019): 377
  - Density: 383.9/sq mi (148.22/km^{2})
- Time zone: UTC-5 (EST)
  - Summer (DST): UTC-4 (EDT)
- FIPS code: 36-48571
- GNIS feature ID: 0976680

Morristown is a hamlet and former village along the Saint Lawrence River in St. Lawrence County, New York, United States. The population was 395 at the 2010 census. The village is named after Gouverneur Morris.

The hamlet is on the northern edge of the Town of Morristown and was north of Gouverneur.

Jacques Cartier State Park is southwest of the village.

The former village has their own school, Morristown Central School.

== History ==
The first settlers of the town began the community around 1804, but the village was not permanently settled until 1808.

During the opening days of the War of 1812, a naval battle took place between two warships in the river opposite the village.

Due to the lack of water power, early milling was accomplished by a windmill (1825) and later by a steam-powered mill.

The Land Office, Jacob Ford House, McConnell's Windmill, Samuel Stocking House, Paschal Miller House, Morristown Schoolhouse, United Methodist Church, and Wright's Stone Store are listed on the National Register of Historic Places.

On June 27, 2018, village residents voted to dissolve the village with a yes vote of 130–47. It took effect on December 31, 2019.

== Notable people ==
- William H. Comstock, patent medicine manufacturer, including Dr. Morse's Indian Root Pills.
- William H. 'Willie' Johnston, youngest Medal of Honor winner. Born and lived here as a child, moved to Montreal, then Derby, Vermont. Enlisted December 1, 1861, at age 11, with Co. D, 3rd Vermont Infantry. At the Battles around Richmond in June 1862, while soldiers were retreating from the field, he was the only drummer to keep his kit. He had the honor of drumming the next division parade on July 4, 1862. Medal presented by Secretary of War Stanton.

Morristown is named after Gouverneur Morris, a signer of the Constitution and Declaration of Independence. He was a land baron and owned a tract of land from Gouverneur, NY to the St. Lawrence River, including the village of Morristown.

== Geography ==
According to the United States Census Bureau, the village had a total area of 1.0 square mile (2.6 km^{2}), of which 1.0 square miles (2.5 km^{2}) is land and 0.1 square mile (0.1 km^{2}) (4.90%) is water.

The village was north of the junction of New York State Route 12, New York State Route 37, and New York State Route 58.

The village was on the south bank of the Saint Lawrence River, opposite the City of Brockville in Canada.

== Demographics ==
Historical population
Census	Pop.	Note	%±
1880	397		—
1890	472		18.9%
1900	466		−1.3%
1910	540		15.9%
1920	489		−9.4%
1930	505		3.3%
1940	540		6.9%
1950	546		1.1%
1960	541		−0.9%
1970	532		−1.7%
1980	461		−13.3%
1990	490		6.3%
2000	456		−6.9%
2010	395		−13.4%
2020	398		0.8%
U.S. Decennial Census

As of the census of 2000, there were 456 people, 180 households, and 117 families residing in the village. The population density was 466.4 inhabitants per square mile (180.1/km^{2}). There were 232 housing units at an average density of 237.3 per square mile (91.6/km^{2}). The racial makeup of the village was 96.93% White, 1.32% Black or African American, 0.88% Native American, 0.44% Asian, 0.22% from other races, and 0.22% from two or more races. Hispanic or Latino of any race were 1.54% of the population.

There were 180 households, out of which 31.7% had children under the age of 18 living with them, 48.3% were married couples living together, 12.8% had a female householder with no husband present, and 35.0% were non-families. 30.6% of all households were made up of individuals, and 12.8% had someone living alone who was 65 years of age or older. The average household size was 2.47 and the average family size was 3.01.

In the village, the population was spread out, with 27.9% under the age of 18, 5.7% from 18 to 24, 27.0% from 25 to 44, 25.9% from 45 to 64, and 13.6% who were 65 years of age or older. The median age was 37 years. For every 100 females, there were 92.4 males. For every 100 females age 18 and over, there were 88.0 males.

The median income for a household in the village was $27,969, and the median income for a family was $30,938. Males had a median income of $26,563 versus $20,000 for females. The per capita income for the village was $14,156. About 12.1% of families and 18.9% of the population were below the poverty line, including 26.7% of those under age 18 and 3.5% of those age 65 or over.

== Education ==
The former village is in the Morristown Central School District.

== See also ==
- Raid on Elizabethtown
