= William Miller House =

William Miller House may refer to:

- William Miller House (Hodgenville, Kentucky), listed on the National Register of Historic Places in LaRue County, Kentucky
- William Starr Miller House, a mansion in New York City
- William Davis Miller House, Wakefield (South Kingstown), Rhode Island, NRHP-listed
- The William Miller House, a historic home in Richmond, Virginia, within the NRHP-listed Fan District
- William Miller House (Miller Place, New York), an early 18th-century house in Miller Place, New York

== See also ==
- Miller House (disambiguation)
