= Stone Windmill =

Stone Windmill can refer to:

- Stone Windmill (Morristown, New York), also known as McConnell's Windmill. listed in the U.S. National Register of Historic Places
- a windmill made of stone
