= Miller Farm =

Miller Farm or Miller Farmstead may refer to:

== United States ==
(by state)

- Miller Farmstead (La Crosse, Kansas), listed on the listed on the National Register of Historic Places (NRHP) in Rush County
- Miller Farmstead (Minden, Louisiana), listed on the NRHP in Webster Parish
- Routzahn-Miller Farmstead, Middletown, Maryland, listed on the NRHP in Frederick County
- Wilson-Miller Farm, Sharpsburg, Maryland, listed on the NRHP in Washington County
- Miller Farmstead (Penwell, New Jersey), Anderson and Changewater, New Jersey, listed on the NRHP in Hunterdon and Warren counties
- Miller Farm (Baltimore, Ohio), listed on the NRHP in Fairfield County
- Miller Farmstead (Roan Mountain, Tennessee), located in Roan Mountain State Park
- Martin-Miller Farm, Rowland Station, Tennessee, listed on the NRHP in Warren County

== See also ==
- Miller House (disambiguation)
