= United Methodist Church (Morristown, New York) =

Historic church in New York, United States

- U.S. National Register of Historic Places
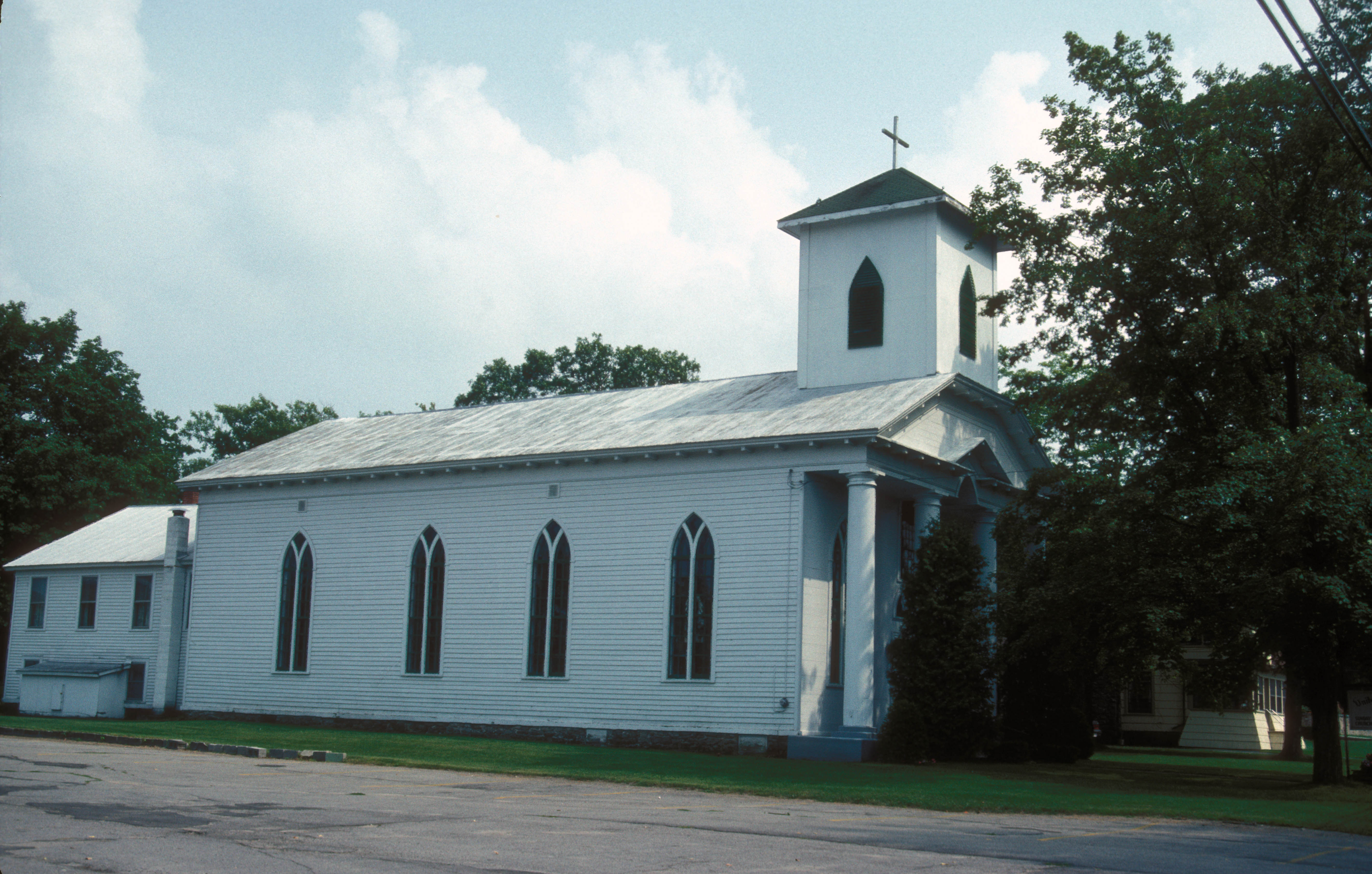
- United Methodist Church, September 1970

- Location within New York Location within the United States
- Location: Gouveneur St., Morristown, New York
- Coordinates: 44°35′10″N 75°38′46″W
- Area: less than one acre
- Built: 1838
- MPS: Morristown Village MRA
- NRHP reference No.: 82004690
- Added to NRHP: September 2, 1982

United Methodist Church is a historic United Methodist church located at Morristown in St. Lawrence County, New York. The church was built about 1838 and is a rectangular, 1 1/2-story frame structure with a gable roof. The interior features pressed tin walls and ceiling.

It was listed on the National Register of Historic Places in 1982.

The church will close permanently on August 18, 2013.
