= Young Memorial Church =

Historic church in New York, United States

- U.S. National Register of Historic Places
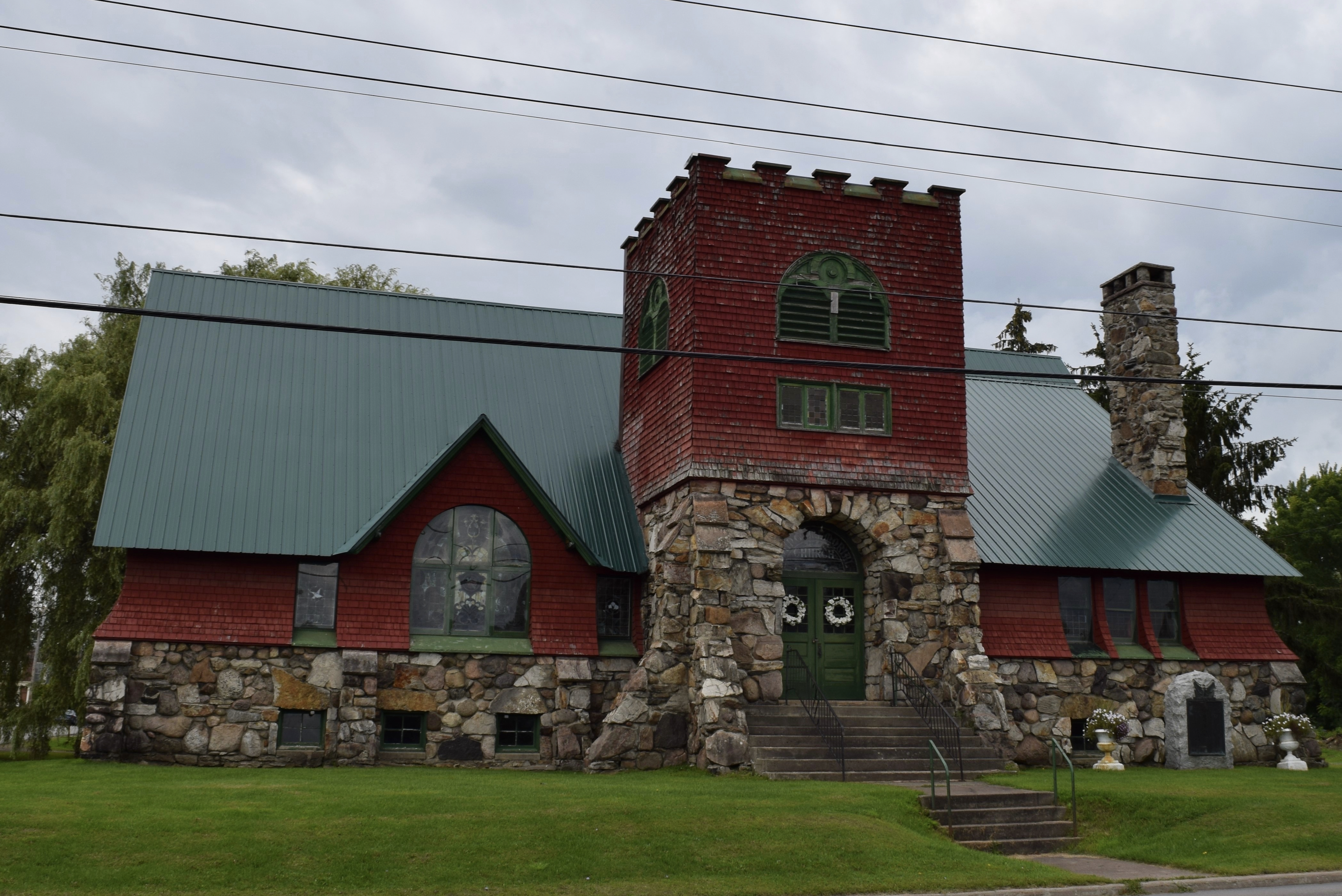

- Location within New York Location within the United States
- Location: Junction of School St. and NY 37, Brier Hill, New York
- Coordinates: 44°31′54″N 75°39′47″W
- Area: less than one acre
- Built: 1907-1908
- Architect: Williams, Samuel D.P.
- Architectural style: Arts and Crafts
- NRHP reference No.: 11000293
- Added to NRHP: May 18, 2011

Young Memorial Church, also known as Brier Hill Congregational Church, is a historic Congregational church in the hamlet of Brier Hill in Morristown, St. Lawrence County, New York. It was built in 1907–1908 and is a one-story, stone and wood shingled church building in the Arts and Crafts style. It features a steeply pitched gable roof, a tall stone chimney, opaque art glass windows by Harry James Horwood, and a central two-story square tower with a crenelated top.

The church building housed a Congregational church until the 1950s. Subsequently, it was used by a Baptist congregation until 1985. As of 2010, it had not been used since the Baptist group left.

It was listed on the National Register of Historic Places in 2010.
