= Land Office (Morristown, New York) =

Historic commercial building in New York, United States

- U.S. National Register of Historic Places
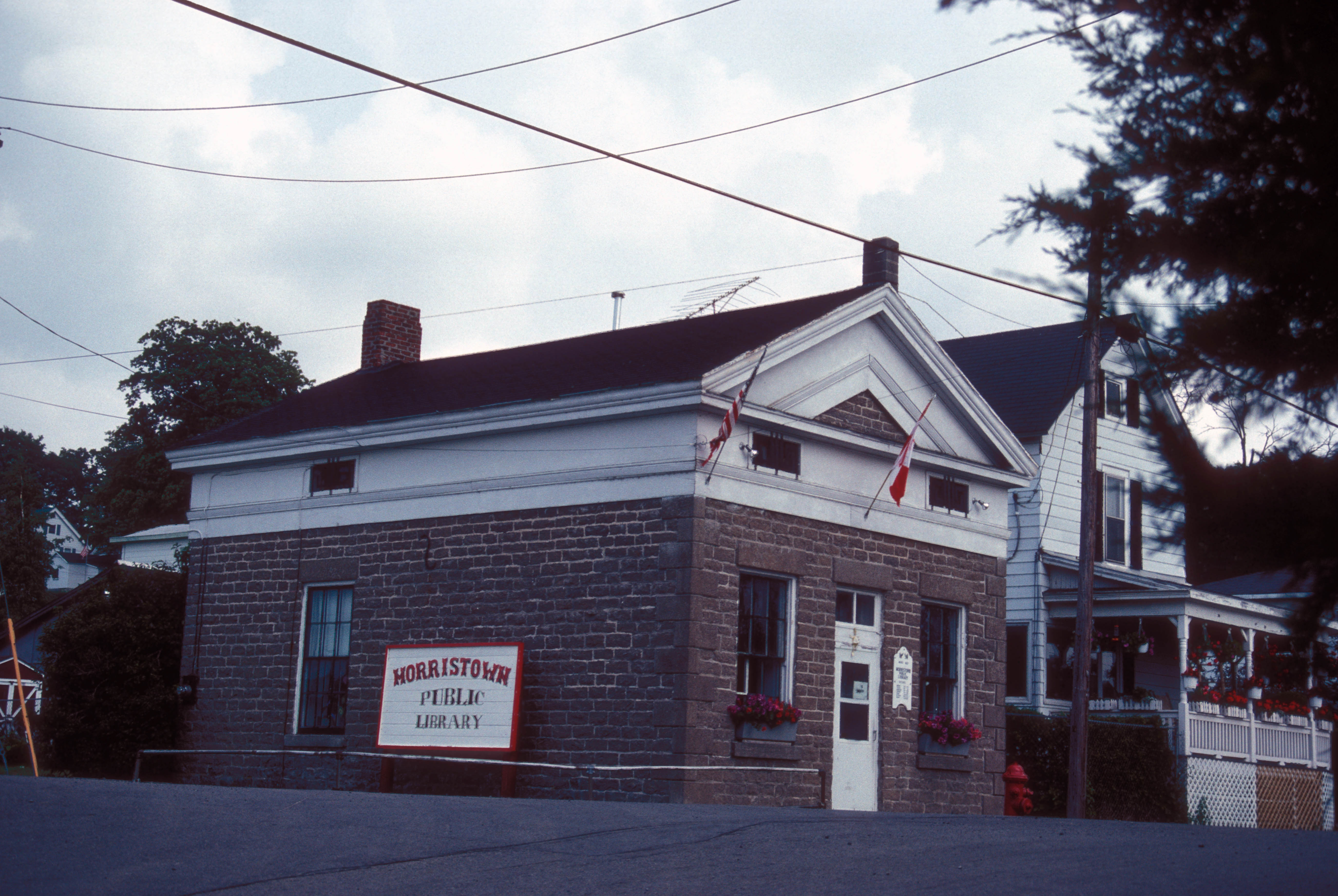

- Location within New York Location within the United States
- Location: Main St. Morristown, New York, U.S.
- Coordinates: 44°35′20″N 75°39′2″W
- Area: less than one acre
- Built: 1821
- Architectural style: Greek Revival
- MPS: Morristown Village MRA
- NRHP reference No.: 82004685
- Added to NRHP: September 2, 1982

Land Office (also known as Morristown Library) is a historic office building located at Morristown in St. Lawrence County, New York. It is a 1 1/2-story limestone building with a pedimented roof built about 1821. It was the land office for the Chapman family until 1904, when it was deeded to the village for use as a public library.

It was listed on the National Register of Historic Places in 1982.
