= Morristown Schoolhouse =

- U.S. National Register of Historic Places
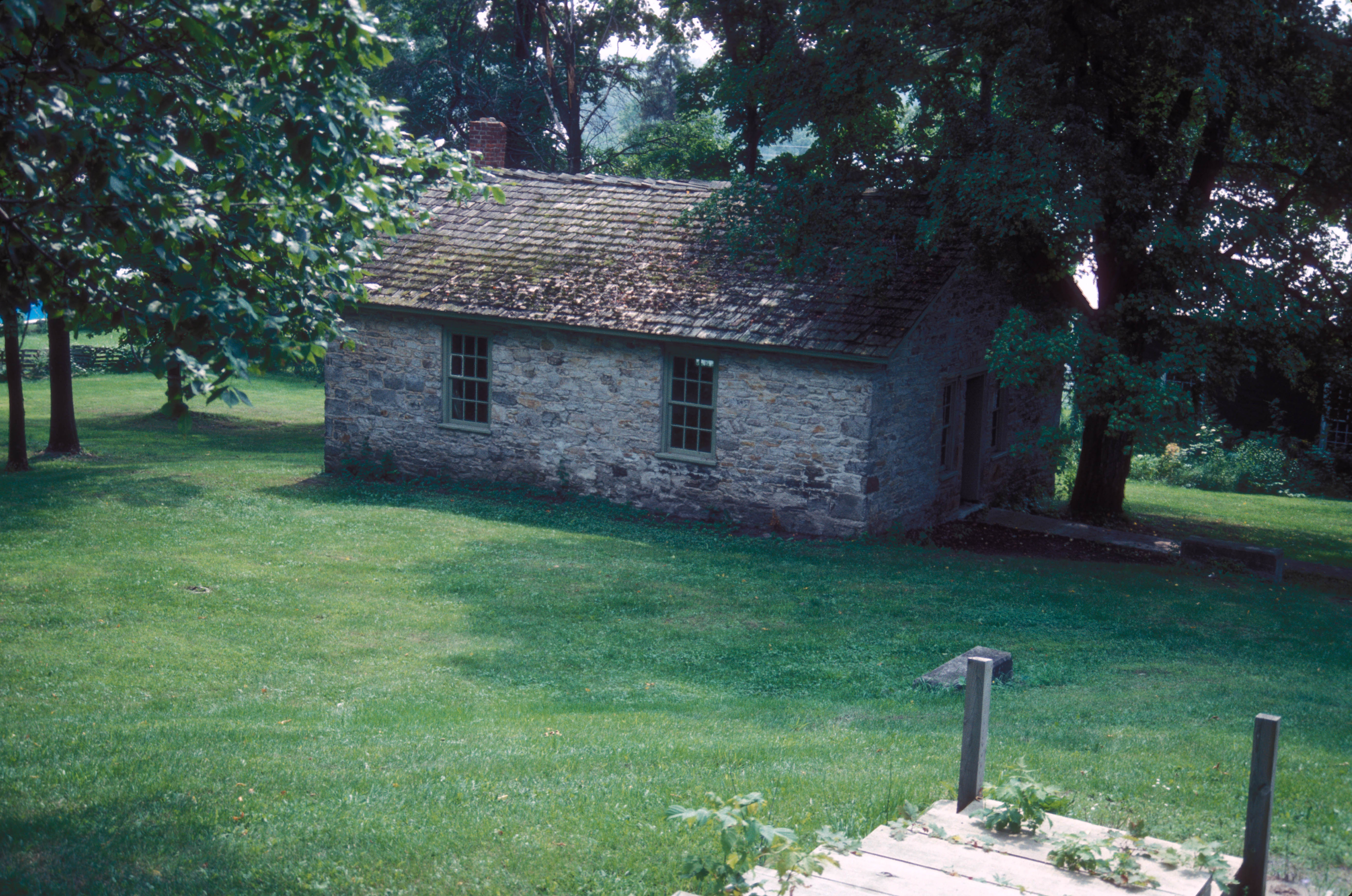

- Location within New York Location within the United States
- Location: Gouverneur St. Morristown, New York, U.S.
- Coordinates: 44°35′6″N 75°38′47″W
- Area: less than one acre
- Built: 1824
- MPS: Morristown Village MRA
- NRHP reference No.: 82004687
- Added to NRHP: September 2, 1982

Morristown Schoolhouse is a historic one-room school building located at Morristown in St. Lawrence County, New York. It was built about 1824 and is a one-story, small rectangular gable roofed limestone building. It was used as a school until 1877, then was village hall from 1899 and 1910. In 1976, it was renovated as a schoolhouse museum.

It was listed on the National Register of Historic Places in 1982.
