= Samuel Stocking House =

Historic house in New York, United States

- U.S. National Register of Historic Places
- Location within New York Location within the United States
- Location: 83 Gouveneur St. Morristown, New York, U.S.
- Coordinates: 44°35′18″N 75°38′53″W
- Area: less than one acre
- Built: 1821
- Architectural style: Greek Revival, Federal
- MPS: Morristown Village MRA
- NRHP reference No.: 82004688
- Added to NRHP: September 02, 1982

Samuel Stocking House is a historic home located at Morristown in St. Lawrence County, New York. It is a limestone 2 1/2-story rectangular structure with a 1 1/2-story wing. It features a hipped roof with balustraded deck. It was built about 1821 and possesses a combination of Federal and Greek Revival styles.

It was listed on the National Register of Historic Places in 1982.
