= Wright's Stone Store =

Historic commercial building in New York, United States

- U.S. National Register of Historic Places
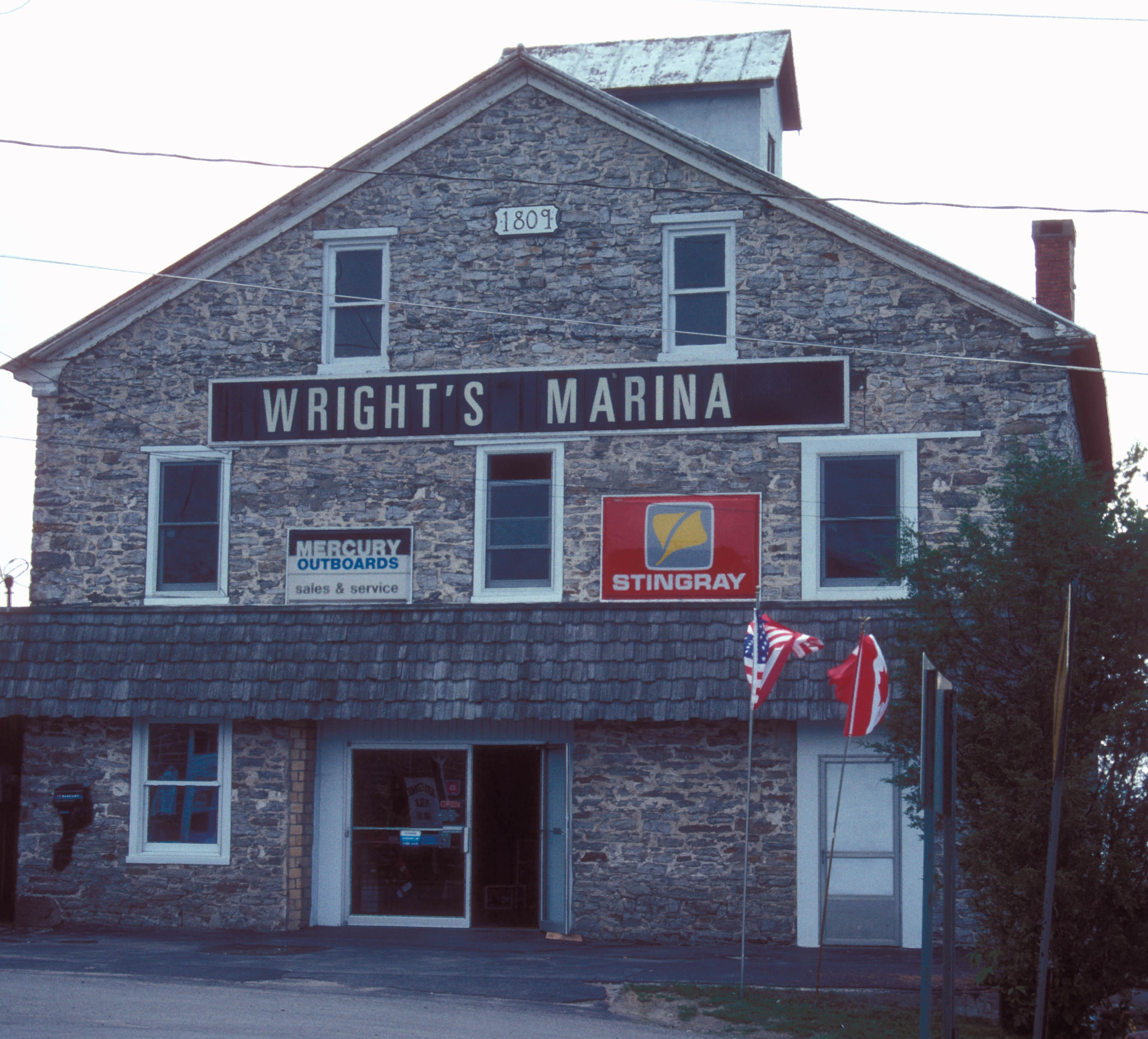

- Location within New York Location within the United States
- Location: Main St. Morristown, New York, U.S.
- Coordinates: 44°35′20″N 75°39′4″W
- Area: less than one acre
- Built: ca. 1821
- MPS: Morristown Village MRA
- NRHP reference No.: 82004691
- Added to NRHP: September 2, 1982

Wright's Stone Store is a historic store building located at Morristown in St. Lawrence County, New York. It is a 2 1/2-story building with an exposed basement built of local limestone about 1821. It is the earliest commercial structure in Morristown and served as a provisions store and community center until 1864.

It was listed on the National Register of Historic Places in 1982.
