= Severin Miller House =

Historic house in Iowa, United States

- U.S. National Register of Historic Places
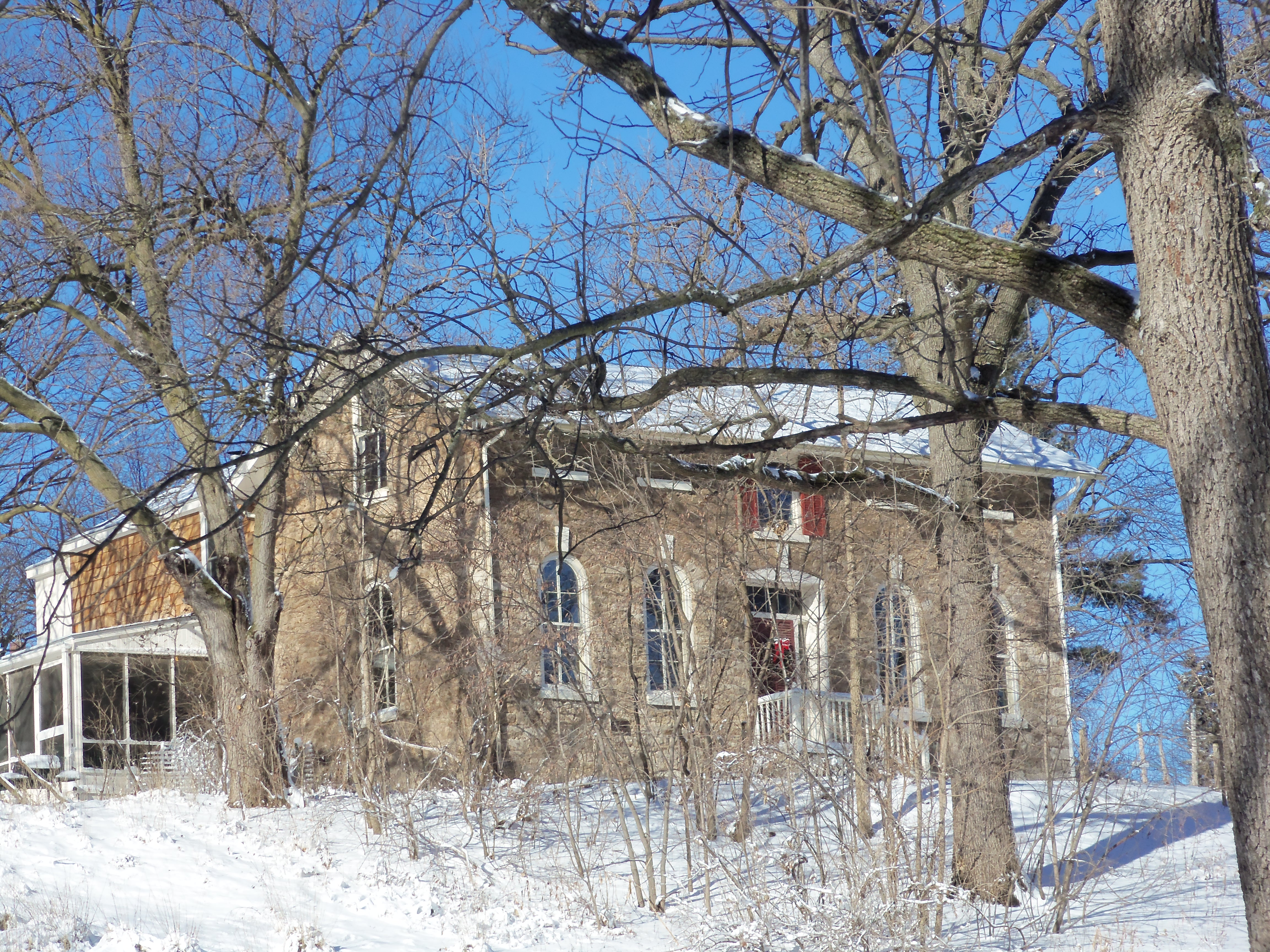

- Location within Iowa Location within the United States
- Location: 2200 Telegraph Rd. Davenport, Iowa
- Coordinates: 41°31′32″N 90°36′38″W
- Area: 1 acre (0.40 ha)
- Built: 1868
- MPS: Davenport MRA
- NRHP reference No.: 83002473
- Added to NRHP: July 7, 1983

The Severin Miller House and barn are historic buildings located in the West End of Davenport, Iowa, United States. They were listed together on the National Register of Historic Places in 1983.

== Severin Miller ==
Severin Miller was born in Prussia on October 17, 1824, the son of Bartholomew and Anna Marie Miller. He was raised and educated there, and learned the machinist trade from his father. In 1846 at the age of 22, he immigrated to the United States. He landed in New York City and initially settled in Philadelphia. He moved to St. Louis, Missouri and in 1850 he moved again to Davenport. He found work as a machinist in all these places. In 1852 he purchased property on the corner of Second and Gaines Streets. He returned to St. Louis briefly before returning to Davenport in 1857 when he built a shop and home on the property he bought in 1852. Miller mainly did repair work on farm equipment. His business expanded to the manufacture of pumps and a foundry. He sold the business in 1875.

In 1862 he married Christiania Baussmann and they raised four children. He built his home on Telegraph Road in 1868 in what was then a rural area outside of the city. The house remained with the Miller's daughters until they died in the mid-1940s.

== Architecture ==
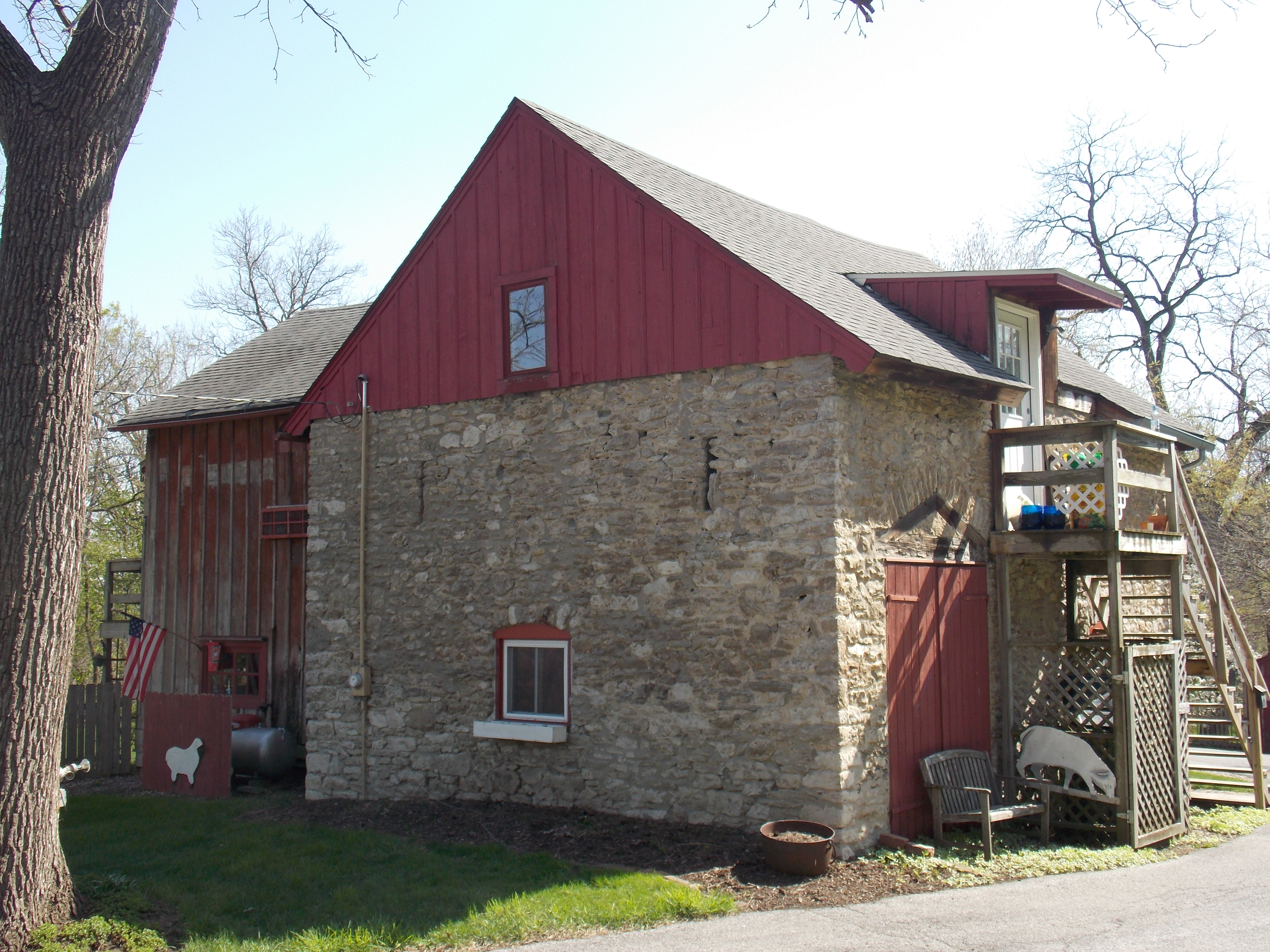
Barn

This house and the barn behind it are two of a very few vernacular stone structures that remain from Davenport's early decades. The house has a symmetrical five-bay front reminiscent of the Greek Revival style. The four round-arch windows all feature a keystone and above them are slabs that suggest sills of small attic windows that were never installed. The possible inspiration for the house was the architecture of Miller's native Prussia. There are plans for another wing, but they were abandoned when Christiania Miller died in 1871. The Miller Foundry produced the metal work used throughout the house. An addition was built on the back of the house sometime after 1982, which replaced a previous addition.

Behind the house sits a rubble stone barn. The structure is typical of barns found in the German communities in Pennsylvania and other eastern states. It features triangular, wood relieving arches and the gable ends covered with vertical wood planks.
