= Daniel Miller House =

Daniel Miller House may refer to:

- Daniel Miller House (Dayton, Ohio), listed on the National Register of Historic Places in Dayton, Ohio
- Daniel Miller House (West Lafayette, Ohio), listed on the National Register of Historic Places in Coshocton County, Ohio
