= Charles A. Miller House =

Historic house in Ohio, United States

- U.S. National Register of Historic Places
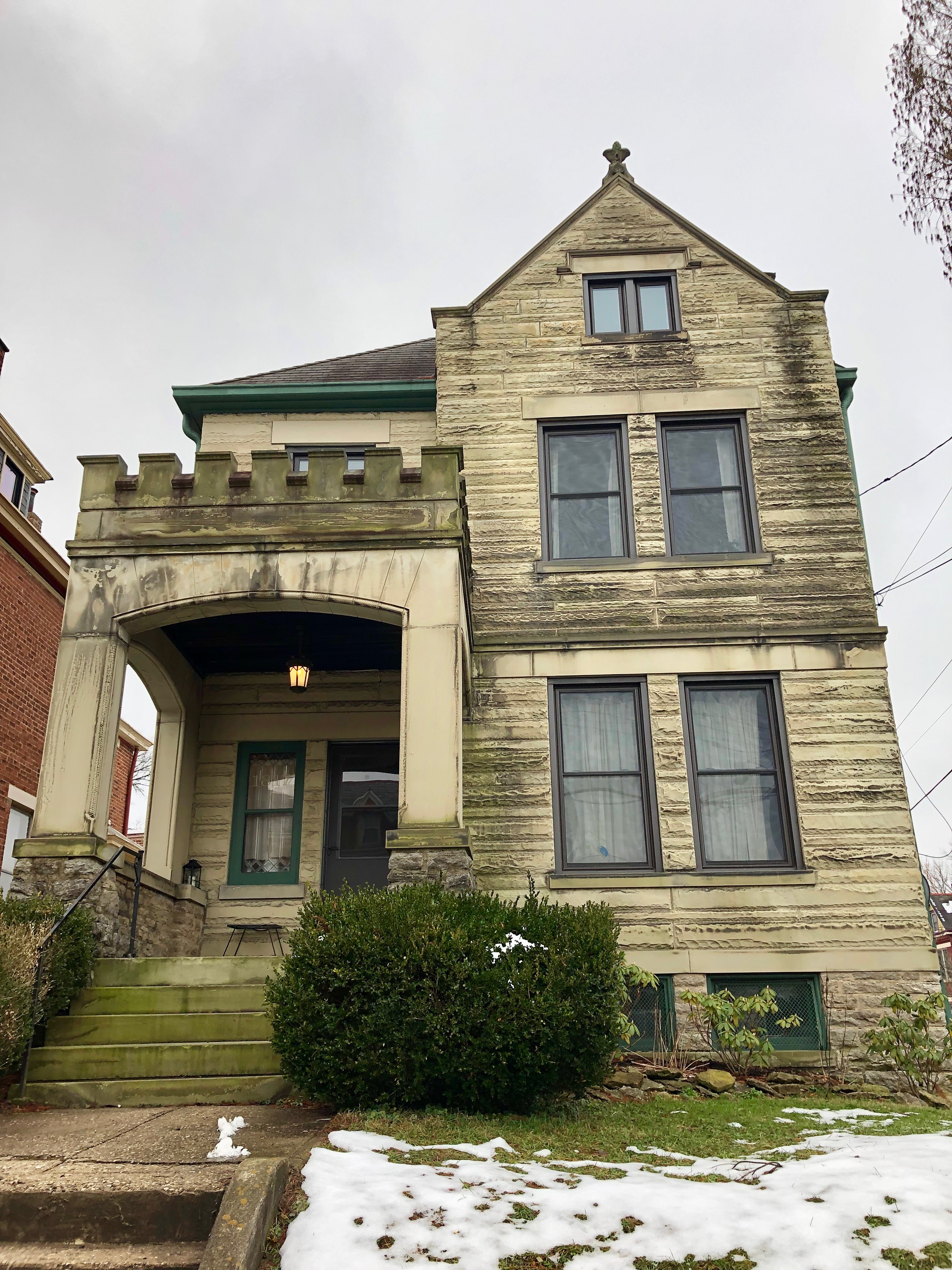
- Interactive map of Charles A. Miller House
- Location: 1817 Chase Ave., Cincinnati, Ohio
- Coordinates: 39.16451°N 84.54836°W
- Area: Less than 1 acre (0.40 ha)
- Built: 1890
- Architect: Samuel Hannaford & Sons
- Architectural style: Late Victorian, Victorian Eclectic
- MPS: Samuel Hannaford and Sons TR in Hamilton County
- NRHP reference No.: 80003064
- Added to NRHP: March 3, 1980

The Charles A. Miller House is a historic residence in Cincinnati, Ohio, United States. Built in 1890 according to a design by Samuel Hannaford, it is a two-and-a-half story building constructed in the Gothic Revival style. A brick and limestone structure with a slate roof, its facade is dominated by courses of ashlar, plus battlements at the top, and a prominent portico at the entrance. The floor plan is that of a rectangle, two bays wide and four bays deep; the right portion of the building features a gable, while the battlements appear primarily on the left side. Structurally, the house is supported by a post and lintel construction, with the exterior courses of stones forming the lintels as well as horizontal bands around the building.

== Charles Miller ==
Born in Portageville, New York in 1842, Charles Miller moved to Cincinnati and began an undertaking business there in 1866 after his service in the Union Army. By the last years of the 19th century, he had become prosperous enough to build the present house, which was constructed in 1890. He remained in business into the 20th century; in 1904, a city directory called him Cincinnati's oldest living funeral director.

Miller chose a prestigious architect to design his house: the firm of Samuel Hannaford. A native of England, Hannaford began a Cincinnati architectural practice in the late 1850s; by the end of the 19th century, he had developed a strong reputation for his designs for the city's social and political leaders, due largely to his attention to detail and his willingness to design buildings in a wide range of architectural styles. Four other Hannaford-designed houses built in Cincinnati between 1890 and 1892 are still standing; like the Miller house, all of them feature courses of ashlar on the facade, as do several Hannaford houses built at other times. Several of these early 1890s houses are built in an eclectic architectural style; among them is the Miller House, which features an eclectic form of the Victorian style.

== Recognition ==
In 1980, the Charles A. Miller House was listed on the National Register of Historic Places; it qualified for inclusion due to its well-preserved historic architecture. Nearly 40 other properties in Cincinnati and other parts of Hamilton County, including 14 other houses, were added to the Register at the same time as part of a multiple property submission of buildings designed by Samuel Hannaford and/or his sons. The Miller House is significantly newer than some of the houses included in this group, for the oldest of Hannaford's residential designs in the city was constructed in 1862.
