= Isaac Miller House =

Historic house in Missouri, United States

- U.S. National Register of Historic Places
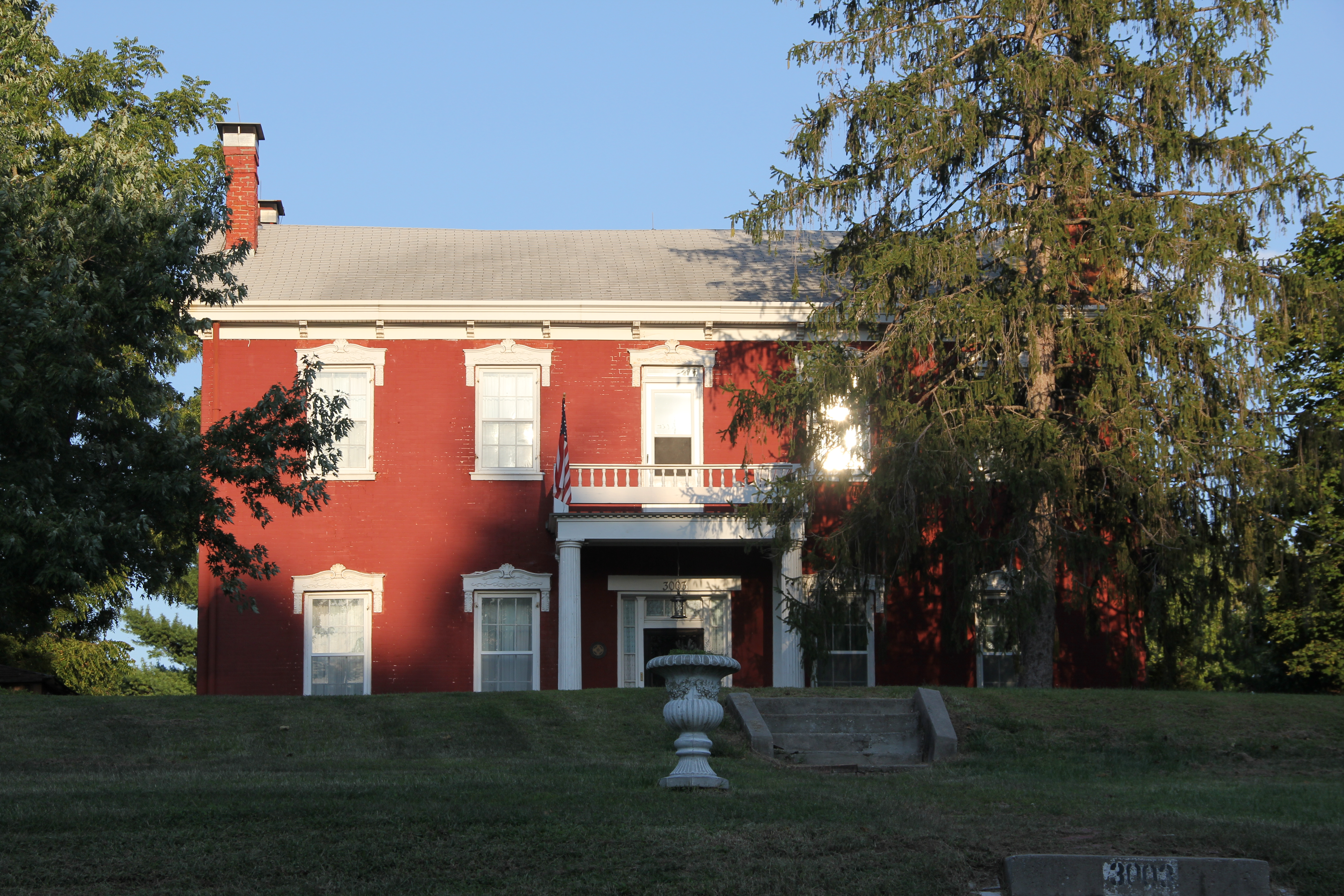

- Location within Missouri Location within the United States
- Location: 3003 Ashland Ave., St. Joseph, Missouri
- Coordinates: 39°47′46″N 94°49′4″W
- Area: less than one acre
- Built: 1859
- Architect: William Blair
- Architectural style: Classical Revival
- NRHP reference No.: 80002320
- Added to NRHP: September 17, 1980

The Isaac Miller House, also known as the Miller House, is a historic home located at St. Joseph, Missouri. It was built in 1859, and is a two-story, Classical Revival-style brick dwelling.

It was listed on the National Register of Historic Places in 1980.
