= Samuel Miller House =

Historic house in Virginia, United States

- U.S. National Register of Historic Places
- Virginia Landmarks Register
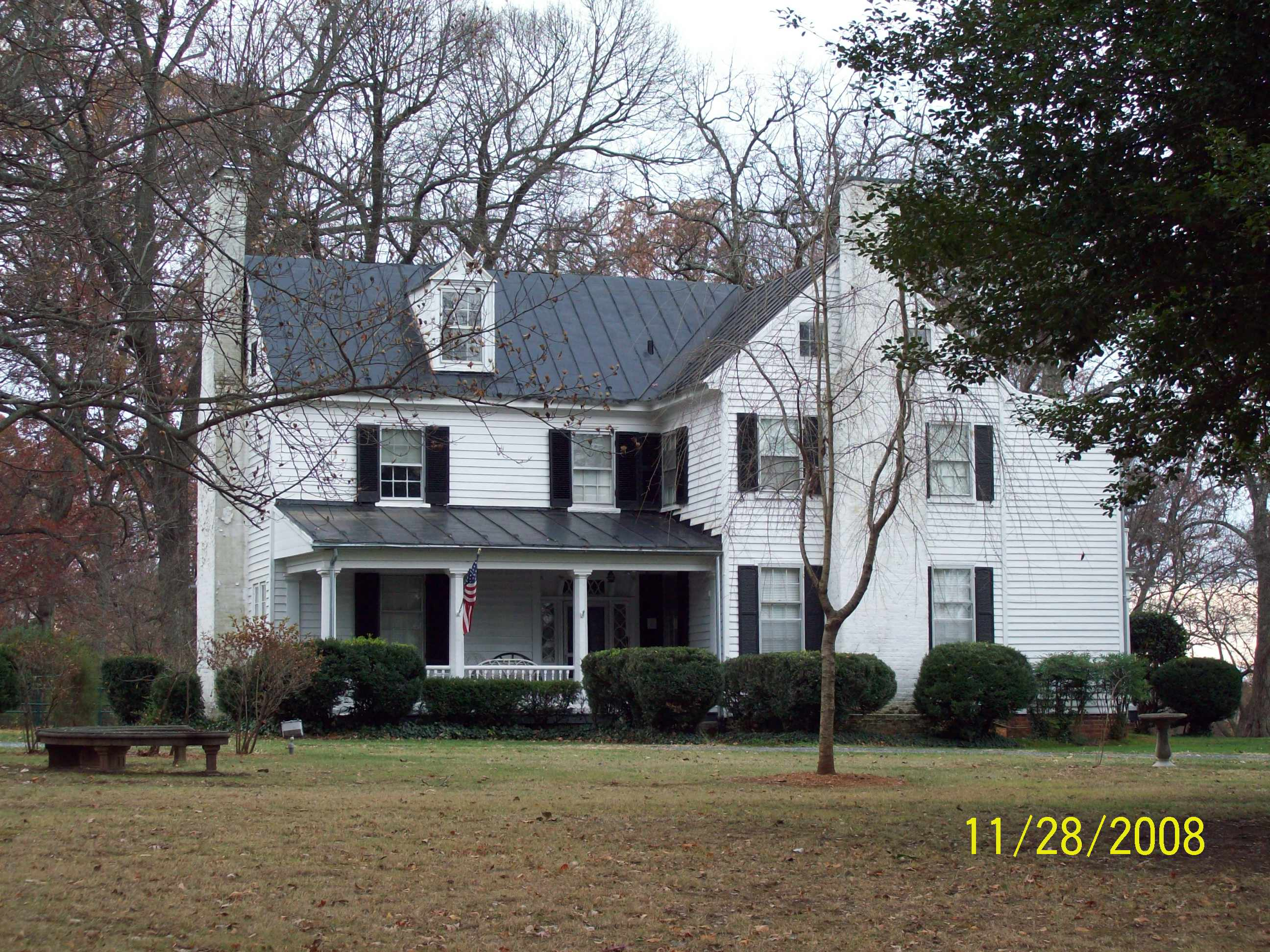
- Samuel Miller House, Lynchburg VA, November 2008

- Location within Virginia Location within the United States
- Location: 1433 Nelson Dr., Lynchburg, Virginia
- Coordinates: 37°21′57″N 79°12′47″W
- Area: 3.9 acres (1.6 ha)
- Architectural style: Federal
- NRHP reference No.: 92001579
- VLR No.: 118-0223

Significant dates
- Added to NRHP: November 12, 1992
- Designated VLR: September 15, 1992

The Samuel Miller House is a historic home located at Lynchburg, Virginia, United States. It is associated with Samuel Miller (1792-1869), a successful businessman and investor who was among the wealthiest men in the South during the years preceding the American Civil War. It is a large frame house erected between 1826 and 1829, and expanded and modified numerous times through the 20th century. Outbuildings consist of a cottage, stable, woodshed, and garage. The surrounding property was contested terrain during the siege of Lynchburg (June 1864), when a cavalry skirmish occurred on the property.

It was listed on the National Register of Historic Places in 1992.
