= Miller–O'Donnell House =

- U.S. National Register of Historic Places
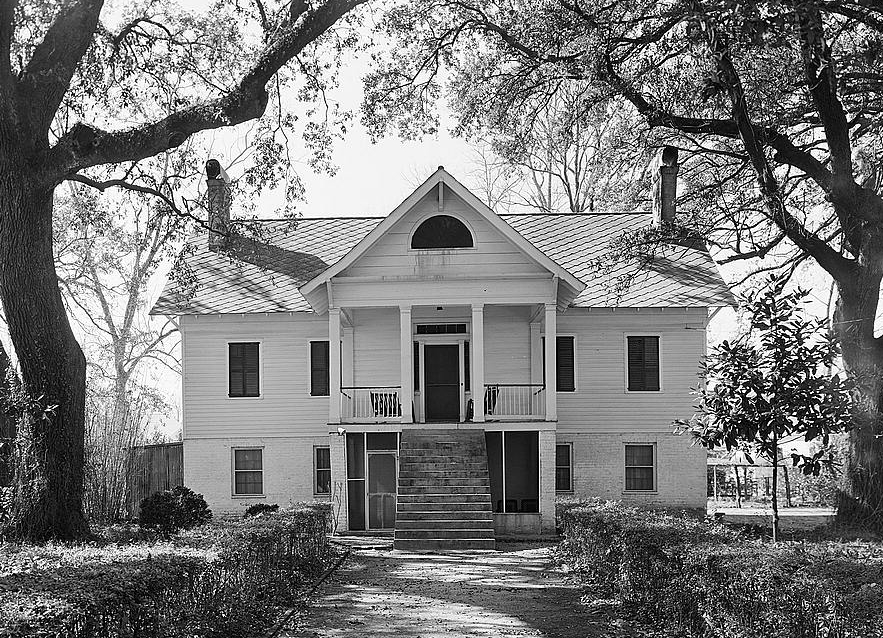
- Miller–O'Donnell House as photographed by the HABS in 1963

- Location within Mobile, Alabama Location within Alabama Location within the United States
- Location: 1102 Broad Street; Mobile, Alabama
- Coordinates: 30°39′52″N 88°3′25″W
- Built: 1837
- Architectural style: Gulf Coast cottage
- NRHP reference No.: 82002060
- Added to NRHP: February 19, 1982

The Miller–O'Donnell House was a historic residence in Mobile, Alabama. The two-story house was built in 1837 in the Gulf Coast Cottage style. It featured a masonry brick ground floor with a wood-frame main floor above. It was placed on the National Register of Historic Places on February 19, 1982, but has since been destroyed.
