= Thomas Miller House =

Historic building in Ohio, US

- U.S. National Register of Historic Places
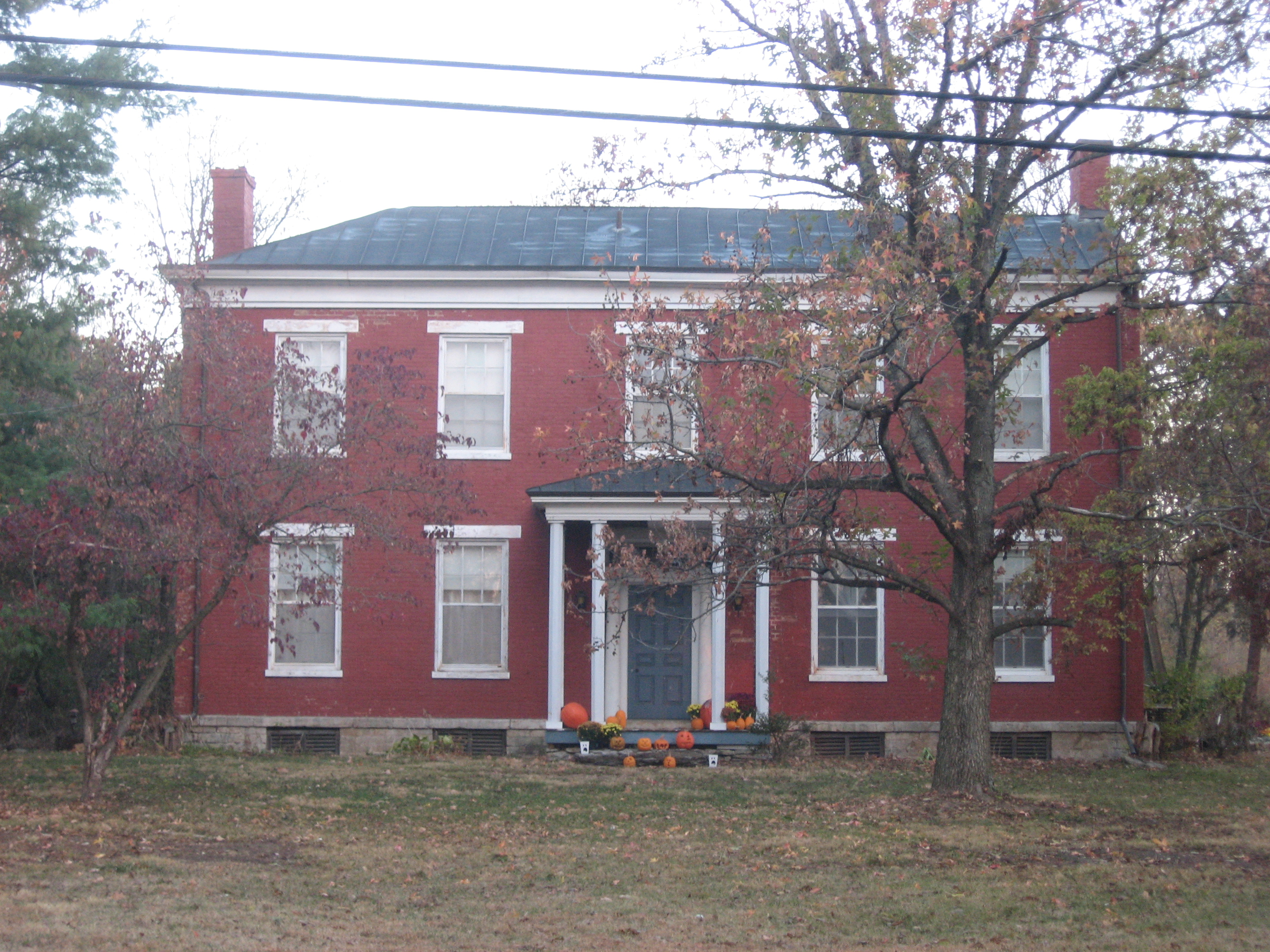
- Front of the house

- Location within Ohio Location within the United States
- Nearest city: Elizabethtown, Ohio
- Coordinates: 39°9′6.94″N 84°48′50.69″W
- Architectural style: Greek Revival
- NRHP reference No.: 00001294
- Added to NRHP: November 2, 2000

Thomas Miller House is a registered historic building near Elizabethtown, Ohio, listed in the National Register on November 2, 2000.

== Historic uses ==
- Single Dwelling
- Agricultural Outbuildings
