= Jacques Cartier State Park =

State park in St. Lawrence County, New York

- Location within New York
- Type: State park
- Location: Route 12; Morristown, New York
- Coordinates: 44°33′18″N 75°40′48″W
- Area: 461 acres (1.87 km^{2})
- Operator: New York State Office of Parks, Recreation and Historic Preservation
- Visitors: 22,022 (in 2014)
- Open: All year
- Website: Jacques Cartier State Park

Jacques Cartier State Park is a 461-acre (1.87 km^{2}) state park located in the Town of Morristown in St. Lawrence County, New York. The park is located on the south bank of the St. Lawrence River.

The park offers a beach, picnic tables, playground, hiking, fishing, a boat launch and docks. The park also features a campground with both tent and trailer sites, including bathroom facilities and showers. Cross-country skiing and ice-fishing is permitted during the winter, and seasonal waterfowl and deer hunting is allowed with permits.

== See also ==
- List of New York state parks
