= George Miller House =

George Miller House may refer to:

- George H. Miller House, Bloomington, Illinois, listed on the National Register of Historic Places (NRHP)
- George Miller House (Peewee Valley, Kentucky), NRHP-listed in Oldham County, Kentucky
- George Tambling Miller and Ninette Stocker Miller House, Hillsboro, New Mexico, listed on the National Register of Historic Places (NRHP)
- George Miller House (Stehekin, Washington), Stehekin, Washington, listed on the National Register of Historic Places (NRHP)
