= Paschal Miller House =

Historic house in New York, United States

- U.S. National Register of Historic Places
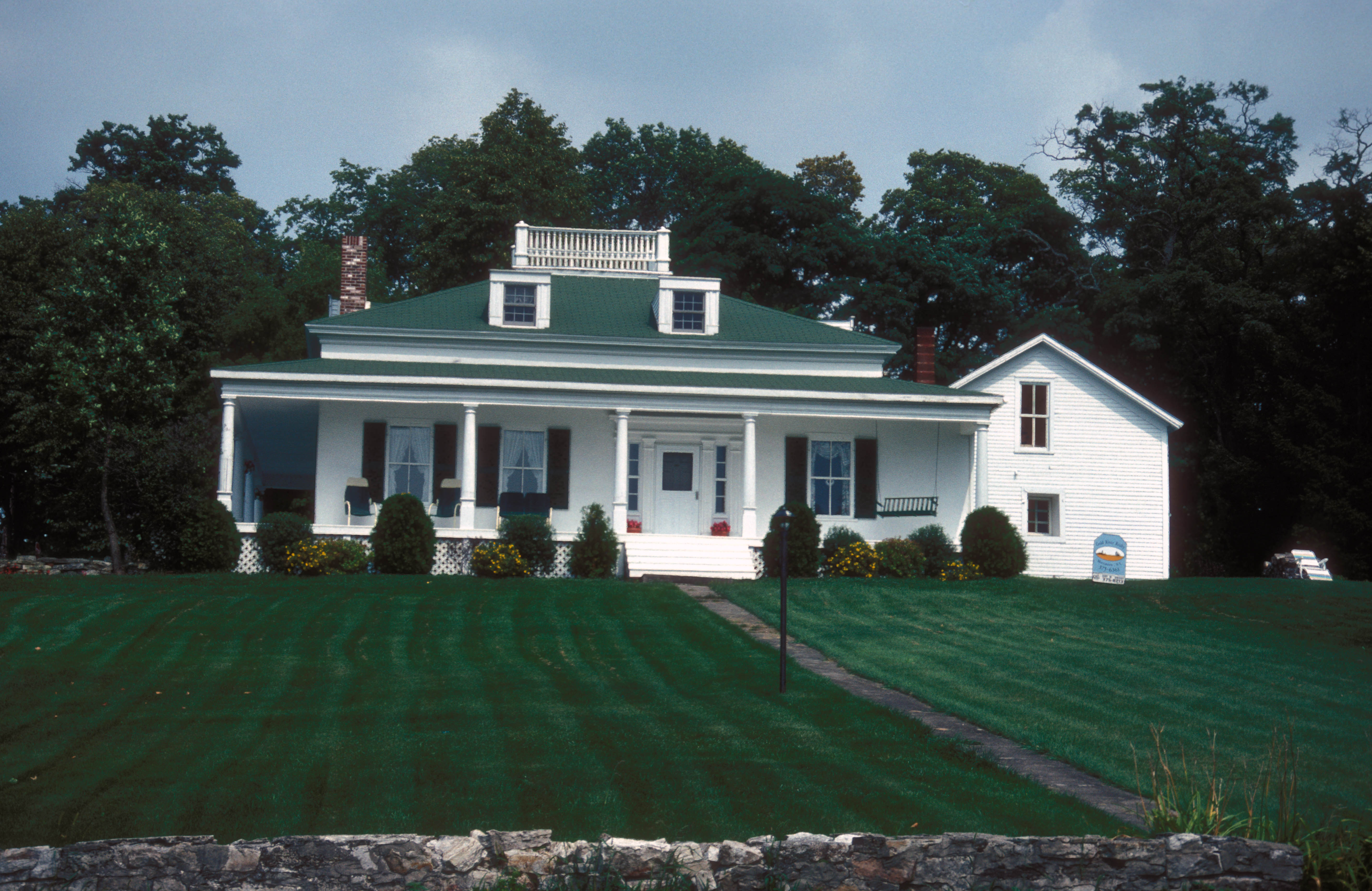

- Location within New York Location within the United States
- Location: Main and Gouveneur Sts. Morristown, New York, U.S.
- Coordinates: 44°35′16″N 75°38′57″W
- Area: less than one acre
- Built: 1838
- Architectural style: Greek Revival
- MPS: Morristown Village MRA
- NRHP reference No.: 82004686
- Added to NRHP: September 2, 1982

Paschal Miller House is a historic home located at Morristown in St. Lawrence County, New York. It is a 1 1/2-story rectangular frame structure with a hipped roof, built in 1838–1843 in the Greek Revival style. The house features a wraparound porch along three sides. Also on the property is a contributing carriage barn.

It was listed on the National Register of Historic Places in 1982.
