= Miller Farmstead (La Crosse, Kansas) =

- U.S. National Register of Historic Places
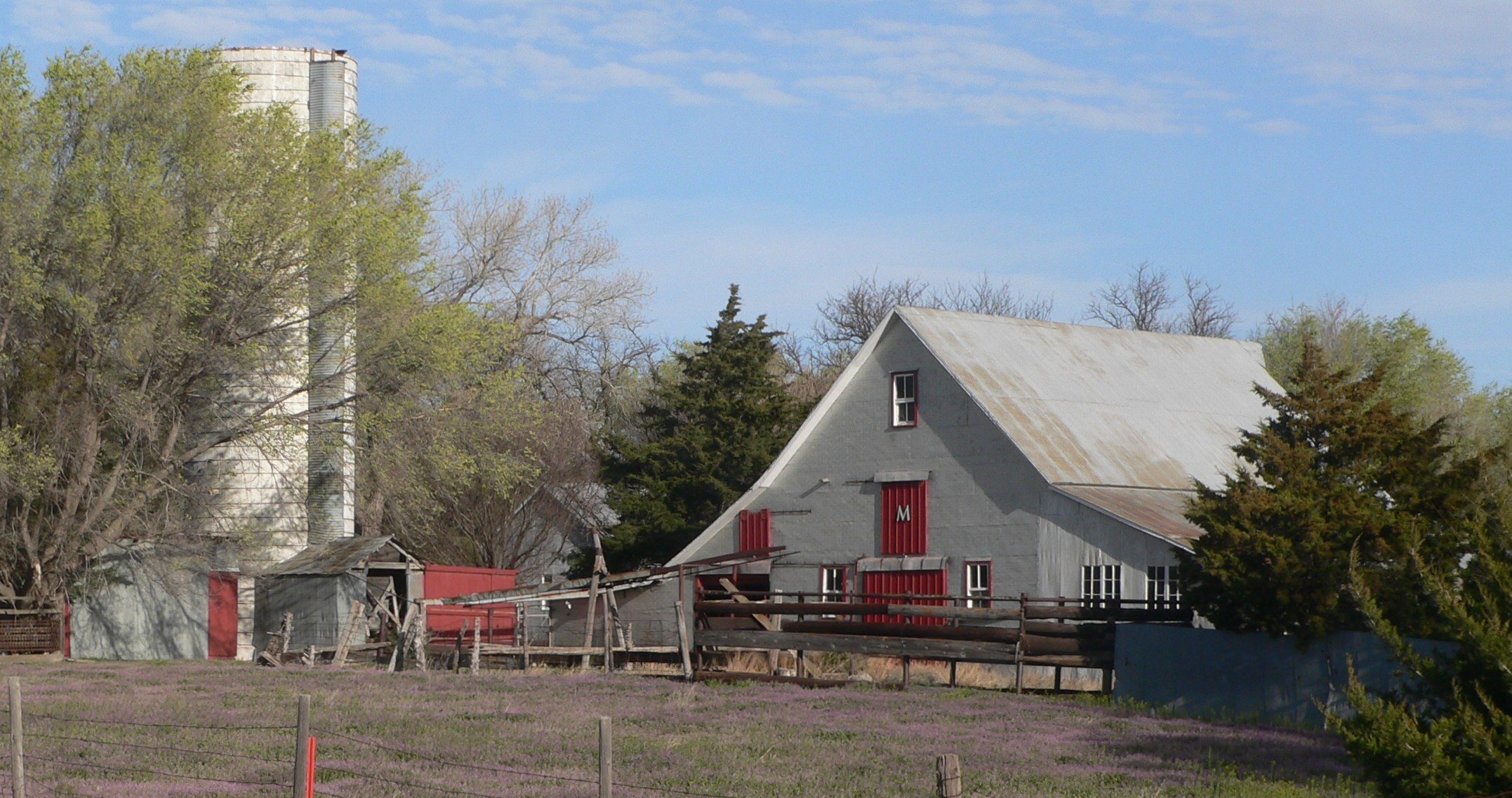

- Location within Kansas Location within the United States
- Nearest city: La Crosse, Kansas
- Coordinates: 38.5386°N 99.2328°W
- Area: 4.2 acres (1.7 ha)
- Built: 1881
- Architectural style: Midweast Prairie Barn
- MPS: Agriculture-Related Resources of Kansas
- NRHP reference No.: 12000869
- Added to NRHP: October 17, 2012

The Miller Farmstead near La Crosse, Kansas in Rush County, Kansas was established in 1880–1881. It was listed on the National Register of Historic Places in 2012.

It was established east of La Crosse in 1881.

Austrian immigrant Frank Miller and wife Emma homesteaded a 160 acres (0.65 km^{2}) property under the Homestead Act of 1862 and an additional area of the same size under the Timber Culture Act of 1873. (Note: The nomination apparently misstates the latter as the "Timber Claim Act of 1863".) They were required to plant 10 acres (0.040 km^{2}) of timber which they did.

Its cluster of buildings on 4.3 acres (1.7 ha) was nominated for National Register listing in 2012. For a homestead listing, it was unusual that the farm had so many buildings and structures, 19 in total (11 deemed contributing), as none had ever been removed in the farm's history. The buildings and structures were varied in their construction, and had exteriors that were stone, wood, hollow clay tile, metal and vinyl.

The original house built in 1880-81 and later modified was deemed non-contributing due to addition of non-historic vinyl siding, but it was noted it might later be recognized as contributing if the siding was removed.

It is located at 2913 Kansas Highway 4, on the north side of the highway.
