= Edward Miller House =

Historic house in Massachusetts, United States

- U.S. National Register of Historic Places
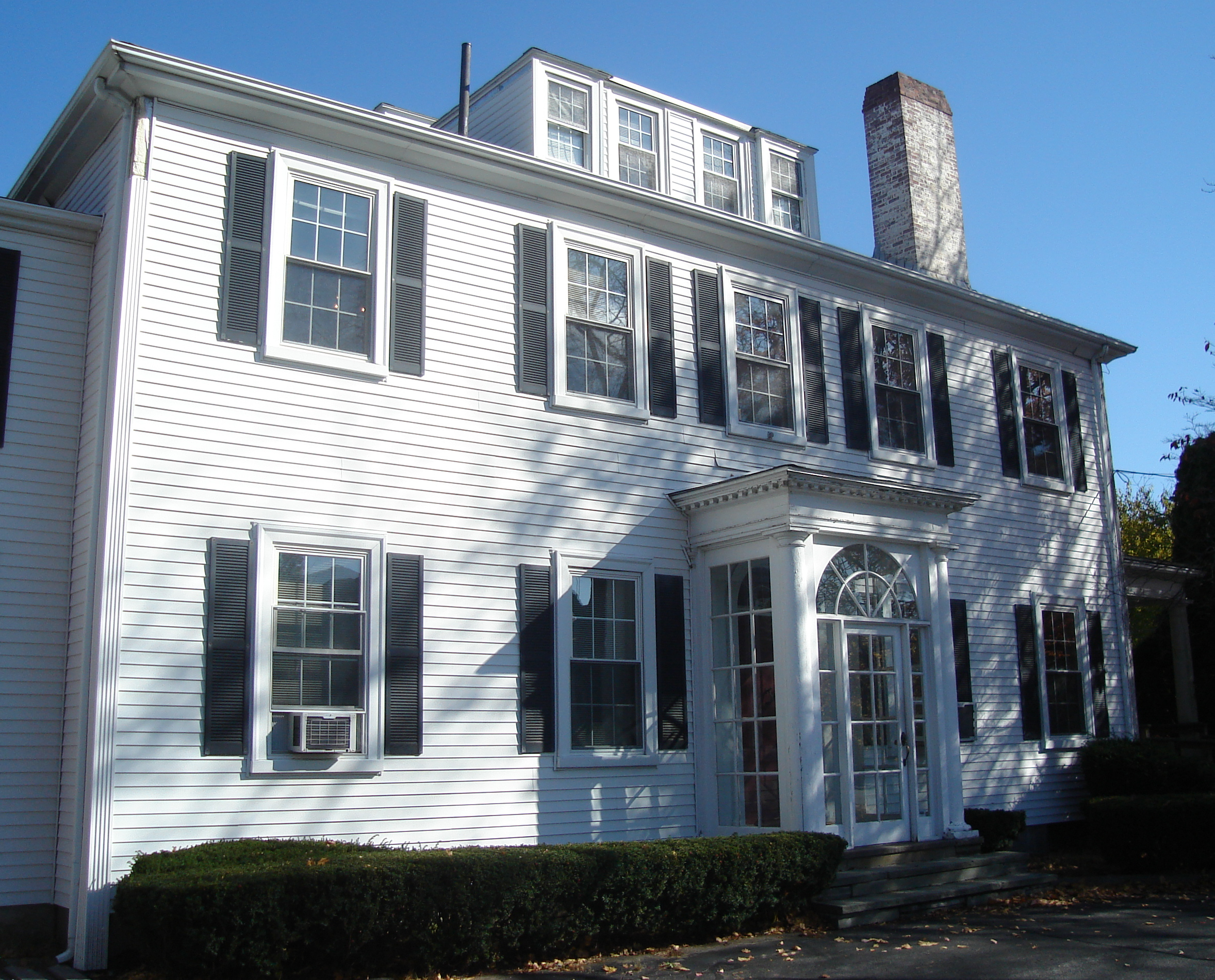
- Edward Miller House

- Location within Massachusetts Location within the United States
- Location: 36 Miller Stile Rd., Quincy, Massachusetts
- Coordinates: 42°14′59″N 70°59′59″W
- Built: 1830
- Architectural style: Federal
- MPS: Quincy MRA
- NRHP reference No.: 89001358
- Added to NRHP: March 08, 1990

The Edward Miller House is a historic house at 36 Miller Stile Road in Quincy, Massachusetts. This two-story wood-frame house was built in the 1830s by Edward Miller, a local veteran of the American Revolutionary War. The house is a well-preserved Federal style structure, despite having experienced significant alterations c. 1912, when it was used as an inn, and in 1960, when it housed the offices of the South Shore Chamber of Commerce.

The house was listed on the National Register of Historic Places in 1990.

== See also ==
- National Register of Historic Places listings in Quincy, Massachusetts
