= McConnell's Windmill =

- Stone Windmill
- U.S. National Register of Historic Places
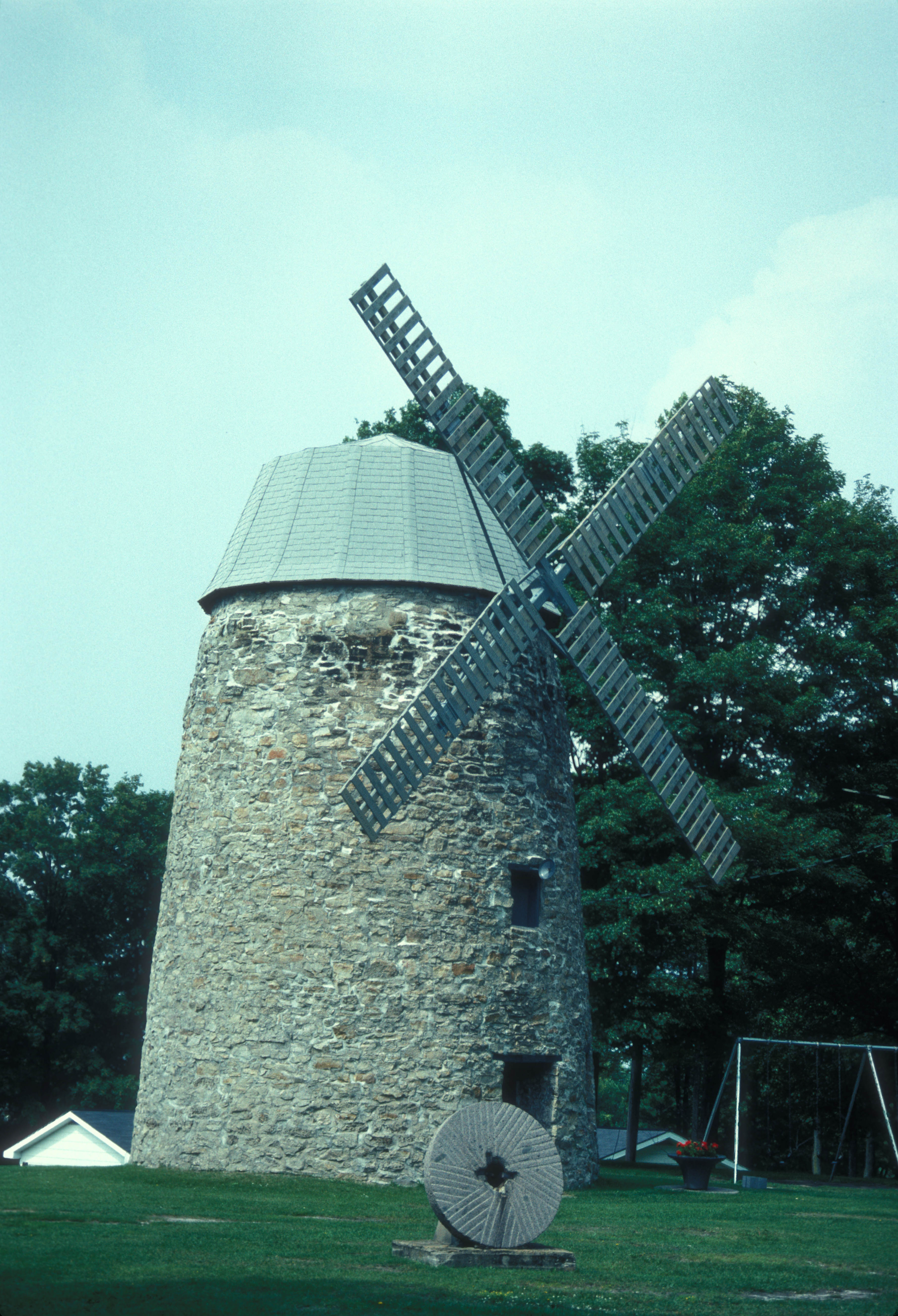

- Location within New York Location within the United States
- Location: Morris St., Morristown, New York, USA
- Coordinates: 44°35′22″N 75°38′42″W
- Area: 1.5 acres (0.61 ha)
- Built: 1825
- Built by: McConnell, Hugh
- MPS: Morristown Village MRA
- NRHP reference No.: 82004689
- Added to NRHP: September 2, 1982

McConnell's Windmill, also known as Morristown Windmill and Stone Windmill, is a stone windmill in Morristown, New York. It was built in 1825, and is a coursed rubble stone structure measuring 40 feet tall and 77 feet in circumference. It was used as a grist mill. The building has been used as a jail and as an Air Warning System Observation Post (N. 69 c) during World War II. It is the only windmill on the American side of the St. Lawrence Valley.

It was listed on the National Register of Historic Places in 1982.
