= Miller's House at Red Mills =

Historic house in New York, United States

- Bruyn Estate at Red Mills Farm (Historic Farmhouse & Guest House)
- U.S. National Register of Historic Places
- Location within New York Location within the United States
- Location: 1017 Bruyn Tpke, Pine Bush, NY 12566; Red Mills Rd. and Wallkill Ave., Shawangunk, New York
- Coordinates: 41°37′42″N 74°16′29″W
- Area: 9.023 acres (3.651 ha)
- Built: 1835
- Built by: Roe and Arminda Coleman,
- Architectural style: Greek Revival
- MPS: Shawangunk Valley MRA
- NRHP reference No.: 83001819
- Added to NRHP: September 26, 1983

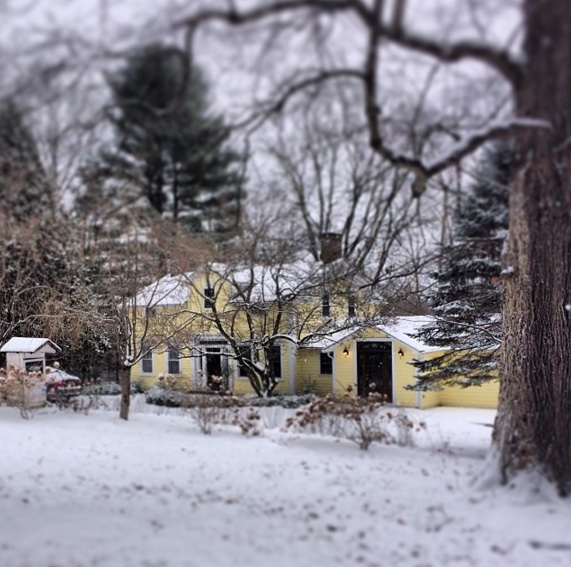
Bruyn Estate at Red Mills Farm (Historic Farmhouse & Guest House) Winter

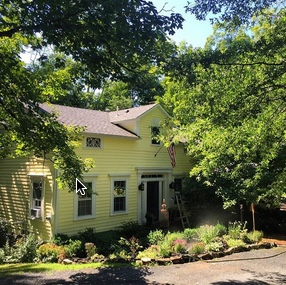
Bruyn Estate at Red Mills Farm (Historic Farmhouse & Guest House) Summer

Bruyn Estate at Red Mills Farm (Historic Farmhouse & Guest House) or "Miller's House at Red Mills Farm" is a historic estate and farm located in Shawangunk in Ulster County, New York. Situated on just under 25 acres, Bruyn Estate has two residential dwellings totaling eight bedrooms. One 1835 Greek Revival farmhouse on the National Register, and one newly-built log home. It is on the east side of the Shawangunk Kill at the Ulster/Orange Counties line. Wallkill Avenue is north of the building with the Shawangunk Kill east of it.

Bruyn Estate is a working farm with alpacas, goats, and chickens on the grounds.

The one half story frame farmhouse with a partially exposed cellar and interior end chimneys was constructed c.1835 on a site overlooking the Shawangunk Kill. The northwest facade of the five-bay center hall structure has 6/6 sashes with plain window heads and sills. The center entry, framed by pilasters which support a full entablature, has three-paned sidelights. Complete with 3BRs upstairs, formal dining, kitchen and office on the first floor, and a karaoke lounge, gym and wine cellar in the basement.

Bruyn Estate at Red Mills Farm (Historic Farmhouse) is significant as a distinctive example of Greek Revival style architecture. It is also significant as a surviving component of an industrial complex originating in the eighteenth century. The architectural integrity of the house is embodied in its form, original materials, unique iron grill work, elaborate interior woodwork and door moldings.

The farmhouse at Red Mills known as 'Red Mills Farm' was built c.1835 by Roe and Arminda Coleman on this site overlooking the Shawangunk Kill. The early mill site included a sawmill and gristmill which were in proximity to the miller's house (only the miller's house survives). The location allowed the miller a view of mill operations, and the height of the water in the mill could also be monitored. The sawmill and gristmill were destroyed by fire in the mid-twentieth century, leaving only remnants of a dam and mill race channel, and the existing miller's house. (The mill site is located on a separate parcel.)

The site was originally owned by Abraham Jansen. Roe Coleman purchased the land in 1835 and began construction of the mill buildings and the house. (A date stone set in the garden wall which surrounds the house reads, 'Erected by M. Webb / July 4, 1839'. This may refer to the date the wall was constructed since it does not relate to the house or it may have come from one of the other mill buildings. No documentation has been found to link M. Webb with the site, however.)

The site is known as 'Red Mills' and this name has been attributed to the color of the mill buildings. It has also been called 'Green Mills', presumably after a subsequent owner, Russell G. Green.

Also on the property is a contributing well.

The property is currently owned by AJPA, LLC.

It was listed on the National Register of Historic Places in 1983.
