= The William Miller House =

Coordinates: 37°32′49.3″N 77°27′22.8″W

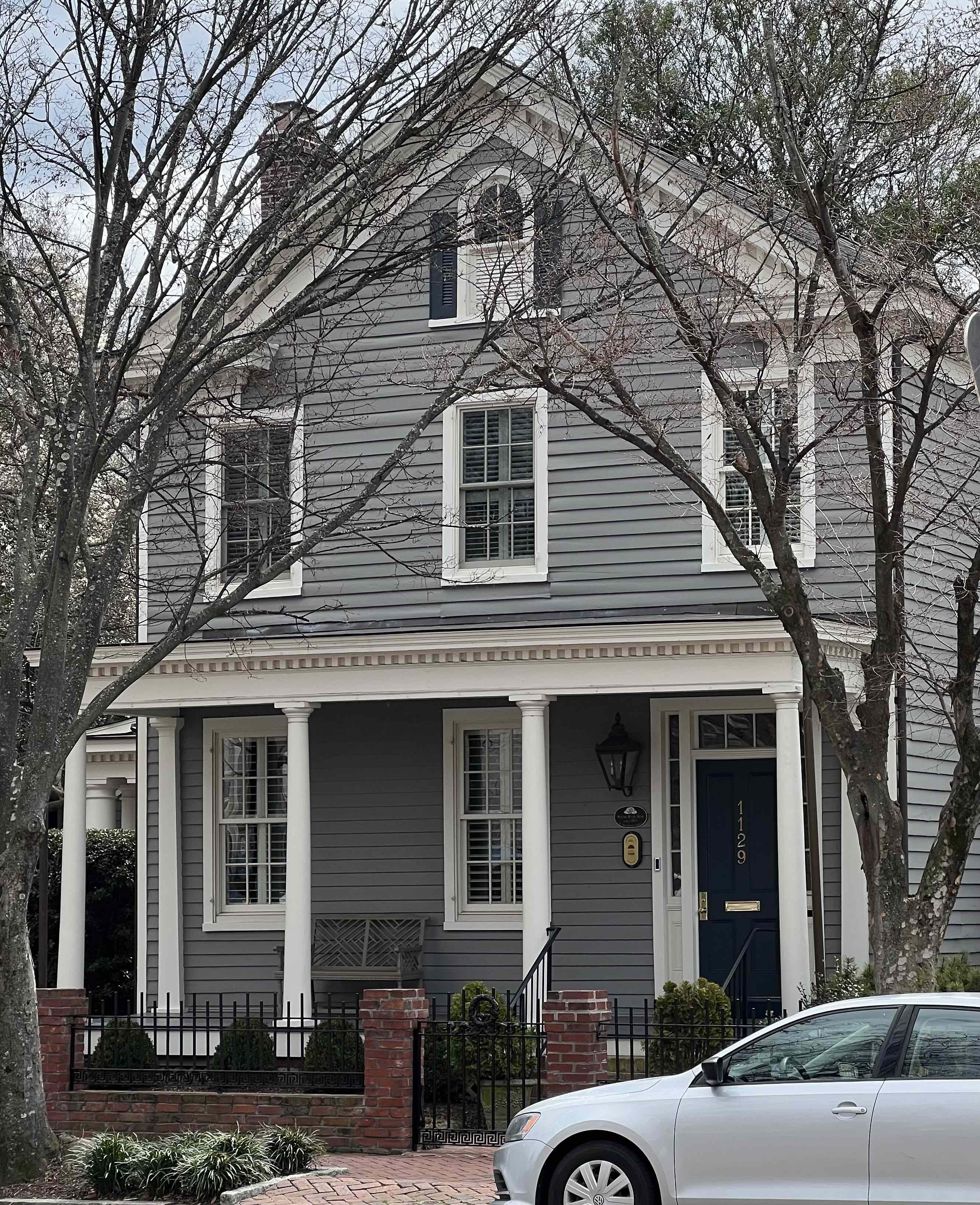
- Interactive map of the The William Miller House area

General information
- Location: Richmond, Virginia, U.S.

The William Miller House is a historic home in Richmond, Virginia that was most recently a two-room bed and breakfast before again becoming a private residence.

== History ==
The historic William Miller House Bed and Breakfast is located in Virginia's Historic Fan District. The home was built by William Miller in 1869 after the American Civil War. William Miller worked as a proprietor for Rogers & Miller Marbleworks and the inn includes three marble mantels that were originally constructed in 1869.

== The Locale ==
The William Miller house is located in the center of the Fan District was named after the configuration of streets that fan out from Belvidere Street. The Historic Fan District was added to the National Register of Historic Places in 1985 and the boundary was extended in 1986. Located nearby is Virginia Commonwealth University and a number of local restaurants, cafes, and museums.

== See also ==
- Historic
- Richmond, Virginia
- Bed and breakfast
- National Register of Historic Places
