= William Davis Miller House =

Historic house in Rhode Island, United States

- U.S. National Register of Historic Places
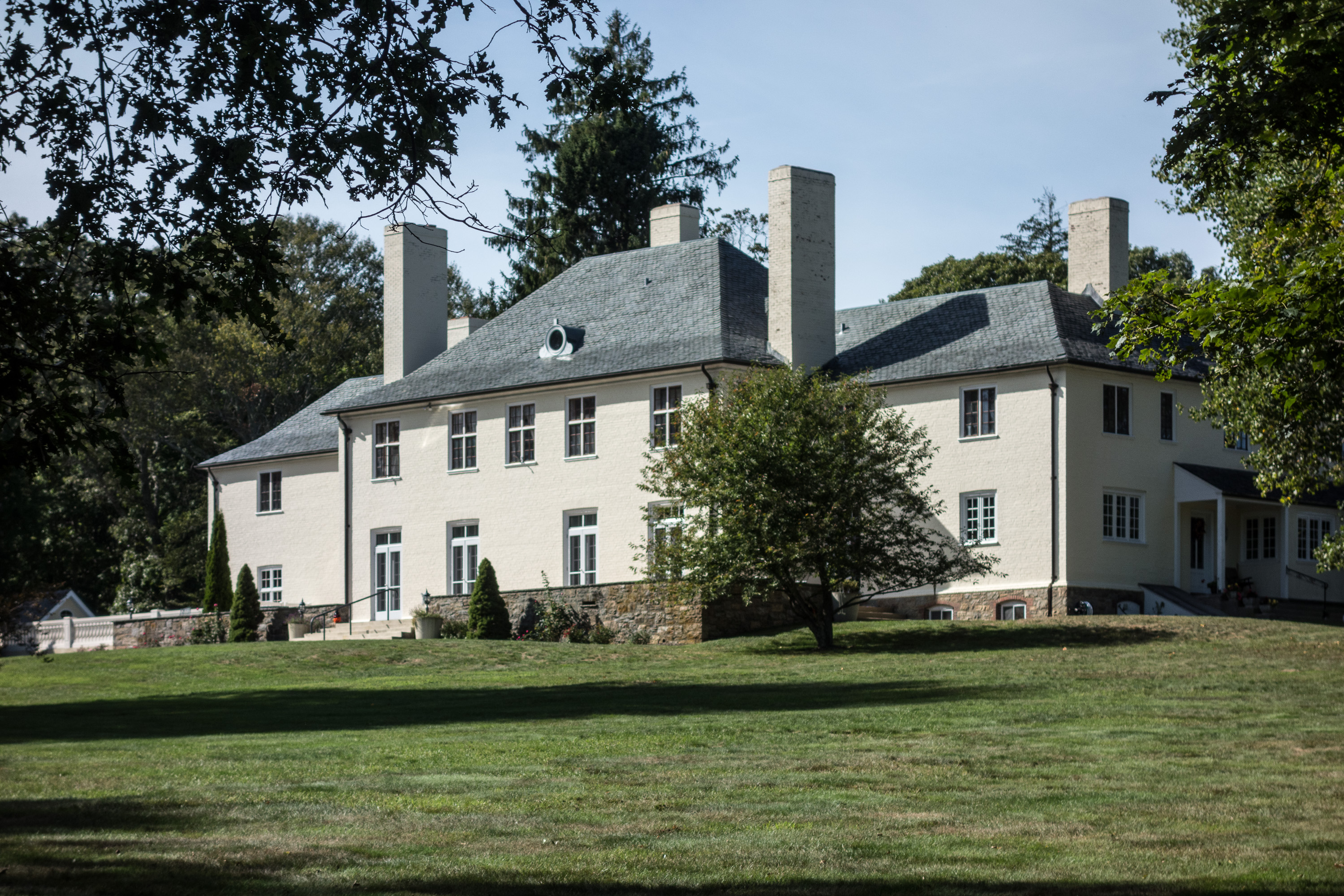

- Location within Rhode Island Location within the United States
- Location: 130 Main Street, Wakefield, Rhode Island
- Coordinates: 41°26′8″N 71°30′27″W
- Area: 10.7 acres (4.3 ha)
- Built: 1934
- Architect: Albert Harkness
- Architectural style: Colonial Revival
- NRHP reference No.: 85000627
- Added to NRHP: March 21, 1985

The William Davis Miller House also known as the Wakefield Mansion is a historic estate in the Wakefield village of South Kingstown, Rhode Island. The estate consists of 10.7 acres (4.3 ha) of land, on which stand a substantial house, garage and water tank, all built in the mid-1930s. The property was designed by Providence architect Albert Harkness and built for William Davis Miller and Mary (Chew) Miller. Miller was a social and civic force in Providence, serving as a trustee of Brown University, the Providence Public Libraries, and as president of the Rhode Island Historical Society, and was a longtime friend of Harkness. The Colonial Revival estate Harkness designed for the Millers typifies the type of country estates that were built in Rhode Island in the period.

The estate was listed on the National Register of Historic Places in 1985.

The property was placed for sale in 2012, at which time the address was listed as 571 Main Street.

In 2014, a proposal was brought to the South Kingstown Planning Board to convert the Miller property, along with other adjacent properties, to a 48-unit multi-household development. The redevelopment proposal was denied in October 2014.

The property is currently owned by Roland J. Fiore, owner of South County Sand and Gravel.

== See also ==
- National Register of Historic Places listings in Washington County, Rhode Island
