= Morristown, New York =

Morristown
- Town
- Town of Morristown
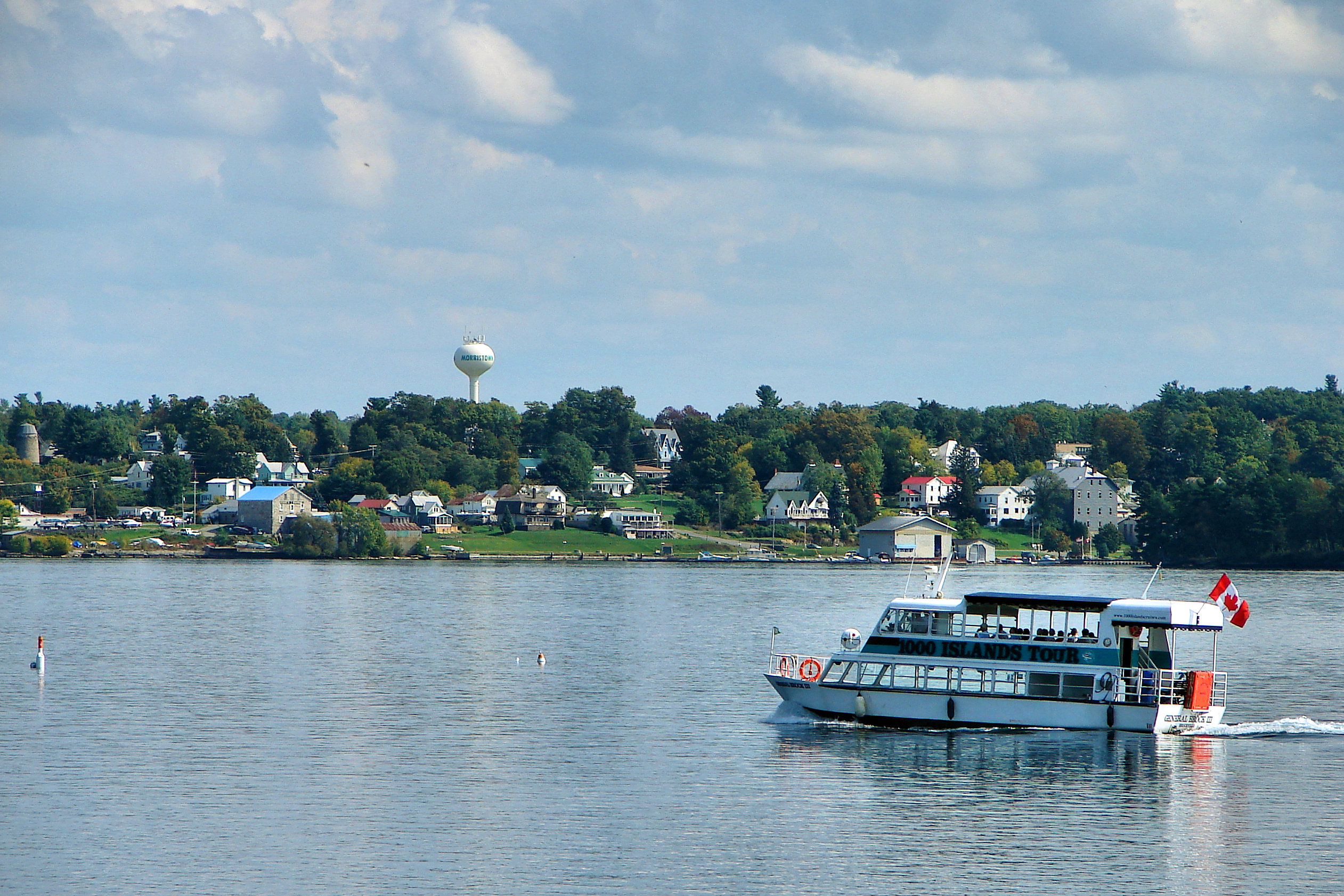
- Morristown as seen across the St. Lawrence River

- Location in the United States Morristown (the United States)
- Coordinates: 44°35′11″N 75°38′54″W
- Country: United States
- State: New York
- County: St. Lawrence
- Settled: Circa 1808
- Established: 1821
- Named for: Gouverneur Morris

Area
  - Total: 59.4 sq mi (154 km^{2})
  - Land: 45.9 sq mi (119 km^{2})
  - Water: 13.6 sq mi (35 km^{2})

Population (2020)
  - Total: 2,082
- Time zone: UTC-5 (Eastern (EST))
  - Summer (DST): UTC-4 (EDT)
- ZIP code: 13664
- Area code: 315
- FIPS code: 36-012-48543
- GNIS feature ID: 976680
- Website: https://www.townofmorristownny.gov/

Morristown is a town in St. Lawrence County, New York, United States. The population was 1,974 at the 2010 census. The town is named after Gouverneur Morris, a signer of the United States Declaration of Independence and landowner in New York.

The Town of Morristown is on the northwestern part of the county and contains a village also named Morristown. The village and town are northwest of Gouverneur.

== History ==
The town, part of Macomb's Purchase, was first settled permanently circa 1808 on the site of the present hamlet (and former village) of Morristown.

One of the first battles in the War of 1812 was a naval battle in the St. Lawrence River between two warships.

The town was established in 1821 from part of the Town of Oswegatchie, where it was known as "Haque.". Morristown was reduced twice to make new towns: Hammond (1827) and Macomb (1841).

Due to the lack of waterpower, a windmill was erected in 1828, but stopped working and was abandoned two years later.

== Geography ==
According to the United States Census Bureau, the town has a total area of 59.4 sq mi (154 km^{2}), of which 45.9 sq mi (119 km^{2}) is land and 13.6 sq mi (35 km^{2}) (22.83%) is water.

The northern town line of Morristown is the international border with Ontario, Canada, defined by the St. Lawrence River. The town is dominated by two major bodies of water: the St. Lawrence River and Black Lake, which defines the southern town line.

New York State Route 37 is an east–west highway. New York State Route 12, another east–west route, is more northerly and follows the St. Lawrence River. New York State Route 58 is a north–south route, which intersects NY-37 at the hamlet of Morristown.

== Demographics ==
Historical population
Census	Pop.	Note	%±
1820	827		—
1830	1,618		95.6%
1840	2,809		73.6%
1850	2,274		−19.0%
1860	2,284		0.4%
1870	1,954		−14.4%
1880	2,186		11.9%
1890	1,966		−10.1%
1900	1,798		−8.5%
1910	1,888		5.0%
1920	1,719		−9.0%
1930	1,658		−3.5%
1940	1,635		−1.4%
1950	1,569		−4.0%
1960	1,776		13.2%
1970	1,823		2.6%
1980	1,921		5.4%
1990	2,019		5.1%
2000	2,050		1.5%
2010	1,974		−3.7%
2020	2,082		5.5%

As of the census of 2000, there were 2,050 people, 816 households, and 581 families residing in the town. The population density was 44.7 inhabitants per square mile (17.3/km^{2}). There were 1,535 housing units at an average density of 33.5 per square mile (12.9/km^{2}). The racial makeup of the town was 97.56% White, 0.49% Black or African American, 0.98% Native American, 0.10% Asian, 0.20% from other races, and 0.68% from two or more races. Hispanic or Latino of any race were 1.02% of the population.

There were 816 households, out of which 29.9% had children under the age of 18 living with them, 56.4% were married couples living together, 10.2% had a female householder with no husband present, and 28.7% were non-families. 23.9% of all households were made up of individuals, and 8.8% had someone living alone who was 65 years of age or older. The average household size was 2.50 and the average family size was 2.90.

In the town, the population was spread out, with 25.0% under the age of 18, 6.0% from 18 to 24, 26.7% from 25 to 44, 28.3% from 45 to 64, and 13.9% who were 65 years of age or older. The median age was 40 years. For every 100 females, there were 99.2 males. For every 100 females age 18 and over, there were 98.3 males.

The median income for a household in the town was $33,458, and the median income for a family was $36,591. Males had a median income of $30,474 versus $20,741 for females. The per capita income for the town was $17,133. About 11.5% of families and 16.4% of the population were below the poverty line, including 26.7% of those under age 18 and 5.9% of those age 65 or over.

== Communities and locations in the Town of Morristown ==
- American Island – A small island in the St. Lawrence River in the northwestern corner of Morristown.
- Big Bay – A bay at the southwestern end of Black Lake.
- Big Island – A large island at the southern end of Black Lake.
- Black Lake – An elongated lake that defines the southeastern town line.
- Booths Island – An island in Black Lake by Edwardsville.
- Bowman Island – An island at the southern end of Black Lake.
- Brier Hill – A hamlet south of Morristown village on NY-37. The Young Memorial Church was listed on the National Register of Historic Places in 2011.
- Brier Hill Station – A location south of Brier Hill, settled circa 1853.
- Cedars – A hamlet in the southwestern corner of the townby Black Lake on County Road 6.
- Chippewa Creek – A stream flowing southwest through the town.
- Conger Island – An island at the southern end of Black Lake.
- Edgewater Park – A hamlet northeast of Morristown village on the St. Lawerence River.
- Edwardsville – A hamlet at the southern town line on NY-58 by County Road 6, named after an early postmaster. It was formerly called "The Narrows" and was the location of a ferry across Black Lake. The crossing is now achieved by a bridge.
- Emery Island – An island at the southern end of Black Lake.
- Elizabeth Island – An island in Black Lake, formerly a club for the wealthy.
- Jacques Cartier State Park – A state park southwest of Morristown village.
- Lonesome Bay – A bay at the southwestern end of Black Lake.
- Longs Corners – A hamlet between Morristown village and Edwardsville on NY-58.
- Lower Deep Bay – A bay north of Big Island.
- Morristown – The Hamlet of Morristown is on the southern bank of the St. Lawrence River by the junctions of NY-12, NY-37 and NY-58.
- Morristown Center – A hamlet by the eastern town line.
- Old Man Island – A small island in the St. Lawrence River east of the state park.
- Point Comfort – A projection into the St. Lawrence River west of the state park.
- Terrace Park – A hamlet northeast of Morristown village and south of Edgewater Park.
- Upper Deep Bay – A bay south of Big Island.

== Cultural allusions ==
- Morristown is mentioned in Chapter LI of Theodore Dreiser's The Titan.
