= August 1958 =

Month of 1958

<<	August 1958					>>
Su	Mo	Tu	We	Th	Fr	Sa
					1	2
3	4	5	6	7	8	9
10	11	12	13	14	15	16
17	18	19	20	21	22	23
24	25	26	27	28	29	30
31

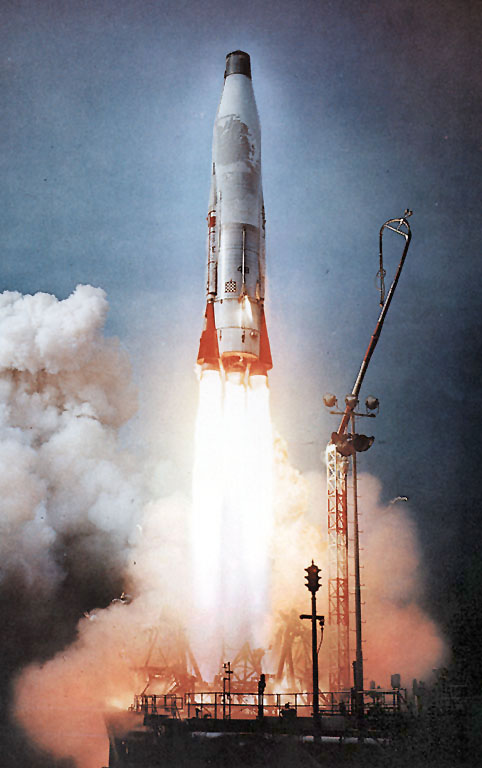
August 2, 1958: U.S. makes first successful launch of an ICBM, the Atlas-B rocket

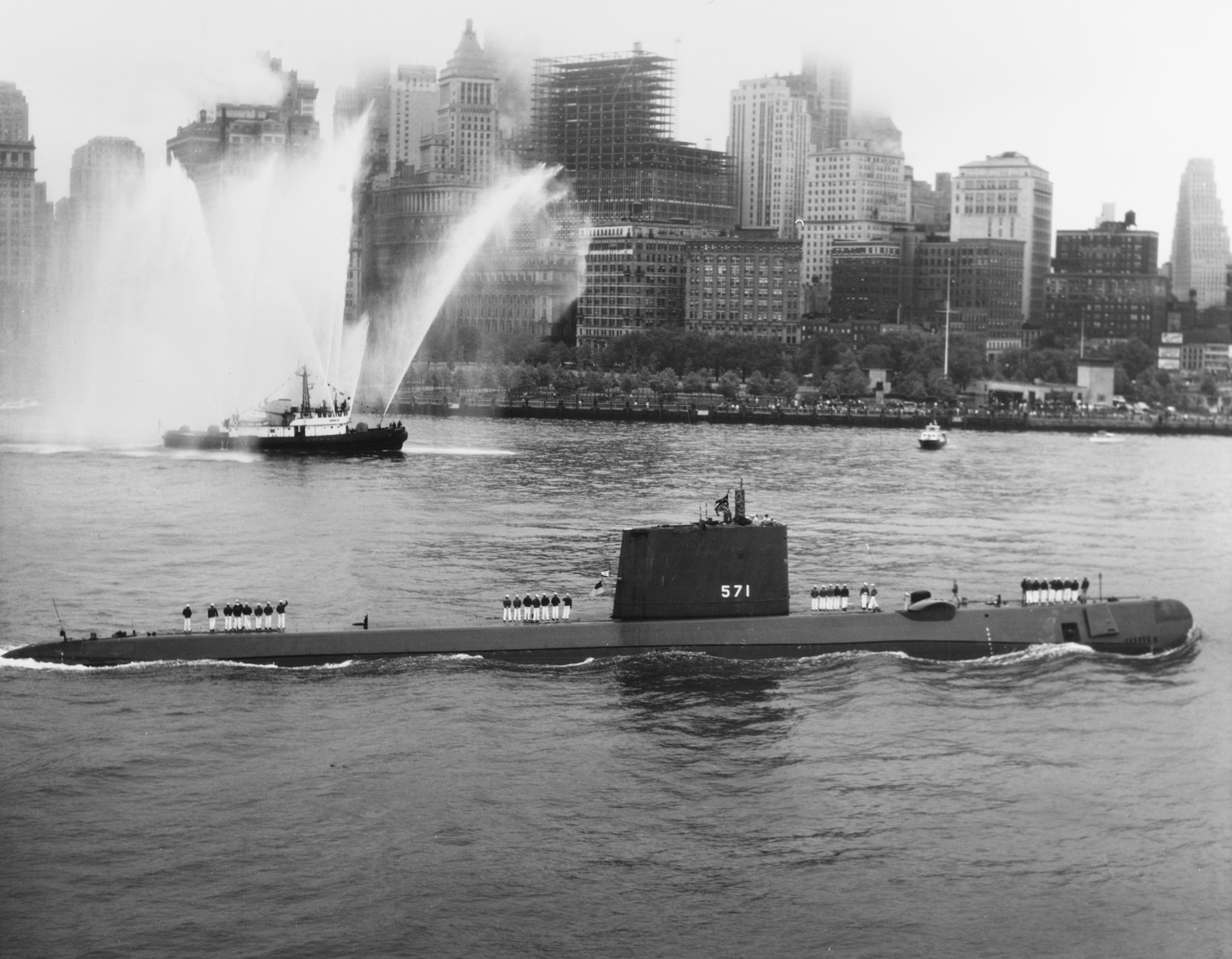
August 3, 1958: U.S. nuclear submarine Nautilus is first to sail under the North Pole (shown arriving in New York City for August 25 welcome celebration)

The following events occurred in August 1958:

== August 1, 1958 (Friday) ==
- As part of its Operation Hardtack tests, the United States detonated a 3.88 megaton hydrogen bomb directly above the test site at Johnston Atoll in the South Pacific Ocean, due to an error that exploded the Redstone missile before it could reach a point over the ocean 6 miles (9.7 km) away. The blast, occurring at an altitude of 252,000 feet (47.7 miles (76.8 km)), was witnessed by thousands of people in the parts of the U.S. territory of the Hawaiian Islands 700 miles (1,100 km) away at 12:52 a.m. Hawaii time (1052 UTC, 11:52 p.m. July 31 at the test site).
- Trial for 91 South Africans accused of high treason (57 black, 16 white, 16 of India ancestry and two mixed race), on charges of conspiring to overthrow the government, began in Pretoria. The original indictment had been for 156 people arrested 19 months earlier in December 1956.
- Royal assent was given to the State of Singapore Act 1958, providing for internal self-government for the British colony of Singapore and an eventual transition to independence.
- Ian Fraser, Governor of the British Broadcasting Corporation, became the first person to receive a Life Peerage, a non-hereditary title (with privilege to be a member of the House of Lords) created under the Life Peerages Act 1958. Fraser, who had served in the House of Commons since being elected in 1950, was granted the title Baron Fraser of Lonsdale.
- With his guerrilla troops surrounded by the Cuban Army after the Battle of Las Mercedes and facing an end to his Cuban Revolution, Fidel Castro asked General Eulogio Cantillo for a seven-day ceasefire so that surrender negotiations could be pursued. A truce was agreed upon and, during the time when Castro and Cantillo were negotiating, the 300 26th of July Movement guerrillas gradually retreated every night back into the hills. When General Cantillo attempted to attack on August 8, Castro's forces could not be found. General Cantillo then signed a secret agreement with Castro to call off further fighting.
- The Advanced Research Projects Agency of the U.S. Department of Defense canceled its funding of the U.S. Air Force's "Man in Space Soonest" (MISS) program, 37 days after the USAF had announced the selection of nine men being trained to be the first American astronauts. The cancellation came in the wake of the July 29 creation of the National Aeronautics and Space Administration (NASA) to supersede the National Advisory Committee for Aeronautics (NACA) and to place the U.S. space program primarily under civilian control.
- Dr. Hugh L. Dryden, NACA Director, presented a program on the technology of crewed spaceflight vehicles to the Select Committees of Congress on Astronautics and Space Exploration.
- Born: Adrian Dunbar, Northern Irish television and stage actor, and film screenwriter; in Enniskillen, County Fermanagh
- Died: Albert E. Smith, 83, English-born U.S. film producer who founded Vitagraph Studios, one of the earliest newsreel companies

== August 2, 1958 (Saturday) ==
- The United States made its first successful test of its most powerful rocket, the three-engine Atlas-B intercontinental ballistic missile. Liftoff from Cape Canaveral in Florida took place at 5:16 in the afternoon local time. The first attempt at launching the Atlas-B, made on July 19, failed when the rocket blew apart while in flight.
- U.S. Army Sergeant James R. Nettles became the first American soldier to die in combat in the Middle East. The 20-year-old resident of Olustee, Florida, was struck by a sniper's bullet while riding in a patrol of Beirut, the capital of Lebanon. Sgt. Nettles was the fifth U.S. serviceman to die in the American invasion of Lebanon, after four had died in separate accidents.
- The Arab Federation, created on February 14 by the uniting of the nations of Iraq and Jordan into a new country, was formally dissolved by Jordan's King Hussein less than six months after it had been created. On July 14, the Iraqi Army had assassinated Hussein's cousin, King Faisal II of Iraq, abolished the monarchy and declared a republic.
- A Sabena airliner that had strayed into the airspace of Czechoslovakia, during a thunderstorm, was forced by two Czechoslovak Air Force MiG fighters to land at an air force base in České Budějovice. Rather than keeping the group captive, as other Communist nations like East Germany and the Soviet Union had done with airplanes that had come into their airspace, the Czechoslovaks released the Belgian passengers and crew after four hours, during which the group was "entertained with a good dinner."
- Born: Show Hayami (stage name for Ohama Yasushi), prolific Japanese voice actor for anime; in Takasago, Hyōgo,
- Died: Dr. Michele Navarra, 53, Italian member of the Sicilian Mafia and boss of the Corleone gang, was ambushed and killed along with a passenger, Dr. Giovanni Russo, while driving on a country road in Sicily. The hit began a series of reciprocal murders that would continue for five years.

== August 3, 1958 (Sunday) ==
- The nuclear-powered submarine USS Nautilus and its crew of 111 U.S. Navy servicemen (13 commissioned officers and 98 non-commissioned men) and five American civilian scientific observers, became the first vessel to sail underneath the North Pole, whose ice cap is impenetrable by surface ships. The accomplishment was announced five days later when the voyage of Nautilus was revealed by U.S. President Dwight D. Eisenhower at a ceremony presenting Commander William R. Anderson with the Legion of Merit at the White House. "Nautilus" had also been the name of the submarine, used by British explorer Hubert Wilkins, that came within 600 miles (970 km) of its attempt to sail to the North Pole, and of the fictional submarine in Jules Verne's 1869 novel, Twenty Thousand Leagues Under the Seas, which included a chapter of Captain Nemo sailing under the ice of Antarctica.

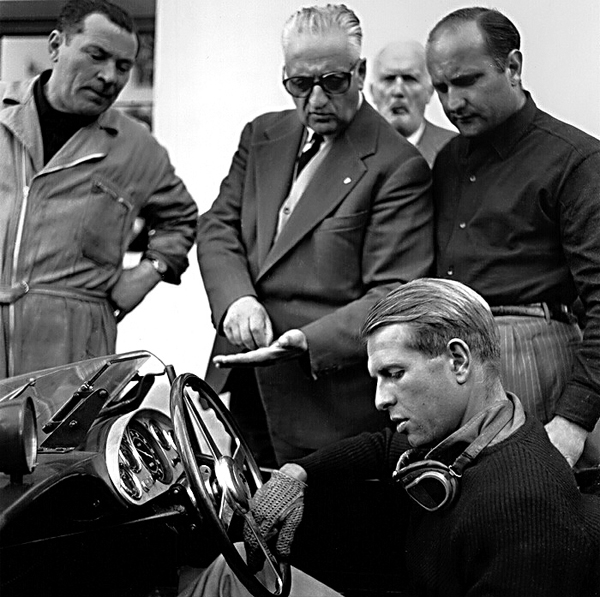
Collins in his car in Modena, 1957

- Peter Collins, 26, British race car driver and 1958 British Grand Prix winner, was killed in a crash during the German Grand Prix in Nürburgring in West Germany. Collins, who, along with Stirling Moss and Mike Hawthorn, was one of the "Big Three" of British sports car racing, was traveling past Adenau on the 11th lap of the 15-lap race when his Ferrari racer went off the track and rolled over. He was being flown by a West German Army helicopter to a hospital for emergency surgery for a fractured skull and brain injuries and died en route.
- The record for attendance at the 67,205-seat Yankee Stadium was set when 123,707 people came to the Jehovah's Witnesses International Convention. A commemorative plaque remained after the demolition of the structure following the construction of the new Yankee Stadium.
- Born:
  - Alexander Nevzorov, Soviet Russian TV journalist known as host of the program 600 Seconds and as a member of the Duma, the Russian parliament; in Leningrad, Russian SFSR, Soviet Union
  - Augusto Minzolini, Italian journalist known as the director of the program RAI news program TG1 and as a member of the Italian Senate; in Rome
  - Lambert Wilson, French film actor; in Neuilly-sur-Seine, Hauts-de-Seine département

== August 4, 1958 (Monday) ==
- A team of two mountaineers from Japan (Masao Fujihira and Kazumasa Hirai) became the first persons to reach the top of the 37th-highest mountain in the world, the 25,112-foot (7,654 m) high Chogolisa II peak in the Karakoram range. Professor Takeo Kuwabara wrote later that Fujihira and Hirai reached the top of Chogolisa, "Bride Peak", at 4:30 in the afternoon local time and that "the top was too small to be occupied by the two."
- A team of three mountaineers from Austria (Heinrich Roiss, Stefan Pauer and Franz Mandl) became the first persons to reach the top of the 67th-highest mountain in the world, the 24,308-foot (7,409 m) Haramosh Peak in the Himalayas. Roiss would later write that the group reached the summit at about 2:00 in the afternoon local time, 13 hours after setting off from their camp, but "We were much too weary to enjoy that moment, to which we had so long been looking forward. We cowered down on the summit, which is no bigger than a table, and our only thought was rest and recuperation."
- On the island of Cyprus, a truce between Greek Cypriots and Turkish Cypriots was announced by Greek Army Colonel Georgios Grivas, leader of the underground group EOKA, which sought for Cyprus to become a part of Greece. The ceasefire came after appeals to both sides by the Prime Ministers of Greece, Turkey and the United Kingdom.
- The Billboard Hot 100, Billboard magazine's weekly documentation of the most popular recorded songs in the United States, regardless of musical genre, was published for the first time, with rankings based on the averaging of surveys of best-selling and most played songs. While Billboard had ranked songs since 1945 in three separate charts for surveys best sales from stores, most played on radio stations and most played on jukeboxes, the "Hot 100" was the first to consolidate the results into a single, definitive endorsement of popularity. The first number one hit on the Hot 100 was Ricky Nelson's recording of the song "Poor Little Fool", written by Sharon Sheeley.
- The last television program of the DuMont Television Network in the U.S., Boxing from St. Nicholas Arena, was telecast on five stations in the U.S. that had once been part of the DuMont network, which had given up most of its programming two years earlier but was still under contract to broadcast boxing. The last fight pitted lightweight Lenny Matthews against Steve Ward.
- A U.S. District Judge in Richmond, Virginia issued an order allowing the public school system of Prince Edward County, Virginia, an unprecedented seven years to accomplish racial desegregation, with black and white students to be educated in separate schools until the beginning of the 1965–1966 school year. Judge Charles Sterling Hutcheson justified the seven-year delay based on language in the 1954 U.S. Supreme Court decision in Brown v. Board of Education that desegregation should be accomplished "with all deliberate speed", even if done 11 years after the decision.
- The horse racing career of Bold Ruler, the 1957 "Horse of the Year" in the United States, was declared at an end by his trainer, Sunny Jim Fitzsimmons, who announced that the injured thoroughbred would be retired to stud at Claiborne Farm near Paris, Kentucky. Bold Ruler's record as ancestor of champion race horses would become greater than his own racing record, siring 1973 Triple Crown champion Secretariat and being the sire of the sires of six other Kentucky Derby winners: Dust Commander (1970), Cannonade (1974), Foolish Pleasure (1975), Bold Forbes (1976) and Spectacular Bid (1979). In addition, a third-generation descendant, Seattle Slew, would be the winner in 1977.
- Died: Archbishop Mario Zanin, 68, Italian Roman Catholic cleric and diplomat for the Vatican who served as its Apostolic Delegate to China (1933–1946), and Apostolic Nuncio to Chile (1947–1953) and Argentina (1953–1958)

== August 5, 1958 (Tuesday) ==
- East German Army Lieutenant Colonel Siegfried Dombrowski, the deputy director of intelligence administration for the Communist nation's military intelligence agency, drove across the border into West Berlin along with his wife and children and 71,000 West German marks, and asked the U.S. Army to give him asylum. Over the next several weeks, he would disclose what information he knew to the U.S. Central Intelligence Agency.
- A retired U.S. Army general's editorial caused an internal investigation in the U.S. Department of Defense, when the St. Louis Post-Dispatch published a column from its military analyst, retired U.S. Army General Thomas R. Phillips, headlined "Question of When U.S. Should Surrender in All-Out Nuclear Attack Studied for Pentagon; Scientists Are Proceeding on Assumption Russia Has Achieved, or Is Rapidly Gaining, Intercontinental Superiority With Missiles" General Phillips wrote, "Three non-profit scientific agencies working for the Defense Department or the services are making studies as to whether the United States can survive and continue to fight after an all-out nuclear attack. One is studying the conditions when surrender would be advisable, rather than to continue a war that is already lost." Three days later, Missouri's U.S. Senator, Stuart Symington, read the article into the Congressional Record and when word reached U.S. President Dwight D. Eisenhower (who was a retired U.S. General of the Army), Eisenhower ordered a "top-to-bottom Pentagon investigation" of the source of the article. An unidentified U.S. Senator told the Associated Press, "I've never seen the President so mad... he turned everything upside down in the Pentagon getting to the bottom of it." The U.S. Senate voted, 88 to 2, to amend an appropriations bill to prohibit the use of federal funds "to support any study of possible United States surrender to an enemy in a future nuclear war", an action that President Eisenhower called "too ridiculous for further comment."

== August 6, 1958 (Wednesday) ==
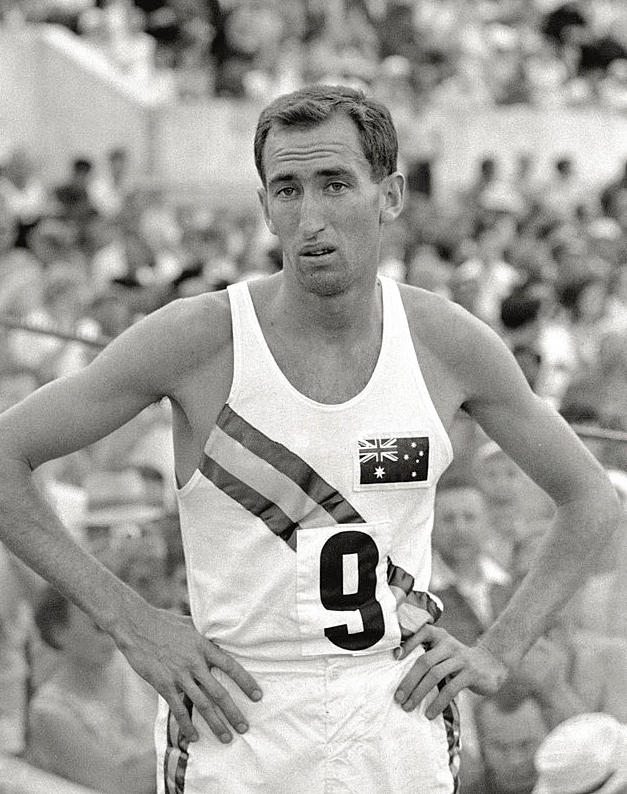
Herb Elliott at the 1960 Olympics

- In Ireland, Australian athlete Herb Elliott clipped almost three full seconds off the world record for the mile run at Santry Stadium in Dublin. Elliott beat the record set by Derek Ibbotson of the UK (3:57.2 in London on July 19, 1957) with a time of 3 minutes 54.5 seconds. At the time, the International Association of Athletics Federations (IAAF) had still not certified Ibbotson's time because of charges that the record had been achieved with the aid of another athlete pacing him, so the record was still 3:58.0 set by John Landy on June 21, 1954. Three other runners also bested Landy's record in the same meet: Australia's Merv Lincoln (3:55.9); and Ireland's Ron Delany and New Zealand's Murray Halberg, both at 3:57.5.

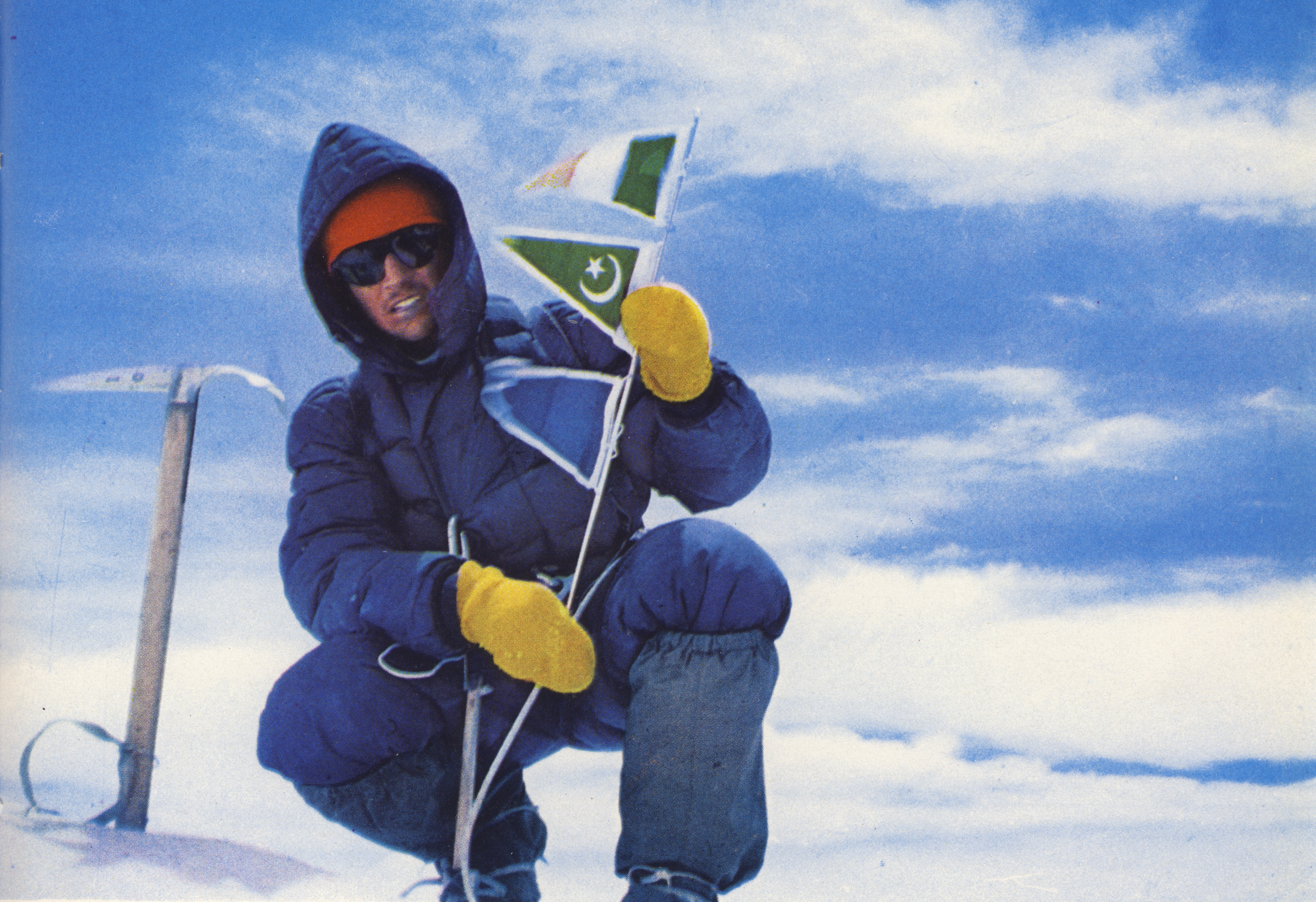
Walter Bonatti on top of the 17th highest mountain on Earth

- The 17th highest mountain in the world, the 26,001 feet (7,925 m) Gasherbrum IV, was reached for the first time as Walter Bonatti and Carlo Mauri climbed to the top as part of an Italian expedition led by Riccardo Cassin.
- The Law of Permanent Defense of Democracy, which outlawed the Communist Party of Chile and banned 26,650 persons from the electoral lists, was enacted. is repealed.

== August 7, 1958 (Thursday) ==
- The South American nation of Colombia returned to civilian rule as General Gabriel París Gordillo, chairman of the military junta that had ruled the nation since 1957, stepped down for the inauguration of the President Alberto Lleras Camargo.
- A fiery ship collision killed 18 crew on the oil tanker SS Gulfoil and seriously injured 19 others on the Gulfoil and 14 on the gasoline tanker it collided with, MV S.E. Graham. Both ships were sailing in a fog at the U.S. harbor of Newport, Rhode Island. The Gulfoil had unloaded its cargo at Providence and was sailing out of the harbor when it struck the port bow of the S.E. Graham, which was inbound with 650,000 U.S. gallons of gasoline, and the Gulfoil subsequently exploded.
- Born:
  - Russell Baze, Canadian-born American jockey with the most wins in North American horse racing history, and a member of the National Museum of Racing and Hall of Fame; in Vancouver
  - Bruce Dickinson, English rock musician and lead singer for Iron Maiden; in Worksop, Nottinghamshire

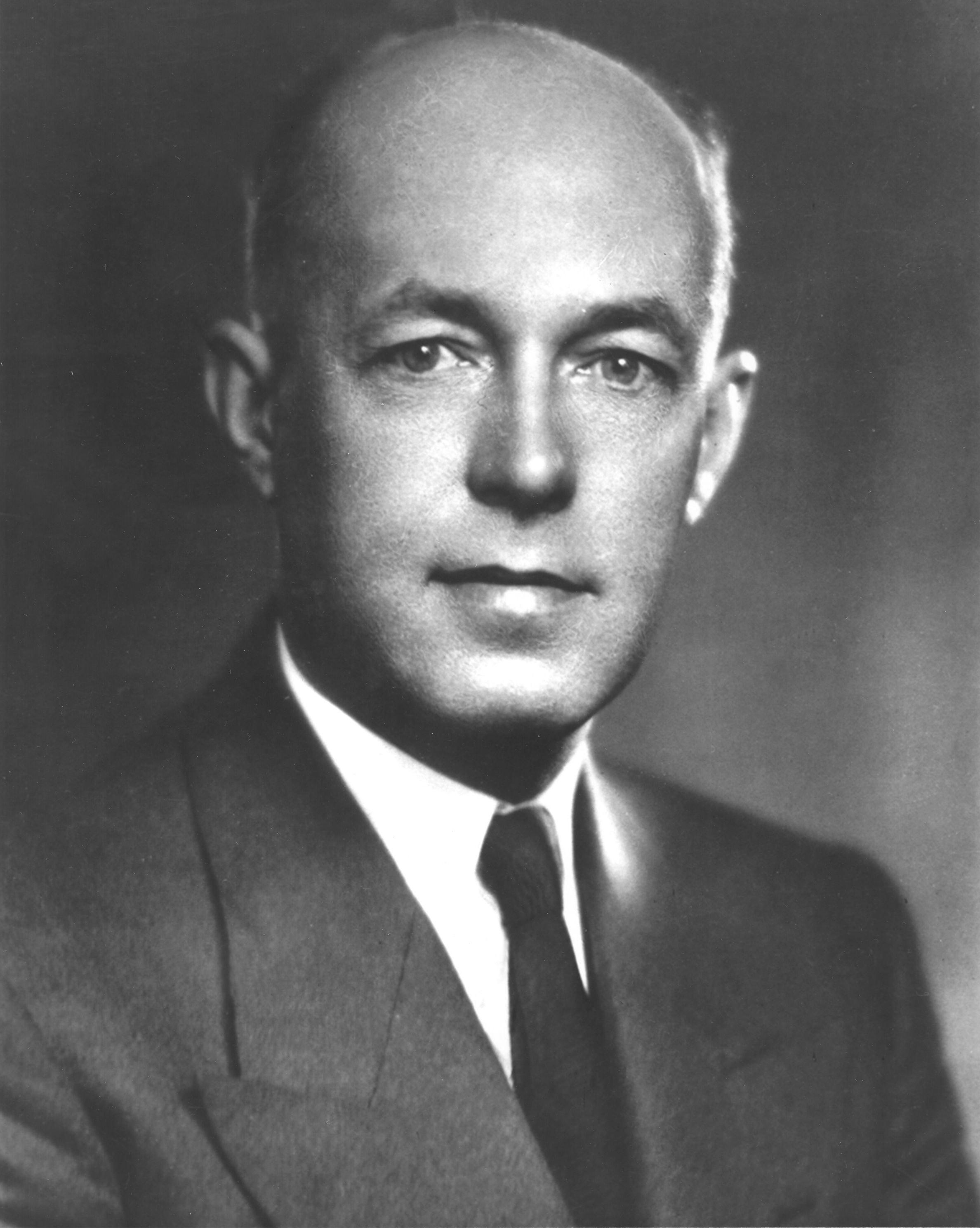
Yardley

- Died: Herbert Yardley, 69, American cryptographer who directed the cryptanalysis bureau of the American Black Chamber, a U.S. government agency financed by both the War Department and the State Department and broke the code used by the Japanese Empire, and later revealed the existence of the top secret agency.

== August 8, 1958 (Friday) ==
- In India, Sheikh Abdullah, the "Lion of Kashmir", was re-arrested seven months after having been released from house arrest on January 8. Abdullah had been indicted along with 23 other people accused of sedition by the Indian government in what became known as the Kashmir Conspiracy Case, and charged with plotting to make India's Jammu and Kashmir an independent nation. His arrest came exactly five years after he had been dismissed as Chief Minister of the province. He would remain incarcerated until the dismissal of the case in 1964.
- Barbara Wootton became the first woman to be appointed to serve in Britain's House of Lords under the new Life Peerages Act 1958, being given the new title of Baroness Wootton of Abinger.
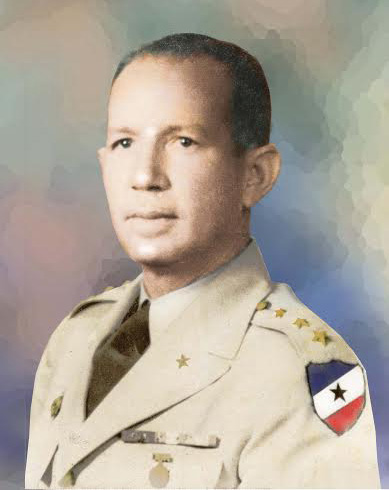
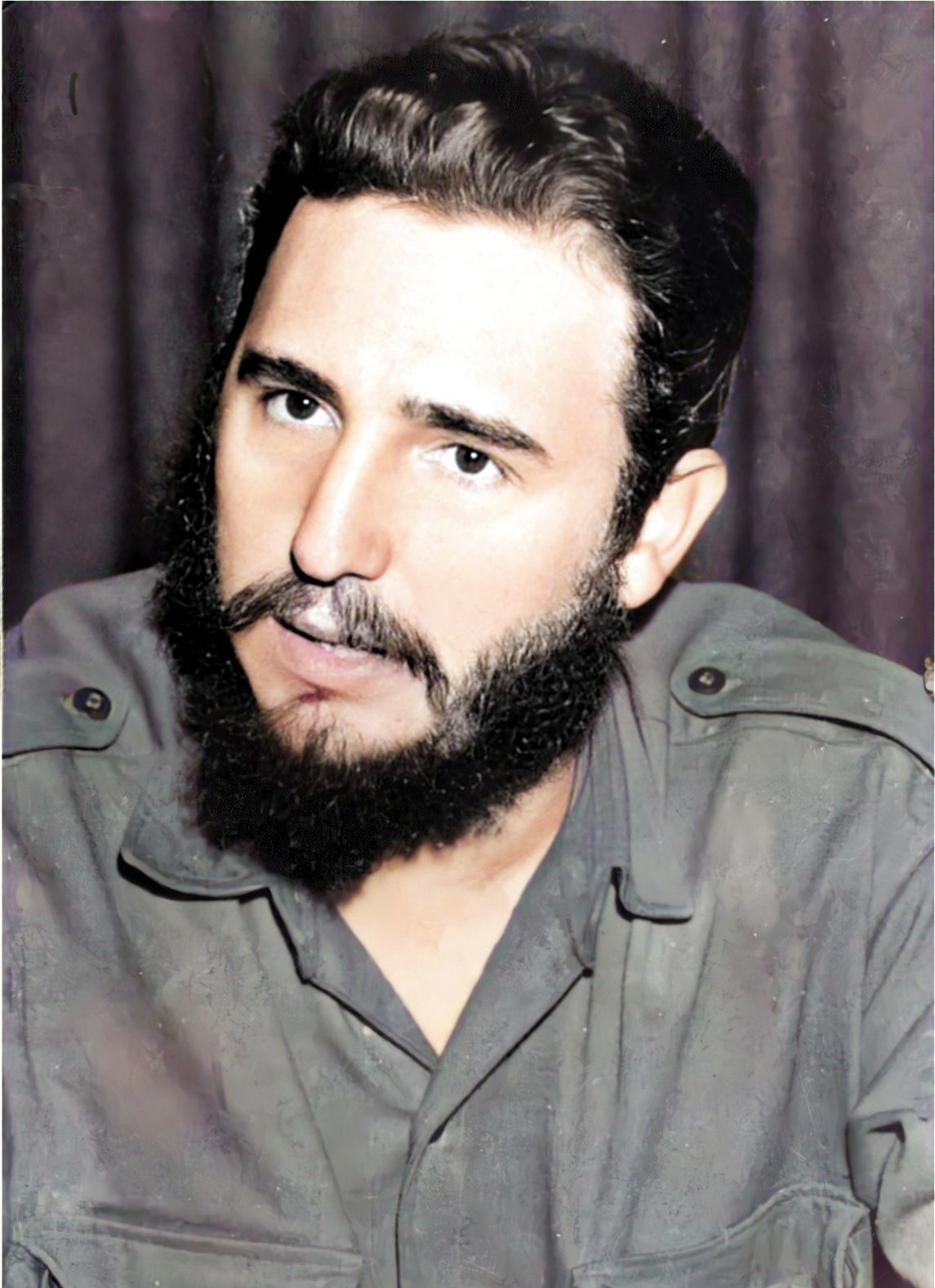
Cuban General Cantillo and Fidel Castro
- In a turning point in the Cuban Revolution, Cuban Army General Eulogio Cantillo, Chief of the Joint Staff of the Armed Forces for President Fulgencio Batista, signed a secret armistice with Fidel Castro's 26th of July Movement. General Cantillo ordered a halt to Operation Verano, the unsuccessful offensive to fight Castro's guerrillas in the Sierra Maestra hills.
- At 8:00 a.m. local time, New York City began a crackdown on jaywalking, the oft-violated law against walking a street at a point other than a posted crosswalk, after a two-month warning period, including a 30-day interval of stopping and warning violators that, beginning August 8, they would be subject to a fine of two dollars, equivalent to US$20 sixty years later. On the first day of the enforcement, 479 summonses were issued, with more than half (255 in Manhattan), 93 in Brooklyn, 98 in Queens, 31 in the Bronx and two in Richmond Heights (which had only one "Don't Walk" signal).
- A memorandum from the U.S. Secretary of the Army to the U.S. Secretary of Defense recommended Project Adam for a human spaceflight program. This plan proposed a ballistic suborbital flight using existing Redstone hardware as a national political-psychological demonstration. This memo proposed that funds in the amount of $9 million and $2.5 million for fiscal years 1959 and 1960, respectively, be approved for program execution.
- Born: Akihiro Nishimura, Japanese soccer football midfielder with 49 appearances of the Japan national team; in Osaka
- Died:
  - Viscount Bracken, 57, the United Kingdom's Minister of Information during World War II from 1941 to 1945, and leader of the merger of the Financial Times and the Financial News into one of the largest financial newspapers in the world, died of throat cancer.
  - J. P. McEvoy, 63, American humorist, author and editor

== August 9, 1958 (Saturday) ==
- The crash of Central African Airways Flight 890 killed 36 of the 54 people on board. The Vickers Viscount 745D turboprop was on the fifth leg of a multistop flight from Salisbury in Southern Rhodesia (now Harare, Zimbabwe) to London's Heathrow Airport, and was approaching Benghazi in Libya when it crashed into a hillside while attempting to land.
- Died: Felipe Boero, 74, Argentine operatic composer

== August 10, 1958 (Sunday) ==
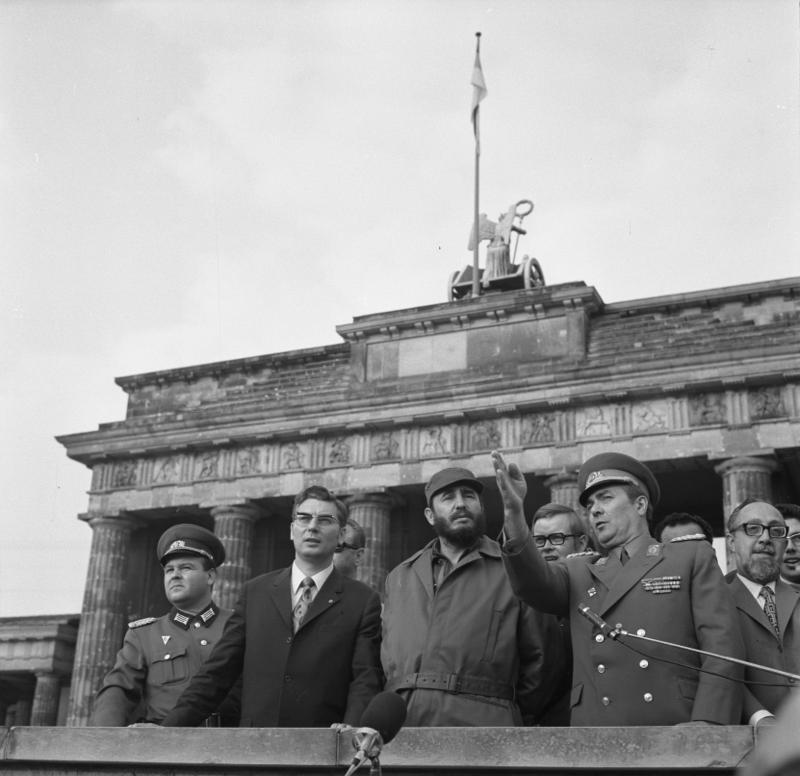
Castro (center) and Rodriguez (far right) in East Berlin in 1972 alongside Lt. General Arthur Kunath

- Carlos Rafael Rodríguez, leader of Cuba's Communist party, the Partido Socialista Popular (PSP), completed three weeks of meetings with Cuban rebel Fidel Castro in the hills of the Sierra Maestra, and reversed the PSP's original policy dismissing Castro's guerrilla warfare against the regime of Fulgencio Batista. From the agreement came the alliance of Castro's 26th of July Movement and Rodriguez's Communist party structure, and the subsequent support of Castro by the Soviet Union.
- Born: Rami Hamdallah, Prime Minister of the Palestinian National Authority from 2014 to 2019; in Anabta, West Bank, Jordan

== August 11, 1958 (Monday) ==
- The United Nations Convention on the Nationality of Married Women entered into force.
- Five people were killed and more than 20 injured in the head-on collision of two Erie Railroad trains in front of a closed depot at Sterlington, New York, after a signal operator failed to direct a westbound train to stop for an eastbound commuter train. When the operator realized his error, he tried to radio both trains to stop but neither one received the signal and the two collided at 6:47 in the morning.

== August 12, 1958 (Tuesday) ==
- All 33 people on All Nippon Airways Flight 25 were killed as the Douglas DC-3 was flying from Tokyo to Nagoya. The right engine of the twin-engine airplane failed an hour into the flight. The airliner plunged into the Pacific Ocean 17 miles (27 km) from the island of Toshima.
- The Argentine Navy landed 80 troops on Snipe island, an uninhabited islet, located in the Beagle Channel and claimed by both Argentina and Chile. The incursion was the latest in a series of events that began on January 12 when the Chilean Navy transporter Micalvi erected a small lighthouse for navigation. In April, Argentina's Commander of Naval Operations sent the patrol boat ARA Guarani to destroy the Chilean building and replaced by an Argentine structure; the Chilean patrol boat Lientur destroyed the Argentine building on May 11 and installed another building on June 8; the Argentine destroyer ARA San Juan fired artillery to destroy the Chilean house the next day, and Argentina's next move was to build a permanent settlement on the otherwise uninhabitable rock.
- Fifty-seven jazz greats, including Count Basie, Thelonious Monk, Gene Krupa, Gerry Mulligan, Dizzy Gillespie, and Charles Mingus assemble in Harlem for a group photo. A Great Day in Harlem would be called "the most iconic photo in jazz history".
- The Federal Switchblade Act was signed into law in the United States.

== August 13, 1958 (Wednesday) ==
- As part of his "Great Leap Forward" program approved in January, Chairman Mao Zedong of the Chinese Communist Party, the de facto leader of the People's Republic of China, reviewed the success of a model collective farm commune that had been created at Chayashan in Henan Province. Chairman Mao issued an order to apply the model of Chayashan, where individual farming plots were not allowed and all members of the commune were required to dine at a communal kitchen, to all farms nationwide. A report in the Communist Party newspaper People's Daily (Jenmin Jihpao) reported that the communes covered wide areas, with the largest comprising 95,000 people in the Liaoning province, and another one of 21,000 in Henan province.
- Died:
  - Jack Cole, 43, American cartoonist and comic book artist who had created the character Plastic Man for Quality Comics in 1941, and then later worked for Playboy magazine, shot himself to death less than three months after he had created a new comic strip, Betsy and Me, for the Chicago Tribune.
  - Malcolm Lockheed, 70, American aviation engineer originally known as Malcolm Loughead and co-founder of the Lockheed Corporation.

== August 14, 1958 (Thursday) ==
- All 99 people aboard KLM Flight 607-E were killed when the Super Constellation jet airliner crashed into Atlantic Ocean after taking off from Shannon Airport in Ireland to travel to Gander, Newfoundland in Canada as part of a multi-stop flight from Amsterdam to New York City. The loss of life was the highest, up to that time, in a commercial aviation disaster.
- The term "missile gap" was coined by U.S. Senator (and future U.S. president) John F. Kennedy to describe a perceived difference between the size of the American arsenal of ballistic missiles and a possibly superior number of missiles available to the Soviet Union. Kennedy was specifically referring to "the period from 1960 to 1964", described by experts at the Pentagon, "in which this country's missile development is expected to lag so far behind the Russians as to cause a grave threat to our national existence."
- Died:
  - Frédéric Joliot-Curie, 58, French physicist and co-winner (with his wife Irène Joliot-Curie) of the 1935 Nobel Prize in Chemistry for the discovery of production of artificial radioactive elements and a member of the French Communist Party's Central Committee, died of an internal hemorrhage resulting from cancer of the liver.
  - Komakichi Matsuoka, 70, Japanese Speaker of the House from 1947 to 1948

== August 15, 1958 (Friday) ==
- All 64 passengers and crew on Aeroflot Flight 4 in the Russian SFSR were killed when the Tupolev Tu-104 jet airliner crashed half an hour after taking off from Khabarovsk toward Irkutsk as a stop on a flight to Moscow. At 3:18 in the afternoon (0518 UTC), the pilot indicated that the jet was in distress and, a few minutes later, the aircraft crashed into a dense forest 134 miles (216 km) from Khabarovsk.
- The crash of Northeast Airlines Flight 258 in the United States killed 25 of the 34 people on board after the Convair 240 twin-engine piston-powered airliner was cleared for the approach to Nantucket, Massachusetts. At 11:34 at night (0334 UTC August 16), the flight, which had departed from La Guardia Airport in New York, impacted the ground 1,700 feet (520 m) from Runway 24 while attempting to land in a dense fog. The nine survivors had all been passengers.
- A diver from Yugoslavia, Božo Dimnik, discovered the wreckage of the Austro-Hungarian passenger ship SS Baron Gautsch, which sank in the Adriatic Sea 44 years and two days earlier, on August 13, 1914, after striking a minefield laid by the Austro-Hungarian Navy shortly after the outbreak of World War I.
- The Soviet Union announced the further demotion of former Prime Minister Nikolai Bulganin, who had been removed in March from his post as head of the Soviet government and transferred temporarily to the still-important position as the chairman of Gosbank, the national banking agency of the Soviet Union. Bulganin's new assignment was to fill a vacancy in a Sovnarkhoz, one of the 105 regional economic councils in the U.S.S.R., for the area around Stavropol, a city in the Caucasus Mountains of southeastern Russia and almost 800 miles (1,300 km) from Moscow.
- Paraguay's dictator, General Alfredo Stroessner, was inaugurated to a new five-year term as President of the South American nation after an election in which he was the only candidate on the ballot, and all 40 members of the Chamber of Deputies belonged to Stroessner's Colorado Party.
- The defending NFL champion Detroit Lions suffered a humiliating defeat in the Chicago College All-Star Game, an annual preseason exhibition football game for charity where the NFL champion was matched against college football players who had graduated. The win was the second-to-last for college players, whose representatives lost 31 of the 42 games against the NFL champion before the series was discontinued after 1976.
- Born:
  - Simon Baron-Cohen, British clinical psychologist, in Hampstead, London
  - Simpal "Simple" Kapadia, Hindi film actress and costume designer; in Bombay (d., 2009)

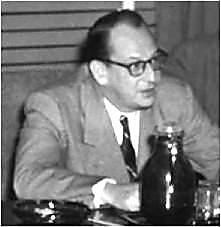
Dean

- Died: Gordon Dean, American lawyer and former Chairman of the United States Atomic Energy Commission (AEC) from 1950 to 1953, was killed in the crash of Northeast Flight 258.

== August 16, 1958 (Saturday) ==
- A 6.7 magnitude earthquake killed at least 132 people in Iran's Hamadan and Lorestan provinces, hitting an area near the towns of Malayer, Nahavand and Tuyserkan.
- The French Ministry of the Overseas announced that France would grant full internal autonomy to the West African colony of the French Cameroons, after having a request from the colonial parliament, with a transition to full independence by 1960. France continued to be responsible for the Cameroons' foreign affairs and defense, but would turn over control of the court system, public liberties and currency.
- The TV game show Dotto, so popular in the United States at one time that it was shown on both the CBS and NBC networks, was canceled abruptly by its sponsor, the Colgate-Palmolive Company, in the wake of accusations by a former contestant that the show's producers had supplied answers in advance to players. People who tuned in to CBS at 11:30 on Monday morning found that Top Dollar, which had run on Saturday evenings, was the abrupt replacement for Dotto.
- Born:
  - Madonna (stage name for Madonna Louise Ciccone), American pop music superstar who ranks as the best-selling female recording artist of all time, as well as being an award-winning film actress; in Bay City, Michigan
  - Angela Bassett, American television and film actress; in New York City
- Died:
  - Wolcott Gibbs, 56, American playwright, drama critic and humorist, died of a sudden heart attack while reviewing an advance copy of his latest book More in Sorrow.
  - José Domingues dos Santos, 73, Prime Minister of Portugal 1924 to 1925
  - Paul Panzer (stage name for Paul Wolfgang Panzerbeiter), 85, German-born American film actor who appeared in 330 films from 1905 to 1952

== August 17, 1958 (Sunday) ==
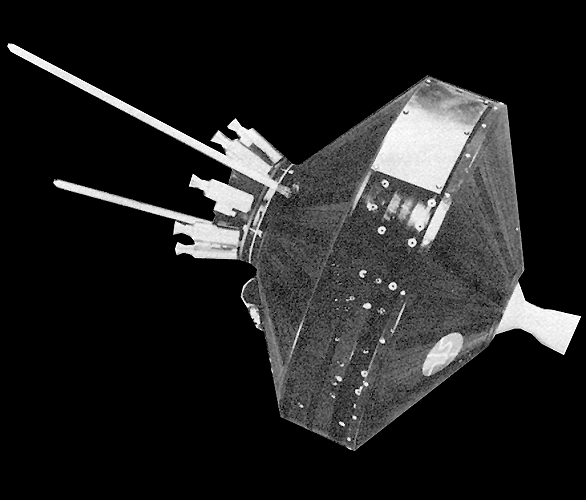
The first try at a lunar probe

- The first attempt from Earth to send a rocket to the Moon was made by the U.S. Air Force, which used a Thor intermediate range missile as the first stage of a rocket that had the Able portion of a Vanguard rocket as its second stage. The first "Thor-Able" rocket carried Able 1, a U.S. space probe designed to orbit, record and transmit data from lunar orbit, as its payload. After lifting off at 8:18 in the morning (1218 GMT) from Cape Canaveral, Florida, the rocket failed 73.6 seconds later at an altitude of 15,200 metres (49,900 ft), when the first stage of the Thor booster exploded. Air Force officials had cautioned the general public that "the chances of a complete success on this first try are about one in ten." During the rest of the year, six attempts to send a rocket to the Moon were made by the Soviets (on September 23, October 11, and December 4) and the Americans (October 11, November 8, and December 6), and all failed to reach orbit. The first success would be the Soviet Luna 1 on January 2, 1959.
- Born: Belinda Carlisle, American pop music singer for The Go-Go's and later a successful solo performer; in Hollywood, Los Angeles
- Died:
  - Bonar Colleano (stage name for Bonar William Sullivan), 34, American-born British stage and film actor, was killed in the crash of his sports car. Colleano was returning home from Liverpool hours after playing the lead role in the final scheduled performance of the play Will Success Spoil Rock Hunter?.
  - John Marshall, 82, British archaeologist who oversaw the excavations in the 1920s of the ancient Indus Valley civilization with expeditions to Harappa and Mohenjo-daro in Pakistan.

== August 18, 1958 (Monday) ==
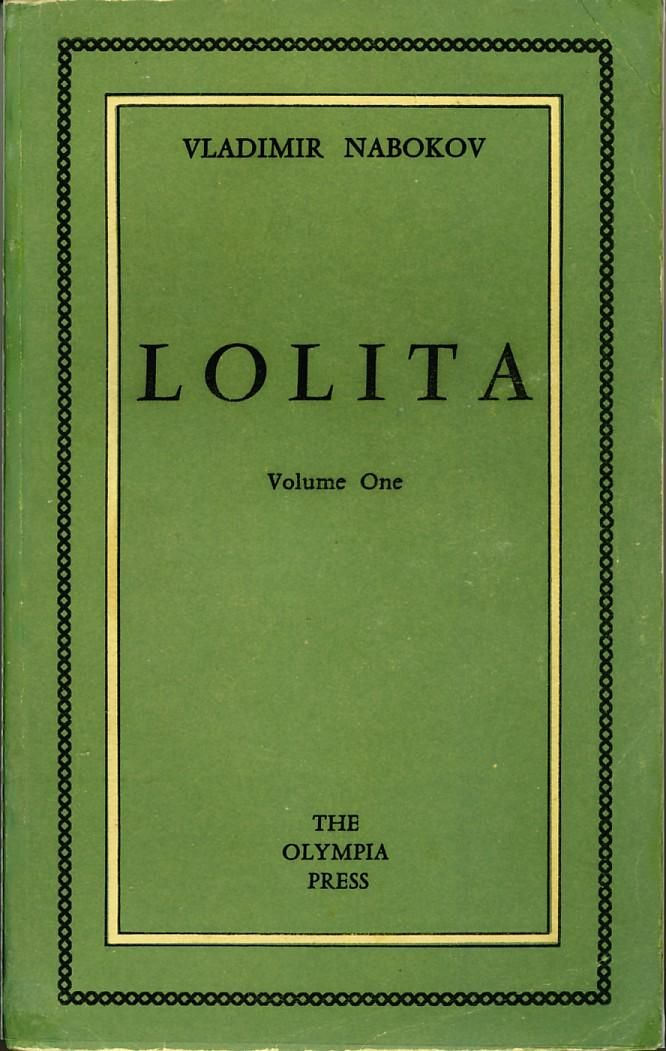

- Vladimir Nabokov's bestselling, but controversial novel Lolita was published in the United States, after a censored version had been published in France. A book critic for The New York Times wrote that Lolita "is undeniably news in the world of books. Unfortunately, it is bad news. There are two equally serious reasons why it isn't worth any adult reader's attention. The first is that it is dull, dull, dull in a pretentious, florid and archly fatuous fashion. The second is that it is repulsive."
- In the U.S., the 10th Circuit Court of Appeals reversed a federal judge's decision in Cooper v. Aaron, which had allowed the school board of Little Rock, Arkansas to resume the barring of black students from white schools, specifically Central High, where nine African-American students had been allowed to attend during the 1957–1958 school year under federal government protection. On June 21, U.S. District Judge Harry J. Lemley had found a delay of more than two years (until the 1961–1962 school year) to be acceptable under U.S. Supreme Court precedent. The 10th Circuit stayed the reintegration until an appeal could be made to the U.S. Supreme Court, which would uphold the principle that states must abide by the decisions of the high court under the terms of the 10th Amendment to the U.S. Constitution.
- Brojen Das from East Pakistan swam across the English Channel in a competition, the first Asian (and the first Bangali) to ever do it, and finished in first place ahead of 38 other competitors.
- Born: Reg E. Cathey, American character actor on film and television; in Huntsville, Alabama (d. 2018 from lung cancer)
- Died: Fritz Wagner, 68, celebrated German cinematographer, was killed when he fell off of a mobile unit in Göttingen, West Germany, during the filming of a scene in Ohne Mutter geht es nicht.

== August 19, 1958 (Tuesday) ==
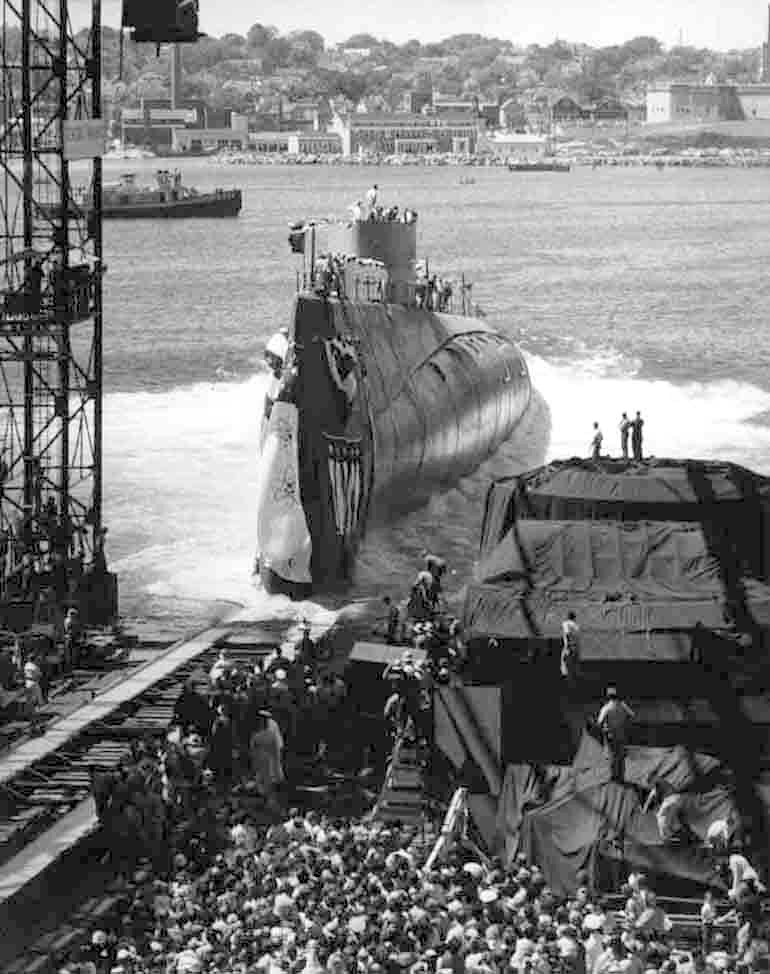
Launch of USS Triton

- USS Triton, the largest submarine ever built up to that time and the eighth U.S. atomic sub, was launched from the Electric Boat Company shipyard in Groton, Connecticut in front of a crowd of 34,000 people, with a notable exception. Triton remains the only U.S. submarine to be powered by two nuclear reactors.
- The Katz Drug Store sit-in began in Oklahoma City in the U.S. state of Oklahoma, where businesses were allowed by law to refuse service to African-Americans. Schoolteacher Clara Luper, her daughter and 11 students sat down at the drug store's lunch counter and ordered 13 soft drinks and, after being refused service, stayed at the counter for hours before leaving. They came back the next day, and on the third day, when the restaurant finally relented, prompting a series of sit-ins at other restaurants in the state's capital. The sit-in began one month after a similar campaign began to desegregate a chain of lunch counters in Kansas.
- Born:
  - Dr. Brendan Nelson, Australian physician and politician who was Leader of the Opposition in the Australian House of Representatives; in Coburg, Victoria
  - Bill Anagnos, American film and TV stuntman; in Rhinebeck, New York (d. 2019)

== August 20, 1958 (Wednesday) ==
- The first four-lane toll road in the U.S. state of Illinois, the 76 miles (122 km) Northwest Tollway, opened to traffic between South Beloit, Illinois (at the border with Wisconsin) and Chicago's O'Hare International Airport. In 2009, it would be renamed for 1931 Nobel Peace Prize winner Jane Addams.
- The Beamer Resolution, creating the Driver License Compact for U.S. states to enter into collectively in order to exchange traffic violation information without having to make individual agreements, was signed into law.
- U.S. President Eisenhower signed the Reciprocal Trade Renewal Act into law, calling it "a firm, forward step on the road to a stronger America in a world at peace" and giving the U.S. president authority to make agreements with other nations for mutual reduction of tariffs.

== August 21, 1958 (Thursday) ==
- Having escaped defeat by the Cuban Army in Operation Verano and the Battle of Las Mercedes, Fidel Castro's forces regrouped and began a new offensive in the provinces of the Sierra Maestra mountains, that would ultimately lead to victory by the end of the year.
- Chinese Communist Party Chairman Mao Zedong, leader of the People's Republic of China, announced at a meeting of the Party's Politburo that there would be no further enactment or amendment to China's civil or criminal laws, and halted further work on plans for a uniform code of laws for the nation. A code would not be adopted until more than 25 years later.
- Illinois began observing the centennial of the 1958 Lincoln–Douglas debates in ceremonies that would last until October 15.
- The decommissioned U.S. Navy aircraft carrier USS Enterprise, nicknamed "The Big E" and the most decorated U.S. ship of World War II, with 20 battle stars, was towed to a scrapyard in Kearney, New Jersey, after having been anchored at the New York Naval Shipyard in Brooklyn since 1947. A writer for The New York Times wrote, "Naval progress has succeeded in doing what the Japanese could never do. The mighty aircraft carrier Enterprise yesterday went to her grave." The Enterprise had survived the attack on Pearl Harbor and fought in the Pacific Theater during World War II at the Battle of Midway, the Battle of the Eastern Solomons, the Battle of the Santa Cruz Islands, the Guadalcanal Campaign, the Battle of the Philippine Sea, and the Battle of Leyte Gulf.
- Died:
  - Walter Schumann, 44, American music composer for film, television and theater, known for creating the instrumental theme for the radio and television show Dragnet, died of complications following open heart surgery.
  - Stevan Hristić, 73, Serbian Yugoslavian music composer
  - Kurt Neumann, 50, German-born U.S. film producer and director known for The Fly and Rocketship X-M.

== August 22, 1958 (Friday) ==
- U.S. President Eisenhower announced a conditional one-year moratorium on nuclear testing. The move came one day after a conference of international scientists in Geneva concluded that it would be possible to detect whether a nuclear explosion was taking place. Previously, the Soviet Union had agreed to halt its own testing if other nations with the atomic bomb did the same. Eisenhower's offer of a moratorium, conditional on the Soviets and the British halting testing as well, was made with the offer that it would take effect in 70 days, effective on October 31. During the rest of August, September and October, the three nations rushed to test as many weapons as possible.
- In the wake of the decision by France's premier Charles de Gaulle to transfer French colonies from high commissioners to local politicians, Philbert Tsiranana became President of the Executive Council of Madagascar. He would become the first President of the Malagasy Republic on Madagascar's independence in 1959.
- The popular Czech language science fiction film Vynález zkázy), directed by Karel Zeman and starring Lubor Tokoš, premiered in Czechoslovakia and was redubbed in nations around the world, including the United States in 1961, where it was titled Invention for Destruction.
- The popular Tamil language action film Nadodi Mannan (The Vagabond King), directed by and starring M. G. Ramachandran, premiered in India.
- Born:
  - Colm Feore, American-born Canadian film and TV actor; in Boston
  - Baba Suwe (stage name for Babatunde Omidina), Nigerian film actor and comedian; on Lagos Island (d. of diabetes 2021)
- Died: Roger Martin du Gard, 71, French novelist and winner of the 1937 Nobel Prize for Literature

== August 23, 1958 (Saturday) ==
- The Second Taiwan Strait Crisis began, with the People's Liberation Army's bombarding Quemoy (also called Kinmen), an island claimed by both the People's Republic of China and by the Republic of China on the island of Taiwan. From 6:30 in the evening to 8:30 local time, Communist China fired more than 40,000 artillery shells from the mainland base at Xiamen in the Fujian province. At the same time, the Chinese Navy set a blockade of shipments from the island of Taiwan to Quemoy and other islands.
- U.S. President Eisenhower signed the Federal Aviation Act into law, transferring all authority over aviation in the U.S. to the new Federal Aviation Agency (FAA) to replace the Civil Aeronautics Authority. The agency was later renamed the Federal Aviation Administration.
- President Eisenhower also signed legislation that granted lifelong government pensions for the first time to former presidents of the United States and to their widows. The only two living ex-presidents, Herbert Hoover and Harry S. Truman, received $25,000 per year (equivalent to $250,000 sixty years later), and two living presidential widows, Edith Galt Wilson and Eleanor Roosevelt got $10,000 pensions. The recipients also received furnished offices, a paid government assistant, and free postage on any correspondence or packages sent within the U.S.
- The St Ann's riots began between black and white British residents in St Ann's, Nottingham, and were a prelude to the Notting Hill race riot in London that began the next week.
- Yugoslavia's first television station, Radio Television Belgrade (RTB) began broadcasting. The first show was the news program Dvevnik ("The Journal") live from the opening of the Belgrade Fair.
- Marthwada University, now Dr. Babasaheb Ambedkar Marathwada University (BAMU) was dedicated in India by Prime Minister Jawaharlal Nehru at Aurangabad in India's Maharashtra state.

== August 24, 1958 (Sunday) ==
- France's President Charles de Gaulle spoke at an assembly in Brazzaville in the African colony of French Congo and outlined his plan for all French colonies in Africa to make the transition to full independence, and that a referendum would be held for the adult citizens in each of the future nations on September 28 on whether to join. A majority in each nation except for Guinea voted "yes" in the referendum.
- In the Turkish city of Bursa, a fire that began accidentally in a bookbinding shop destroyed 2,200 small businesses along with surrounding dwellings, and threatened the 500-year-old Grand Mosque. Cavit Chenrek, the owner of a small store where the fire began, said that papers had been ignited by a kerosene lamp that he used to heat glue and that he had been unable to extinguish it. Chenrek was subsequently arrested for the blaze, estimated to have caused one billion Turkish lira (equivalent to US$110 million) in damage.
- The United States launched the Explorer 5 satellite into orbit at 2:17 in the morning from Cape Canaveral but signals ceased after a few minutes and the satellite failed to reach orbit.
- United Press International reported that, earlier in the week at the city of Taez in Yemen, thousands of person watched the execution of Alwi Shah, who had beheaded hundreds of convicted prisoners in the Middle Eastern kingdom, including family members of the nation's ruler, the Imam Ahmad. Alwi Shah, convicted of the murder of a Taez man, died by decapitation in a public execution.
- Born: Steve Guttenberg, American film actor and comedian; in Brooklyn, New York City
- Died: J. G. Strijdom, 65, Prime Minister of South Africa since 1958

== August 25, 1958 (Monday) ==
- Instant noodles, commonly referred to as "ramen noodles", went on sale for the first time after Japanese entrepreneur Momofuku Ando developed a process for dehydrating noodles and packaging them as a block for future rehydration at home in boiling water. Ando's company, Nissin Foods, sold the packages under the name Chikin Ramen for 35 Japanese yen, equivalent at the time to about 12.5 cents in the United States.
- FLN (Front de libération nationale) the Algerian Arab independence group, took the Algerian War to France itself. At 2:30 in the morning, FLN saboteurs carried out simultaneous attacks in 20 locations, targeting oil refineries near Marseille and Notre-Dame-de-Gravenchon, gasoline storage tanks at Narbonne, Salbris and Carcassonne, a munitions factory in Paris, a railroad signal post and a truck manufacturer, and other locations in suburbs of Paris. The attacks killed at least seven people across France (including three policemen in France) and injured 21 others.
- The U.S. TV game show Concentration, which combined matching pairs of cards with solving a rebus puzzle, premiered on the NBC television network and began a run of more than 14½ years. The original host was Hugh Downs, later better-known as a newsman hosting NBC's Today show and ABC's 20/20.
- Born: Tim Burton, American film director and producer known for the 1989 revival of the Batman franchise, as well as The Nightmare Before Christmas; in Burbank, California
- Died: Leo Blech, 87, German opera composer and director

== August 26, 1958 (Tuesday) ==
- Voters in the U.S. Territory of Alaska overwhelmingly favored becoming residents of the 49th state of the United States in a referendum with three questions on the ballot. On the first question, "Shall Alaska immediately be admitted into the Union as a state?", the result was 40,452 in favor, and 8,010 against.
- The first nationwide labor strike in Paraguay was called by the South American nation's labor union, the Confederación Paraguaya de Trabajadores (CPT or Paraguayan Confederation of Workers) to demand as much as 30% increase in salaries, the end of the state of emergency declared by President Alfredo Stroessner, freedom to organize, and a declaration of amnesty to all labor union members criminally charged for violating emergency regulations. Stroessner's government originally offered a 15% increase, which a CPT committee rejected. The government then sent police and the Paraguayan Army to surround CPT headquarters, and 200 CPT trade union leaders were arrested.
- Died: Ralph Vaughan Williams, 85, British symphonic and opera composer

== August 27, 1958 (Wednesday) ==
- The Soviet Union accomplished the first successful return of animal passengers from a rocket launch, after sending two dogs to an altitude of 281 miles (452 km) without killing them. According to the TASS news agency, the dogs were named "Belyanka" ("Whitey") and "Pestraya" ("Many Colors"). Aerospace scientist A. M. Kasatkin said that the sealed capsule with the dogs had been on a rocket stage that had "special aerodynamic brakes and parachutes."
- After completing nuclear testing in the South Pacific Ocean, the United States began nuclear tests over the South Atlantic Ocean with the launch of Operation Argus.
- Born: Kathy Hochul, American politician and the first female Governor of New York, taking office in 2021 following the resignation of Andrew Cuomo, after having been Lieutenant Governor of New York since 2015; as Kathleen Courtney in Buffalo, New York

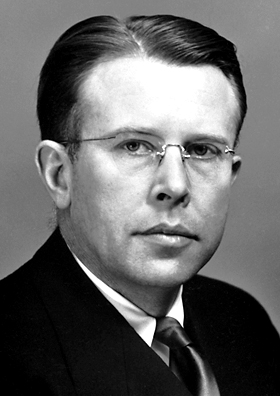
Lawrence

- Died: Ernest Lawrence, 57, American nuclear physicist and 1939 winner of the Nobel Prize in Physics, inventor of the cyclotron, died of ulcerative colitis. Element 103, lawrencium, would be named in his honor after its discovery in 1961 at the Lawrence Berkeley National Laboratory at the University of California.

== August 28, 1958 (Thursday) ==
- In Poland, 56 coal miners were killed in an explosion and fire at the Makoszowy Colliery near Zabrze. Another 52 miners were saved by rescuers. Police arrested two Makoszowy employees and charged them with deliberately starting the fire.
- Anticipating the Boeing 707 and other jet airplanes going into service at high altitudes, the Civil Aeronautics Board of the U.S. issued an order, effective September 1, that all airliners in the U.S. needed to be equipped with a supply of oxygen and oxygen masks for all passengers. The new rule went into effect as the 707 became the first jet airliner to be authorized to fly as high as 4,000 feet (1,200 m).

== August 29, 1958 (Friday) ==
- At a meeting of the Chinese Communist Party Politburo at the seaside resort of Qinhuangdao in Hebei province, the Party leaders of the People's Republic of China voted to approve the Resolution of Establishing People's Communes in Rural Areas in accordance with Chairman Mao Zedong's Great Leap Forward program to forcibly relocate private farmers to collective farm communes.
- Soviet Premier Khrushchev announced that the U.S.S.R. would meet with the U.S. and the UK on October 31 to formally agree for all three nations (at the time, the only ones on Earth that had nuclear weapons) to begin the voluntary moratorium on nuclear testing. With more than two months to continue testing before October 31, the three nuclear powers all scheduled multiple tests, including the U.S., which announced that it would conduct ten low-yield tests, most of them one kiloton or less.
- Karl-August Fagerholm became the new Prime Minister of Finland to replace the caretaker government of Prime Minister Reino Kuuskoski.
- The school board of Norfolk, Virginia voted, reluctantly, to integrate its schools and to assign 17 black children to previously all-white high schools and junior high schools. The move came after federal judge Walter E. Hoffman had indicated that he would hold the board members in contempt of court if they ignored his orders.
- Born:
  - Michael Jackson, black American pop music superstar and cultural icon; in Gary, Indiana (d. 2009)
  - Lenny Henry, black British comedian; in Dudley, Worcestershire

== August 30, 1958 (Saturday) ==
- Three days of race riots began between white and black Britons in Notting Hill, London. Majbritt Morrison, a white author from Sweden, was attacked by a group of white Britons (who called themselves "The Teddy Boys") and who had learned the night before that she was married to a black man from Jamaica, Raymond Morrison. London Police arrested her for obstruction of justice after she refused to leave the scene. When night fell, a mob of more than 300 white people began attacking the homes of black residents from the West Indies. Soon the number of people involved grew to 2,000. The disturbances continued every night until September 5, and 140 people were arrested. Nine young white men would later be convicted of crimes of violence and sentenced to five years in prison.
- Born: Jean-Paul Fouchécourt, French opera singer; in Blanzy, Saône-et-Loire département
- Died:
  - Alexander Albrecht, 73, Slovak-Hungarian composer of Slovak music, committed suicide.
  - Éric de Bisschop, 66, French ocean explorer, was killed when his balsa-wood raft, Tahiti Nut II, struck a reef near the Cook Islands, and broke up. The other four members of the crew were rescued.

== August 31, 1958 (Sunday) ==
- As Iceland prepared to extend its territorial waters from four nautical miles 4.604 miles (7.409 km) to 12 13.812 miles (22.228 km), four Royal Navy warships arrived within the new off-limits area to protect fishing trawlers.
- Died: George Fingold, 49, American politician and Republican candidate for Governor of Massachusetts, died of a heart attack the day after he resumed campaigning to unseat incumbent Governor Foster Furcolo. Fingold, unopposed for the nomination on the September 9 Republican primary, had been believed by political observers to be likely to defeat Furcolo in the November election.
