= September 1958 =

Month of 1958

<<	September 1958					>>
Su	Mo	Tu	We	Th	Fr	Sa
	1	2	3	4	5	6
7	8	9	10	11	12	13
14	15	16	17	18	19	20
21	22	23	24	25	26	27
28	29	30

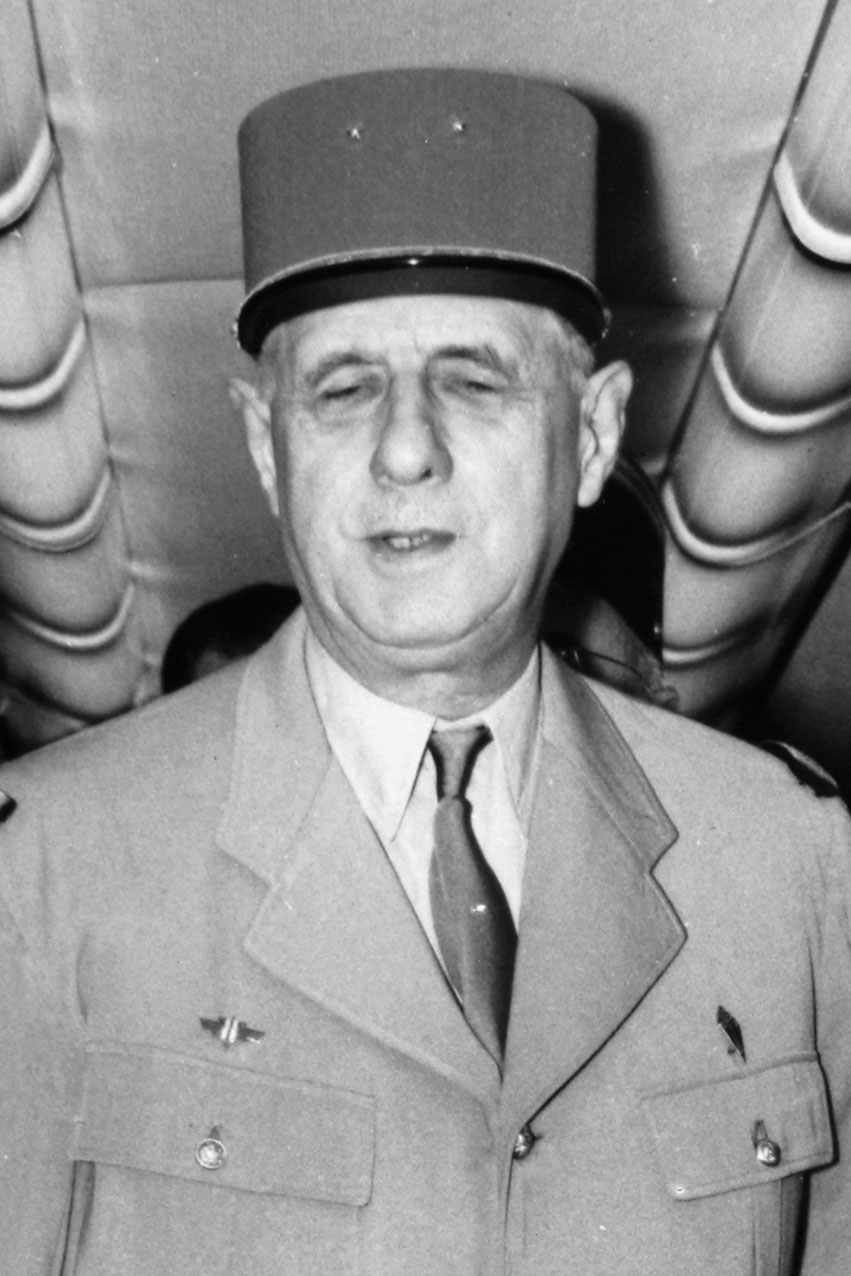
France's General Charles de Gaulle wins support of France and colonies

September 28, 1958: Referendum held simultaneously in France and 12 future nations on worldwide French Community

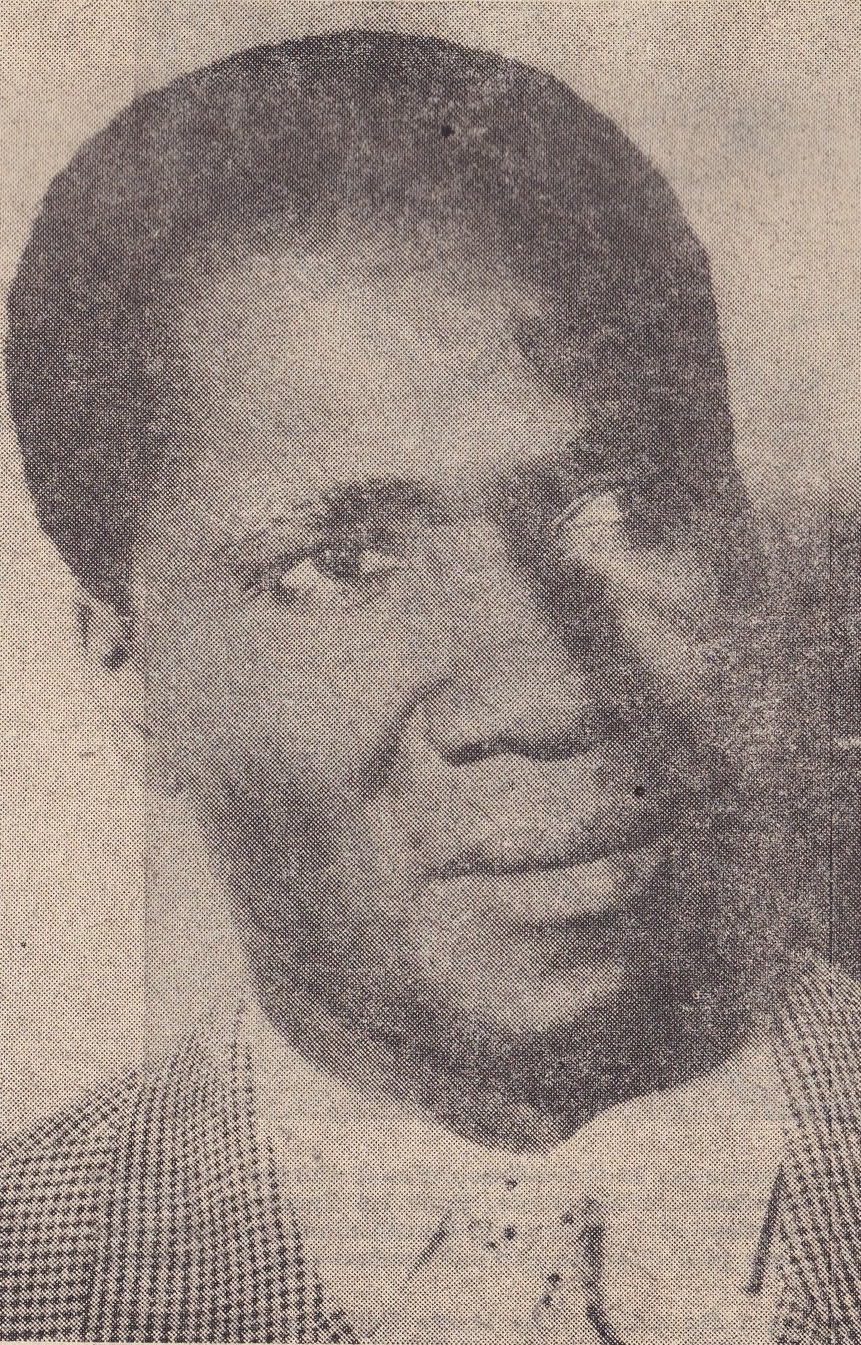
Sékou Touré defies de Gaulle, leads Guinea to reject France

The following events occurred in September 1958:

== September 1, 1958 (Monday) ==
- The first Cod War began between the United Kingdom and Iceland as Iceland's new 12-mile (19 km) fishing limits went into effect. Eleven British fishing trawlers ignored the ban, carrying out their operations within 6 miles (9.7 km) of Iceland, the former limit, and four Royal Navy frigates entered the area to prevent the seizure of the British fishing boats by the Gæslan, Iceland's Coast Guard. The first confrontation came when the anti-submarine warship HMS Palliser sailed, with guns manned, in front of an Icelandic guard ship as it was approaching British fishermen.

== September 2, 1958 (Tuesday) ==
- All 11 people on a U.S. Air Force C-130 plane were killed after the aircraft strayed across the border from Turkey and crashed in the Soviet Union, impacting 35 miles (56 km) northwest of Yerevan, capital of the Armenian SSR. The Soviet Foreign Ministry acknowledged on September 12 that the plane "fell" inside the Soviet border and that six crew members were killed, but made no mention of the fate of the other five. Eventually, the Soviets, who denied that the plane had been shot down, would return six bodies to the U.S. authorities. A statement from the Kremlin said, "The Soviet people understand the sufferings of the American citizens who have lost relatives and close friends. But it is not the Soviet Union that should be asked to reply to these people. We recommend asking those who gave the order to the United States plane to violate the border of the Soviet Union... They and only they are responsible for the plane's catastrophe."
- Regular television broadcasting began in the People's Republic of China at 6:30 in the evening as Peking Television (a predecessor of China Central Television) inaugurated three hours and 30 minutes of nightly programming. On May 1, Peking Television had made experimental broadcasts of two hours on an irregular basis. The 3 1/2 hour programming limit would continue for 20 years until 1978.
- The Navy of Taiwan (Nationalist China) and the Navy of the People's Republic of China (Communist China) fought a brief battle in the Taiwan Strait near the island of Quemoy, after eight Communist Chinese torpedo boats attacked a Taiwanese supply convoy. Taiwan's Defense Ministry said that two Communist torpedo boats were sunk in the first battle, and three more were downed 30 minutes later.
- All 19 people on a U.S. Military Air Transport Service C-124 cargo plane died when it crashed into the sea, five minutes after departing Guam on the last part of its trip to Clark Air Force Base in the Philippines.
- Hendrik Verwoerd, a staunch proponent of the policy of apartheid, became the new Prime Minister of South Africa after his parliamentary colleagues in the ruling National Party elected him as the new NP leader to succeed the late J. G. Strijdom. Verwoerd, the Minister of Native Affairs, was favored over two other candidates, Justice Minister and Acting Premier C. R. Swart, and Interior Minister Eben Dönges.
- As more formerly racially segregated school districts in the U.S. had different reactions to integration, the school district in Fulton, Kentucky, peacefully enrolled 20 African-American students to join the 161 White students at the small town's high school, after the town's mayor worked with local churches and other agencies to prepare the transition. At the same time, the school board of Arlington County, Virginia, refused to allow 30 black students to be admitted to its whites-only schools and Arkansas Governor Orval E. Faubus declared that he would close all schools before allowing racial integration.
- A man in Old Bridge Township, New Jersey, narrowly avoided death when a 70-pound (32 kg) block of ice fell from an airplane and crashed through his kitchen ceiling. Dominic Bacigalupo reported that he had left the kitchen seconds earlier, after preparing coffee, to watch a 9:00 pm TV program with his wife.
- Born: Zdravko Krivokapić, Prime Minister of Montenegro, 2020 to 2022; in Nikšić, SR Macedonia, Yugoslavia

== September 3, 1958 (Wednesday) ==
- The Tamil Language (Special Provisions) Act was passed in Ceylon (now Sri Lanka), providing for the use of the Tamil language as a medium of teaching in schools, the language for examinations for admission to the Public Service, and for use in state correspondence and administrative purposes in the nation's Northern Province and the Eastern Province. The legislation substantially fulfilled at least the part of the Bandaranaike-Chelvanayakam Pact of 1957 dealing with the use of Sinhalese, spoken by the majority of Sri Lankan residents, and Tamil, spoken by the Tamil minority.
- Died: Lieutenant-General Giffard Le Quesne Martel, 68, British Army officer and military engineer who was a pioneer in tank strategy in war time.

== September 4, 1958 (Thursday) ==
- Communist China proclaimed that its territorial waters were extended from 3 nautical miles (5.6 km; 3.5 mi) to 12 nautical miles (22 km; 14 mi) from mainland China and from the offshore islands of Quemoy, Little Quemoy, Matsu, Tatan, Ehrtan and Tungting.
- Jorge Alessandri received more votes than the other candidates in Chile's presidential election, but fell short of the requirement of receiving a majority of the votes cast, requiring the Chilean Congress to choose between Alessandri and runner-up Salvador Allende.

== September 5, 1958 (Friday) ==
- Canada's Prime Minister John Diefenbaker introduced his proposal for what would become the Canadian Bill of Rights, declaring in his speech to a joint session of the Canadian Parliament that "An Act for the Recognition and Preservation of Human Rights and Fundamental Freedoms" would "act as a landmark by means of which Canadians, through Parliament, would have redeclared those things which have made Canada great... the realization that wherever a Canadian may live, whatever his race, his religion or his colour, the Parliament of Canada would be jealous of his rights." The House of Commons gave a first reading of Bill C-60 and, pursuant to Diefenbaker's plan, withdrew the legislation so that the Canadian public could discuss the proposal. The Canadian Bill of Rights legislation would be re-introduced and be approved on August 10, 1960.

== September 6, 1958 (Saturday) ==
- The Food Additives Amendment of 1958 was signed into law by U.S. President Dwight D. Eisenhower as an amendment to the existing Federal Food, Drug, and Cosmetic Act, taking effect immediately. While non-toxic substances that were being added to food (such as preservatives or flavoring) prior to the law's passing were given the designation of "generally recognized as safe", new additives had to be evaluated by the Food and Drug Administration (FDA). The most notable amendment was the "Delaney Clause", named for the person who pushed for its inclusion, New York U.S. Congressman James J. Delaney, with the provision that "the Secretary of the Food and Drug Administration shall not approve for use in food any chemical additive found to induce cancer in man, or, after tests, found to induce cancer in animals," within limitations.
- Former Soviet Premier Nikolai Bulganin, who had been forced to resign on March 27, was removed from his post as a member of the ruling Politburo of the Communist Party of the Soviet Union, in a measure approved by the Party's Central Committee. The announcement was made by Radio Moscow, which also reported that the 21st Communist Party Congress would take place on January 27.
- The U.S. television show Wanted Dead or Alive, a Western starring Steve McQueen, premiered on CBS.
- Paul Robeson performed in concert at the Soviet Young Pioneer camp Artek.
- Born: Jeff Foxworthy, American comedian and TV actor; in Atlanta

== September 7, 1958 (Sunday) ==
- U.S. Navy warships escorted a Taiwanese convoy through the Strait of Taiwan in order to supply the island of Quemoy, which had been blockaded by the People's Republic of China. The heavy cruiser USS Helena (CA-75), like the other ships, escorted the Taiwanese freighters to within 3 nautical miles (5.6 km; 3.5 mi) of Quemoy and stayed in international waters.
- Tipperary won its second consecutive Gaelic Athletic Association hurling championship, defeating Galway, 4–9 to 2–5 (equivalent to 21 to 11 based on 3-point goals and single points), before a crowd of 47,000 people at Dublin's Croke Park.
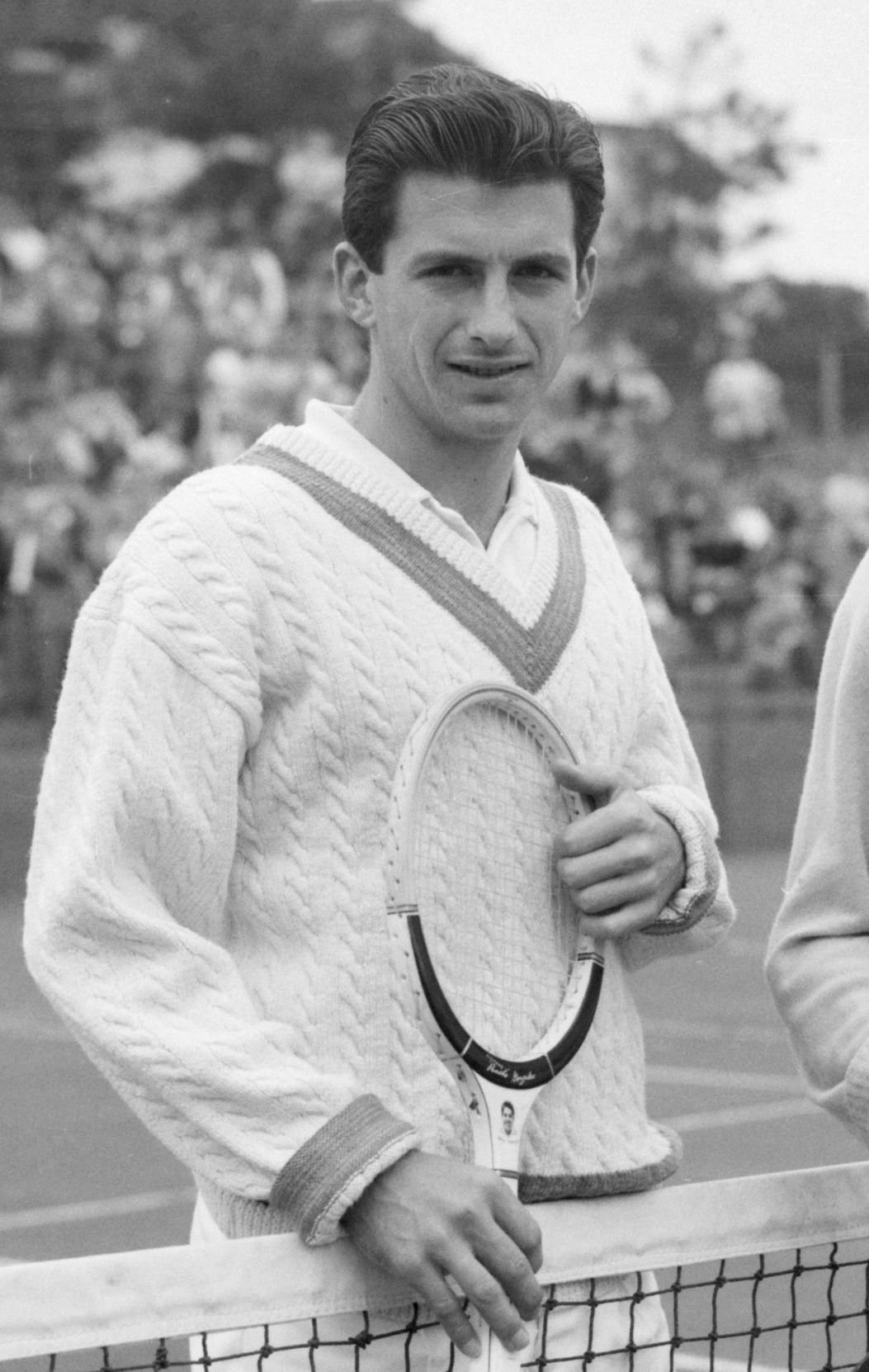
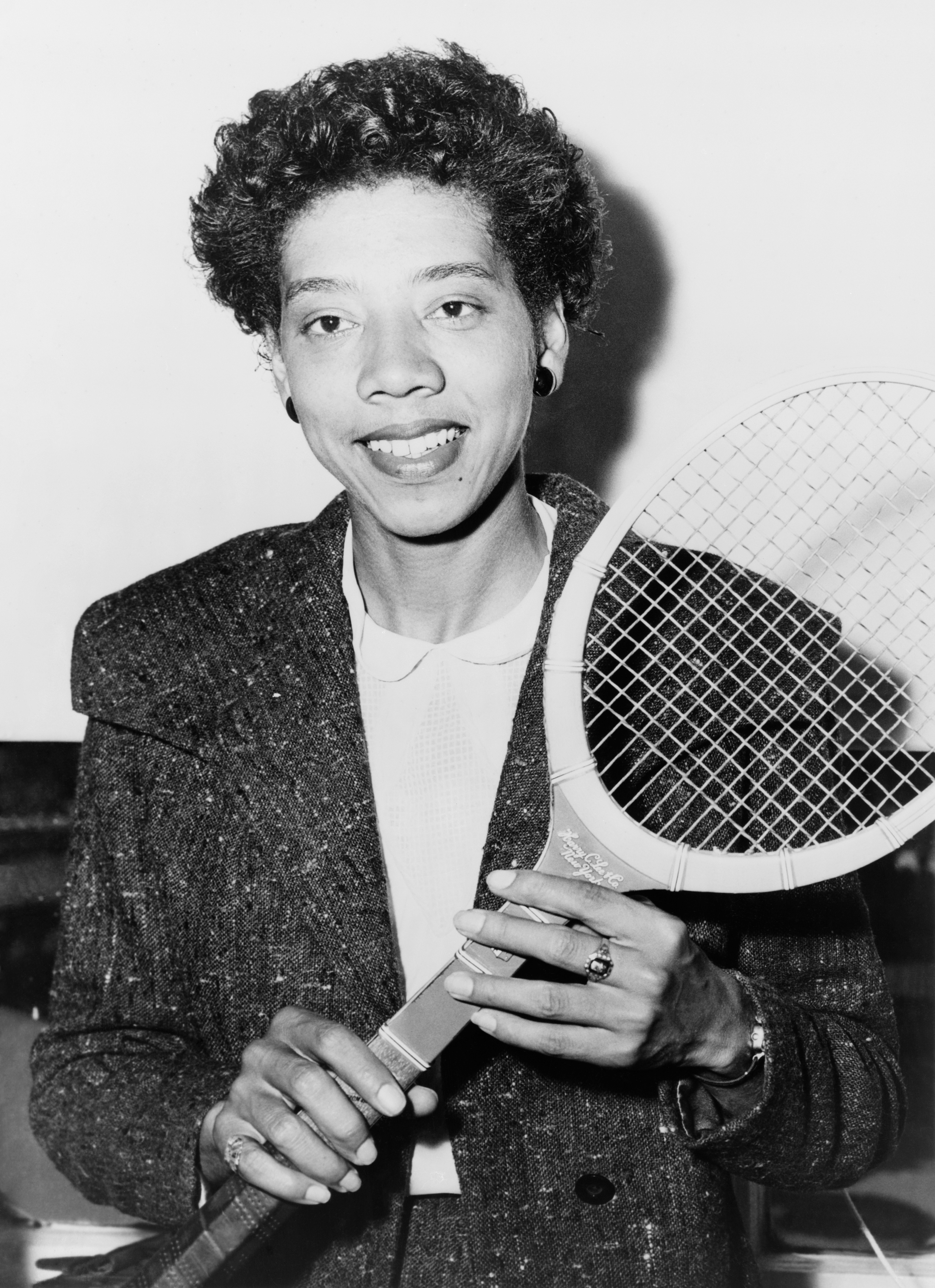
Tennis champs Cooper and Gibson
- Ashley Cooper of Australia won the men's singles title of the U.S. Open tournament, capturing three of the four Grand Slam tennis tournaments by beating Mal Anderson in five sets, 6–2, 3–6, 4–6, 10–8, and 8–6. Cooper won the Australian Open in January and Wimbledon in July. Althea Gibson of the U.S., who had also won at Wimbledon in May, defeated Darlene Hard 6–1 and 6–2, after having lost the first of three sets, 3–6.
- Born:
  - Danny Chan (stage name for Chan Pak-keung), Hong Kong pop music singer and actor; in Pok Fu Lam, British Hong Kong (d. 1993)
  - Joaquín Climent, Spanish TV actor; in Requena, Valencia
- Died: Daniel Ouezzin Coulibaly, 49, prime minister of the colony of French Upper Volta as president of the governing council. His successor, Maurice Yaméogo, would become the first President of Upper Volta (now Burkina Faso) upon the West African nation's independence in 1960.

== September 8, 1958 (Monday) ==
- The Islamic Republic of Pakistan purchased the port city of Gwadar, and the surrounding enclave of 309 square miles (800 km^{2}) of land, from the Sultanate of Oman for the amount of 5.5 billion Pakistani rupees, equivalent at the time to three million U.S. dollars (equivalent to $30.8 million 60 sixty years later). The area, across the Arabian Sea from the rest of Oman, had been Omani territory since its conquest in 1797.

== September 9, 1958 (Tuesday) ==
- The crash of a Flying Tiger Line cargo plane, a Lockheed L-1049 Super Constellation, killed all eight people on board. The chartered freight carrier was delivering supplies to Tokyo from Travis Air Force Base in the U.S., and crashed into the side of Mount Oyama.
- The first published criticism of Soviet author Boris Pasternak in the USSR, whose novel Doctor Zhivago had recently been published in the West, appeared in the official literary journal Literaturnaya Gazeta. Critic Viktor Pertsov, while not addressing the novel at that time, set up the condemnation of the author, writing about "the decadent religious poetry of Pasternak", which he said "reeks of mothballs from the Symbolist suitcase of 1908–10 manufacture."
- U.S. physicist Robert H. Dicke was awarded a patent for "Molecular Amplification Generation Systems and Methods", an outline for building an infrared laser.
- In fiction, September 9, 1958 is the date that Jake Epping, the protagonist in Stephen King's bestselling novel 11/22/63 travels to whenever he enters a time portal, with the ultimate goal of preventing the assassination of U.S. President John F. Kennedy. In the television adaptation for Hulu, 11.22.63, the date was altered to October 21, 1960 for purposes of telling the story over a three-year period rather than five years.
- Died: Saeed bin Maktoum bin Hasher Al Maktoum, 80, Emir of Dubai (now part of the United Arab Emirates, since 1912. He was succeeded the next day by his son, Rashid bin Saeed.

== September 10, 1958 (Wednesday) ==
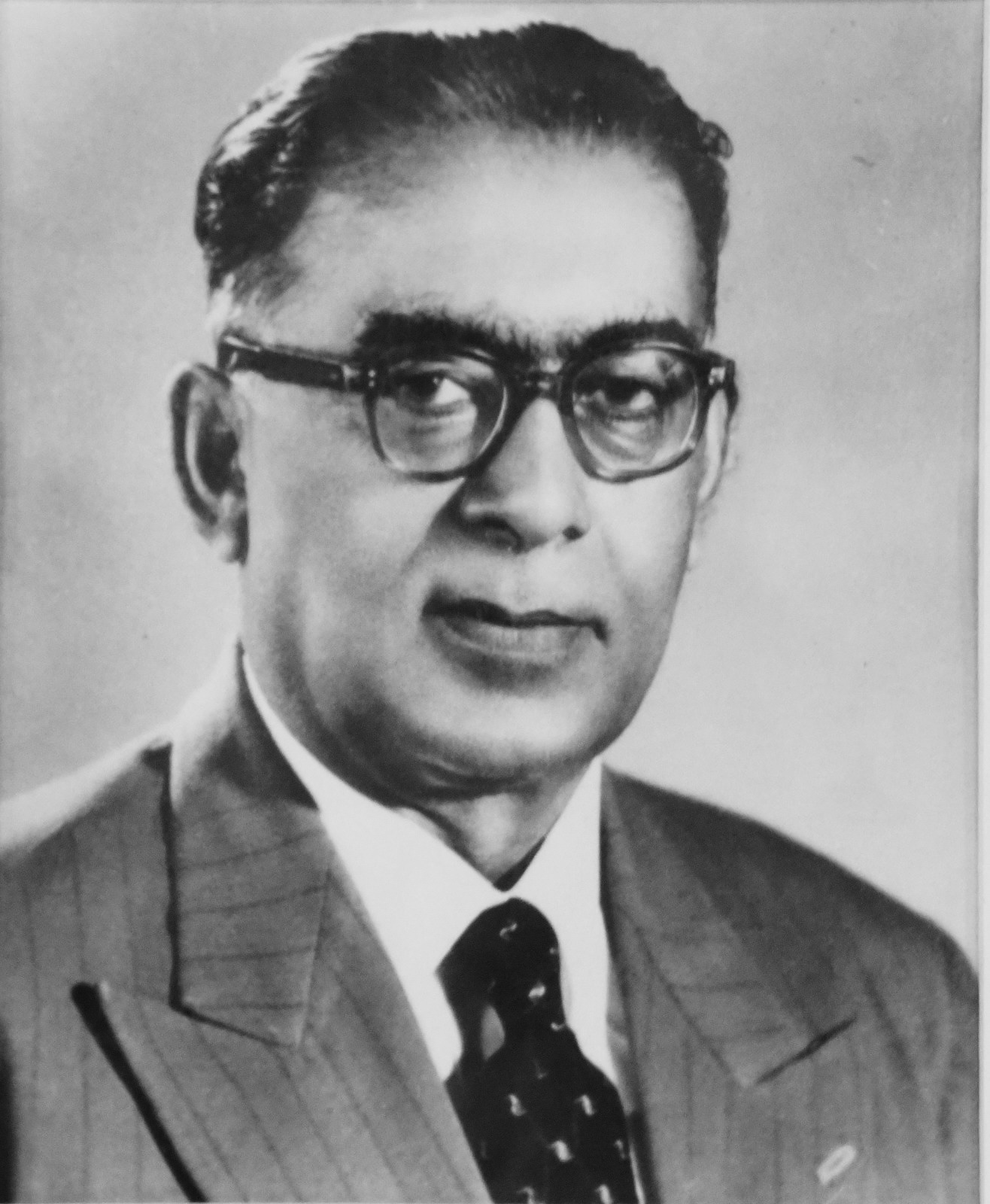
Pakistan's Noon and India's Nehru
- Pakistan's Prime Minister Feroz Khan Noon signed an agreement with India's Prime Minister Jawaharlal Nehru to divide a small 8.75 square miles (22.7 km^{2}) part of disputed territory, Berubari Union Number 12 between India's West Bengal state and East Pakistan (now Bangladesh). The district was split in half, with the southern portion going to East Pakistan and the northern portion to India.
- China began the final phase of removing thousands of homes in the area around Tiananmen Square and resettling the inhabitants as part of an urban renewal project to build a centralized capital district. Within thirty days, 16,000 homes were torn down, including 4,600 in the old Tiananmen Square section and 2,610 more to make way for the construction of the Great Hall of the People.
- Two U.S. high altitude reconnaissance planes flew over the mainland of China, drawing a protest from the Chinese Foreign Ministry protesting "a deliberate war provocation". The Xinhua news agency said that a U.S. Navy P5M-1 patrol plane had made a flight inland from the Taiwan Strait and over the Fujian Province from Quanzhou down to the city of Meizhou in the Guangdong province. Two hours later, Xinhua reported, an American U-2 spy plane had flown 200 miles (320 km) inland, reaching the Jiangxi province.
- Born:
  - Chris Columbus, American film director known for Home Alone and Mrs. Doubtfire; in Spangler, Pennsylvania
  - Siobhan Fahey, Irish singer and co-founder of the group Bananarama; in Dunshaughlin, County Meath
- Died:
  - Pearl Eaton, 60, American stage actress and choreographer, was found, beaten to death, in her apartment in Manhattan Beach, California. The murder case was never solved.
  - Norman G. Baker, 75, controversial U.S. radio broadcaster and promoter of an alleged cancer cure

== September 11, 1958 (Thursday) ==
- The Parliament of India enacted the Armed Forces (Special Powers) Act (AFSPA), authorizing the Indian government to allow extraordinary powers to the nation's military within designated areas of the country where public order needed to be restored. The original enactment was limited to the states of Assam and Manipur.
- The U.S. Federal Communications Commission set aside a frequency band reserved exclusively for citizens band radio, commonly called "CB Radio" or "CB", opening 23 channels within the 27 mHz frequency for use by truck drivers and non-trucking citizens.
- At an Army Advanced Research Projects Agency conference, the U.S. Army was advised there was little chance for approval of Project Adam, its human spaceflight proposal.
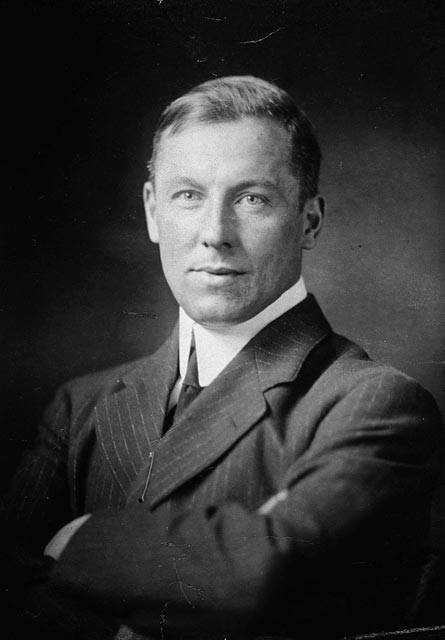
  Robert W. Service
- Died:
  - Robert W. Service, 84, English-born Canadian poet known for "The Shooting of Dan McGrew" and "The Cremation of Sam McGee", died at his retirement home in the French town of Lancieux.
  - Hans Grundig, 57, East German painter and graphic artist

== September 12, 1958 (Friday) ==
- Jack Kilby, an electrical engineer at Texas Instruments, gave the first demonstration of his invention, the integrated circuit. Kilby's circuit, made of germanium, was impractical to mass produce or to scale to a smaller size, and the silicon integrated circuit made by Robert Noyce of Fairchild Semiconductor would become the industry standard.
- In a unanimous decision in Cooper v. Aaron, the U.S. Supreme Court reversed a June 21 federal court ruling that would have allowed the school board of Little Rock, Arkansas, the right to delay racial desegregation for until September 1961. The formerly all-white Central High School in Little Rock had been required to enroll nine African American students for the 1957–1958 school year, and the Board had received authority from the lower court to exclude the black students for 1958–1959. In a reaction to the court decision, Arkansas Governor Orval E. Faubus issued a proclamation closing down all four high schools in Little Rock (Central High, R. C. Hall High, Little Rock Tech and the black high school, Horace Mann High), in order, he said, to stop "impending violence and disorder".
- In what German monarchists regarded as a royal wedding, Princess Felicitas of Prussia married Dinnies von der Osten. Felicitas was the older of the two daughters of the late Prince Wilhelm of Prussia, who had been second in line for the German throne after his father, Crown Prince Wilhelm.

== September 13, 1958 (Saturday) ==
- The fiery collision of two oil tankers, the French-registered GRT Fernand-Gilabert and the Liberian-registered SS Melika, killed 21 seamen in the Gulf of Oman.
- The first two-point conversion in American football took place in Cedar Falls, Iowa where the Iowa State Teachers Panthers hosted the Bradley Braves. An Iowa Teachers back, Max Huffman, carried the ball into the end zone after touchdowns twice in the Panthers' 29 to 12 win over the Bradley Braves. The new option for scoring had been adopted for NCAA for the 1958 college football season, and allowed team's the choice of getting two points after a touchdown by running or passing the ball to the end zone, rather than the one point kick.
- Died: Ruben Um Nyobé, 45, leader of the Union of the Peoples of Cameroon (UPC), was killed by the French Army in the rain forest where he was hiding, near his native village, Boumnyebel, after being shot several times. His body was then mutilated and buried in an unmarked grave.

== September 14, 1958 (Sunday) ==
- A steam train derailment killed 17 people on the Drachenfels Railway in West Germany.
- Three rockets designed by German engineer Ernst Mohr, the first launched from Germany since World War II, reached an altitude of 50 kilometres (31 mi) after being sent up from Cuxhaven in West Germany.
- In the first regular season Canadian Football League game to be played in the United States, the Ottawa Rough Riders defeated the Hamilton Tiger-Cats, 24 to 18, before a crowd of 15,000 curious fans at the 102,000-seat Municipal Stadium in Philadelphia.
- Radio actress Charlotte Manson suffered a paralyzing injury after falling down steps and sustaining a double fracture in her neck. After 10 weeks in the hospital, she began a surprising recovery while wearing a steel brace and returned to her role on the show This Is Nora Drake, finally being able to ambulate without the brace by February.
- Born: Jeff Crowe, New Zealand first-class cricket player with 193 appearances for the national team in Test cricket

== September 15, 1958 (Monday) ==
- A train accident killed 48 people near Bayonne, New Jersey in the U.S. after two locomotives and two passenger cars of the Central Railroad of New Jersey's train #3314 derailed and slid off of an open drawbridge and into Newark Bay. The locomotive crew passed through warning signals toward the visible gap left by the open bridge, which had parted to allow a ship to pass beneath, without attempting to stop. An autopsy showed that the train engineer had died from a heart attack rather than from injuries or drowning, but it was unclear why the fireman onboard did not attempt to stop the train. Engine 1532 also was equipped with safety devices that had not been activated.
- For the first time since a Communist government was established in China in 1949, ambassadors from both the United States and the People's Republic of China met to discuss future relations between the two countries. Both the U.S. and the PRC had embassies in Poland, and the meeting between Jacob D. Beam of the U.S. and Wang Ping-nan of China took place at the Myślewicki Palace in Warsaw.
- The Electoral Law Amendment Act, 1958 took effect in South Africa, lowering the voting age for white voters from 21 to 18. For the non-white majority of South Africans, who had much more limited power than white voters, the voting age under the Representation of Natives Act and the Separate Representation of Voters Act remained the same.
- Terrorists in Paris attempted to assassinate French Minister of Information Jacques Soustelle, an outspoken foe of Algerian independence, as he was being driven through the Place de l'Etoile. Soustelle sustained cuts from broken glass as his limousine was riddled with machine gun fire, and one bystander was killed.
- Born: Cher Wang (Wang Xuehong), Taiwanese entrepreneur and co-founder of the Taiwanese computer firms HTC Corporation and VIA Technologies; in Taipei

== September 16, 1958 (Tuesday) ==
- Charles Malik, the Foreign Minister of Lebanon, was elected President of the United Nations General Assembly by a vote of 45 to 31 against his opponent Mohammed Ahmed Mahgoub, Foreign Minister of the Sudan.
- Born: Jennifer Tilly (stage name for Jennifer Ellen Chan), American-born Canadian singer and actress; in Los Angeles
- Died: Alma Bennett, 54, American film actress during the silent era

== September 17, 1958 (Wednesday) ==
- The first episode of the popular Dutch television series Pipo de Clown was broadcast, premiering on the VARA Television Network in the Netherlands. It would be shown for almost 22 years, until April 19, 1980.
- A joint National Aeronautics and Space Administration/Advanced Research Projects Agency Manned Satellite Panel was formed. This panel, with the aid of technical studies prepared by the Langley and Lewis Research Centers and assistance from the military services, drafted specific plans for a program of research leading to human spaceflight.
- Born: Janez Janša, Prime Minister of Slovenia 2004–2008, 2012–2013 and 2020–2022; in Grosuplje, SR Slovenia, Yugoslavia
- Died: Herbie Fields, 39, American jazz musician, committed suicide.

== September 18, 1958 (Thursday) ==
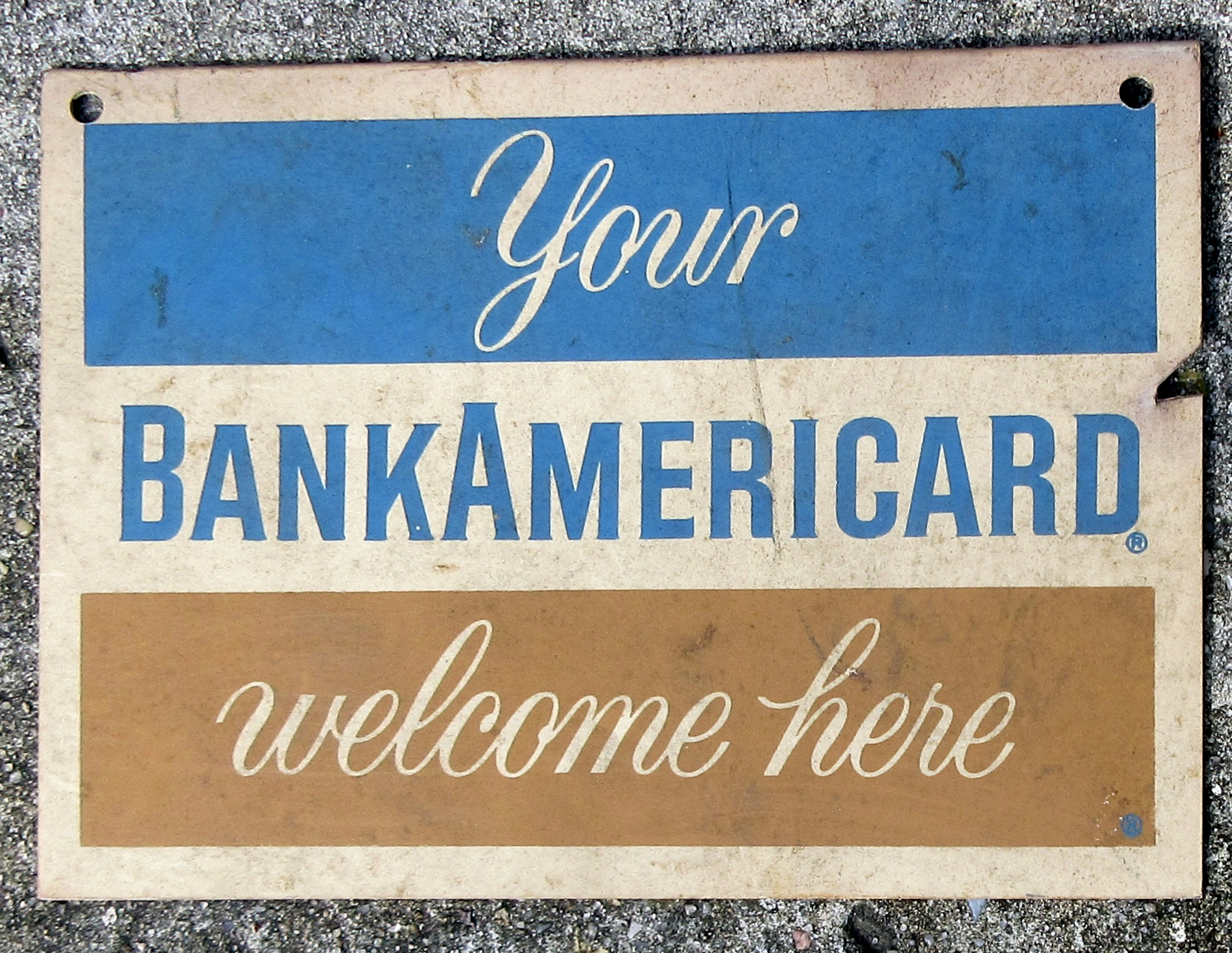
The Bankamericard, now VISA

- What is now the VISA Card was introduced as a credit card by the Bank of America with the name BankAmericard. The first cards were sent to 65,000 households in Fresno County, California after the Bank of America had made arrangements with more than 1,000 local merchants. Unlike other charge cards, which required the amount charged to be paid at the end of the month, the BankAmericard system introduced the concept of "credit card debt", where the customer had the option of making a minimum payment and agreed for the remaining balance to be an interest-bearing loan.
- The AIM-9 Sidewinder, a short range air-to-air missile, was used in combat for the first time. The United States had sold Sidewinder missiles to Taiwan's Republic of China Air Force (ROCAF) for use with F-86 Sabre jet fighters against the MiG-17 jet fighters used by Communist China's People's Liberation Army Air Force (PLAAF). The ROCAF said that it downed five MiG-17 jets in a dogfight over the Taiwan Strait.
- Interflug, the national airline for East Germany, was organized to replace Deutsche Lufthansa, set up in 1955 in East Germany at the same time that Lufthansa had been inaugurated in West Germany.
- Born: Rachid Taha, Algerian singer; in Saint-Denis-de-Sig, French Algeria (d. of heart attack, 2018)

== September 19, 1958 (Friday) ==
- Operating from Egypt, Algeria's Front de libération nationale (FLN, or National Liberation Front) organized the "Provisional Government of the Algerian Republic" to administer areas of French Algeria captured during the Algerian War of Independence, with Ferhat Abbas as the provisional president.
- Born: Lita Ford, English-born American singer and guitarist; in London

== September 20, 1958 (Saturday) ==
- Sami es-Solh quietly resigned as Prime Minister of Lebanon. He was secretly escorted out of the war-torn Middle Eastern nation by the U.S. Marines and helped to reach safety in Turkey.
- The crash at an air show of the prototype of an Avro Vulcan fighter jet killed seven people. All four of the crew died in addition to three people watching from the ground at RAF Syerston in Nottinghamshire in England.
- The Collingwood Magpies defeated the Melbourne Demons, 82 to 64, to win the Victorian Football League championship of Australian rules football.

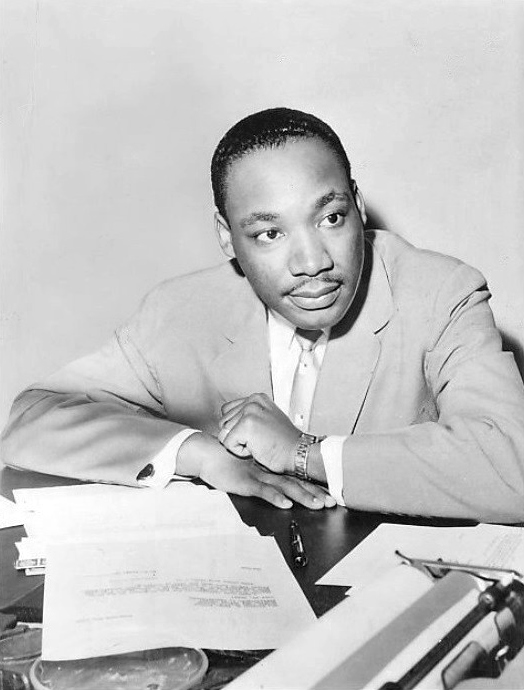
Dr. King, wounded in attempted assassination

- Izola Curry, an African-American woman, attempted to assassinate U.S. civil rights leader Martin Luther King Jr. by stabbing him with a 7-inch (180 mm) long letter opener. King was at Brumstein's Department Store on West 125th Street for a promotion and signing of his book, Stride Toward Freedom: The Montgomery Story. New York City police officers Al Howard and Philip Romano recognized the risk of pulling the knife out and raced him to Harlem Hospital. Careful surgery was required to remove the blade, which was touching his aorta. King was hospitalized for two weeks before being released on October 3.
- Born: Ines Paulke, East German pop music singer; in Gräfenthal, East Germany (committed suicide, 2010)

== September 21, 1958 (Sunday) ==
- A fight broke out on the floor of the East Pakistan Provincial Assembly, forerunner of the Parliament of Bangladesh, when the Deputy Speaker of the Assembly, Shahed Ali Patwary, announced that the Speaker of the Assembly, Abdul Hakim, had lost a vote of confidence and that a resolution declaring Hakim to be of unsound mind had passed. In the fight that followed, one of the assembly members threw an inkwell that struck Patwary on the head and fatally injured him. The violence that followed was used as a justification by Pakistan's President Iskander Mirza to declare martial law three weeks later on October 7, which was, in turn, followed by Mirza's overthrow on October 27.
- Born: Bruno Fitoussi, French professional poker player and 2001 world champion; in Paris
- Died: Peter Whitehead, 43, British race car driver, was killed during the Tour de France Automobile race when the car that he and his brother Graham were driving in broke a rotting bridge railing and plunged into a ravine in Lasalle, a village in the Gard département.

== September 22, 1958 (Monday) ==
- Sherman Adams, the top aide to U.S. President Eisenhower as White House Chief of Staff, resigned at Eisenhower's request after having been implicated in a scandal by accepting substantial gifts from a person who would benefit from federal contracts. Republican Party leaders had called upon Adams to leave before the 1958 midterm Congressional elections.
- With all four of its public high schools closed by order of Governor Orval Faubus, the school board of Little Rock, Arkansas, transferred its classes to the city's three television stations. Since each station's two-hour programming block (four half-hour instruction sessions) was confined to a single high school grade (10th, 11th or 12th), the city's White and African-American high school students had the same instructors.
- The TV detective series Peter Gunn, known for its famous theme and as the first show to feature a created for television detective, rather than one adapted from a book, radio show, or film, premiered on the NBC network in the U.S. Craig Stevens starred in the title role, and Lola Albright portrayed Gunn's girlfriend. A critic for The New York Times described the show as "completely without sense or taste" and as a "shabby filmed offering about the preposterous adventures of a freelance sleuth... a series of acts of violence puncturated by absurd dialogue." The show would run for three seasons.
- Born:
  - Andrea Bocelli, Italian opera tenor; in Lajatico
  - Joan Jett (stage name for Joan Marie Larkin), American singer known for Joan Jett and the Blackhearts; in Wynnewood, Pennsylvania
  - Granville Rodrigo, Sri Lankan film and TV star; in Colombo, Ceylon (died following car accident, 1999)
- Died: Mary Roberts Rinehart, 82, American mystery novelist known for the 1908 book The Circular Staircase and as the originator of "Had I but known" method of storytelling.

== September 23, 1958 (Tuesday) ==
- Fouad Chehab began a six-year term as the new President of Lebanon in a peaceful transition of power at the expiration of Camille Chamoun's term, while a 24-hour curfew was enforced by the U.S. military presence during the ongoing Lebanese Civil War.
- Following the failed August 17 U.S. attempt to launch a lunar probe, the Soviet Union made its first attempt to send an unmanned probe to the Moon, launching Luna E-1 No.1 from the Baikonur Cosmodrome at 1:40 in the afternoon local time (0740 UTC) on a Luna rocket. The rocket disintegrated 92 seconds after launch. During the rest of the year, two more attempts to send a rocket to the Moon were made by the Soviets (on October 11 and December 4) and by the Americans (October 11, November 8, and December 6), and all failed to reach orbit. The first success would be the Soviet Luna 1 on January 2, 1959.
- The United Kingdom's Operation Grapple series of nine atmospheric nuclear tests came to an end with the detonation of a 25-kiloton warhead 1,480 feet (450 m) near the Pacific atoll of Christmas Island.
- Died:
  - Walter F. Otto, 84, German linguist and historian of Greek mythology, known as the author of The Homeric Gods
  - Alfred Piccaver, 74, English-born American operatic tenor

== September 24, 1958 (Wednesday) ==
- The first airliner to be designed by and built in the People's Republic of China, the Beijing 1, made its inaugural flight, one week in advance of the ninth anniversary of the founding of the People's Republic.
- The AIM-9 Sidewinder air-to-air missile was first used in combat, as F-86 fighter jets of the Republic of China Air Force fired Sidewinders against MiG-17 fighters of the Communist Chinese air force in aerial fighting during the Second Taiwan Strait Crisis.
- The first test of the U.S. Polaris missile, designed for firing from underwater submarines, was made from the launch pad at Cape Canaveral. While the launch was successful, the missile had to be destroyed by remote control after it "appeared to be heading down the coast instead of out to sea". The rocket broke into two sections at an altitude of 50,000 feet (15,000 m), with the larger chunk crashing "only a few yards from the Polaris launching pad" and the other falling into the Banana River lagoon 5 miles (8.0 km) south of the launch site. Four subsequent tests would fail as well before the successful sending of a Polaris to a target on April 20, 1959.
- Rashid Karami, a Muslim and a former leader in the rebellion against the government of Lebanon earlier in the year, was named by President Fouad Chehab to be the new Prime Minister of Lebanon at the head of a cabinet of ministers that included three other Muslims, four Christians, and a Druze Muslim.
- Meetings began in Washington, D.C., and would continue through October 1, with Robert R. Gilruth serving as chairman to draft plans for a program to put an American into outer space. Others attending included Alfred J. Eggers, Maxime A. Faget, George Low, Warren J. North, and Walter C. Williams.

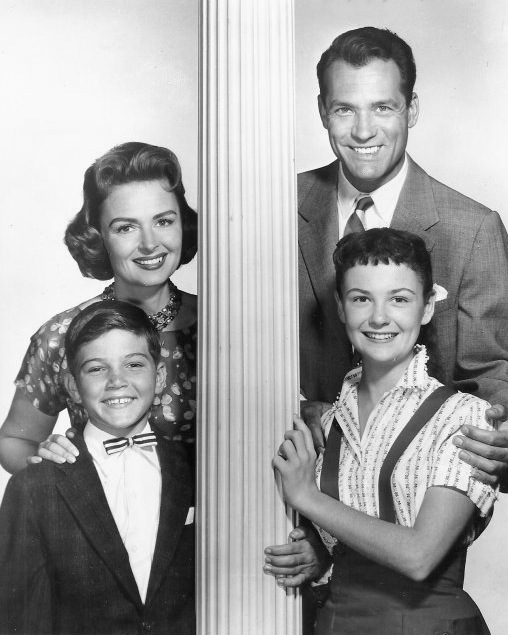
"Donna Stone" and family

- The Donna Reed Show, a family TV comedy starring film actress Donna Reed, premiered in the U.S. on the ABC television network and began an eight-season run. UPI TV critic William Ewald noted that, "Like almost all of TV's situation comedies, the new show is child-centered. But the trouble with centering 39 plots each season around kids is that they are not THAT interesting. As a result, after you've watched half-a-dozen situation comedies— complete with hack gags— you've seen them all." Cecil Smith of the Los Angeles Times wrote, "It's not a bad little show, well produced by Screen Gems and very reminiscent of that company's high-rated effort, Father Knows Best. Matter of fact, it is so reminiscent that they should have called the series Mother Knows Best."
- In Italy, the Lazio soccer football team defeated ACF Fiorentina, 1 to 0, to win the Coppa Italia, the annual knockout cup competition for the Federazione Italiana Giuoco Calcio (FIGC). Lazio had lost more games than it had won and finished in 12th place in regular play in Serie A (10 wins, 10 draws, 14 losses), while Fiorentina had a 16–11–7. Lazio had reached the finals after a 2 to 0 upset of the first-place regular winner, Juventus FC (23–5-6).
- Born: Kevin Sorbo, American TV and film actor known as the star of the series Hercules: The Legendary Journeys; in Mound, Minnesota

== September 25, 1958 (Thursday) ==
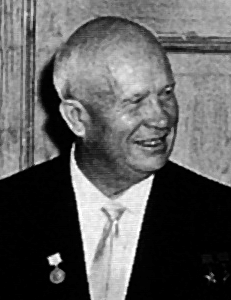
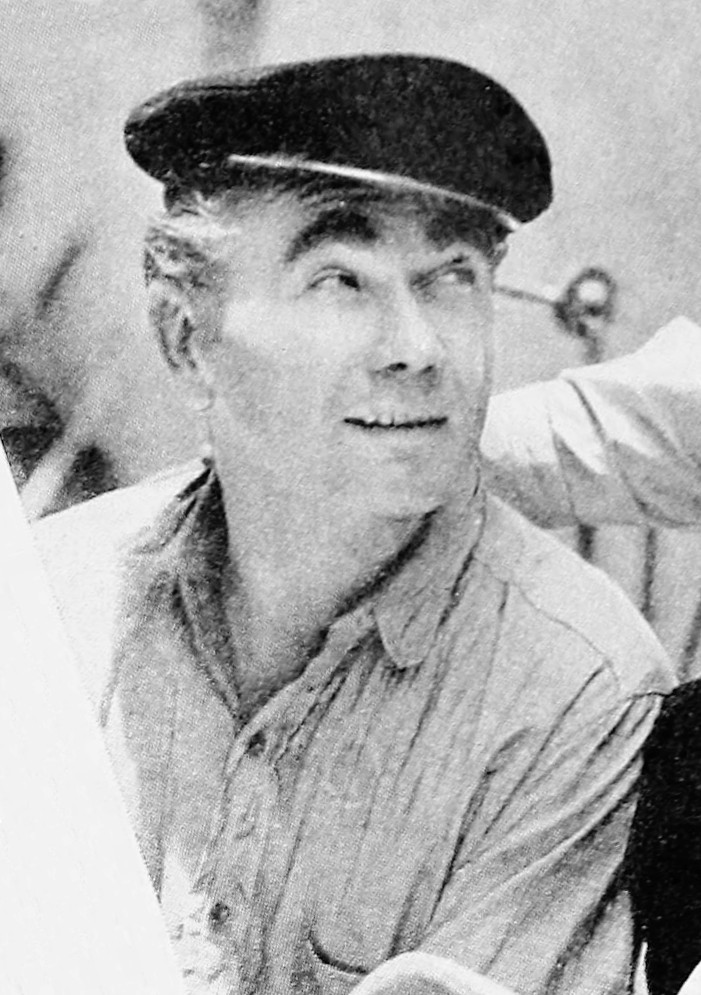
Nikita Khrushchev, actor Oskar Homolka
- The U.S. television network CBS, as part of its Playhouse 90 anthology program, telecast a made-for-TV play, "The Plot to Kill Stalin", prompting an angry response from the Soviet Union, which ordered CBS to close its Moscow news bureau and expelled its journalists from the country. The international incident was a result of the depiction of the Soviet premier Nikita Khrushchev in the play and the suggestion that he had been part of a plot to kill Soviet Premier Joseph Stalin in 1953. Jack Gould of The New York Times wrote, "As a theatrical work, the play was distinguished by excellent performances by Oskar Homolka as Khrushchev and Melvyn Douglas as Stalin... Quite another matter, however, was the wisdom of showing as virtually a murderer the head of a foreign state with which this country maintains formal, if very strained relations. In the play it was Mr. Khrushchev, identified throughout by name, who denied the necessary stimulant after Stalin's collapse."
- Dr. T. Keith Glennan, NASA Administrator, announced publicly that NASA would be activated on October 1, 1958.
- Born: Eamonn Healy, Irish-born American computational chemist and co-author of the Austin Model 1 (AM1); in Newcastle West, County Limerick
- Died: John B. Watson, 80, American pioneer in behavioral psychology

== September 26, 1958 (Friday) ==
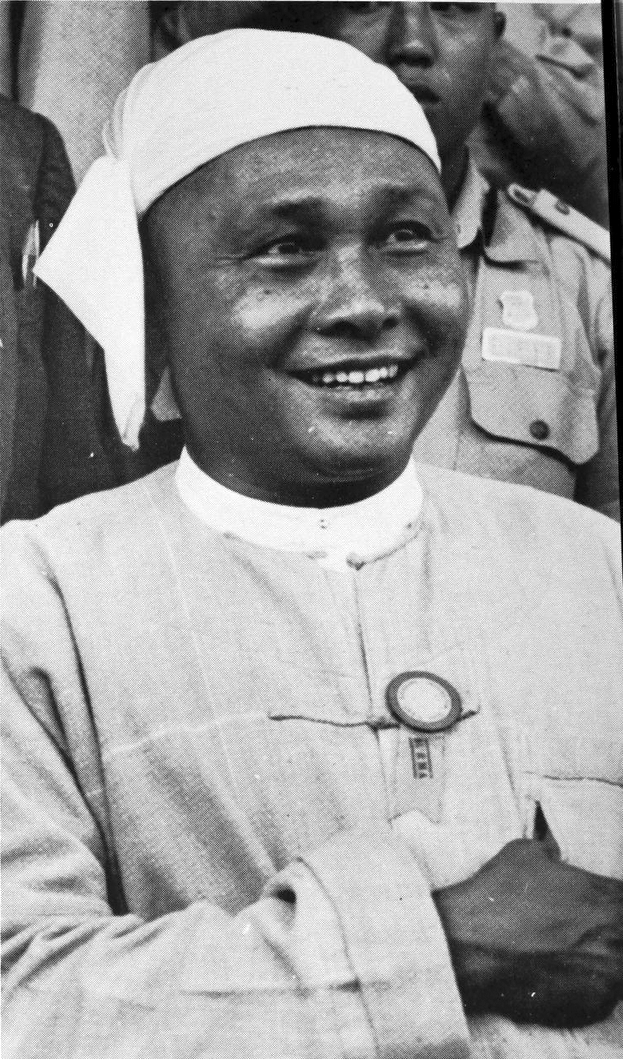
U Nu
- The Army of Burma (now Myanmar), led by General Ne Win, carried out a bloodless coup d'etat against the civilian government of Prime Minister U Nu, on the stated premise of preventing the Asian nation from falling under Communist control in the scheduled November parliamentary elections. Premier Nu told General Ne Win that he would ask Burma's President Win Maung to summon parliament for October 28, at which time Nu would resign and the General would be named Premier. Nu and Ne Win agreed to schedule new general elections before April 30.
- Three days of voting on the proposed French constitution opened in French Algeria for European and Arab Algerians alike. The balloting was spread out over multiple days because of the dispersal of voting locations in the vast North African colony.

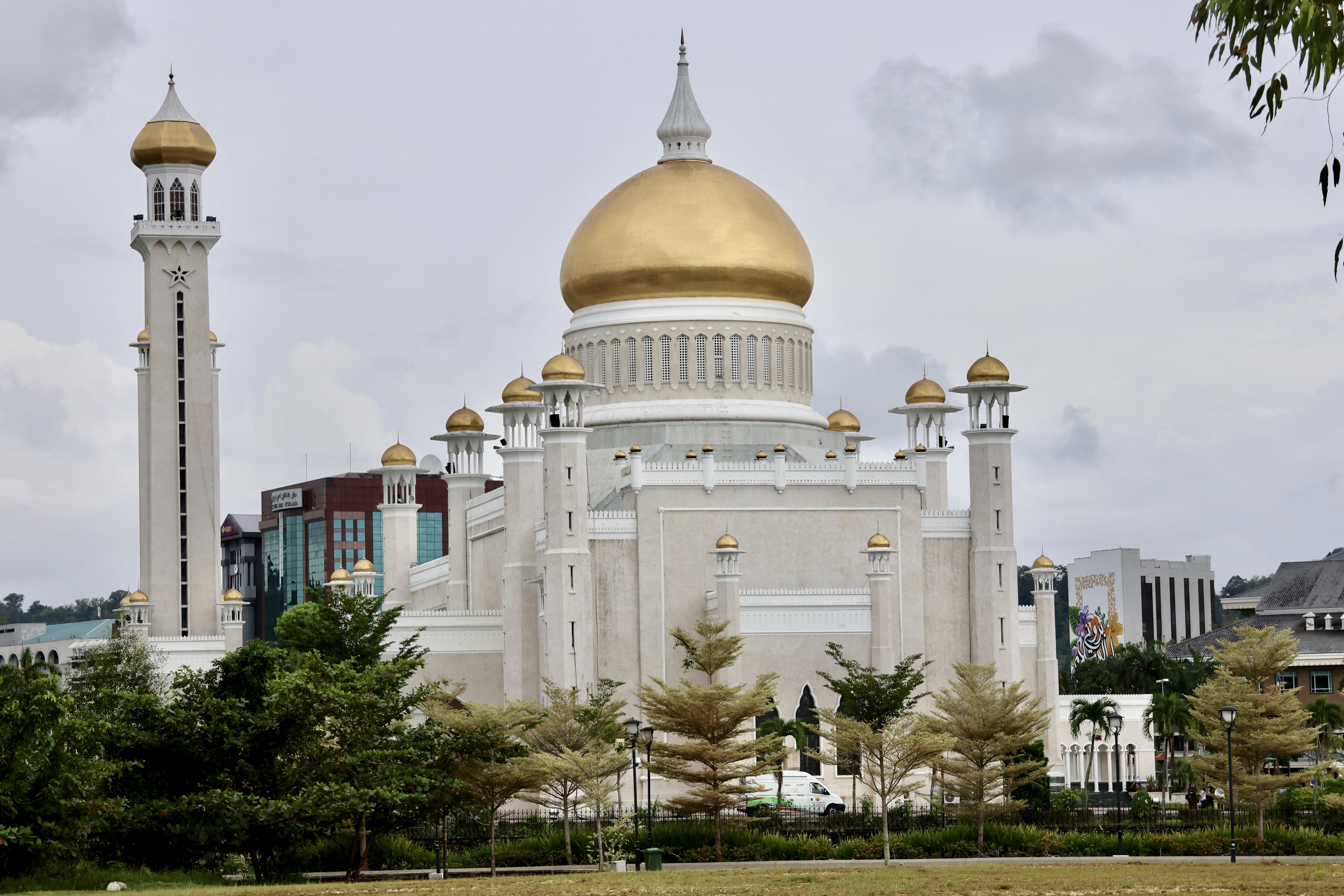
The mosque in Brunei

- The Omar Ali Saifuddien Mosque, national mosque of the Sultanate of Brunei, was inaugurated at the nation's capital, Bandar Seri Begawan.
- In Newport, Rhode Island, the United States and the New York Yacht Club won the America's Cup yachting competition for the 17th consecutive time as the yacht Columbia, helmed by Briggs Cunningham, finished ahead of the British challenger from the Royal Yacht Squadron, Sceptre, skippered by Graham Mann, for the fourth win in the best-4-of-7 series.
- Chi Chi, a Chinese giant panda, arrived at London Zoo and became one of the zoo's most popular attractions.
- The U.S. rocket Vanguard SLV-3 and its payload, the Vanguard 2D satellite, were launched from Cape Canaveral, but the mission failed after the second stage separated prematurely and the third stage failed to reach the planned orbit. Vanguard 2D made one orbit of the Earth before returning to the atmosphere and burning up over Central Africa.
- Born: Kenny Sansom, English soccer football left-back with 86 games for the England national team; in Camberwell, London.

== September 27, 1958 (Saturday) ==
- The Kanogawa Typhoon, referred to in the U.S. as "Typhoon Ida", killed 1,269 people on Japan's Honshū Island.
- Retired U.S. Army Major General Wilton Persons, who held the title of Deputy Assistant to the President of the United States, agreed to become the new White House Chief of Staff for U.S. President Eisenhower, replacing Sherman Adams.
- In a special referendum in Little Rock, Arkansas, where most of the registered voters were white, a proposal to reopen the city's four high schools on a desegregated basis was overwhelmingly rejected, with only 7,565 for and 19,470 against. The city's all-white voting precincts were heavily against integration, while predominantly black precincts were in favor.
- Born:
  - Shaun Cassidy, American pop music singer, TV actor and producer; to actors Shirley Jones and Jack Cassidy in Santa Monica, California
  - Irvine Welsh, Scottish novelist and author of Trainspotting; in Leith, Midlothian
- Died:
  - Rose Stradner, 45, Austrian-born U.S. film actress, committed suicide
  - Adolfo Salazar, 68, Spanish composer and musicologist

== September 28, 1958 (Sunday) ==
- In France voters overwhelmingly approved a new constitution that created the Fifth Republic, with the office of the President of France to have more power. In Metropolitan France (separate from French Algeria), the new constitution was approved by a 4 to 1 vote. Referendums were also held in all of the African colonies of France, as well as some of its territories in the Pacific Ocean and in North America, on the issue of whether to become independent or whether to join the new French Community. In addition to metropolitan France's (with 43 million people), the voting was held in French Algeria (9 million), French West Africa (comprising Senegal, Mauritania, the French Sudan, Guinea, Niger, the Ivory Coast, Upper Volta, and Dahomey with 17 million), French Equatorial Africa (Gabon, the French Congo, Chad and Ubangi-Shari with 4.4 million), Madagascar (4.4 million), Martinique, Guadeloupe, French Guiana, Reunion, the Comoro Islands, French Somoliland, New Caledonia, French Polynesia and Ste. Pierre et Miquelon.
- In French Algeria, most Muslim voters participated in the balloting despite calls from the National Liberation Front for a boycott, and the returns showed 96% in favor of being part of the French Community.
- All of the colonies agreed except for the nation of Guinea, where voters overwhelmingly opted for independence by more than 95%.
- Born: Rob Manfred, American sports executive who became the Commissioner of Baseball in 2015; in Rome, New York.

== September 29, 1958 (Monday) ==
- In the wake of the vote in the French African colony of Guinea against participation in the French Community, France's Prime Minister Charles de Gaulle informed Guinea's Prime Minister Ahmed Sékou Touré in a note that France would immediately withdraw all further aid. Jean Risterucci, a high-ranking official of France's Minister of the Overseas, arrived in Guinea's capital, Conakry, with de Gaulle's statement that "Guinea can no longer normally receive the aid of the administration of the French state or of funds for equipment." De Gaulle had previously warned that colonies that wished to secede from the French Community would do so "at their own risk and peril."
- After receiving letters from around the world asking for clemency, Alabama Governor James E. Folsom commuted the death sentence of Jimmy Wilson, who had been scheduled to die in the electric chair for robbing $1.95 in a burglary. While the victim, an 82-year-old white woman in Marion, Alabama, was unhurt, Alabama law at the time made burglary of a house at night a capital offense. Wilson, a 54-year-old African American, had been set for an October 24 execution date in the electric chair at Kilby Prison. Folsom commuted the sentence to life imprisonment. Wilson would serve 16 years in prison until being paroled in 1973.
- Born:
  - Tom Buhrow, German journalist and anchorman for the ARD program Tagesthemen; in Troisdorf, Nordrhein-Westfalen state, West Germany
  - Eduardo Cunha, Brazilian politician and leader of the Brazilian Chamber of Deputies 2015 until his arrest in 2016; in Rio de Janeiro

== September 30, 1958 (Tuesday) ==
- The Soviet Union resumed nuclear bomb testing after a six month voluntary suspension that had started on March 31. The move came after the U.S.S.R., the U.S. and the UK agreed on a mutual October 31 moratorium date. On August 22, Soviet premier Nikita Khrushchev had accepted the proposition of a three-party agreement, specifically retracting the suspension so that the Soviets could join the U.S. and the UK in making final tests before the end of October. The Tokyo Meteorological Board detected abnormal changes in atmospheric pressure, consistent with the explosion of a medium-size hydrogen bomb in the Arctic, shortly after 10:00 pm local time.
- The U.S. Army's experimental solar furnace, capable of concentrating the Sun's rays to generate "a pulse of heat almost as searing as that produced by a nuclear explosion," was demonstrated in a press conference at the Quartermaster Research and Engineering Command (QREC) in Natick, Massachusetts. The QREC furnace was designed to concentrate the sun's rays by a factor of 12,780 by focusing the rays "from 1,420 square feet into a four-inch square" (or from 1,320,000 square centimeters to 103 square centimeters). Lieutenant General Arthur Trudeau pushed a button to activate the device and "a piece of paper... pasted across a cutout in the shape of the mushroom cloud of a nuclear blast... disintegrated in a flash". Further demonstrations were stopped due to the solar furnace's limitations, because "a few moments later the clouds obscured the sun for the rest of the day."

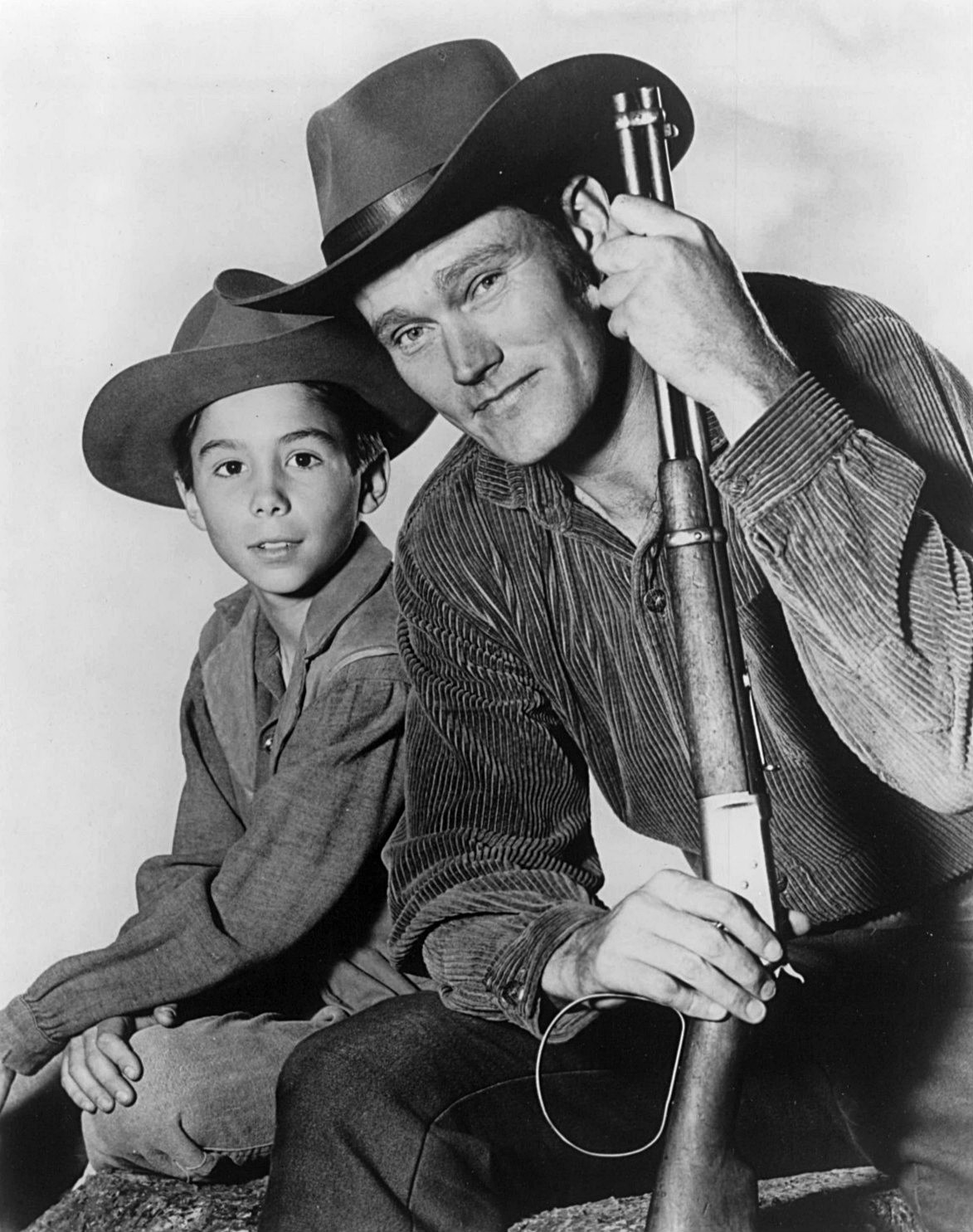
Connors and Crawford as Lucas and Mark McCain

- The Rifleman, starring Chuck Connors and child actor Johnny Crawford in the roles of a single father and his son in the old West, premiered in the U.S. on the ABC television network and began a five season run. The 30-minute first episode was actually an edited version of the one-hour telecast of "The Sharpshooter", the March 7 episode of Zane Grey Theatre on CBS, prompting critic John P. Shanley of The New York Times to comment, "The American Broadcasting Company should be reminded that the rerun season has ended." Matt Messina of New York's Daily News wrote that "Chuck Connors seems to have a winner," and added that "Human interest, highlighted by Connors' love for the boy, plays a major part in the story line, which is refreshing in Westerns."
