= 1958 Paraguayan general strike =

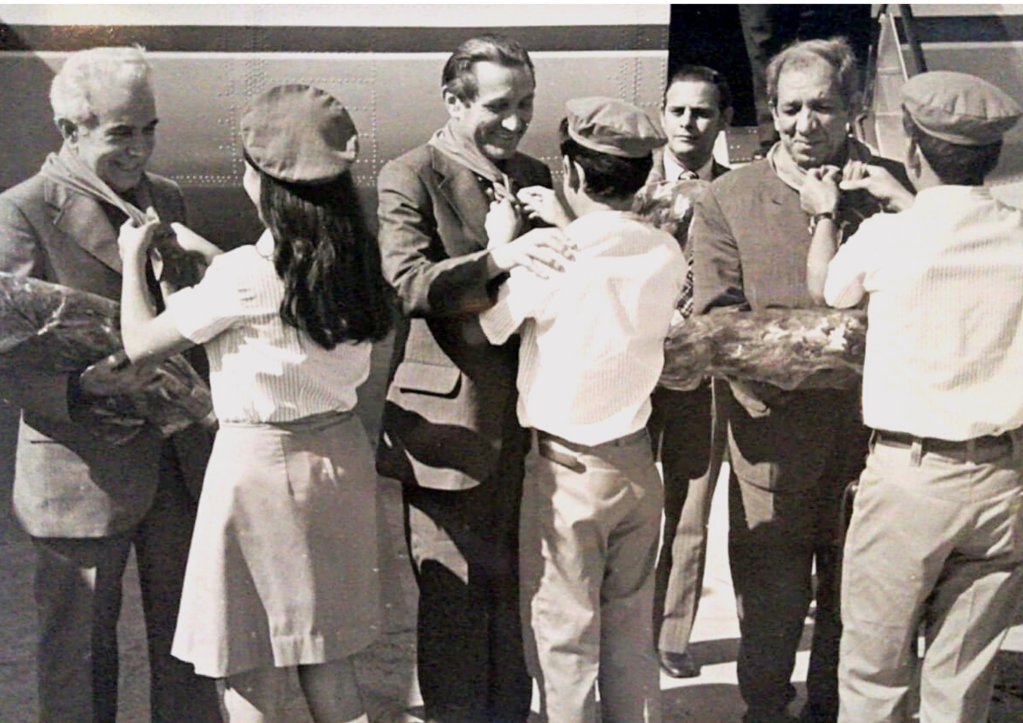
Antonio Maidana, Julio Rojas, and Alfredo Alcorta arriving in Cuba in 1978 after their release. They had been imprisoned for over two decades by the Stroessner regime following the Paraguayan general strike of 1958.

The 1958 Paraguayan general strike was a general strike organized in Paraguay in August 1958, marking the first national general strike in the country. The strike was called by the Confederación Paraguaya de Trabajadores (CPT; 'Paraguayan Workers' Confederation'), with demand such as a 30% raise in salaries, a general declaration of amnesty, a lifting of the state of emergency, a more equitable economic policy, securing the freedom to participate in political and trade union activities and the holding of a constituent assembly.

The strike was organized in the backdrop of an internal power struggle within the Colorado Party, between the civilian wing led by Epifanio Méndez Fleitas and the Colorado elements in the armed forces led by General Alfredo Stroessner. The CPT leadership was closely connected to the Méndez Fleitas faction.

Pro-strike committees were formed in preparation for the strike, one 96-member committee was organized by the CPT and others were set up by the CPT affiliate unions. Acción Católica also voiced support for the strike. Around 10,000 workers gathered on August 26, 1958, for a meeting at the CPT central office in Asunción were a four-member strike committee was elected.

The strike call had caught the Alfredo Stroessner government by surprise. Initially it responded by offering the CPT a 15% salary raise, an offer that the four-member strike committee rejected. By mid-night August 26–27, 1958 the general strike was called. The response on behalf of the state was swift. A workers' rally was dispersed by police. The CPT headquarters were surrounded by army and police forces. Over 200 trade union leaders, mainly from CPT, were arrested during the protests. Even the CPT general secretary was arrested (who, as a member of parliament, enjoyed parliamentary immunity). Offices of trade unions were closed down. Communist leaders such as Antonio Maidana, Julio Rojas and Alfredo Alcorta were captured and would remain jailed for two decades.

Following the strike, the Paraguayan labour movement found itself in shatters and without a functioning leadership. The government seized control over CPT. Exiled trade unionists in Argentina reorganized a 'CPT-Exile' (CPT-E) in response. Partially as a consequence of the crackdown on the strike and the closure of legal means to voice protest, many labour movement activists came to consider that armed struggle was the sole measure of organizing resistance to Stroessner.
