= Paraguayan Workers Confederation =

CPT
- Confederación Paraguaya de Trabajadores
- Founded: 1951
- Headquarters: Asunción, Paraguay
- Location: Paraguay
- Members: 43,000
- Key people: Gerónimo López, president Julis Etcheverry Espinola, secretary general
- Affiliations: ITUC

The Paraguayan Workers Confederation (Spanish: Confederación Paraguaya de Trabajadores) or CPT is a national trade union center in Paraguay. It was formed in 1951 with close ties to the Colorado Party. In 1958, after a general strike, many unionists were exiled, and formed the CPT-E, a CPT in exile.

CPT again operates in Paraguay. Until 1974 it was affiliated with the International Trade Union Confederation, but is now a member of the International Trade Union Confederation.
