= Project Adam =

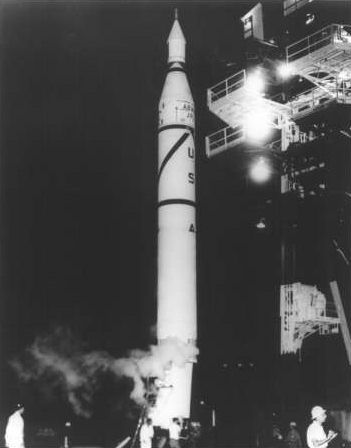
A Jupiter-C, the proposed launch vehicle for Project Adam

Project Adam was a proposed plan by the United States Army for a manned, suborbital rocket flight. It was developed in 1958, in parallel with the United States Air Force's Project Manhigh, and was initially called Project Man Very High. The twin aims were to gather scientific data on high-altitude flight and to enhance national prestige in the wake of the successful launch of the Soviet Union's Sputnik 1. A further goal was to investigate the possibility of troop transport by ballistic missile.

== History ==
The plan involved using off-the-shelf hardware to send a passenger on a steep ballistic flight from Cape Canaveral, with a splashdown in the North Atlantic. The launch vehicle would have been a modified Redstone Jupiter-C. The astronaut would have been housed in a capsule modelled on the USAF's Manhigh gondola, modified for a water landing, with no provision for manual control. At the apogee of flight the astronaut would have experienced six minutes of weightlessness. The first manned flight would have been preceded by a series of flights involving primates.

Project Adam was devised by the Army Ballistic Missile Agency, and was proposed to the Advanced Research Projects Agency on 11 July 1958. However although Secretary to the Army Wilber M. Brucker backed the project, largely as a psychological demonstration, Deputy Secretary of Defense Donald A. Quarles believed that it had "about the same technical value as the circus stunt of shooting a young lady from a cannon". The plan was not formally approved, although after the formation of NASA on 29 July 1958 elements of the hardware were folded into Project Mercury.
