= July 1958 =

Month of 1958

| << | July 1958 | | | | | >> |
| Su | Mo | Tu | We | Th | Fr | Sa |
| | | 1 | 2 | 3 | 4 | 5 |
| 6 | 7 | 8 | 9 | 10 | 11 | 12 |
| 13 | 14 | 15 | 16 | 17 | 18 | 19 |
| 20 | 21 | 22 | 23 | 24 | 25 | 26 |
| 27 | 28 | 29 | 30 | 31 |

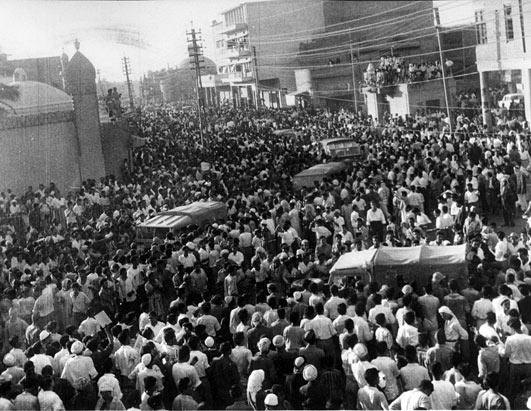
July 14, 1958: Iraqi Army leads revolution, kills the royal family and proclaims republic

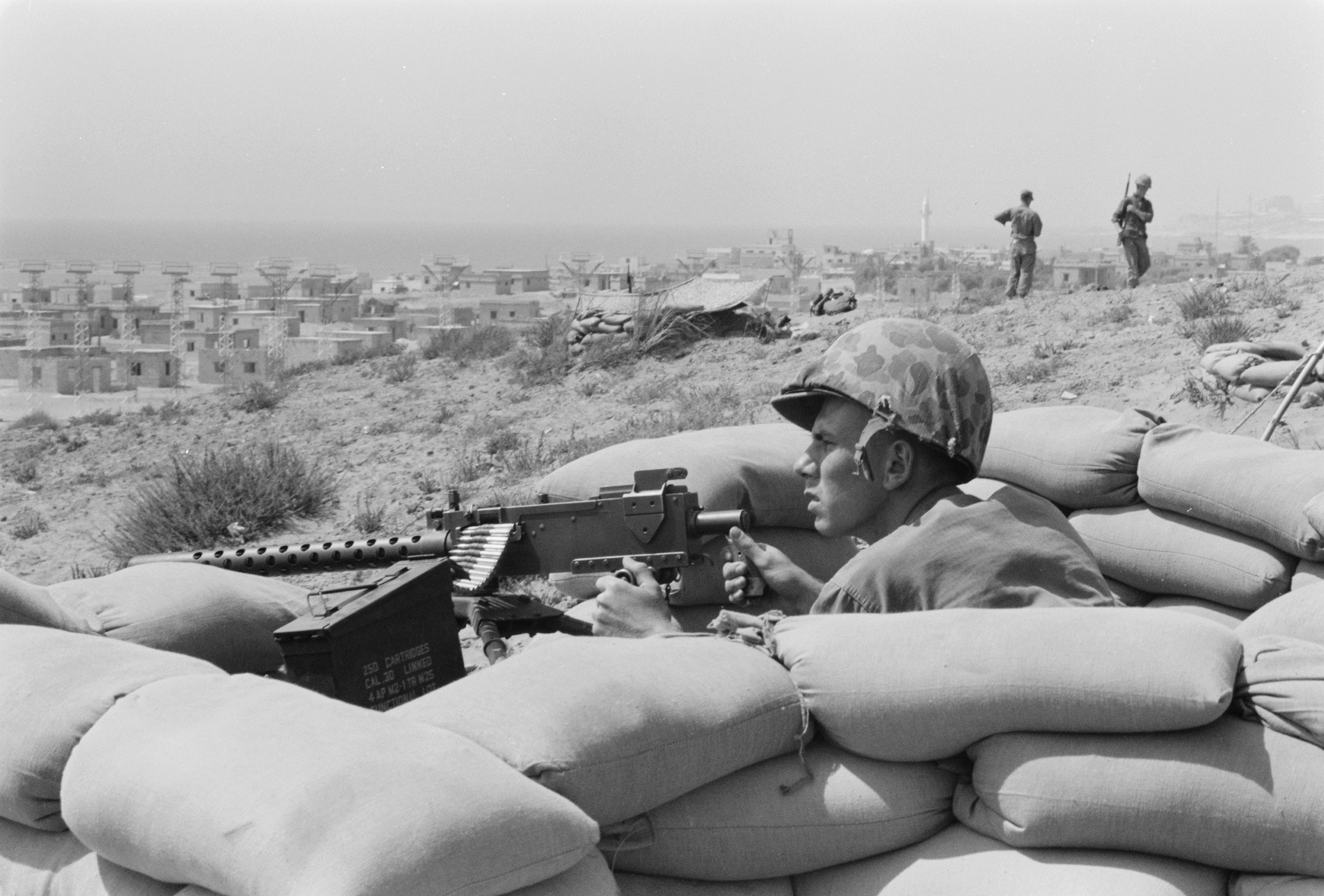
July 15, 1958: U.S. Marines invade Lebanon to protect regime from revolution

The following events occurred in July 1958:

== July 1, 1958 (Tuesday) ==
- The destruction began of the "Lost Villages", ten communities in the Canadian province of Ontario that had been evacuated to make way for the Saint Lawrence Seaway between the Atlantic Ocean and the Great Lakes in North America. At 8:00 in the morning, a cofferdam was demolished and within four days, the waters of the Atlantic had submerged the villages of Aultsville, Dickinson's Landing, Farran's Point, Maple Grove, Mille Roches, Moulinette, Santa Cruz, Sheek's Island, Wales, and Woodlands.
- Amintore Fanfani was sworn into office as Prime Minister of Italy along with a cabinet of ministers.
- Using the Trans Canada Microwave relay of 139 towers, the Canadian Broadcasting Corporation television network (CBC-TV) inaugurated telecasting from coast to coast for the first time since the network had gone on the air on September 6, 1952 in Montreal. The first 90-minute program, "Memo to Champlain", began on Canada's Dominion Day at 4:30 pm Eastern Daylight Time (2030 UTC), 1:30 pm Pacific and 6:00 pm in Newfoundland.
- The first conference among scientists from the world's nuclear powers to address nuclear weapons testing began in Geneva as delegates from the United States, the United Kingdom, the Soviet Union, and other nations working on a nuclear bomb, arrived in Switzerland. The meeting took place in the former conference room of the old League of Nations building.
- The capitol complex of federal government buildings of the new city of Brasília, scheduled to be the capital city of Brazil beginning in 1960, were dedicated in a ceremony by President Juscelino Kubitschek. capitol (disambiguation)
- The Soviet Union's "new order for Soviet agriculture" went into effect, implementing Nikita Khrushchev's reforms to provide a more equitable compensation for their production in collective farming.
- The scientific journal Physical Review Letters published its first issue.
- Born: Louise Penny, Canadian author who wrote the Chief Inspector Armand Gamache mystery novel series; in Toronto

== July 2, 1958 (Wednesday) ==
- The world's largest hotel at the time, the 1,065-room Stardust Resort and Casino, opened in the United States in Las Vegas. It would close in 2006 after 48 years of operation.
- The Phoenix of Hiroshima, a yacht commissioned by anti-nuclear protester Earle L. Reynolds, his wife and two children, and several Japanese crew, was intercepted by the U.S. Coast Guard ship USCGC Planetree after having sailed 65 miles (105 km) into Enewetak nuclear test zone in use by the U.S. for its ongoing Operation Hardtack I series of nuclear explosions. Mr. Reynolds was arrested and taken to Honolulu, where he was convicted of trespassing, a finding later overturned on appeal.
- Nineteen people in Audubon County, Iowa, were killed in a flood of the Nishnabotna River, with the towns of Exira and Hamlin being the hardest hit.
- Elvis Presley's first film since joining the U.S. Army, King Creole, was released in the U.S.
- Born:
  - Pavan Malhotra, Indian film and TV actor; in Delhi
  - Mylswamy Annadurai, Indian aerospace engineer who directed the satellite program of the Indian Space Research Organisation (ISRO); in Kothavadi, Madras State (now Tamil Nadu)
  - Colonel General Anatoly Sidorov, Russian Army officer and Chief of Staff of the six-nation Collective Security Treaty Organization; in Siva, Russian SFSR, Soviet Union
- Died: Martha Boswell, 53, American jazz singer and pianist who was the oldest of the Boswell Sisters trio.

== July 3, 1958 (Thursday) ==
- The Agreement for Cooperation on the uses of Atomic Energy for Mutual Defense Purposes, a mutual defense agreement between the United States and the United Kingdom, was signed in Washington, D.C., with the U.S. assisting the UK financially in developing a ballistic missile program. U.S. Secretary of State John Foster Dulles and British Embassy official Samuel Hood signed on behalf of their respective nations.
- Martin Sommer, a former German S.S. sergeant and guard at the Buchenwald concentration camp, was sentenced to life imprisonment after being convicted of murdering at least 25 inmates at Buchenwald. Sommer, who later lost an arm and a leg in battle and used a wheelchair, was given the maximum penalty allowed under West German law. After 13 years in prison, he would be transferred to a hospital and then to a nursing home, where he would be confined until his death in 1988.
- Born:
  - Zbigniew Adam Strzałkowski, Polish Franciscan Catholic missionary to Peru and one of the Three Martyrs of Chimbote murdered by the terrorist group Shining Path in 1991; in Tarnów (d. 1991)
  - Didier Mouron, Swiss-born Canadian artist specializing in elaborate pencil-sketched artwork; in Vevey
- Died: Viscount Bledisloe, 90, British foreign administrator and Governor-General of New Zealand from 1930 to 1935.

== July 4, 1958 (Friday) ==
- The St Ninian's Isle Treasure was found in Scotland by a local schoolboy, Douglas Coutts, who was assisting archaeologists in excavating a medieval chapel. The treasure had been buried under a slab more than 11 centuries earlier, between 750 and 825 AD.
- The first television transmission from an aircraft was made in Los Angeles from a helicopter, the KTLA "Telecopter", by the camera's inventor (and KTLA chief engineer), John D. Silva, and broadcast on the KTLA Channel 5 News.
- The German-Swiss thriller film Es geschah am hellichten Tag ("It Happened in Broad Daylight") premiered in West Berlin before going into general release on July 9 in West Germany and on July 12 in Switzerland. Seven remakes of the film, originally written by Friedrich Dürrenmatt, have been made in Italy, Hungary, the Netherlands, the U.S. and India.
- Chit Khae Tar A Mhan Par Pae, the first color film in Burma (now Myanmar) was premiered in Rangoon (now Yangon), although black-and-white films would continue to be the standard until the early 1990s.
- In India, the popular Tamil language film Annaiyin Aanai was released.
- Born: Kirk Pengilly, Australian musician who co-founded the rock band INXS; in Melbourne
- Died: Fernando de Fuentes, 63, Mexican film director

== July 5, 1958 (Saturday) ==
- Gasherbrum I, at 26,510 feet (8,080 m) the 11th highest mountain in the world, was first ascended. Nicholas Clinch led the American team that scaled the mountain via the Roch ridge.
- The Delaware Nation (Èhëliwsikakw Lënapeyok) in the U.S. state of Oklahoma, descendants of the Lenape tribe that had been forced westward from the colonies of Pennsylvania and New Jersey, received federal recognition as the "Delaware Tribe of Western Oklahoma", and would take on its current name as a self-governing unit in 1999.
- Born:
  - Chris Cline, U.S. coal mining magnate and billionaire; in Isaban, West Virginia (d. in helicopter crash, 2019)
  - Luz María Jerez, Mexican film actress, in San Miguel de Allende, Guanajuato state
  - Bill Watterson, American cartoonist who created the popular Calvin and Hobbes comic strip; in Washington, D.C.
- Died:
  - Rachel Crothers, 79, American playwright
  - Vikentije II, 67, Patriarch of the Serbian Orthodox Church

== July 6, 1958 (Sunday) ==
- In the first election in Mexico in which all women were allowed to vote, Adolfo López Mateos was elected President of Mexico, receiving more than 90 percent of the vote as candidate for the Partido Revolucionario Institucional (PRI), which also won 153 of the 162 seats in the Chamber of Deputies. His lone challenger was Luis H. Álvarez of the Partido Acción Nacional (PAN), which won only six seats in the Chamber.
- The Exhibition of Advanced Achievements of the National Economy of the USSR opened in Kyiv as the first event of a permanent campus of the Expocenter of Ukraine.
- Born:
  - Jennifer Saunders, English comedian and actress; in Sleaford, Lincolnshire
  - Antonio Álvarez Desanti, Costa Rican politician and president of the Central American nation's National Assembly 1995-1996 and in 2016; in San José

== July 7, 1958 (Monday) ==
- United States President Dwight D. Eisenhower signed the Alaska Statehood Act into law.
- The Automobile Information Disclosure Act of 1958 was signed into law by President Eisenhower, to take effect on January 1, 1959. It required that the dealers of all new automobiles were required to post a sticker on the window showing the manufacturer's suggested retail price, standard equipment and warranty details, prices of all optional equipment and pricing and highway mileage ratings.
- Born: Munnu Kasliwal, Indian businessman and jewelry designer; in Jaipur, Rajasthan (d. 2012)

== July 8, 1958 (Tuesday) ==
- The Recording Industry Association of America (RIAA) certified a record album as gold for the first time, after one million copies of the soundtrack of the film musical Oklahoma! had been sold.
- Born:
  - Kevin Bacon, American film actor; in Philadelphia
  - Jackson Anthony (stage name for Conanige Malsi Jackson Anthony), Sri Lankan film and TV actor; in Podiwee Kumbura
  - Neetu Singh (stage name for Harneet Kaur), Indian film actress; in New Delhi
  - Tzipi Livni, Israeli politician; in Tel Aviv
- Died:
  - Dr. Iosif Capotă, 46, Romanian anti-communist rebel, was executed by firing squad at Gherla Prison seven months after his arrest by the Securitate, Romania's secret police.
  - Yousef VII Ghanima, 77, Patriarch of the Chaldean Catholic Church since 1947

== July 9, 1958 (Wednesday) ==
- General Electric Company personnel presented a briefing at NACA headquarters on studies related to human spaceflight. The company held contracts let by the Wright Air Development Center for study and mock-up of a crewed spacecraft. NACA made no official comment.
- A 7.8 magnitude earthquake in southeast Alaska caused a landslide that produced a megatsunami. The run-up from the waves reached 525 m (1,722 ft) on the rim of Lituya Bay.

== July 10, 1958 (Thursday) ==
- The first parking meters in Britain were installed, with 600 meters installed in the northern half of London's fashionable Mayfair area in the City of Westminster around Grosvenor Square. Parking for one hour required placement of a sixpence coin into the meter. Parking meters had been used in the U.S. since 1935.
- In a joint statement by U.S. President Eisenhower and Canadian Prime Minister Lester B. Pearson, the two North American leaders announced that they had agreed to create the "Canada-United States Committee on Joint Defense", consisting of the Canadian Secretary of State for External Affairs and the U.S. Secretary of State; the Canadian Minister of Defence and the U.S. Secretary of Defense; and the Canadian Minister of Finance and the U.S. Secretary of the Treasury."
- In Geneva, Western and Soviet bloc scientists reached their first agreement, that any inspections to police a moratorium on nuclear weapons testing should be done by allowing each side to place acoustic detection devices in the other's territory.
- Born:
  - Fiona Shaw, Irish film and TV actress; in Cobh
  - Béla Fleck, American banjo player; in New York City

== July 11, 1958 (Friday) ==
- Count Michael Rhédey von Kis-Rhéde, direct descendant of Samuel Aba, King of Hungary, age 60, was murdered at his residence in Olcsvar (now in Slovakia) in the course of the seizure of a few hectares of land by the Communist government of Czechoslovakia in the course of its collectivization process.
- Born:
  - Hugo Sánchez, Mexican football manager and former footballer; in Mexico City
  - Mark Lester, English child actor and osteopath; in Oxford
  - Kirk Whalum, American jazz and R&B musician; in Memphis

== July 12, 1958 (Saturday) ==
- The Royal Malaysian Navy received independent ownership of its own fleet as Britain transferred ownership of Royal Navy vessels that had been on loan. The ships that became RMN vessels were the minesweeper HMS Sri Johore landing ships HMS Pelandok and HMS Sri Perlis, and eight patrol boats (Panglima, Sri Kedah, Sri Selangor, Sri Perak, Sri Pahang, Sri Kelantan and Sri Trengganu).
- The Quarrymen, a group of Liverpool musicians (John Lennon, Paul McCartney, George Harrison, with drummer Colin Hanton and keyboardist John Lowe), paid 17 shillings and 6 pence to make their first professional recording, a 78 rpm disc of their performance of "In Spite of All the Danger" (an original song by McCartney and Harrison) and a cover version of Buddy Holly's "That'll Be the Day". Lennon, McCartney and Harrison (without Hanton and Lowe) would later rename the group "The Beatles".
- Henri Cornelis became Governor-General of the Belgian Congo, the last Belgian governor prior to independence as what is now the Democratic Republic of the Congo.
- Born: Tonya Williams, English-born Canadian and U.S. television actress known for The Young and the Restless; in London

== July 13, 1958 (Sunday) ==
- In Malaysia, Abdul Halim ibni Almarhum became the new Sultan of Kedah upon the death of his father, Sultan Badlishah. Abdul Halim would rule Kedah, one of the constituent sultanates of Malaysia, for 59 years before his death in 2017, and would twice serve as Malaysia's head of state, the Yang di-Pertuan Agong, from 1970 to 1975 and again from 2011 to 2016.
- Born: Roger L. Jackson, American voice actor; in Atlanta

== July 14, 1958 (Monday) ==
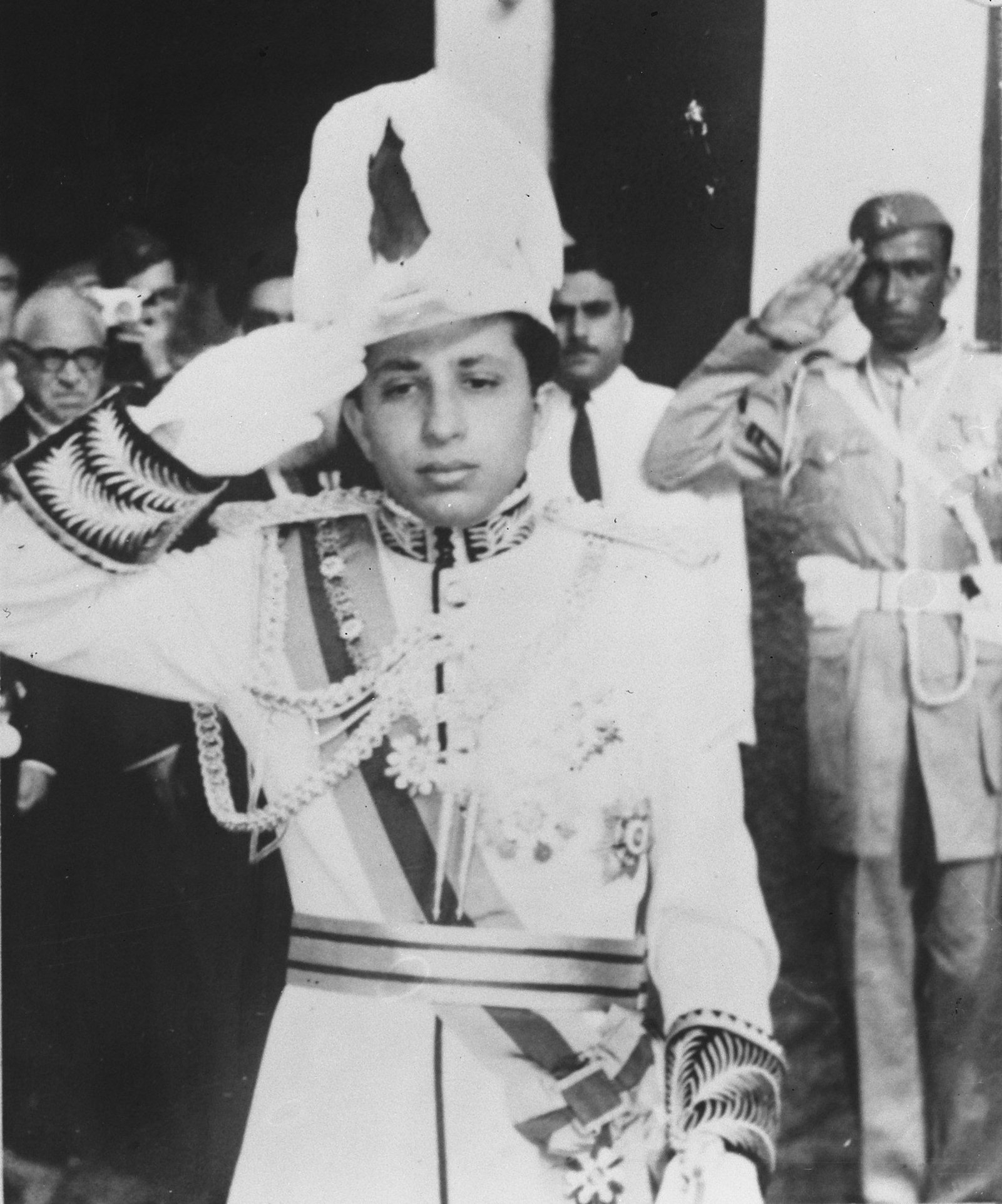
King Faisal II

- King Faisal II of Iraq was killed in a coup d'état, led by Brigadier General Abd al-Karim Qasim, who abolished the monarchy and declared Iraq to be a republic. Colonel Abdul Salam Arif, who led troops of the 19th and 20th Brigades of the Iraqi Army's 3rd Division, ordered a regiment to invade al-Rahab, the royal palace in Baghdad. By order of Crown Prince 'Abd al-Ilah, the palace guard offered no resistance. Once in, Captain Abdus Sattar As Sab ordered the family rounded up, ordered them to face the wall, and shot them to death, including the Crown Prince, his mother Princess Nafeesa and sister Princess Abadiya, other members of the royal family and several servants, as well as the King and Jordan's Prime Minister Ibrahim Hashem, who was a guest at the palace.
- The first Japanese anime and first color television show, Mogura no Abanchūru ("Mole's Adventure"), was telecast on Nippon TV (NTV).
- The Queen's Baton Relay was introduced as a tradition in advance of the quadrennial British Empire and Commonwealth Games, held in Wales for the first time in the city of Cardiff. A runner started from the forecourt of Buckingham Palace in London after being handed the baton by Queen Elizabeth II, and successive runners carried the baton through multiple English counties and all 13 Welsh counties before the baton was handed back to the Queen at the July 14 opening ceremony for the Games. The relay was repeated every four years afterward, with the 1962 relay starting in London and ending at Perth in Australia.
- Born: Luan Jujie, Chinese-born fencer and Olympic gold medalist who later competed for Canada; in Nanjing

== July 15, 1958 (Tuesday) ==
- After having escaped a rebel attack on his home the day before, but unable to get out of Baghdad, Iraq's Prime Minister Nuri al-Said was captured while trying to get past a patrol while disguised as a woman.
- In the first intervention of U.S. combat troops in the Middle East, Lebanon was invaded by the first of 5,000 United States Marines who landed in Beirut to preserve order and to support the pro-Western government. Operation Blue Bat was the first application of the "Eisenhower Doctrine" to use the U.S. military to protect any regime considered to be threatened by Communism.
- Cook Electric Company submitted a proposal to the McDonnell Aircraft Corporation as a part of a preliminary study and design effort by McDonnell for a "manned satellite", a spacecraft that could safely carry at least one human being into space. McDonnell, prior to being awarded the Mercury prime development contract in February 1959, spent 11 months under a company research budget working on a crewed orbital spacecraft concept.
- Born:
  - Bergen (stage name for Belgin Sarılmışer), Turkish singer; in Mersin (d. 1989)
  - Christian Dornier, French mass murderer who killed 14 people in 1989; in Baume-les-Dames, Doubs département
  - Jörg Kachelmann, West German-born Swiss TV meteorologist and entrepreneur who founded the Meteomedia AG weather service; in Lörrach, Baden-Württemberg
  - General Lone Træholt, Danish Air Force officer and the first woman in armed forces of Denmark to reach the rank of general; in Løkken
- Died:
  - Eugene Burns, 52, American journalist and war correspondent for the Associated Press, was killed by a mob while covering the Iraq revolution.
  - Ratan Devi, 68, (stage name for Alice Coomaraswamy) English musician who performed under the stage name Ratan Devi and popularized Indian music in Britain and the U.S., died of heart disease.
  - Anna Marion Hilliard, 56, Canadian obstetrician who co-developed the simplified Pap test to detect cancer of the cervix, died from lung cancer.
  - Julia Lennon, 44, English housewife and the mother of future Beatle John Lennon, was killed when she was struck by a car in Liverpool.

== July 16, 1958 (Wednesday) ==
- Ghana Airways, the national airline for Ghana, made its first flight, 11 days after being incorporated, departing Accra for London on a Boeing 377 Stratocruiser.
- The United States Congress passed the National Aeronautics and Space Act of 1958, creating NASA.
- Born: Michael Flatley, Irish-American tapdancer and theatrical performer known for Riverdance and other shows; in Chicago
- Died: Birger Eriksen, 82, Norwegian Army officer whose defense against the 1940 German invasion of Norway in the Battle of Drøbak Sound sank the lead ship of the initial invasion force and allowed the Norwegian government time to evacuate Oslo

== July 17, 1958 (Thursday) ==
- Two battalions of British paratroopers landed in Jordan to defend King Hussein's regime from the possibility of a spreading of the recent revolt in Iraq, while the United States sent more than 50 patrolling jets from carriers on the U.S. Navy's Sixth Fleet.
- The U.S. House of Representatives voted overwhelmingly, 241 to 155, to approve a bill that would have limited the U.S. Supreme Court from using federal laws to nullify laws passed by individual U.S. states.
- Born: Wong Kar-wai, Chinese-born Hong Kong film director; in Shanghai
- Died: Henri Farman, 84, British-French bicyclist, aviator and aircraft designer

== July 18, 1958 (Friday) ==
- In a memorandum to Dr. James R. Killian, Jr., Special Assistant to the President for Science and Technology, Dr. Hugh L. Dryden, Director of NACA, pointed out that NASA would inherit from NACA a rich technical background, competence, and leadership for putting human beings into space. NACA groups had researched stabilization of ultra-high speed vehicles, provision of suitable controls, high-temperature structural designs, and reentry problems, including the design of a satellite with a crew, and the X-15 program had provided experience for humans to apply to orbital flight.
- American stock car racing driver Richard Petty started his NASCAR career with a race in Canada at Toronto's Exhibition Stadium, the first of 1,184 races he would participate in over a 35-year career. The race, the Canadian National, was won by Richard's father, Lee Petty.
- Born: Margo Vliegenthart; Dutch politician; in Utrecht

== July 19, 1958 (Saturday) ==
- The first U.S. test of a three-engined intercontinental ballistic missile (ICBM) failed when a rate gyroscope failed on the new SM-65 Atlas rocket.
- The government of Amintore Fanfani narrowly received approval in Italy's Chamber of Deputies by a margin of only seven votes, 295 to 287 with nine deputies abstaining rather than voting no. On July 12, the Italian Senate had approved the Fanfani government, 128 to 111.
- In Yugoslavia, 23 people were killed and 10 critically injured in an explosion at the Kokin Brod hydroelectric power plant at Nova Varoš in SR Serbia.
- The Dockum Drug Store sit-in began in the U.S. in Wichita, Kansas to challenge the policy of the local Rexall Drugs' lunch counter, legal at the time, to allow only white customers to be served. Ten well-dressed black college students took up the seats of the counter and placed orders for soft drinks. The students continued to come daily for 23 days until the store owner, having lost revenue, gave up on August 11, 1958, and allowed persons of all races to be served equally. The Dockum chain, affected by the national publicity, issued an order desegregating lunch counters in all of its stores.
- Born:
  - Azumah Nelson, Ghanaian professional boxer and holder of the world featherweight and super-featherweight titles during the 1980s and 1990s; in Accra
  - Jonathan Lee (stage name for Li Zongsheng), Taiwanese musician and record producer who popularized Mandopop; in Beitou District of Taipei

== July 20, 1958 (Sunday) ==
- For the first time in almost nine years, Colombia convened its bicameral congress under a new "national front" agreement that evenly split the membership of the Chamber of Representatives, and the Colombian Senate, between the Liberal Party and the Conservative Party, a plan that applied to also provincial and municipal legislative bodies and cabinets.
- The Kingdom of Jordan announced that it was severing all diplomatic and economic relations with the United Arab Republic (UAR), which consisted of Egypt and Jordan's neighbor, Syria, after the UAR recognized the military regime that had overthrown the monarchy in Iraq six days earlier.
- U.S. Secretary of State Dulles and British Foreign Secretary Selwyn Lloyd reached an agreement for joint action for defense of Western economic interests in the Middle East, after four days of meetings in Washington DC.
- Born: Billy Mays, American television salesman; in McKees Rocks, Pennsylvania (d. 2009)
- Died: Franklin Pangborn, 69, American comedian and character actor in film

== July 21, 1958 (Monday) ==
- The Indonesian Army, having captured the Permesta rebel capital at Manado on June 24, was able to capture the city of Tondano, and then to use it as a base to prepare to take Tomohon.

== July 22, 1958 (Tuesday) ==
- Bikini Atoll, in the Marshall Islands in the South Pacific, was struck by a nuclear bomb for the 23rd and last time, bringing to an end U.S. nuclear testing that lasted from 1946 to 1958. The final blast was part of the Operation Hardtack I testing by the U.S. that had started on April 28.
- Born:
  - Tatsunori Hara, Japanese baseball player and manager for the Yomiuri Giants, Central League Rookie of the Year in 1981 and MVP in 1983; in Sagamihara
  - Vladimir Stepanov, Soviet-Russian armwrestler; in Kopeysk
  - David Von Erich (ring name for David A. Adkisson), American professional wrestler; in Dallas (d. 1984)

== July 23, 1958 (Wednesday) ==
- The Divorce (Insanity and Desertion) Act 1958 took effect upon being given Royal Assent, and modified the law in the United Kingdom for grounds for divorce, providing that a divorce could be had if the spouse had been receiving treatment for mental illness for at least five years.
- Born: Tomy Winata (Guo Shuo Feng), Indonesian multimillionaire businessman and philanthropist; in Jakarta

== July 24, 1958 (Thursday) ==
- Jack Kilby, an electrical engineer for the Texas Instruments Company, first recorded his inspiration for the integrated circuit, an idea that all the components for a transistor circuit could be fabricated from the same material, silicon. Kilby, alone in his laboratory while other TI employees were on vacation, wrote in his lab notebook, "The following circuit elements could be made on a single slice: resistors, capacitors, distributed capacitors, transistor," and made rough sketches of how each component could be made. He would give the first demonstration of the working model on September 12, 1958.
- Fourteen life peerages (which did not pass through inheritance and which could include women for the House of Lords), the first under the Life Peerages Act 1958, were created in the United Kingdom. The act had been given Royal assent on April 30. Prime Minister Harold Macmillan proposed the initial titles for 10 men and four women, with Ian Fraser of the BBC being the first to receive a life peerage, being named Baron Fraser of Lonsdale on August 1 by the Queen. Sociologist Barbara Wootton became the first woman to be made a life peer, becoming Baroness Wootton of Abinger on August 8.

== July 25, 1958 (Friday) ==
- The last Packard luxury automobile was manufactured. Production by the Studebaker-Packard Corporation ceased as the last vehicle rolled off of the assembly line in South Bend, Indiana.
- The Soviet Union removed its last occupation troops from Romania after negotiations by Romanian Communist leader Gheorghe Gheorghiu-Dej and Soviet Communist chief Nikita Khrushchev.
- The Miss Universe pageant in Long Beach, California, was won by Luz Marina Zuluaga, Miss Colombia.
- Born
  - Hanan Eshel, Israeli archaeologist; in Rehovot (d. 2010)
  - Thurston Moore, American musician who co-founded the rock band Sonic Youth; in Coral Gables
- Died: Harry Warner, 76, Polish-born American studio executive and co-founder, with his three brothers, of the Warner Bros. studio

== July 26, 1958 (Saturday) ==
- Queen Elizabeth II of the United Kingdom announced that she would be giving her son and heir apparent, 11-year-old Prince Charles, the customary title of Prince of Wales. The Queen made the announcement at the end of the 1958 British Empire and Commonwealth Games, held in Cardiff.
- The United States launched the Explorer 4 satellite into orbit. The Explorer satellite made the discovery that the Van Allen Radiation Belt varied in its intensity as it encountered an area 1,200 miles (1,900 km) above the Equator over South America, where the radiation was 10 roentgens in an hour, "167 times more intense than the mysterious rays thought to have been discovered by the earlier Explorer satellites" and "enough to inflict lethal damage on a space traveler in a fairly short time."
- Born: Jesús Barrero, Mexican voice-over actor on dubbed versions of U.S. films, and for television animation; in Mexico City (died of lung cancer, 2016)
- Died: U.S. Air Force Captain Iven Carl Kincheloe Jr., 30, American test pilot who had been selected as an astronaut, was killed after ejecting from a malfunctioning F-104 fighter. Kincheloe's parachute deployed but failed to slow his descent to a safe rate.

== July 27, 1958 (Sunday) ==
- USMC Private First Class Walter Richardson, from Brooklyn, became the first U.S. serviceman to be killed during the Lebanon intervention. While at first it appeared he had been killed by a sniper near the Beirut airport, it developed that Richardson was shot accidentally by a stray bullet from another Marine's .45 pistol while climbing over a wall in Beirut.
- Two American balloonists became the first persons to spend more than 24 hours in Earth's stratosphere, staying inside an enclosed aluminum gondola for 34 1/2 hours after having taken off the day before from an open area near Crosby, Minnesota. The two men, U.S. Navy Commander Malcolm Ross and M. Lee Lewis, reached an altitude of 82,000 feet (25,000 m) the day before and then came down in a pasture on a farm near Woodworth, North Dakota. Their gondola bounced along the ground for 1 mile (1.6 km) before coming to a halt.
- Born:
  - Christopher Dean, British ice dancer and 1984 Olympic gold medalist; in Calverton, Nottinghamshire
  - Kimmo Hakola, Finnish composer; in Jyväskylä
  - Margarethe Schreinemakers, German news presenter and television talk show host known for Schreinemakers live; in Krefeld, Nordrhein-Westfalen, West Germany
- Died: U.S. Army Air Forces Major General Claire Lee Chennault, 67, organizer of the "Flying Tigers", a volunteer force of U.S. pilots assisting the Chinese Air Force in defense against Japan, died of lung cancer.

== July 28, 1958 (Monday) ==
- U.S. track and field athlete Rafer Johnson broke the world's record for the decathlon in the course of an event arranged in Moscow as the first-ever dual meet between the men's and women's track teams of the United States and the Soviet Union. The Soviets narrowly won the dual meet, 172 points to 170, based on the American men winning 126-109, and the Soviet women winning, 63-44. Johnson compiled 8,302 points in the ten decathlon events and surpassed the record of 8,013 set by the Soviet Union's Vasily Kuznetsov, who finished in second place.
- Ouezzin Coulibaly, the Prime Minister of French Upper Volta (now the Republic of Burkina Faso) as president of its governing council and the colony's representative in France's Assemblée Nationale and formerly the Sénat, took a leave of absence for health treatment in France, and named Maurice Yaméogo to govern in his place. Coulibaly died less than six weeks later and Yaméogo became the new head of the colony. Upon Upper Volta's independence in 1960, Yaméogo would become its first president.
- Frank Marugg, a violinist with the Denver Symphony Orchestra, was awarded U.S. patent #2,844,354 for the auto immobilizer, commonly called the "Denver boot", "tire boot" or "wheel clamp", designed at the request of the Denver law enforcement to be locked around the tire of a motor vehicle to prevent anyone from driving until the device was unlocked, for the purpose of compelling persons to pay outstanding traffic tickets.
- Born:
  - Deon van der Walt, South African operatic tenor; in Cape Town (murdered, 2005)
  - Terry Fox, Canadian distance runner who raised millions for cancer research during his attempted run across Canada in 1980; in Winnipeg, Manitoba (died of cancer, 1981)
- Died:
  - Dr. J. E. Walker, 79, African-American physician and businessman who founded the Universal Life Insurance Company and the Tri-State Bank & Trust Company to serve the black community, was shot to death by a former friend to whom he had loaned money.
  - Herb Narvo, 45, Australian rugby league star and one-time national heavyweight boxing champion, died of cancer

== July 29, 1958 (Tuesday) ==
- Lebanon's Prime Minister Sami es-Solh narrowly escaped an assassination attempt that killed six other people. Solh was being driven to Beirut from his summer home in Brummana, preparing to meet an emissary sent by U.S. president Eisenhower, and was approaching the village of Mekaleff and a seemingly abandoned car on the side of the road. As he drew alongside, explosives inside the car were detonated, killing a policeman escorting the car and five people who had been in a private automobile that had been passing in the opposite direction. Solh and the people in his limousine were uninjured.
- The Battle of Las Mercedes began as part of the Cuban Army's Operation Verano, as the troops of General Eulogio Cantillo surrounded the 300 guerrillas of Fidel Castro's 26th of July Movement. Rather than using the opportunity to annihilate the guerrillas and put an end to Castro's Cuban Revolution, General Castillo agreed three days later to Castro's request for a one-week ceasefire to negotiate a surrender, during which the trapped guerrillas escaped to safety. The Cuban Army's lost opportunity to capture Castro would be followed five months later by Castro's victory.
- Haiti's President Francois Duvalier personally led his palace guard to put down a rebellion and coup attempt led by former Haitian Army captains Alix Pasquet and Philippe Dominique, both of whom were killed in the counterattack.
- NASA, the National Aeronautics and Space Administration, came into existence upon the signing of the National Aeronautics and Space Act into law by U.S. President Eisenhower. The U.S. House of Representatives had approved the creation of NASA on June 2, followed by a slightly different bill approved by the U.S. Senate on June 16, and the compromise bill was passed by both houses of Congress on July 16.

== July 30, 1958 (Wednesday) ==
- An explosion of fireworks killed 11 employees of the Marutamaya Kokatsu Fireworks Company in Tokyo.
- In a mass baptism that a spokesman for the Jehovah's Witnesses described as "the largest such ceremony in the history of Christendom", a group of 7,136 men and women were immersed in the waters of Long Island Sound in New York after gathering at Orchard Beach in the Bronx borough of New York City. The spokesman stated that the group was of 4,199 men and 2,937 women who split into two groups, then were "fanned out into thirty lanes flanked by T-shirted volunteers who guided them to the baptizers, about seventy-five feet offshore in waist-deep water."
- Using the model of the Mercury contour couch designed by Maxime A. Faget and associates, volunteer Carter C. Collins withstood a 20g load on the "human centrifuge" at Johnsville, Pennsylvania. This test proved that humans could withstand the reentry accelerations of a returning satellite.
- Born: Kate Bush, English pop music singer; in Bexleyheath, Kent

== July 31, 1958 (Thursday) ==
- The leaders of the two most powerful Communist nations in the world met in Beijing as Soviet Premier Nikita Khrushchev, accompanied by Defense Minister Rodion Y. Malinovsky, Deputy Foreign Minister Vasily V. Kuznetsov and Central Committee member Boris N. Ponomarev, was the guest of Mao Zedong, Chairman of the Chinese Communist Party, for a secret four-day conference. The Soviet group returned to Moscow after Khrushchev and Mao signed a joint communique revealing that the two had met and demanding that the United States and the United Kingdom withdraw all troops from Lebanon and Jordan, respectively.
- Three technicians of Douglas Aircraft Company were killed, and three others severely burned, when a liquid oxygen valve failed on a PGM-17 Thor rocket during a static test stand in Sacramento, California.
- Fouad Chehab was elected to a six-year term as the new President of Lebanon in a 48 to 7 vote, with one abstention, by the Lebanese Parliament. The other candidate, Raymond Edde, pledged his support for Chehab to succeed President Camille Chamoun, whose term was scheduled to expire on September 23. Prime Minister Sami es-Solh, who had narrowly escaped assassination the day before, stayed away from the session along with 10 other deputies of the 66-member parliament.
- Republic Aviation representatives briefed the NACA on the company's man-in-space studies in 1958. Republic officials envisioned a four-stage solid launch vehicle system and a lifting reentry vehicle, the "sled". The vehicle would have a triangular shape with a 75-degree leading-edge sweep. Aerodynamic and reaction controls would be available to the pilot. For the launch vehicle, Republic proposed a Minuteman first stage, a Polaris first stage, a Minuteman upper stage, and a Jumbo rocket fourth stage.
- Born: Mark Cuban, American computer software entrepreneur and billionaire, owner of the NBA Dallas Mavericks; in Pittsburgh
