= List of ghost towns in Ontario =

The Canadian province of Ontario has a significant number of ghost towns. These are most numerous in the Central Ontario and Northern Ontario regions, although a smaller number of ghost towns can be found throughout the province.

== A ==
- Allisonville
- Altona
- Ashdown
- Auld Kirk Scotch Settlement
- Aultsville

== B ==
- Balaclava, Grey County
- Balaclava, Renfrew County (partial)
- Ball's Falls
- Ballycroy
- Balvenie
- Bedford Mills
- Benny
- Berens River
- Biscotasing (partial)
- Blairton
- Boston Mills
- Brent (partial)
- Brisson
- Brudenell (revived)
- Burchell Lake
- Burwash
- Byng Inlet (partial)

== C ==
- Caledonia Springs
- Candytown
- Cashmere
- Cheddar
- Cheltenham (partial)
- Chippaweska
- Cockburn Island
- Cook Station
- Cooper's Falls (partial)
- Corbyville (partial)
- Cordova Mines (partial)
- Craigmont (partial)
- Creighton Mine
- Crooks Hollow

== D ==
- Dalton Mills
- Dalton Station
- Dartmoor
- Dawn Mills (revived)
- Decker Hollow
- Depot Harbour
- Desaulniers
- Dickinson's Landing
- Donnybrook
- Duncrief

== E ==
- Edenvale
- Eldorado
- Elmbank

== F ==
- Falkenburg
- Farran's Point
- Fleetwood
- Fossmill
- Foxmead Station
- Foymount (partial)
- Franz
- French River

== G ==
- Garden Island
- Gargantua
- Gelert
- Glanmire
- Gold Rock
- Goudreau
- Grant
- Greenlaw Corners
- Guelph Junction

== H ==
- Happy Valley
- Herron's Mills (revived)
- High Falls
- Horaceville
- Horncastle

== I ==
- Indiana
- Irondale

== J ==
- Jackfish
- Jerome Mine
- Josephine

== K ==
- Kennaway
- Khartum
- Khiva
- Kiosk
- Kormak (partial)

== L ==
- Leeblain
- Lemieux
- Letterkenny
- Lieury
- Lochalsh
- Lost Channel

== M ==
- Mafeking
- Maguire
- Malcolm
- Maple Grove
- Marlbank (partial)
- Mayerville
- Maynooth Station
- McGaw
- Melancthon
- Metropolitan
- Michael's Bay
- Millbridge
- Millbridge Station
- Mille Roches
- Milnet
- Moiles Mills
- Monsell
- Moulinette
- Mount Healey
- Mount Horeb
- Mowat
- Murphy's Corners

== N ==
- Nakina
- Napier (partial)
- Nemegos
- Nephton
- Nestorville
- Newbridge
- Newfoundout
- Nicholson
- Nickleton
- Northwood

== O ==
- O'Donnell

== P ==
- Pakesley
- Parker (partial)
- Patterson
- Petworth
- Pickerel Landing
- Pickle Crow
- Point Anne
- Ponsonby
- Port Milford
- Port Talbot

== R ==
- Ragged Rapids
- Ramsey
- Redwater
- Reesor
- Rodgerville
- Rye

== S ==
- St. Joseph
- Santa Cruz
- Scotia Junction
- Seguin Falls
- Sellwood
- Sheek Island
- Silver Centre
- Silver Islet
- Sinclairville
- Sodom
- South Portage
- Spence
- Spidertown
- Spry
- Squires Beach
- Strathaven
- Sulphide (revived)
- Sunshine
- Swords

== T ==
- Tomiko
- Traverston
- Tyrconnell

== U ==
- Uffington
- Umfraville
- Uhthoff

== V ==
- Victoria Mines
- Vroomanton (revived)

== W ==
- Wales
- Wanstead
- Wesleyville
- Whitfield
- Wilbur
- Winisk
- Woodhill
- Woodlands
- Worthington (original town)
