= Long Sault Parkway =

Islands and scenic parkway in Ontario

- Long Sault Parkway highlighted in red

Route information
- Maintained by the St. Lawrence Parks Commission
- Length: 10.1 km (6.3 mi)
- Existed: November 1958–present

Major junctions
- West end: County Road 2 west – Ingleside
- East end: County Road 2 east – Long Sault

Location
- Country: Canada
- Province: Ontario

Highway system
- Parkways of the Great Lakes; Long Sault; Niagara; St. Clair; 1000 Islands; Roads in Ontario

The Long Sault Parkway is a group of eleven islands west of Cornwall in the Canadian province of Ontario, as well as the name of the 10.1-kilometre (6.3 mi) scenic parkway connecting them. The islands, which include two public beaches and three campgrounds, were created by the flooding of the Long Sault rapids during construction of the St. Lawrence Seaway. The parkway, the islands, and their amenities are maintained by the St. Lawrence Parks Commission.

The parkway is located between the towns of Ingleside and Long Sault in the municipality of South Stormont, and connects with County Road 2 (former Highway 2) at both ends. Ingleside and Long Sault were created concurrently with the parkway to rehouse the residents of farms and communities that now lie below the surface of the St. Lawrence River as the result of the construction of the Moses-Saunders Power Dam. Beginning on July 1, 1958, and proceeding for nearly a week, 58,000 acres (235 km^{2}) of land between Iroquois and Cornwall were flooded; forming an island chain from the hilltops of the inundated land. Several sites along the parkway pay homage to these lost villages.

== Route description ==
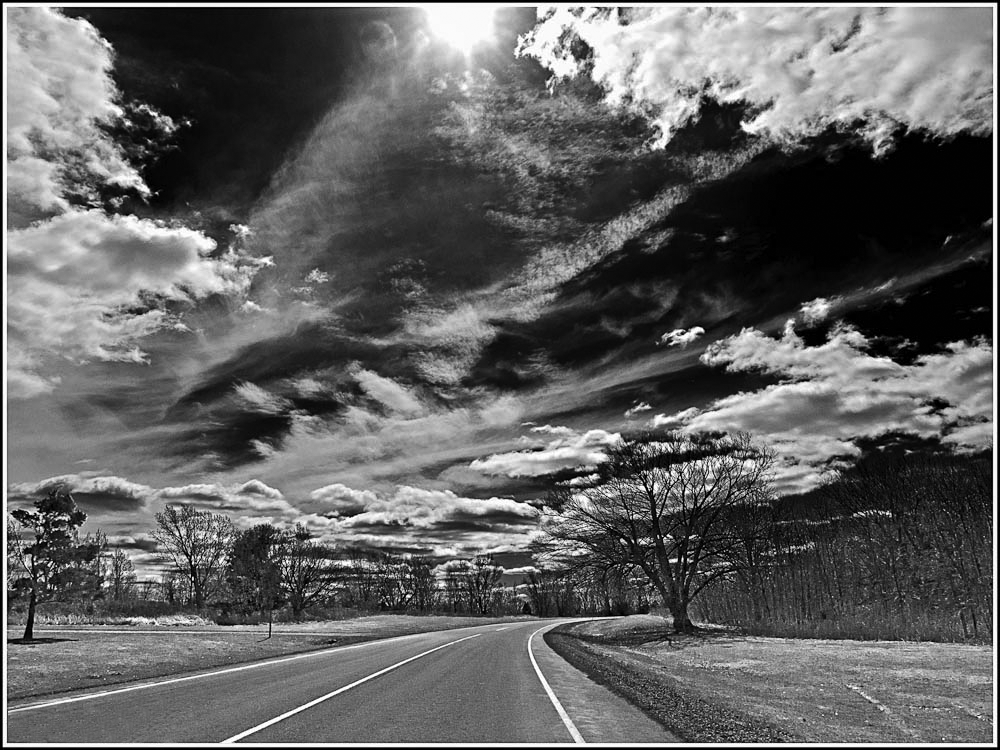
Long Sault Parkway on Macdonell Island

The Long Sault Parkway is a 10.1-kilometre (6.3 mi) route that interconnects eleven islands that lie in Lake St. Lawrence, the forebay of the Moses-Saunders Power Dam on the St. Lawrence River. These islands—the former hilltops of inundated farmland—comprise, from west to east, McLaren Island, Woodlands Island, Fraser Island, Hoople Island, Dickinson Island, Heriot Island, Vankoughnet Island, Phillpotts Island, Macdonnell Island, and Mille Roches Island, which itself connects to Snetsinger Island by footbridge. While the parkway, the islands, and their amenities are maintained by the St. Lawrence Parks Commission, Moulinette Island, which connects to Mille Roches Island by road, is not part of the Long Sault Parkway.

Beginning immediately east of Ingleside, the Long Sault Parkway branches south from Stormont, Dundas and Glengarry (SDG) County Road 2 and passes a parkway information booth, with the Ingleside Sewage Treatment Plant located on the southeast corner. A causeway and a short bridge cross over to McLaren Island, named after Rev. Narcisse McLaren, founder of the local Camp Kagama. The parkway curves east and provides access to the McLaren Campground before crossing a small swamp to Woodlands Island, which is named after the displaced community of Woodlands and is host to both a beach and a campground. Causeways carry the parkway east to Fraser Island, named after explorer Simon Fraser, and Hoople Island, named for one of the original settlers of the area. The latter contains a nature trail as well as a boat launch. Another causeway connects Hoople and Dickinson Islands.

Much of the Long Sault Parkway travels alongside the original route of Highway 2, which was flooded during the construction of the St. Lawrence Seaway.

Dickinson Island, named after the inundated village of Dickinson's Landing, is connected to Heriot Island, named for British army officer Frederick Heriot, by the only other bridge along the parkway aside from the two which connect the island chain to the mainland. The remaining islands are interconnected by causeways. Vankoughnet Island is named after Philip VanKoughnet, who was instrumental in the building of the Cornwall Canal. At Phillpotts Island, honouring canal engineer Lieutenant R.E. Phillpotts, the old alignment of Highway 2 surfaces above the St. Lawrence River. The parkway briefly follows the old highway alignment as it crosses to Macdonnell Island north of the submerged Lock 21. On Macdonnell Island, named for Bishop of Upper Canada Alexander Macdonell, the parkway gradually curves northward as it passes an information booth for The Lost Villages and Save Ontario Shipwrecks, as well as the Lock 21 and Camp Carp campsites.

The final island on the Long Sault Parkway itself is Mille Roches Island, named for the inundated village of Mille Roches. In addition to a beach and campground, two islands are connected to Mille Roches Island: Snetsigner Island, honouring local merchant and politician John Goodall Snetsinger, which is connected by footbridge; and Moulinette Island, in remembrance of the inundated village of Moulinette. The latter is connected to Mille Roches Island by road; it features private residences and is not part of the Long Sault Parkway. The parkway continues north, crossing a causeway and bridge to the mainland, where it passes a parkway information booth before ending at SDG County Road 2 at Long Sault; SDG County Road 35 (Moulinette Road) continues north into the town.

The Long Sault Parkway is considered one of the most scenic drives in Ontario. According to James Stoness of SunCruiser Travellers magazine, "[a]lthough only 11 kms long, the Long Sault Parkway excels in its scenic beauty of the St. Lawrence River." Northern Ontario Travel magazine included the parkway in their list of the Top 30 motorcycle roads in Ontario. In describing the parkway, The Globe and Mail noted, "Think Florida Keys on a smaller scale, but better." Ultimate Ontario remarked that it "isn't just one of the best drives in Ontario, it’s also one of the province's most unique places," while The Wedge described it as "an oasis unlike any other."

=== Islands ===
Listed from west to east:

- MacLaren Island
- Woodlands Island
- Fraser Island
- Hoople Island
- Dickinson Island
- Heriot Island
- Vankoughnet Island
- Phillpotts Island
- Macdonnell Island
- Snetsinger Island
- Mille Roches Island

== History ==
Animation showing the land changes resulting from the Moses-Saunders Power Dam

The Long Sault Parkway was created as a direct result of the building of the Moses-Saunders Power Dam and the St. Lawrence Seaway in the 1950s. The Seaway was a massive undertaking of both the Canadian and US governments that involved the "removal" of the Long Sault rapids by raising the water level approximately 26 metres (85 ft). Plans and small projects to tame the Long Sault, which straddled the border between the two countries, had been commonplace since the 1890s, with the International Joint Commission (IJC) being formed to deal with the bilateral process. However, continued stalling by the American Senate and Congress through the 1930s and 1940s resulted in Canada announcing in 1951 that it would proceed alone with the construction of a dam at Cornwall to harness power from the St. Lawrence River, as well as an expanded canal entirely within its borders. Shortly after, America ceased its opposition and joined the project, with approvals granted over the next several years by Congress. On June 7, 1954, the U.S. Supreme Court upheld the approvals, officially removing the final obstacle to construction. Ontario Hydro would lead the project, while the IJC would coordinate the cross-border work.

On August 10, 1954, prime minister Louis St. Laurent, Ontario premier Leslie Frost, New York governor Thomas E. Dewey and various officials gathered at the now inundated village of Maple Grove. There they set off a dynamite charge in place of the usual ceremonial sod-turning. Ontario Hydro set forth to relocate residents of the 58,000 acres (235 km^{2}) of land that would be flooded, and move some structures to one of two new town sites—Ingleside or Long Sault—or the Upper Canada Village. As well as displacing 6,500 people and submerging 10 communities, the project uprooted the Akwesasne First Nations and washed away the site of the Battle of Crysler's Farm; the former would not reach a settlement until 50 years later in 2008, while the latter saw a monument installed at Upper Canada Village. The Ontario-St. Lawrence Development Commission was formed in 1955 to develop the parkland and amenities along the future shoreline; all land west of Cornwall to Iroquois, below an elevation of 250 feet (80 m), was purchased.

Construction of the C$1.5 million Long Sault Parkway was announced on March 1, 1956, and began in June. McNamara Construction graded the future causeways while Davey Construction built the bridges. As a result of this dry construction, the three bridges carrying the parkway stood crossing empty fields as Ontario Hydro began to clear the 20,000 acres (81 km^{2}) of land that would be flooded in Ontario in 1957. On June 26, 1957, the Department of Mines released names for the future islands along the parkway, with each chosen to commemorate early settlers or communities lost to the project.

Inundation Day, when the flooding would begin, was set for July 1, 1958. At 8 am EDT, 30 tons of dynamite was detonated, knocking holes in the cofferdam holding back the St. Lawrence River at Long Sault. Water slowly but visibly crept up through the now-cleared farmlands and forests of the area for the next three days, ending July 4. However, the Long Sault Parkway and the amenities along it were not complete by that time. The road itself opened in November 1958, while various beaches and campgrounds opened by the following summer.

Engineering plan for parkway development from June 1956, showing the proposed Long Sault Parkway

== Major intersections ==
The following table lists locations along the Long Sault Parkway. The entire route is located in the township of South Stormont, within the United Counties of Stormont, Dundas and Glengarry.

Location	km	mi	Destinations	Notes
Ingleside	0.0	0.0	County Road 2 west – Brockville	
McLaren Island	1.0	0.62	McLaren Campground	
Woodlands Island	2.4	1.5	Woodlands Island Campground; Woodlands Beach	
Hoople Island	4.0	2.5	Hoople Island Campsites	Parking for Chipmunk Nature Trail and Butternut Nature Trail
Macdonnell Island	6.7	4.2	Lock 21 Campsites	
Mille Roches Island	8.2	5.1	Mille Roches Campground	Pedestrian access to Snetsinger Island
Mille Roches Island	8.9	5.5	Moulinette Island Causeway Street	
Long Sault	10.1	6.3	County Road 2 east – Cornwall	
1.000 mi = 1.609 km; 1.000 km = 0.621 mi

== See also ==
- The Lost Villages
