= Moses-Saunders Power Dam =

Dam in New York and Ontario

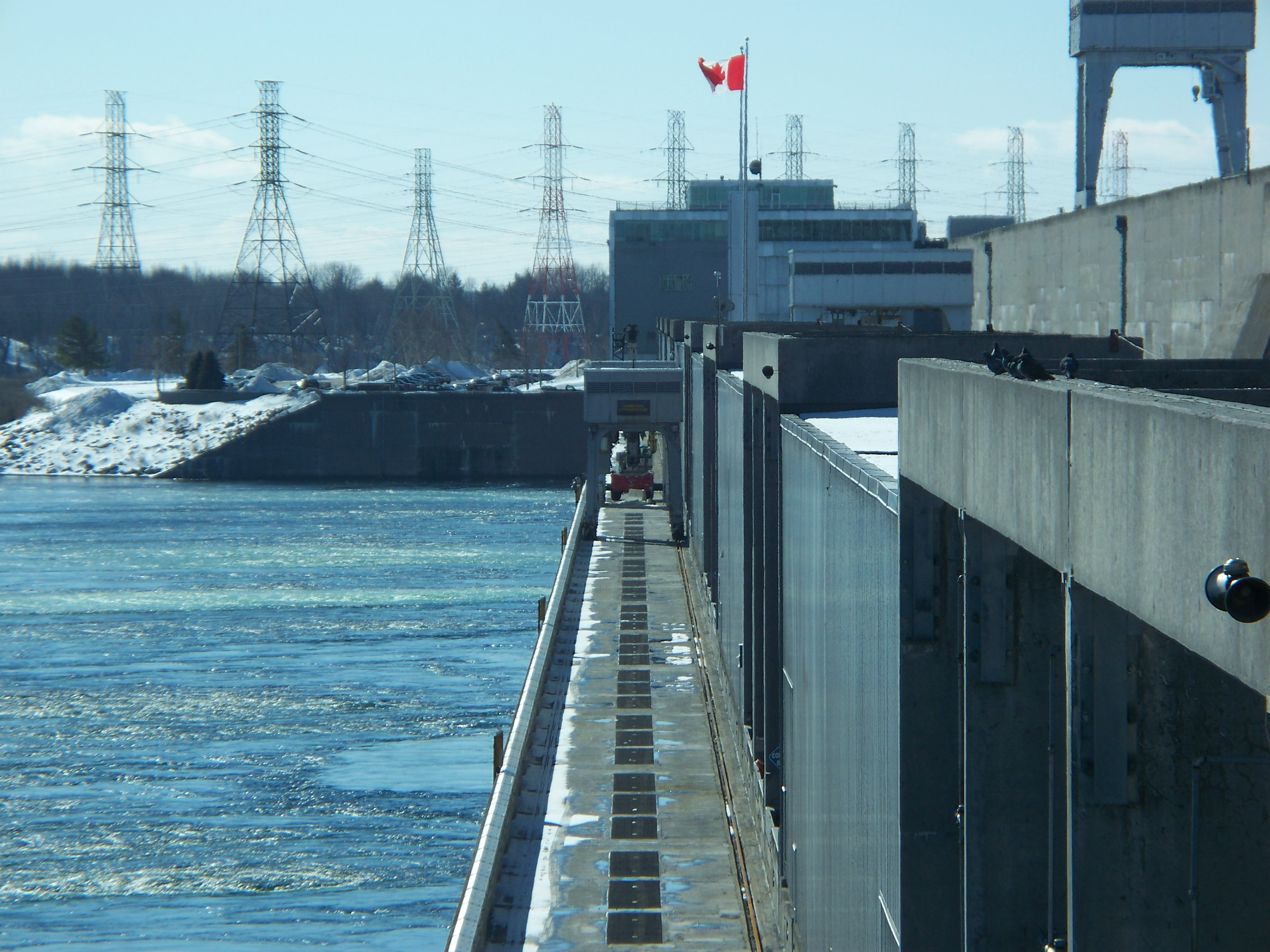
- The dam's R.H. Saunders Generating Station

- Location within New York
- Official name: Robert Moses-Robert H. Saunders Power Dam
- Country: United States/Canada
- Location: Massena, New York; Cornwall, Ontario
- Coordinates: 45°00′23″N 74°47′42″W
- Status: Operational
- Construction began: 1954
- Opening date: 1958
- Owners: New York Power Authority; Ontario Power Generation

Dam and spillways
- Impounds: Saint Lawrence River
- Height: 195.5 ft (60 m)
- Length: 3,216 ft (980 m)
- Spillways: Long Sault Dam

Reservoir
- Creates: Lake St. Lawrence
- Surface area: 100 mi^{2} (259 km^{2})
- Maximum length: 30 mi (48 km)

Power Station
- Commission date: R.H. Saunders: July 8, 1958-December 18, 1959
- Hydraulic head: 81 ft (25 m)
- Turbines: R.H. Saunders: 16 x 65.3 MW fixed-pitch Kaplan-type; St. Lawrence/FDR: 16 x 57 MW fixed pitch Kaplan-type
- Installed capacity: R.H. Saunders: 1,045 MW; St. Lawrence/FDR: 912 MW; Total: 1,957 MW

The Robert Moses-Robert H. Saunders Power Dam is a dam on the Saint Lawrence River straddling the border between the United States and Canada. It is located between Massena in New York and Cornwall in Ontario. The dam supplies water to two adjacent hydroelectric power generating stations, the United States' 912 MW St. Lawrence-Franklin D. Roosevelt Power Project, and Canada's 1,045 MW R.H. Saunders Generating Station. The dam is named for New York Power Authority chairman Robert Moses and Ontario Hydro chairman Robert Hood Saunders, who jointly oversaw its construction.

Constructed between 1954 and 1958 as part of the larger Saint Lawrence Seaway project, the dam created Lake St. Lawrence. Aside from providing significant amounts of renewable power, the dam regulates the St. Lawrence River and affords passage for the navigation of large vessels. Despite the enormous economic advantages of the dam, it required the relocation of 6,500 people and caused harm to the surrounding environment. Efforts have been made over the years to improve shoreline and fish habitats.

== Background ==
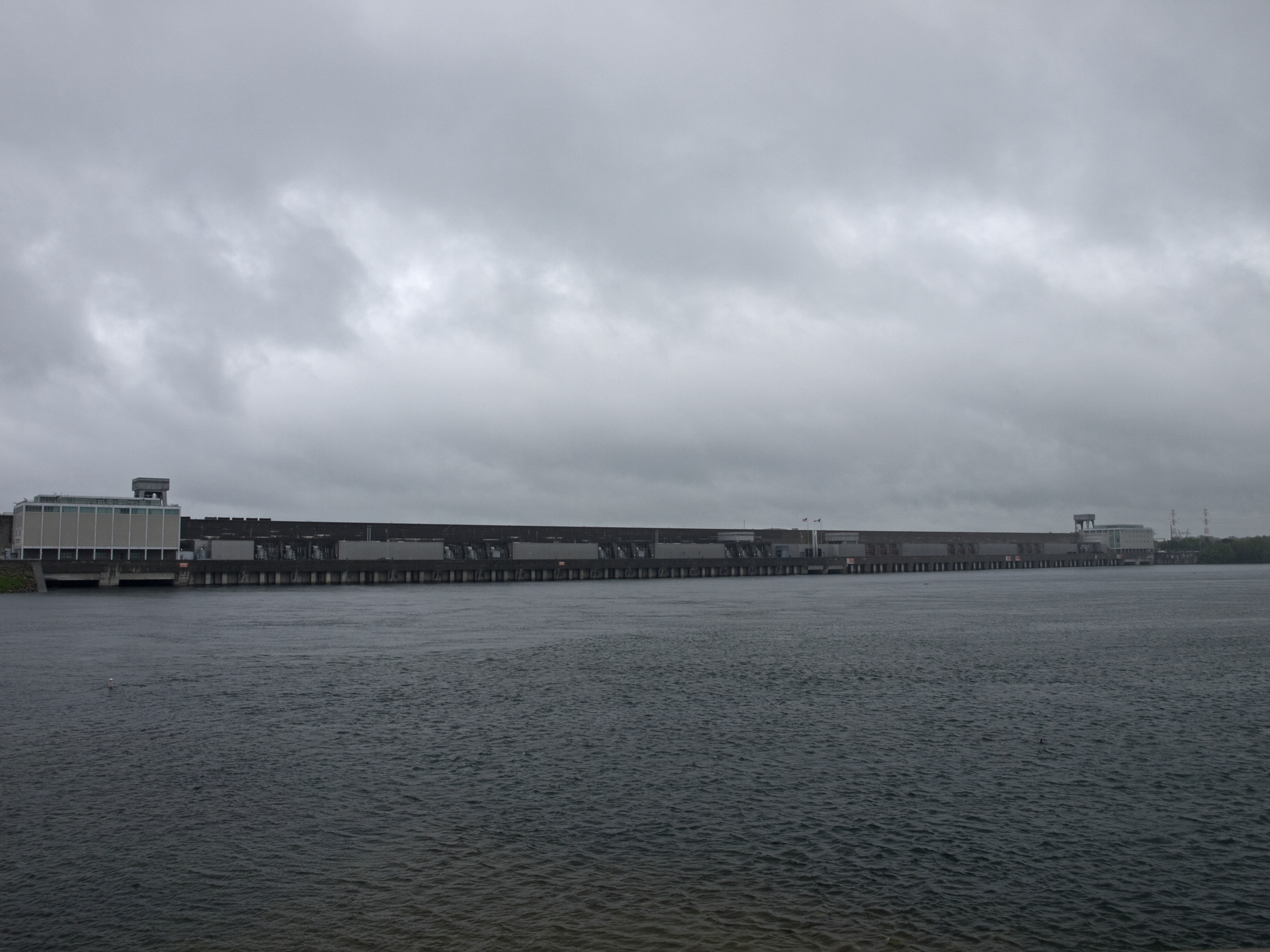
Panorama of the dam from the U.S. side

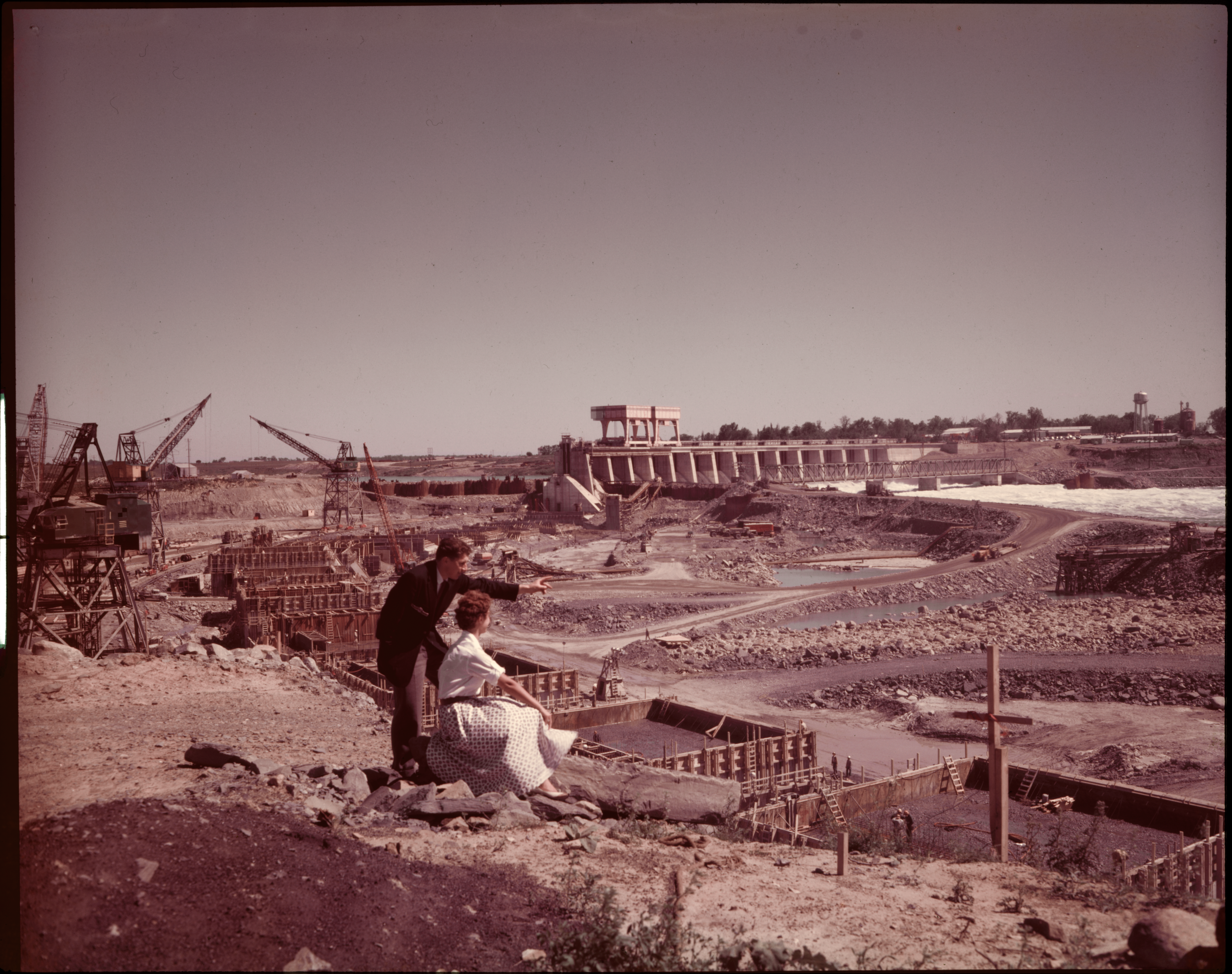
Long Sault dam under construction, Saint Lawrence Seaway, 1957

Development of the St. Lawrence River which serves as a border between Canada and the United States was in its early stages in 1871 when the Treaty of Washington was signed, which in part demarcated the St. Lawrence River as a boundary and offered Americans greater use of the Canadian side of the river for shipping. In 1895 the Deep Waterways Commission was established to explore expanded use of the river for navigation. International shipping on the river enabled trade between the two countries. The early St. Lawrence Seaway was proposed but railway companies in the United States stopped its construction because they felt it would reduce their profits. The Boundary Waters Treaty of 1909 further solidified cooperation between the U.S. and Canada on the river, allowing "free and open" navigation and establishing the International Joint Commission (IJC) to resolve disputes. In 1931, New York's Governor Franklin D. Roosevelt signed the Power Authority Act which allowed the development of the St. Lawrence River for power use. A primary site was just below the Long Sault Rapids. Despite the cooperation, the U.S. Federal Government was unable to open up the river for increased navigation and development due to political issues. Upset with this, Canada unilaterally passed two acts in 1951 which allowed projects on the St. Lawrence for power and navigation purposes. Canada attempted to build the Seaway alone, with Ontario and New York constructing the power dam. The United States considered this a security threat and asked Canada to accept a shared Seaway. The next year a proposal for a hydroelectric dam and navigation lock was submitted to the IJC for approval. In October 1952 the project was approved.

== Construction ==
Because of political stalemate and the railway companies, construction did not begin until August 19, 1954, when the entire seaway project began with a groundbreaking ceremony at the dam site. Construction was expected to last seven years and much of which was supervised by the U.S. Army Corps of Engineers. Robert Moses, Chairman of the New York Power Authority, oversaw the U.S. portion and Robert Hood Saunders, chairman of Ontario Hydro, oversaw the Canadian side of the project. The project included the main dam, the Long Sault Dam, the Eisenhower & Snell Locks, the Massena Intake, and 10.9 mi (18 km) of dikes. Robert Hood Saunders had already been elected mayor of Toronto four times when he joined Ontario Hydro. Saunders would not live to see his name on the station. He died on January 16, 1955, from injuries and shock from the previous evening when his ice-covered aircraft crashed near an airstrip in London, Ontario. He and four others were returning to Toronto from Windsor; Saunders had reportedly just delivered a speech in Detroit on the St. Lawrence Power Project. He was only 51 and at the peak of his career.

On July 1, 1958, Dr. Otto Holden, chief engineer of Hydro-electric Power Commission of Ontario, and J. Burch McMorran, Chief Engineer of the New York Power Authority, detonated 27 tonnes of explosives to demolish the cofferdam that had diverted St. Lawrence River water away from the powerhouse construction site. It took four days for the plant to become fully operational. The last generators were commissioned in 1959. Previously, in 1956, the IJC established the International St. Lawrence River Board of Control as a mechanism to regulate the river above and below the dam. Competing interests for power and navigation had to be controlled in order to maintain good function of the dam. Those interested in power and flood control desired moderate water levels and the shipping industry and power station operators wanted levels to be higher.

The dam was officially dedicated on June 27, 1959, in a ceremony attended by Moses, Queen Elizabeth II (in her capacity as monarch of Canada), Vice President of the United States Richard Nixon, and New York state governor Nelson Rockefeller. Guy Lombardo and His Royal Canadians were supposed to perform at the ceremony, but their plane was diverted due to heavy fog. The music was instead provided by the Massena Central High School band.

== Displacement ==
6,500 people in Eastern Ontario were displaced to construct the dam, including the residents of six villages and three hamlets, known as The Lost Villages, as well as some farmers before the land was flooded. The residents were given market value for their land, though there are claims it was unfair because the land prices were believed to have already been depressed due to the anticipated submergence; some residents were forcibly removed. Most were relocated to homes in new communities called South Stormont (Long Sault) or Ingleside and Iroquois. In 2008, Ontario Hydro made an official apology.

The construction and operation of the dam impacted the traditional territory used by the Native American Mohawks of Akwesasne. Over 1,200 acres (500 ha) of reserve lands and 15,000 acres (6,100 ha) of traditional lands were flooded. The group was not consulted or compensated in any way for the flooding of ten islands belonging to Akwesasne for the creation of the head pond. In 2008, a 15 year effort to address the past wrongs resulted in a proposed settlement between Ontario Power Generation and The Mohawk Council of Akwesasne. The settlement included monetary compensation, a transfer of islands originally owned by Akwesasne, and environmental stewardship.

== Floods and pollution ==
Flooding and pollution have affected fish populations on the river and in Lake St. Lawrence. Northern Pike, Walleye, Muskellunge, Lake Sturgeon and American eel have been affected. The loss of spawning grounds is also believed to have contributed to drops in their populations. Recent efforts have stabilized or increased much of the populations. In the early 1970s, a ladder was created from a decommissioned ice sluce at R.H. Saunders Generating Station designed for juvenile American Eels to head upriver, across the generating station. At 521 ft (159 m) long and 95 ft (29 m) high, it was the only one in North America and the tallest in the world at the time. By 2009, it had been upgraded and extended 984 ft (300 m) in length. OPG maintains a trap and transport program with local commercial fisherman for downstream migration. From 2006 to 2011, approximately four million young eels crossed into the upper St. Lawrence River and Lake Ontario.

Power produced by the dam was the primary reason that General Motors, Reynolds Metals and the Aluminum Company of America opened factories in the area. These factories generated severe pollution on the river. In 1984, Superfund added the General Motors site to its list of clean-up sites, due to the pollution from various chemicals, including polychlorinated biphenyls, VOCs, and phenols.

New York and Ontario have instituted programs to improve the local environment around the reservoir and its water quality. The U.S. programs were mainly instituted after the power station was re-licensed for 50 years on October 23, 2003.

R.H. Saunders Generating Station controls its environmental initiative by conducting studies, improving habitats, and coordinating electricity production during spawning seasons. In the summer of 2016, Bird Studies Canada installed a MOTUS tracking system at R.H. Saunders Generating Station that tracks the migration of 85 species of birds, bats, and large insects.

== Rehabilitation and upgrades ==
After investigations in 1990 and 1991, it was determined that generator and structural problems within the dam were due to Alkali–aggregate reaction. The power station's concrete was cracking and deteriorating while the generator stators and throat ring linings were deformed. From 1993 to 2001 extensive repairs were carried out to fix damaged concrete and mitigate concrete expansion. From 1987 to 2007 upgrades to R.H. Saunders Generating Station have increased efficiency by 16 percent. In 1998, the New York Power Authority began a $254 million refurbishment of the turbine-generators at the St. Lawrence/FDR. The project is expected to be complete in 2013.

== Design and operation ==
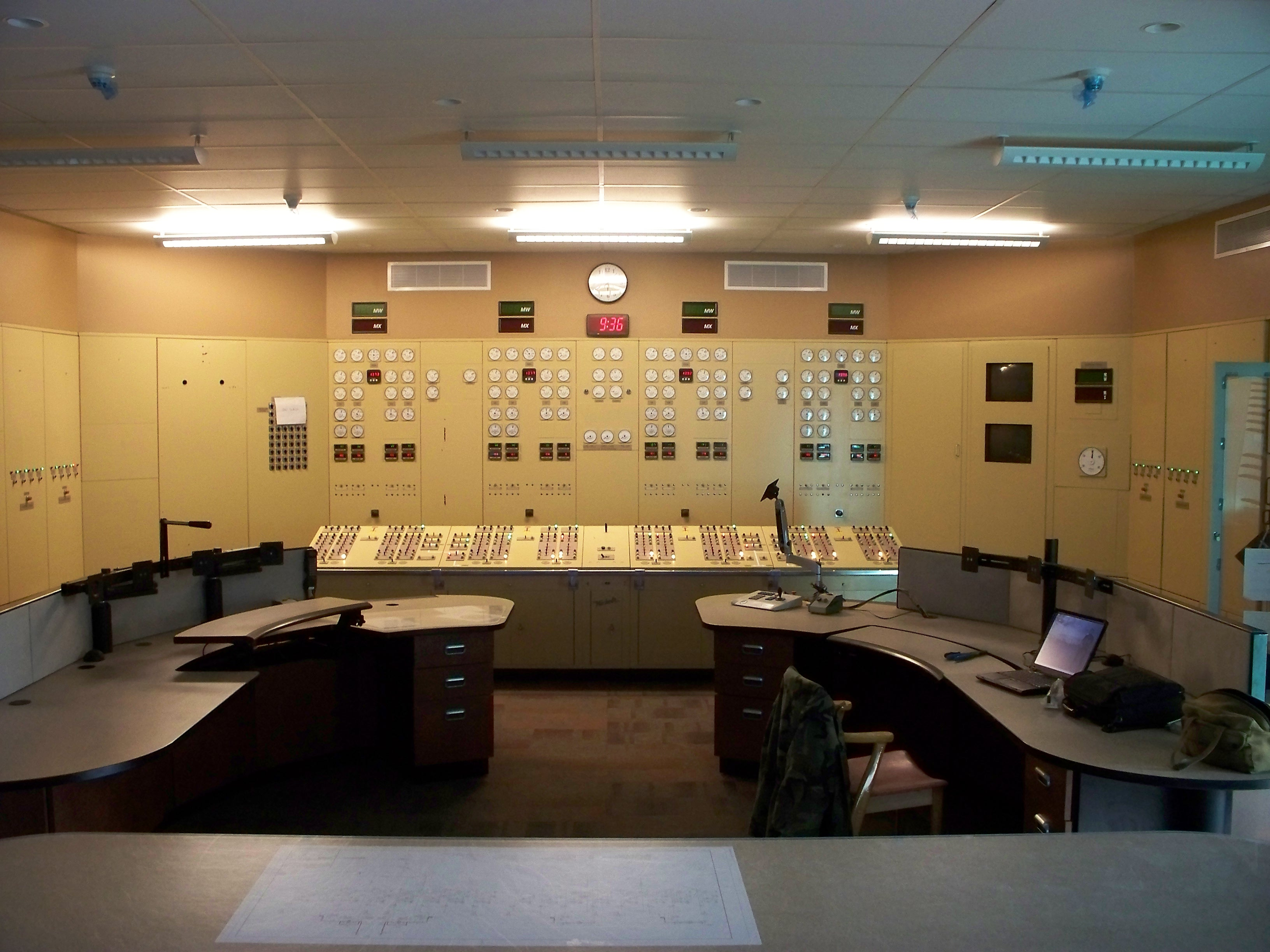
R.H. Saunders control room

The 195.5 ft (60 m) tall and 3,212 ft (979 m) long dam is situated in between the Canadian shore at Cornwall and New York's Barnhart Island. To create the reservoir, the Long Sault Dam was constructed 3.5 mi (6 km) upstream in between Barnhart Island and one of the Long Sault Islands. In between the Long Sault Island the New York shore is the Eisenhower and Snell Locks. Located 7.5 mi (12 km) upstream is the Massena Intake. Further securing the reservoir is 10.9 mi (18 km) of dikes. The Long Sault Dam, completely in the U.S., is 2,960 ft (902 m) long and 109 ft (33 m) high. It serves as a spillway to pass flood waters on the river. The Massena Intake is 721 ft (220 m) long and 108 ft (33 m) high. It provides water for industry and local civil consumption. The power station at the Moses-Saunders Dam contains 32 turbine generators. Ontario Power Generation operates units 1-16 and the New York Power Authority operates 17-32. The Canadian side of the power station, R.H. Saunders Generating Station, contains 16 x 65.3 MW fixed-pitch Kaplan turbine-generators and the U.S. power station, St. Lawrence-FDR contains 16 x 57 MW vertical fixed-pitch Kaplan turbine-generators. The dam affords the turbines 81 ft (25 m) of hydraulic head. The Eisenhower and Snell Locks can pass ships up to 730 ft (223 m) in length and 76 ft (23 m) wide a height of 38 ft (12 m) (Eisenhower) and 43 ft (13 m) (Snell).

== See also ==
- Saint Lawrence Seaway
- The Lost Villages
- Long Sault Parkway
- List of power stations in New York
- List of electrical generating stations in Ontario
- List of largest power stations in Canada
