= St. Lawrence Parks Commission =

Government agency of Ontario, Canada

- Commission des parcs du Saint-Laurent

Agency overview
- Formed: 1955; 71 years ago
- Type: Crown agency
- Jurisdiction: Government of Ontario
- Headquarters: Morrisburg, Ontario
- Minister responsible: Stan Cho, Minister of Tourism, Culture and Gaming
- Agency executives: Hollee Kew, CEO; Bob Runciman, Chair
- Key document: St. Lawrence Parks Commission Act
- Website: parks.on.ca

The St. Lawrence Parks Commission (French: Commission des parcs du Saint-Laurent) is a Crown agency of the Government of Ontario Ministry of Tourism, Culture and Gaming that manages parks and heritage sites along the shoreline of the St. Lawrence River in southeastern Ontario. It functions similarly to the Niagara Parks Commission's role in overseeing attractions and conservation on the Ontario side of the Niagara River.

== Parks and attractions ==
- Thousand Islands Parkway (including Ivy Lea Campsite, Brown's Bay Day-Use Area Park and St. Lawrence Recreation Trail)
  - Riverside-Cedar Campsite
  - St. Lawrence Recreation Trail
  - Crysler Park Marina
  - Crysler Beach
  - Upper Canada Golf Course
  - Upper Canada Migratory Bird Sanctuary
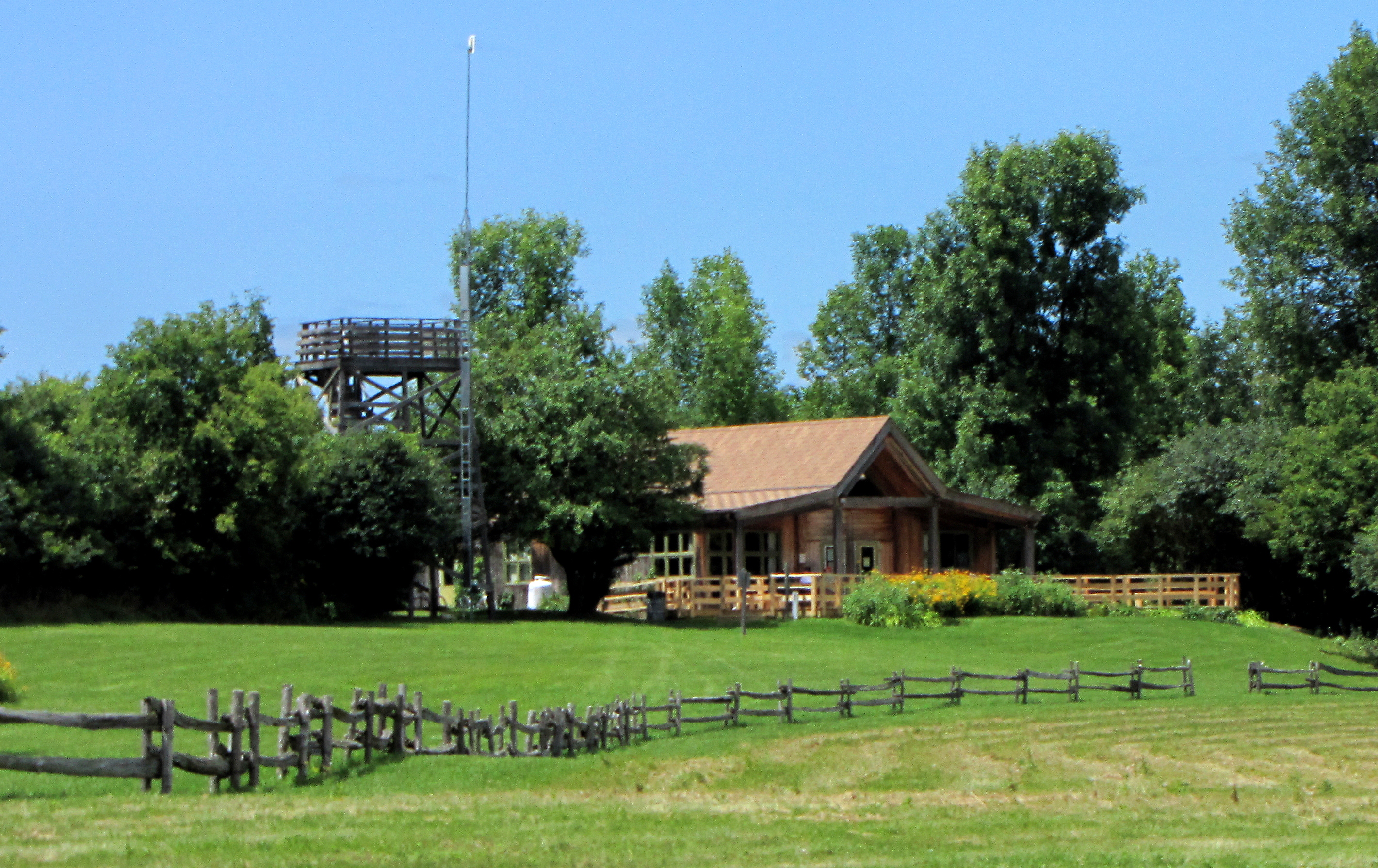
    Visitor's Centre, Upper Canada Migratory Bird Sanctuary
- Long Sault Parkway (including McLaren, Woodlands and Mille Roches)
  - Farran Park
  - Glengarry Park
- Fort Henry National Historic Site in Kingston, Ontario
- Upper Canada Village Heritage Park
  - Upper Canada Village
  - Upper Canada Village Heritage Park Information Centre
  - Queen Elizabeth Gardens
  - Battle of Crysler's Farm Visitor Centre
  - Pioneer Memorial

== See also ==
- Conservation authority (Canada)
- Conservation area
- Niagara Parks Commission
- St. Clair Parkway
- National Capital Commission
- Great Lakes / St. Lawrence Seaway System
- Ottawa River Waterway
- Rouge Park
- Ontario Parks
- Parks Canada
- Société des établissements de plein air du Québec (SEPAQ)
- Morrisburg Airport
