= Santa Cruz, Ontario =

Human settlement in Ontario, Canada

Coordinates: 44.9951°N 74.9355°W

Santa Cruz is an underwater ghost town in the Canadian province of Ontario. It is one of Ontario's Lost Villages, which were permanently flooded by the creation of the St. Lawrence Seaway in 1958.

Families and businesses in Santa Cruz were moved to the new town of Ingleside before the seaway construction commenced.
