= Munnu Kasliwal =

- Born: Pramod Kasliwal; 7 July 1958; Jaipur, India
- Died: 23 August 2012 (aged 54)
- Occupations: Jewelry designer and connoisseur
- Spouse: Kalpana Kasliwal
- Children: Siddharth Kasliwal, Samarth Kasliwal
- Website: www.munnuthegempalace.com

Munnu Kasliwal was a jewelry maker and late owner of the "Gem Palace" in Jaipur. "Gem Palace" is a lavish emporium, primarily containing intricate jewelry pieces. His family served as the crown jewelers to country's Maharaja since the mid-18th century. Kasliwal was born on 7 July 1958 in Jaipur, India. Although not widely known such as Bulgari or Cartier, Kasliwal created jewelry for many celebrities including Nicole Kidman and Diana, Princess of Wales in 1992. Kasliwal came from a long lineage of jewel craftsman and used traditional Indian and techniques. He was inspired by the Mughal Empire, said to be his "Hallmark of Style". Kasliwal attended Xavier's Secondary School. He then attended the University of Rajasthan where he pursued a degree in Business Management.

According to Muriel Brandolini, "Gem Palace was like the den of Ali Baba, and you could never leave with empty hands". Munnu's collections included rubies, opals, gold links, and many colored diamonds. But what made Kasliwal stand out from the others was his pursuit to obtain precious jewels and intricate pieces from all over the world. For Kasliwal, inspiration was all around him. India's very rich history brought upon all of the beautiful pieces that Gem Palace offered. Vibrant colors and regal pieces were draped on the countries wealthiest. As he received more press many would stop at the Gem Palace just to spend the day marveling at his collections. Kasliwal was impressive. Kasliwal used intricate enamel work called kundan. Kundan showed the mastery Kasliwal had achieved. He learned from a young age to be intrigues by precious things. Instead of being mainstream, Kasliwal did the opposite hence why he was considered a secret until one found out about him and his various collections. Kasliwal did the most he could to obtain precious gems to work with for his pieces. He once rode through the mines of Golconda accompanied by winding roads to acquire a rare stone.

In 2001, Kasliwal created a collection for Metropolitan Museum of Art. and showcased intricate pieces resembling those seen during the Mughal Empire. Five separate collections were created, inspired from the likes of the Greek and Roman Empires.

Kasliwal died on 12 August 2012 from brain cancer. The operations and ownership of the emporium was passed along to Siddharth Kasliwal.

In April 2014, the exhibition "India - Jewels that Enchanted the World" in Moscow Kremlin Museum was dedicated by its organizers, the World Diamond Museum and State Museums of Moscow Kremlin, to the memory of Munnu Kasliwal.
