= Dickinson's Landing, Ontario =

Underwater ghost town in Ontario, Canada

Coordinates: 44.9934°N 74.9249°W

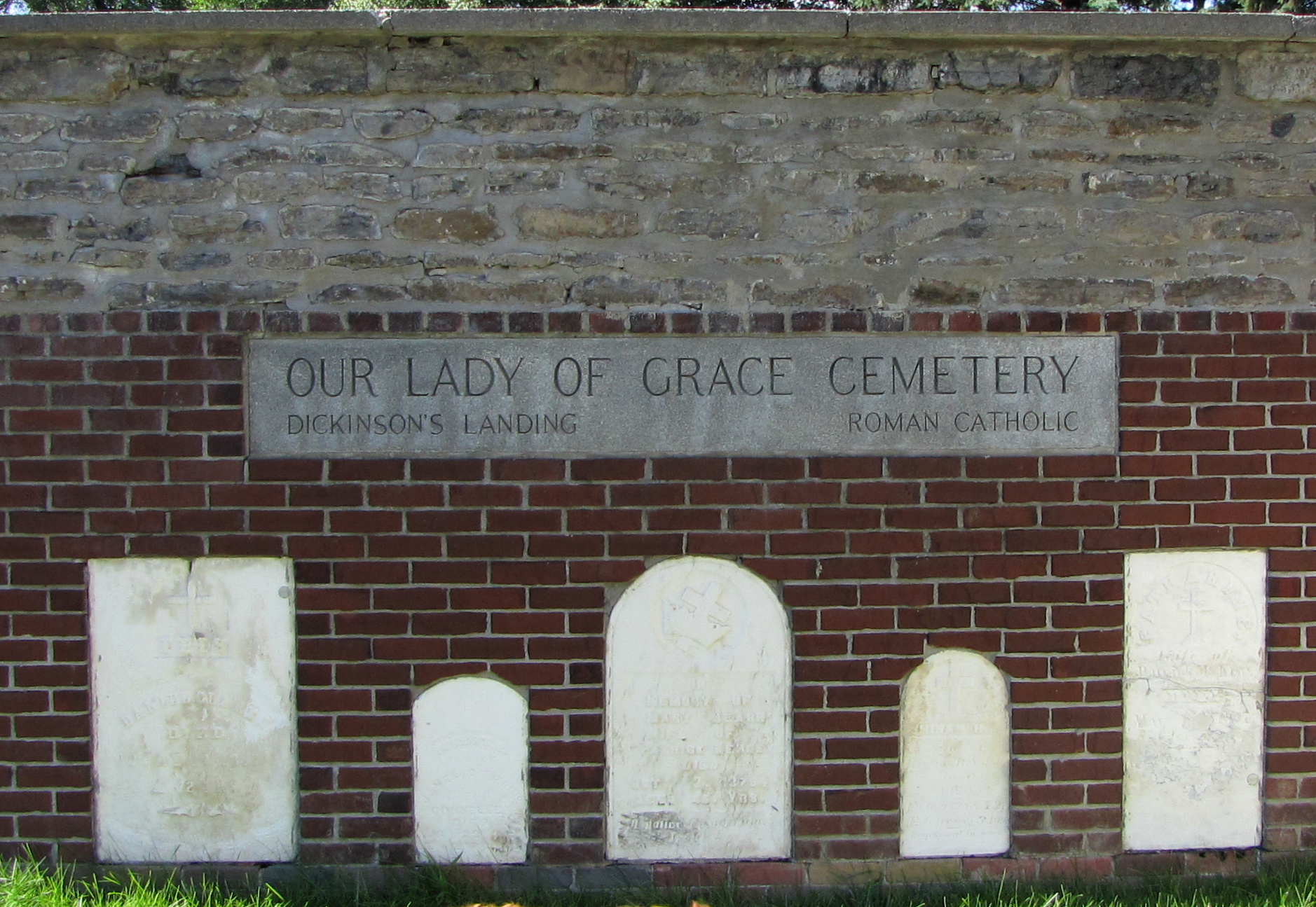
Tombstone's from Our Lady of Grace Cemetery, Dickinson's Landing, now in Pioneer Memorial, Upper Canada Village

Dickinson's Landing is an underwater ghost town in the Canadian province of Ontario. It is one of Ontario's Lost Villages, which were permanently flooded by the creation of the St. Lawrence Seaway in 1958.

Families and businesses in Dickinson's Landing were moved to the new town of Ingleside before the seaway construction commenced.

== History ==
In approximately 1669, Dickinson's Landing was founded by French explorer La Salle as a trading post at the rapids that were known as Long Sault. There was a natural formation of a long low shelf of land at the water's edge that facilitated mooring of watercraft. Later, during the days of the stagecoach, the small hamlet provided a place where weary travelers could stop and rest, whether they arrived by land or river. In 1860, the Prince of Wales, Albert Edward visited Dickinson's Landing, stopped at the train station and took a ride over Long Sault rapids in a steam. Albert Edward would later become King Edward VII. As the then prince had walked from a wharf onto the steamer, the local citizens requested a remembrance of his visit and therefore the post office in Dickinson's Landing was renamed "Wales" in honor of his visit.

The first practicing medical practitioner was a woman whom the town's residents referred to as Granny Hoople. She learned her craft after living amongst the Native Americans for seven years. She had been taken captive after the Native Americans burned her childhood home, killed her parents, took her brother captive and then killed him after he became a troublemaker with them. In 1811, an actual medical doctor, named Dr. Archibald moved to the hamlet.

The Landing provided income to its residents by having a cheese factory (that had been home to a tannery), a cooper shop, two shoemakers, a shop that fabricated buggies, furniture and coffins. In 1863, a Catholic church, named Our Lady of Grace, was erected.

== St. Lawrence Seaway construction ==
During the construction of the St. Lawrence Seaway, a number of Canadian towns alongside the St. Lawrence River were flooded in a 20,000 acre planned flood to allow for the expansion of the St. Lawrence River. Several of those towns, including Aultsville, Farran's Point, Dickinson's Landing and Wales were planned to be eliminated and residents and structures were moved to two newly created towns named, Ingleside and Long Sault. Those towns are now referred to as the "Lost Villages". In addition to the relocation of buildings, the project called for movement of roads, and railroad tracks. Two significant towns, Iroquois and Morrisburg had sections built on higher ground. The flooding officially began on what became known as Inundation Day which was scheduled for 1 July 1958.

The widening project of the St. Lawrence River, had been planned since 1941 and included cooperation between both the American and Canadian sides of the river. The agreement, signed 19 March 1941, detailed plans for Ontario Hydro and American power companies to significantly increase the power potential by 1.1 million horsepower, each, from the development of an international rapids section of the seaway. This was desired to improve wartime power demands although the construction occurred well after the war ended. This was in part, due to the fact that the United States Congress did not ratify these plans due to more immediate concerns posed by the Pearl Harbor Attack and other interests. The original plans further called to reduce the severity of the rapids at Long Sault by effectively flooding the rapids. Further, a deep water canal was planned for the American side to permit ocean-going vessels to travel further inland. The plans required the Canadian side of the river to take the brunt of the flooding as the shore line in Ontario was shallower than in New York State.
