= Wales, Ontario =

Ghost town in Ontario, Canada

Coordinates: 45.0099°N 74.9202°W

Wales is a ghost town in the Canadian province of Ontario. It is one of Ontario's Lost Villages, which were permanently flooded by the creation of the St. Lawrence Seaway in 1958. The town was named for the Prince of Wales (later Edward VII) who visited the area during his Canadian tour of 1860. Wales was built on the land grant of Dr. James Stuart, of the King's Royal Regiment of New York. From 1810 to 1957, five generations of the Stuart family lived on this property.

Families and businesses in Wales were moved to the new town of Ingleside before the seaway construction commenced.

Wales, about two miles away from the old shoreline, was the only inland town affected by the flooding, as the community was located in a creek valley below the new waterline.
