= Sheek Island =

Island in Ontario, Canada

Coordinates: 45.0152°N 74.8499°W

Sheek Island is an island in the St. Lawrence River in the Canadian province of Ontario. It is considered to be one of Ontario's Lost Villages, which were permanently flooded by the creation of the St. Lawrence Seaway in 1958. While much of the island has been flooded, a portion of it remains above water, but is not populated.

Sheek Island was occupied primarily by family farms and recreational properties. In 1914, Levi Addison Ault donated a family property on the island to the Township of Cornwall, which became Ault Park. After the island was flooded by the Seaway project, Ault Park was rebuilt on the new shoreline near Long Sault.

From 1956 to 1958, archaeologists conducted excavations in Ault Park, and believed that they might have found remnants of a 3500-year old native village. The University of Toronto petitioned for an injunction against the Seaway project so that the excavations could continue, but they were not successful. A number of artifacts were taken from the site for further study.
