= Lost Villages =

Communities submerged by the Saint Lawrence Seaway

Coordinates: 44.9930°N 74.9241°W

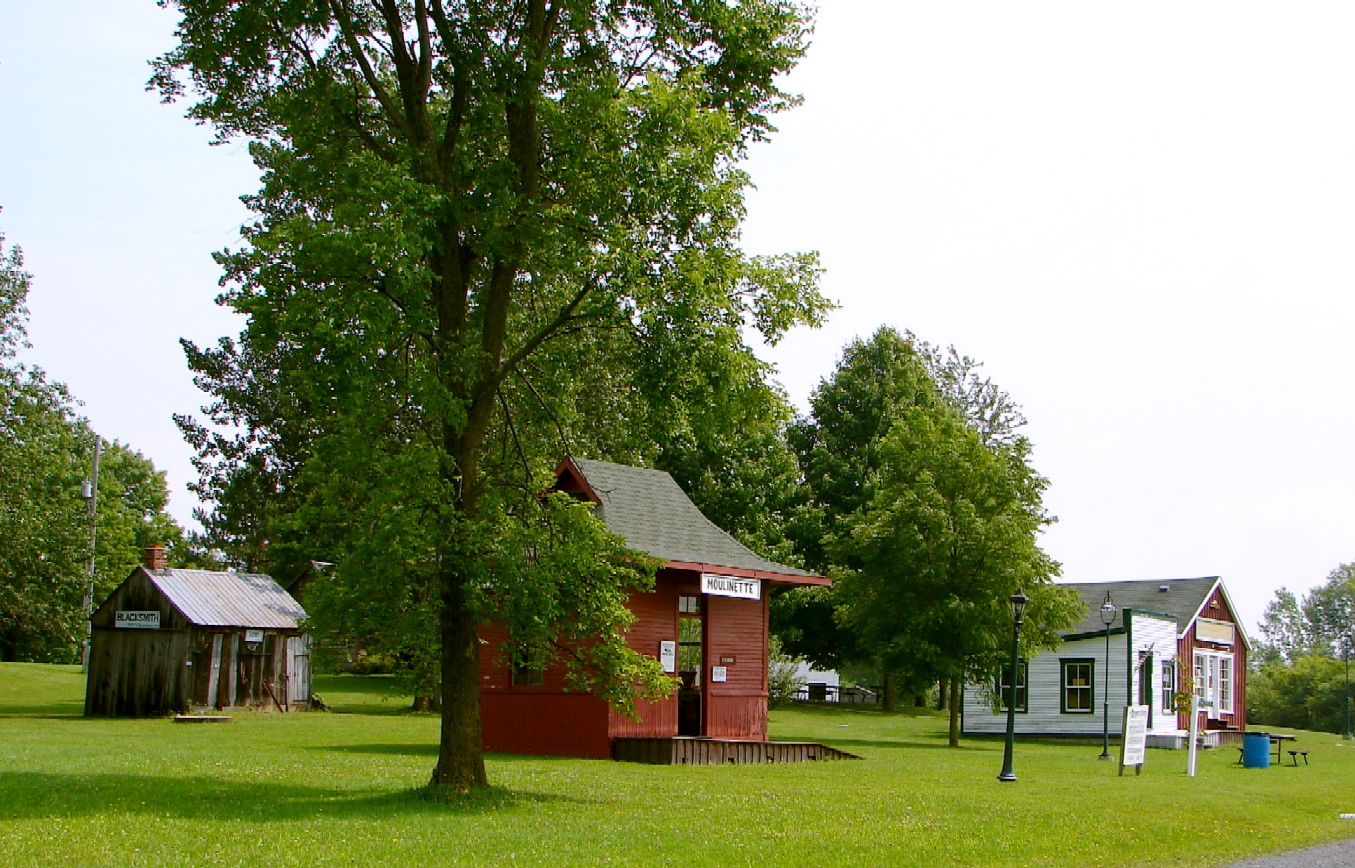
Lost Villages Museum near Long Sault

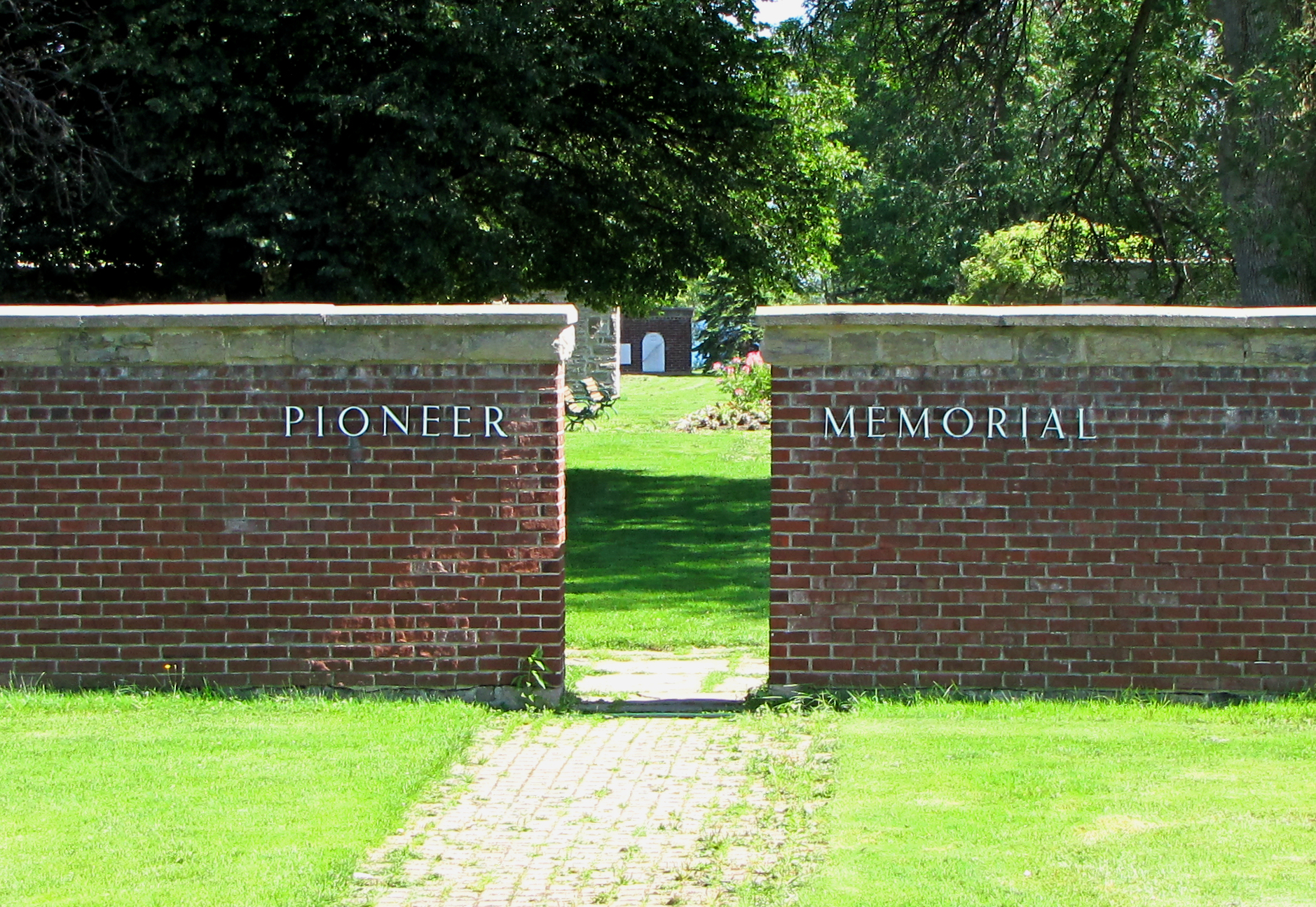
Entrance to Pioneer Memorial that contains headstones from cemeteries of the Lost Villages

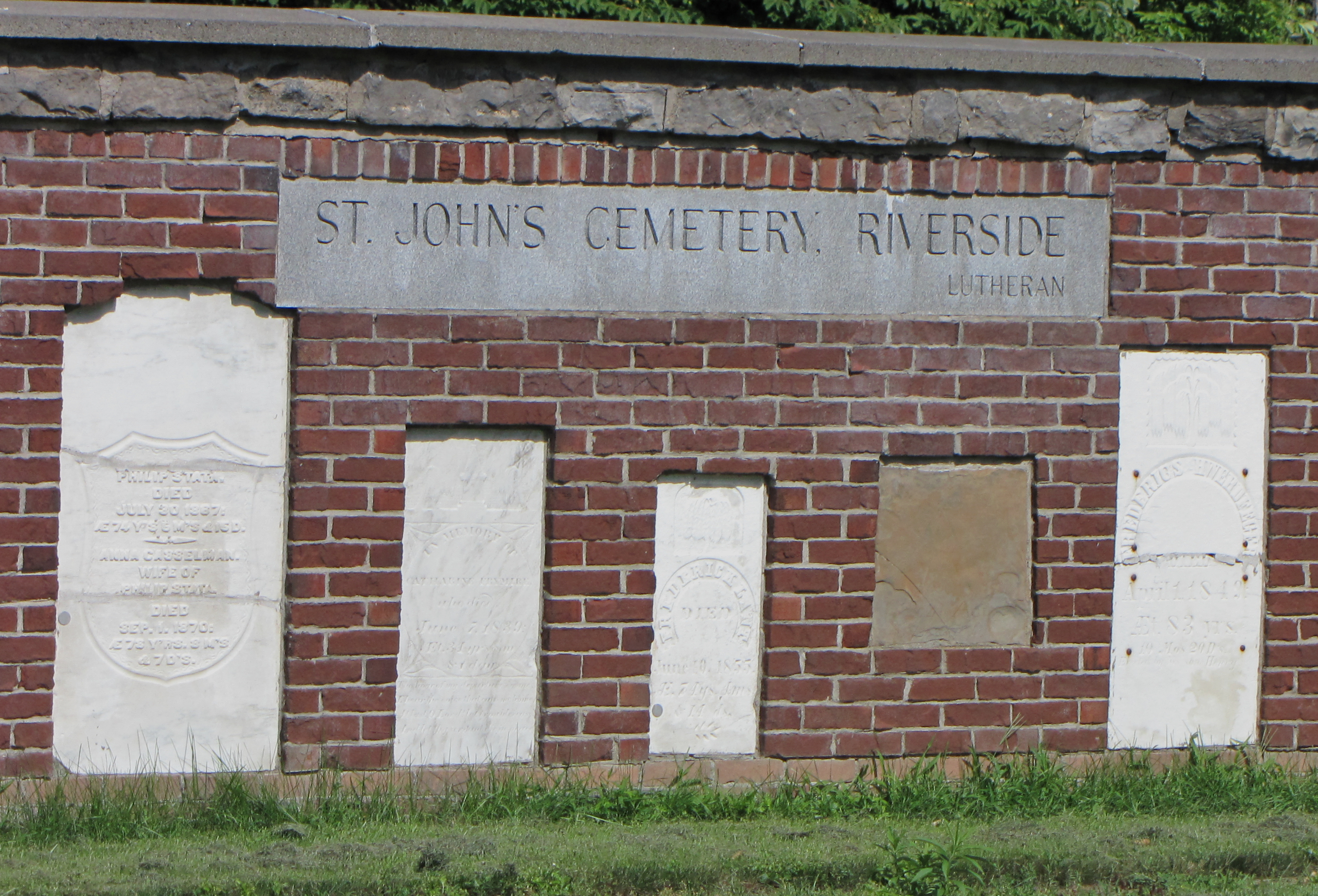
Mounted tombstones from St. John's Cemetery, Pioneer Memorial

Animation showing the change to the St. Lawrence River as a result of the Moses-Saunders Power Dam

The Lost Villages were ten communities (nine conventional villages and a populated island) in the Canadian province of Ontario, in the former townships of Cornwall and Osnabruck (now South Stormont) near Cornwall, which were permanently submerged by the creation of the Saint Lawrence Seaway in 1958.

The flooding was planned as the result of the Moses-Saunders Power Dam construction, which began in August 1954. In the weeks and months leading up to the inundation, families and businesses in the affected communities were moved to the new planned communities of Long Sault and Ingleside. These negotiations were controversial, however, as many residents of the communities felt that market value compensation was insufficient since the Seaway plan had already depressed property values in the region.

The town of Iroquois was also flooded, but was relocated 1.5 kilometres (0.93 mi) north rather than being abandoned. Another community, Morrisburg, was partially submerged as well, but the area to be flooded was moved to higher ground within the same townsite. In all, approximately 6,500 people were displaced by the project, 530 buildings moved, and countless other homes, schools, and businesses demolished. A portion of the provincial Highway 2 in the area was flooded; the highway was rebuilt along a Canadian National Railway right-of-way in the area.

At 8 a.m. on July 1, 1958 (a date locally remembered as Inundation Day), a large cofferdam was demolished, allowing the flooding to begin. Four days later, all of the former townsites were fully underwater. Parts of the New York shoreline were flooded by the project as well, but no communities were lost on the American side of the river.

== Legacy ==
A museum in Ault Park near Long Sault is devoted to the Lost Villages, including several historic buildings salvaged from the communities. Other buildings from the villages were moved to the site of Upper Canada Village in Morrisburg. The flooded area also includes Crysler's Farm, where a major battle was fought during the War of 1812. A monument commemorating the battle was also moved from Crysler's Farm to Upper Canada Village.

Although Save Ontario Shipwrecks generally surveys shipwrecks, chapters also explored several of the Lost Villages sites. Guard Lock 21, which was constructed in 1885/86, was flooded in 1936 as headwater for the Hydro dam at Cornwall. Lock 21 of the former Cornwall Canal (since replaced by the St. Lawrence Seaway) is a popular scuba diving site, a few feet from the shore along the Parkway. Mille Roches Power House (1901) at Cornwall was demolished prior to inundation in 1955 with the new powerdam and seaway nearing completion.

In some locations, a few remnants of sidewalks and building foundations can still be seen under the water, or even on the shoreline when water levels are sufficiently low. In 2013, the photographer Louis Helbig documented the presence of some of these features using aerial photography. Some high points of land in the flooded area remained above water as islands, and are connected by the Long Sault Parkway.

== The Lost Villages ==
The "Lost Villages" were:

- Aultsville
- Dickinson's Landing
- Farran's Point
- Maple Grove
- Mille Roches
- Moulinette
- Santa Cruz
- Sheek's Island
- Wales
- Woodlands
