= Maple Grove, Ontario (ghost town) =

Ghost town in Ontario, Canada

Coordinates: 45.0216°N 74.8054°W

Maple Grove is an underwater ghost town in the Canadian province of Ontario. It is one of Ontario's Lost Villages, which were permanently flooded by the creation of the St. Lawrence Seaway in 1958.

Families and businesses in Maple Grove were moved by Ontario Hydro to the new town of Long Sault before the seaway construction commenced. On August 10, 1954, prime minister Louis St. Laurent, premier Leslie Frost and various U.S. officials turned the first shovelful of earth in Maple Grove. Jeremiah French came from Vermont and arrived at Maple Grove in 1784. He started out with nothing more than a tiny settlers' cottage which over time expanded into a huge flour and saw mills operation. The old reminder of the lost settlement is the relocated Maple Grove Cemetery on Vincent Massey Drive. The old burial grounds were located along the old alignment of Highway 2 near Robertson Creek.
