= Woodlands, Ontario =

Ghost town in Ontario, Canada

Coordinates: 44.9941°N 74.9515°W

Woodlands is an underwater ghost town in the Canadian province of Ontario. It is one of Ontario's Lost Villages, which were permanently flooded by the creation of the St. Lawrence Seaway in 1958.

The village was founded in 1784 by German-speaking United Empire Loyalist from New York. It had a population of about 70 people at the time of its flooding. It was known, in the 1950s, for the cottages that lined the road adjacent to the then bank of the St Lawrence River.

Families and businesses in Woodlands were moved to the new town of Ingleside before the seaway construction commenced.
