= Upper Canada Village =

Living museum in Ontario, Canada

Coordinates: 44°56′50.05″N 75°04′00.74″W

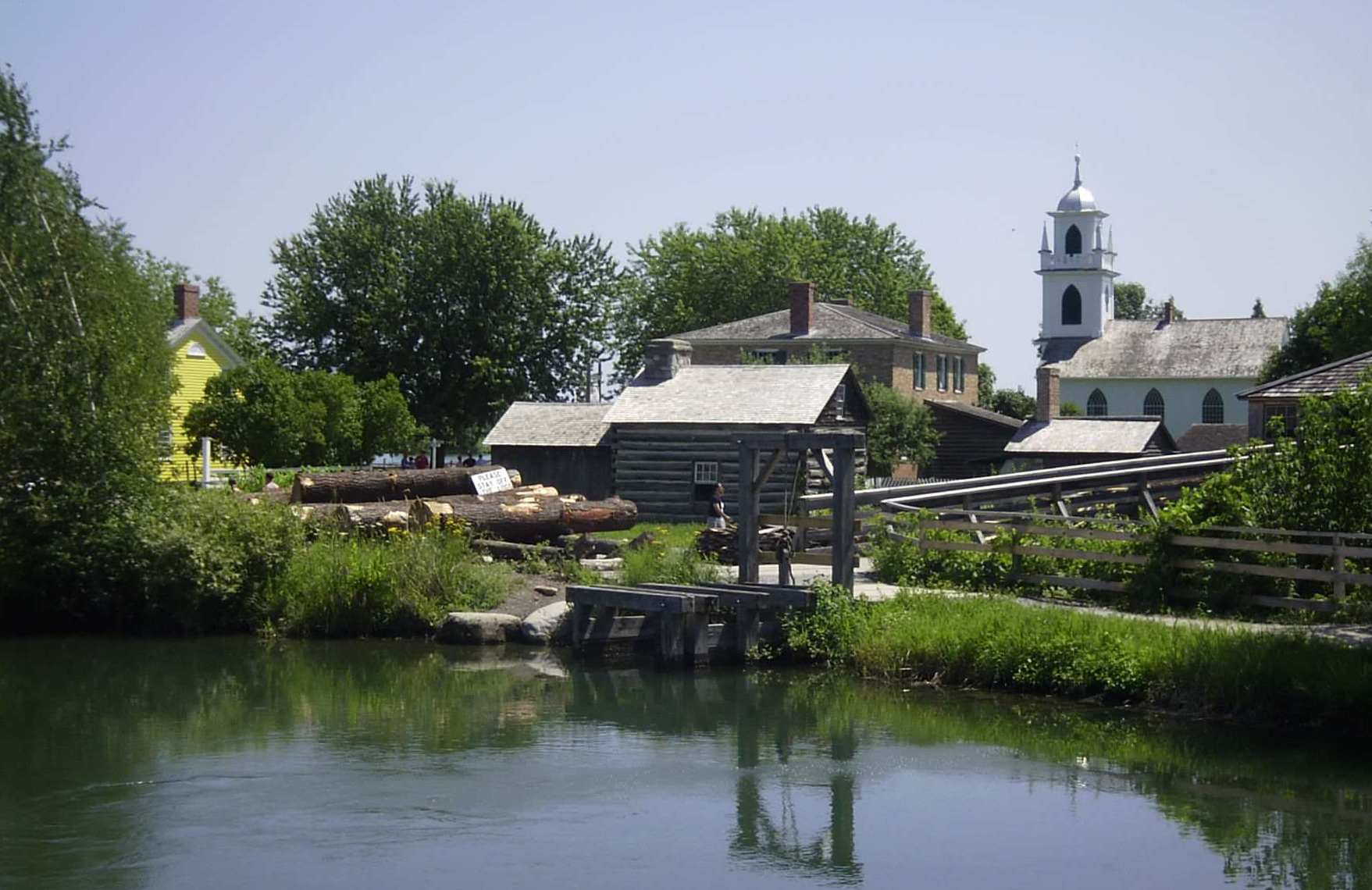
- Established: 1961
- Location: Morrisburg, Ontario, Canada.
- Type: Living museum
- Owner: St. Lawrence Parks Commission
- Website: uppercanadavillage.com

Upper Canada Village is a heritage park near Morrisburg, Ontario, which depicts a 19th-century village in Upper Canada.

== History ==
Construction of Upper Canada Village began in 1958 as part of the St. Lawrence Seaway project, which required the permanent flooding of ten communities in the area, known as The Lost Villages. Upper Canada Village was a part of the project's heritage preservation plan. Many of the buildings in Upper Canada Village were transported directly from the villages to be flooded.

The park, owned and operated by the St. Lawrence Parks Commission, was opened to the public in 1961.

Other buildings from the Lost Villages were moved to Ault Park, where they comprise a living museum run by the Lost Villages Historical Society.

The park also incorporates a memorial to the Battle of Crysler's Farm, a War of 1812 battle which also took place on land submerged by the Seaway project.

== Collection ==
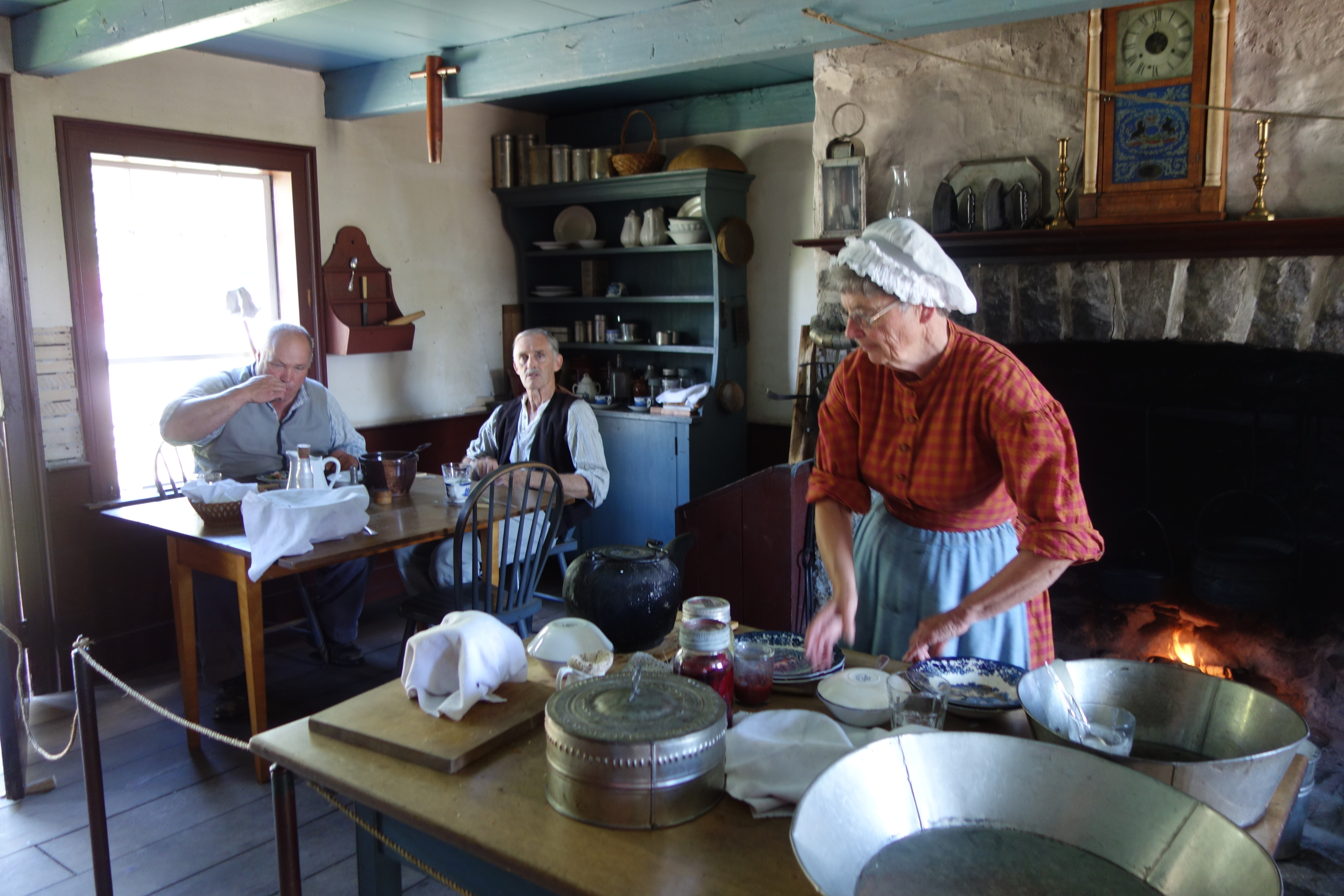
Historical reenactment at Upper Canada Village

Upper Canada Village endeavours to depict life in a rural English Canadian setting during the year 1866. Featured at the site are over 40 historical buildings, including several working mills (woollen mill, grist-mill and sawmill) and trades buildings (blacksmith, tinsmith, cabinetmaker, cooper, bakery, cheese-maker). Farming is demonstrated through the growing, harvesting or processing of heritage vegetables and livestock. Aspects of late 19th-century domestic arts, social life, music, religion, and politics are also discussed, interpreted and demonstrated by staff dressed in clothing of the period. Local gardens in the village feature the flora and fauna commonly grown in the summer.

== In film ==
The 1973 version of The Adventures of Tom Sawyer, starring Josh Albee, Buddy Ebsen, Jane Wyatt and Vic Morrow was shot entirely there. In 2013, a documentary named Tell the World was filmed, it was made in collaboration by the Australian Union Conference and South Pacific Division, both structures of the General Conference of Seventh-day Adventists. It starred local actors including Tommie-Amber Pirie as Ellen Harmon.

== Affiliations ==
The Museum is affiliated with: CMA, CHIN, and Virtual Museum of Canada.
