= South Stormont =

Township in Ontario, Canada

- Township (lower-tier)
- Township of South Stormont
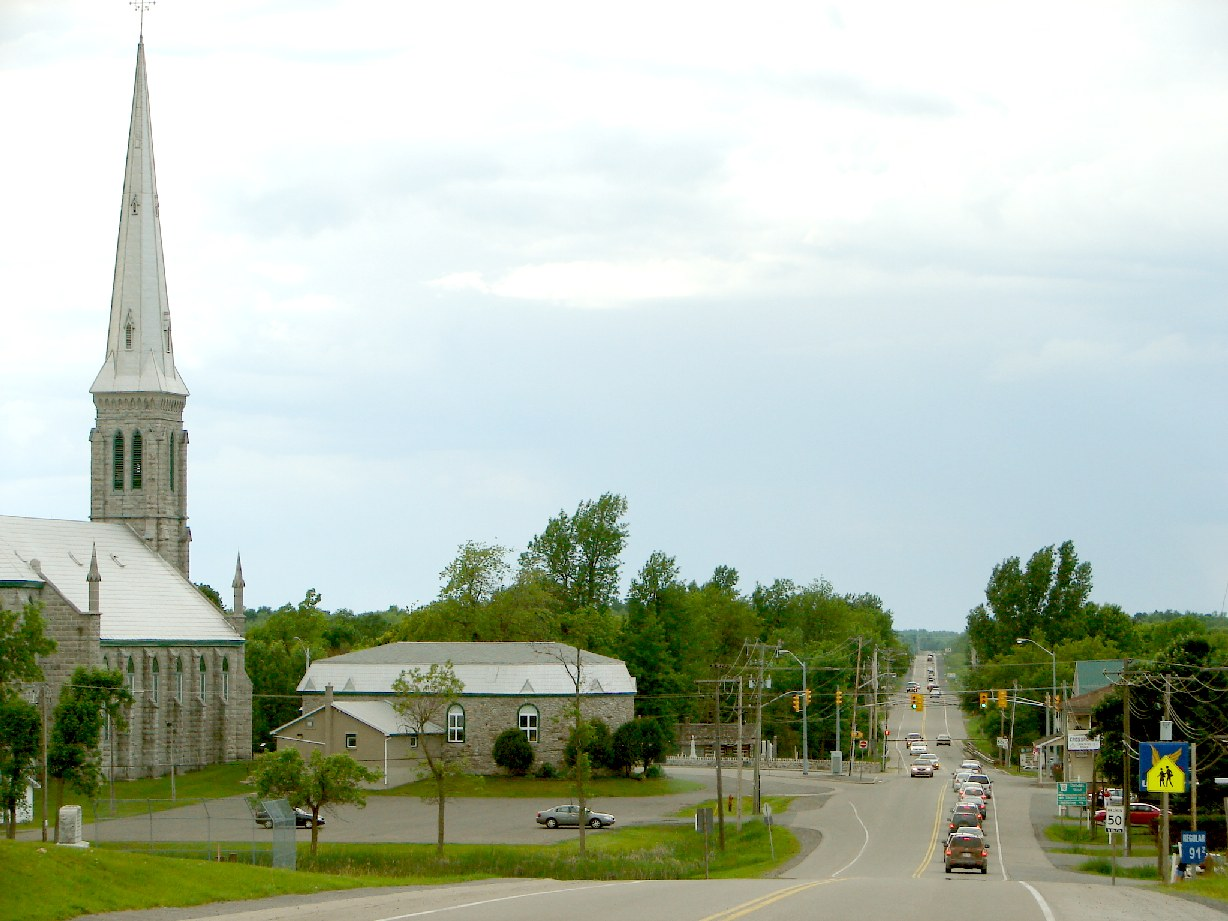
- Community of St. Andrews West

- Location within United Counties of Stormont, Dundas and Glengarry Location within Southern Ontario
- Coordinates: 45°05′N 74°58′W
- Country: Canada
- Province: Ontario
- County: Stormont, Dundas and Glengarry
- Formed: January 1, 1998

Government
  - Type: Township
  - Mayor: Bryan McGillis
  - Deputy Mayor: Andrew Guindon
  - Federal riding: Stormont—Dundas—Glengarry
  - Prov. riding: Stormont—Dundas—South Glengarry

Area
  - Land: 447.71 km^{2} (172.86 sq mi)

Population (2021)
  - Total: 13,570
  - Density: 30.3/km^{2} (78/sq mi)
- Time zone: UTC-5 (Eastern (EST))
  - Summer (DST): UTC-4 (Eastern Daylight (EDT))
- Postal code FSA: K0C
- Area codes: 613, 343
- Website: www.southstormont.ca

South Stormont is a township in eastern Ontario, Canada, in the United Counties of Stormont, Dundas and Glengarry. It is located 53 kilometres (33 mi) southeast of Ottawa. South Stormont borders on, but does not include, the city of Cornwall.

== Communities ==
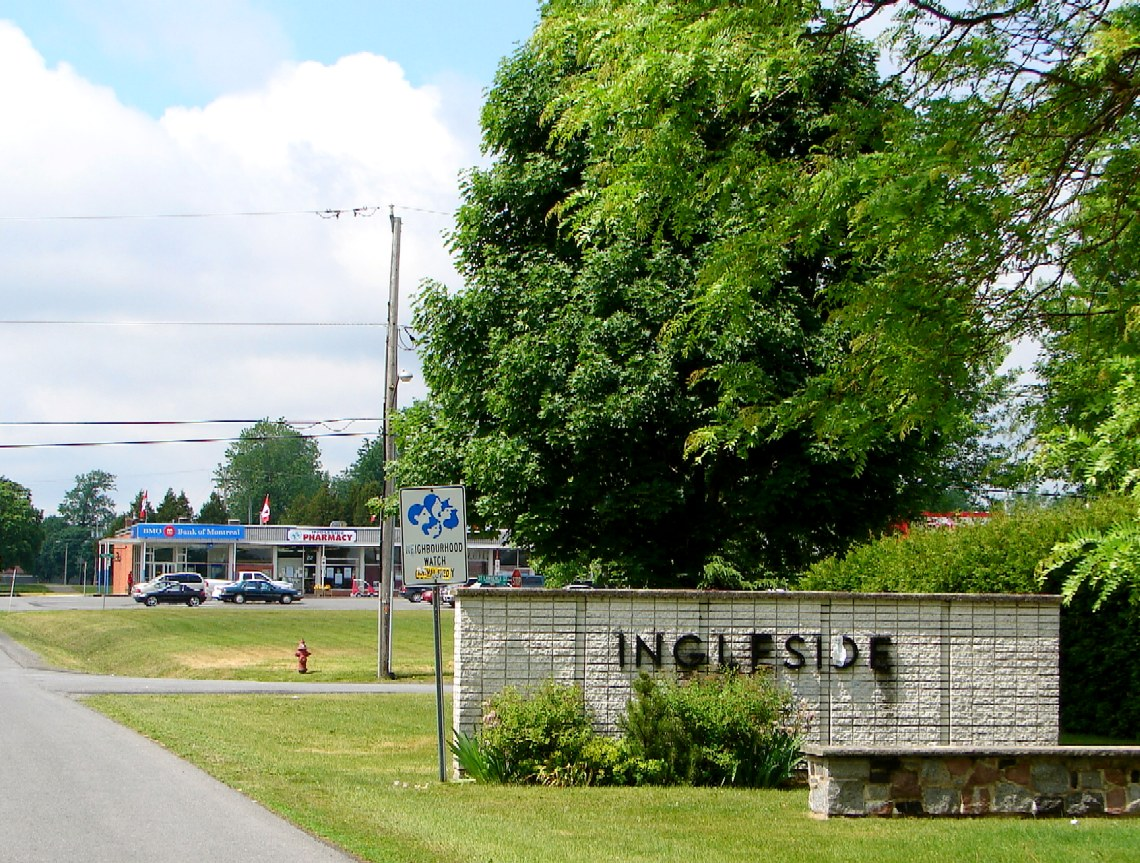
Ingleside

The township of South Stormont comprises a number of villages and hamlets. It includes the following communities:

- Cornwall Township: Beaver Glen, Bonville, Harrison's Corners, Long Sault, Northfield, Rosedale Terrace, St. Andrews West; Black River, McMillans Corners (partially), Sandfield Mills; Churchill Heights, Northfield Station, Lakeview Heights,
- Osnabruck Township: Ingleside, Lunenburg, Newington, Osnabruck Centre; Ault Island, Bush Glen, Bunker Hill, Dixon, Gallingertown, North Lunenburg, North Valley, Pleasant Valley, Sandtown; Cedar Grove,

In addition, the township would have been home to the nine Lost Villages which were flooded to create the St. Lawrence Seaway:

- Maple Grove, Mille Roches, Moulinette, Sheek's Island in Cornwall Township
- Aultsville, Dickinson's Landing, Farran's Point, Santa Cruz, Wales, Woodlands in Osnabruck Township

== History ==
Cornwall and Osnabruck were two of the original eight "Royal Townships" established along the Saint Lawrence River in Upper Canada. Cornwall was named for King George III's eldest son, Prince George, Prince of Wales, who also held the title of Duke of Cornwall. Osnabruck was named after a title formerly held by the King's second son, Prince Frederick, who at one time was Prince-Bishop of Osnabrück in Lower Saxony.

This area was first settled by members of Sir John Johnson's King's Royal Regiment of New York, and became Stormont County in 1792.

The Lost Villages, ten ghost towns which were flooded by the construction of the Saint Lawrence Seaway in 1958, were located in the former Cornwall and Osnabruck Townships. The communities of Long Sault and Ingleside were newly built to accommodate displaced residents of the flooded villages. Due to this relocation, the towns were entirely planned from their inception – a rarity in Ontario. Several streets in the two communities are named for the flooded settlements.

The township was established on January 1, 1998, with the amalgamation of the former Townships of Cornwall and Osnabruck. Jim Brownell was its first reeve.

== Demographics ==
In the 2021 Census of Population conducted by Statistics Canada, South Stormont had a population of 13,570 living in 5,412 of its 5,583 total private dwellings, a change of 3.5% from its 2016 population of 13,110. With a land area of 447.71 km^{2} (172.86 sq mi), it had a population density of 30.3/km^{2} (78.5/sq mi) in 2021.

Canada census – South Stormont community profile

	2021	2016	2011
Population	13,570 (+3.5% from 2016)	13,110 (3.9% from 2011)	12,617 (0.8% from 2006)
Land area	447.71 km^{2} (172.86 sq mi)	447.58 km^{2} (172.81 sq mi)	447.50 km^{2} (172.78 sq mi)
Population density	30.3/km^{2} (78/sq mi)	29.3/km^{2} (76/sq mi)	28.2/km^{2} (73/sq mi)
Median age	48.0 (M: 47.2, F: 49.2)	46.8 (M: 45.6, F: 47.8)	45.5 (M: 45.1, F: 45.9)
Private dwellings	5,583 (total) 5,412 (occupied)	5277 (total)	4991 (total)
Median household income	$92,000	$76,092

References: 2021 2016 2011

Historical census populations – South Stormont

Year	Pop.	±%
1986	9,479	—
1991	11,008	+16.1%
1996	11,584	+5.2%
2001	11,941	+3.1%

Year	Pop.	±%
2006	12,520	+4.8%
2011	12,617	+0.8%
2016	13,110	+3.9%
2021	13,570	+3.5%

Population amounts prior to 2001 is total of Cornwall TP and Osnabruck TP.

== Local government ==
The township of South Stormont is governed by three councillors, a deputy mayor and a mayor (reeve). The term length is four years. South Stormont also conducts elections on the internet, using a secure, cost-efficient website and an automated telephone voting system.

- Mayor - Bryan McGillis
- Deputy Mayor - Andrew Guindon
- Councillor - Reid McIntyre
- Councillor - Jennifer MacIsaac
- Councillor - Cindy Woods

The South Stormont Town Hall and administrative offices are located in Long Sault.

== Notable residents ==
- Burial place of Simon Fraser, famous Canadian explorer
- NHL player Jesse Winchester
- NHL head coach Doug Carpenter

== See also ==
- List of townships in Ontario
- List of francophone communities in Ontario
