= Burlin =

Burlin is both a surname and a given name. Notable people with the name include:

Surname

- Anatoliy Burlin (born 1990), Ukrainian football midfielder
- Dan Burlin (born 1980), Swedish football player
- Johan Burlin (born 1989), Swedish ice hockey player
- Natalie Curtis Burlin (1875–1921), American ethnomusicologist
- Paul Burlin (1886–1969), American painter

Given name

- Burlin White (1895–1971), American baseball catcher and manager
