= Frank Bestow Wiborg =

American businessman (1855–1930)

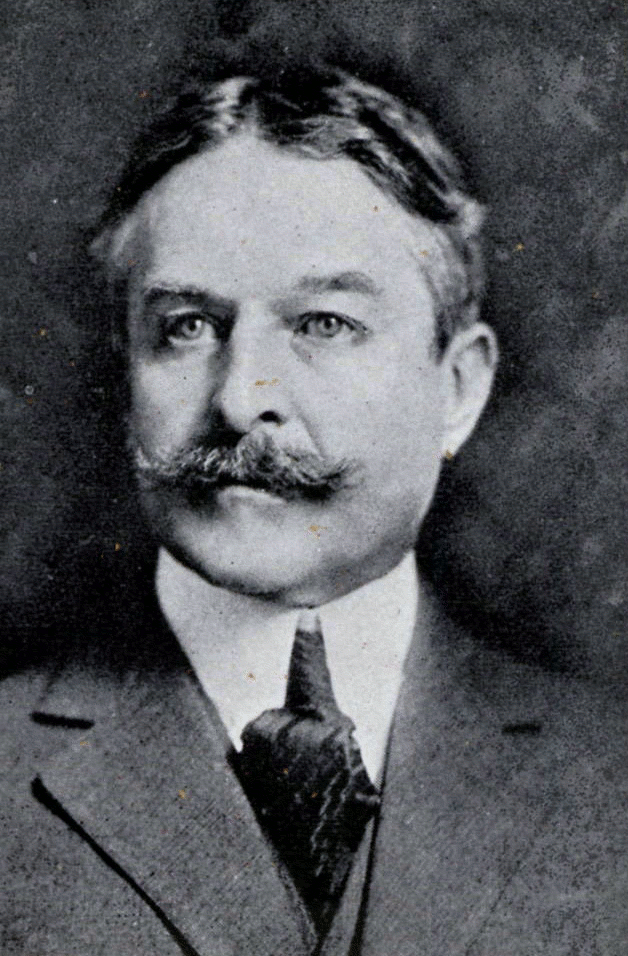
- Wiborg c. 1900
- Born: April 30, 1855; Cleveland, Ohio
- Died: May 12, 1930 (aged 75); Park Avenue, New York City
- Education: Chickering Institute
- Known for: Ault & Wiborg Company
- Spouse: Adaline Moulton Sherman (m. 1882–1917)
- Children: 3, Mary Hoyt Wiborg, Sara Sherman Wiborg, and Olga Wiborg
- Parent: Henry Paulinus Wiborg

Signature
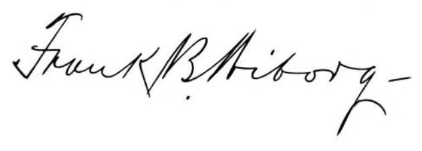

Frank Bestow Wiborg (April 30, 1855 – May 12, 1930) was an American businessman from Cincinnati who, with Levi Addison Ault, created the ink manufacturer Ault & Wiborg Company.

== Early life ==
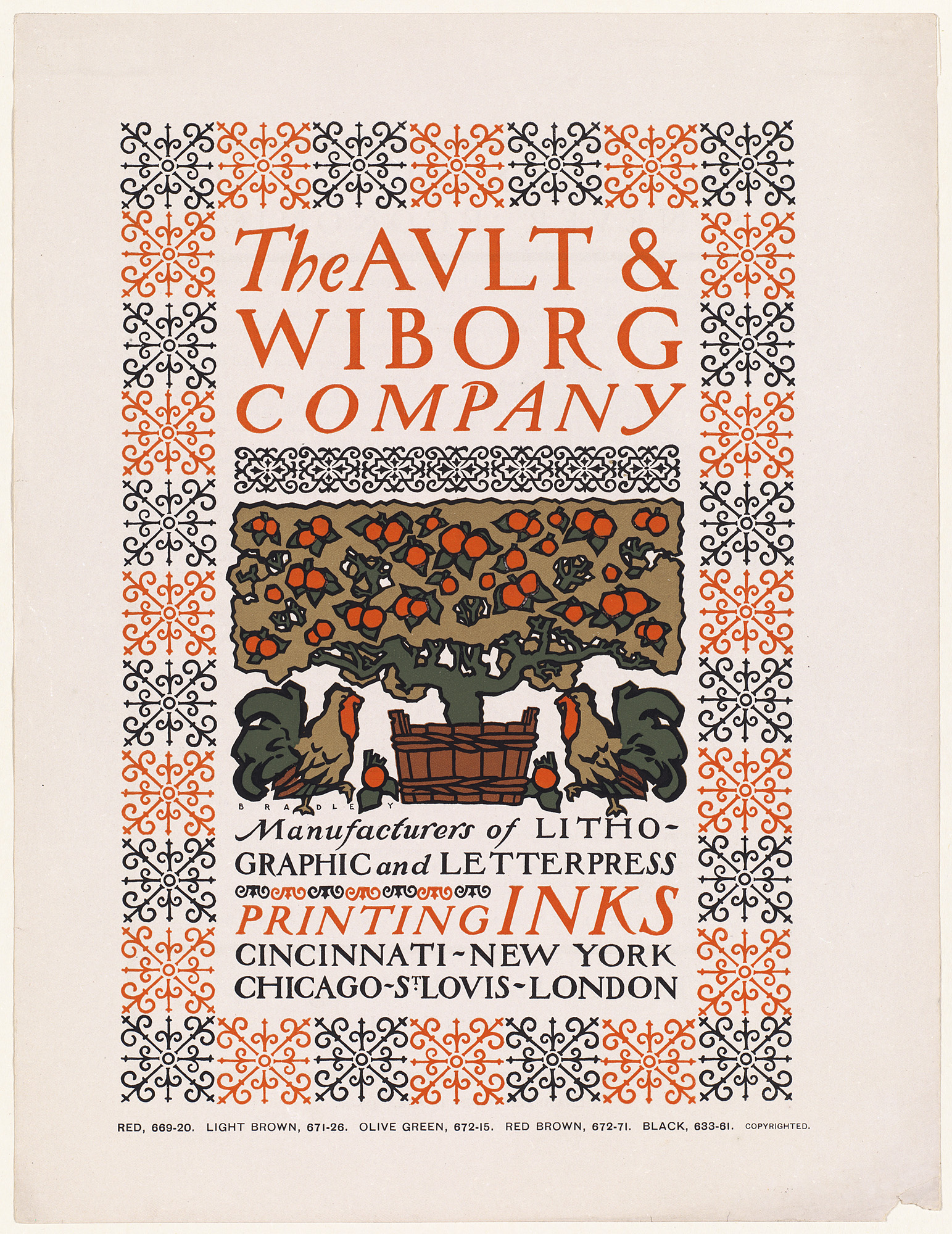
The Ault & Wiborg Company lithograph advertising poster

He was born on April 30, 1855, in Cleveland, Ohio. He was a son of Susan Isidora (née Bestow) Wiborg and Henry Paulinus Wiborg, a Norwegian immigrant.

He attended the Chickering Scientific and Classical Institute, a public high school in Cincinnati, and graduated in 1874. He worked for Levi Ault to pay his way through school.

== Career ==
After graduating, Ault and Wiborg became business partners, founding the Ault & Wiborg printing ink company. By 40, he was a multimillionaire. The firm prospered with the development of colored inks based on coal-dye tars and the introduction of lithography, and expanded until its operations in multiple cities made it the world's largest ink manufacturer of its day.

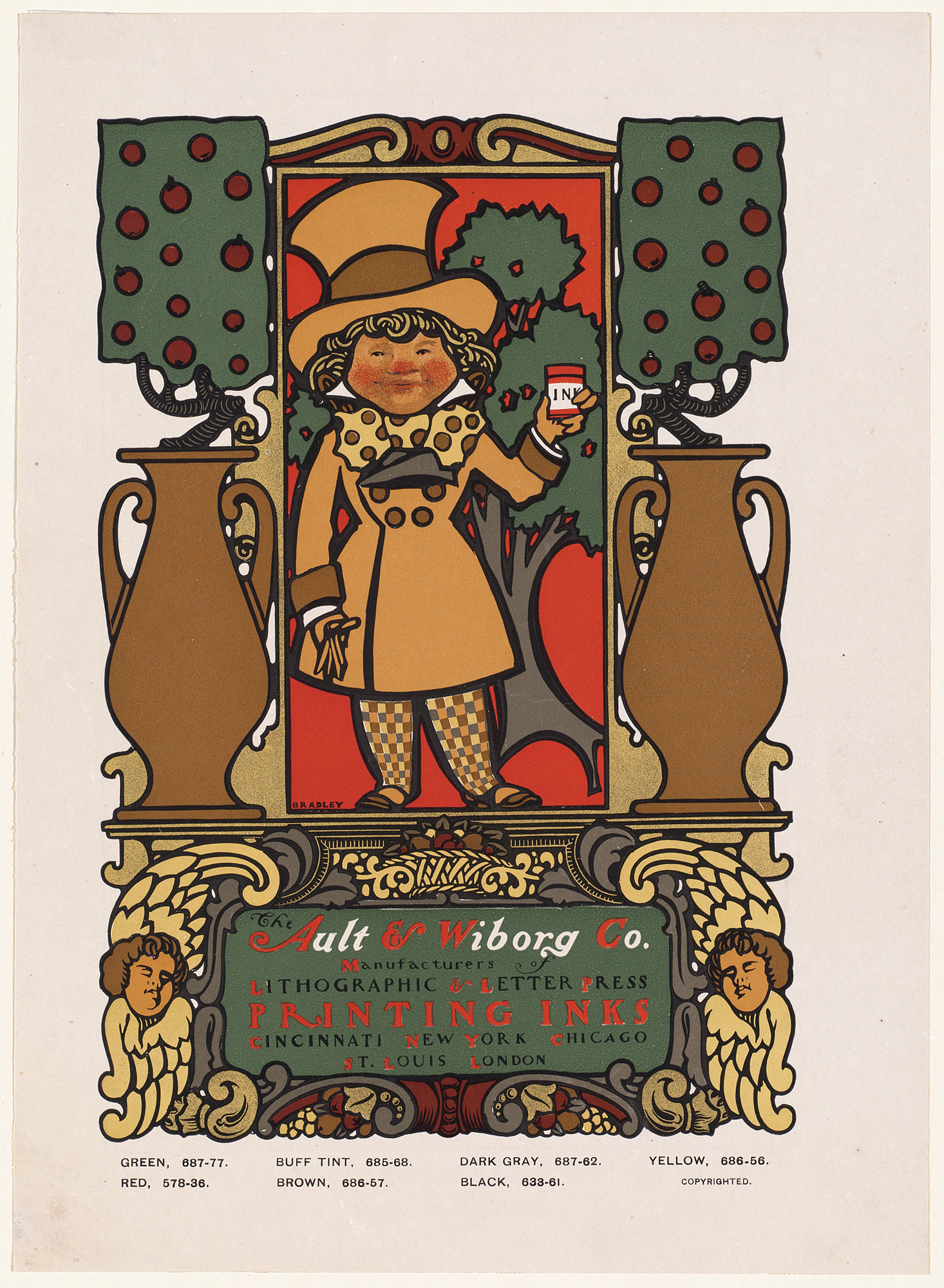
The Ault & Wiborg Company printing ink

Wiborg later became the Assistant Secretary of Commerce and Labor in the Taft administration.

=== Later life ===
Wiborg devoted most of his leisure time in his later years to writing books, including The Travels of an Unofficial Attaché, published in 1904, A Commercial Traveller in South America, published in 1905, and Printing Ink: A History with a Treatise on Modern Methods of Manufacture and Use, published in 1926. Shortly before his death, he was working on a second volume of Printing Ink.

== Personal life ==
In 1882, Wiborg married Adeline Moulton Sherman (1859–1917), the daughter of Sarah Elvira (née Moulton) Sherman and banker Hoyt Sherman and a niece of General William Tecumseh Sherman and Senator John Sherman. Together they had three daughters:

- Sara Sherman Wiborg (1883–1975), who married Gerald Murphy, son of Patrick Francis Murphy (whose family owned the Mark Cross Company), in 1915.
- Mary Hoyt Wiborg (1888–1964), a playwright who wrote the 1922 play Taboo that starred Paul Robeson.
- Olga Wiborg (1890–1937), who married Sidney Webster Fish, a son of Stuyvesant Fish in 1915, in East Hampton.

He died of pneumonia at his home at 756 Park Avenue in New York City on May 12, 1930.

=== East Hampton, New York ===
The Wiborg family spent summer vacations in the Hamptons, renting rooms and cottages in Amagansett and East Hampton Village before purchasing 600 acres just west of the Maidstone Club from Mrs. Marshall Smith in spring 1909. He expanded an existing cottage and eventually, in 1912, built a 30-room stucco mansion, known as The Dunes, that was among the largest in the area.

== Writings ==
- The Travels of an Unofficial Attaché (Privately printed, 1904)
- A Commercial Traveller in South America (New York: McClure, Phillips & Co. 1905)
- Printing Ink: A History with a Treatise on Modern Methods of Manufacture and Use (New York and London: Harper, 1926)
