= Ault & Wiborg Company =

Ink manufacturing company

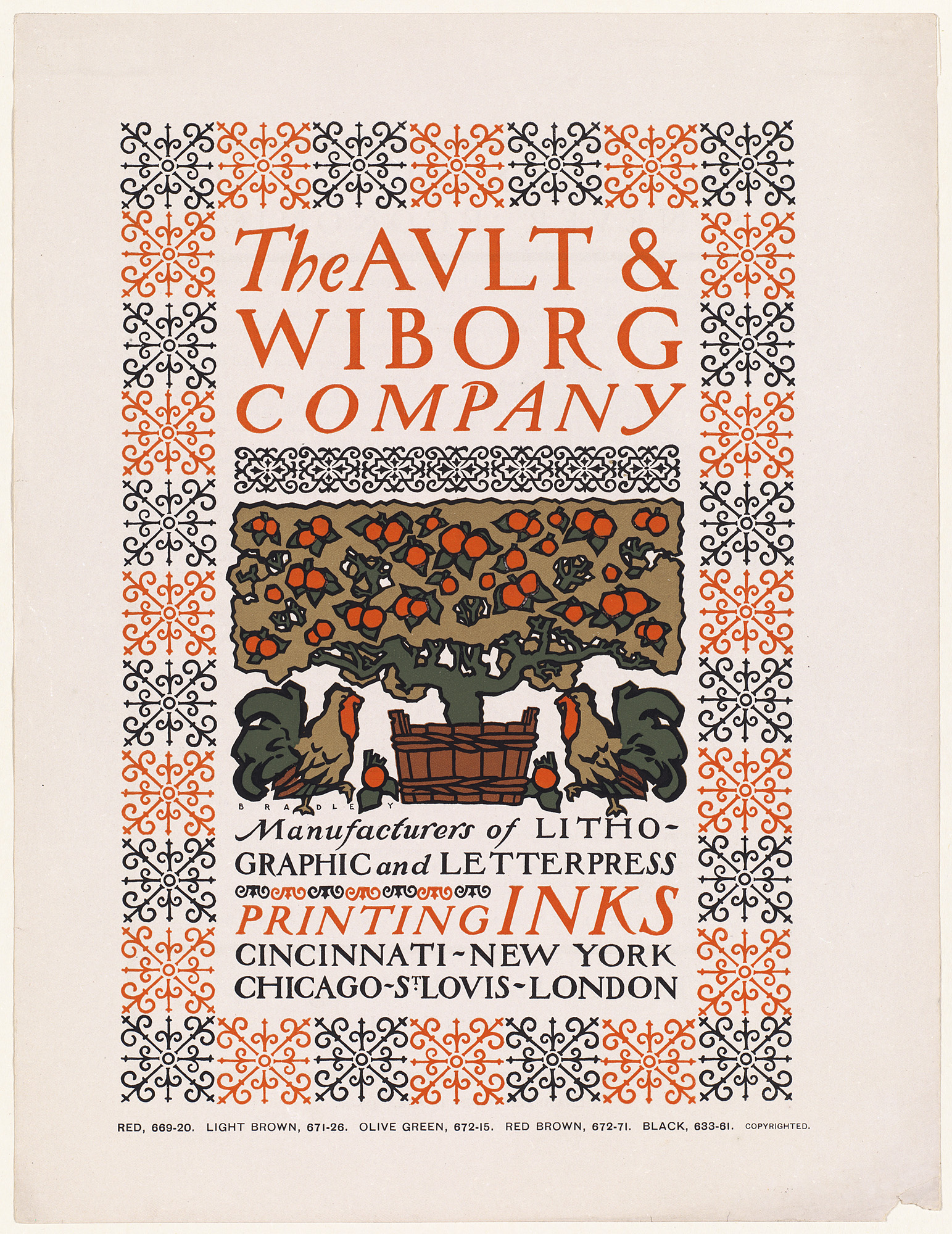
- Advertisement, ca. 1920
- Type: manufacturer
- Founded: 1878; 148 years ago in Cincinnati, United States
- Founders: Levi Addison Ault, Frank Bestow Wiborg
- Defunct: 1928
- Fate: Merger
- Successor: International Printing Ink Corp.
- Products: printing inks

The Ault & Wiborg Company was a manufacturer of printing inks that operated independently from 1878 to 1928. Founded in Cincinnati, Ohio, by Levi Addison Ault and Frank Bestow Wiborg, it expanded until its operations in multiple cities made it the world's largest ink manufacturer of its day.

The firm prospered with the development of colored inks based on coal-dye tars and the introduction of lithography.

As part of its marketing efforts, the company commissioned elaborate posters and magazine advertisements, the latter particularly for The Printing Art and The Inland Printer. Among the artists who produced works for the company were Henri de Toulouse-Lautrec (in 1896; he was also a customer, using the company's inks for his own works), Will H. Bradley (the "dean of American designers", he produced several dozen of the posters from 1895 to about 1900); and Louis Rhead (at least one, in 1896). Many of these designs have been collected by noted institutions, including the National Museum of American History, Library of Congress, the Metropolitan Museum of Art, and more. In 1902, the company published a book reproducing some 100 of these posters.

Ault was still running Ault & Wiborg in 1928 when he sold his interest for $14 million ($262,500,000 today), allowing it to be merged with Queen City Printing Inks and Philip Ruxton Co. to form the International Printing Ink Corp. The successor company, renamed Interchemical Corp. in 1938, was sold in 1968 to the Carrier Corporation and then in 1985 to BASF.
