= Bradley, His Book =

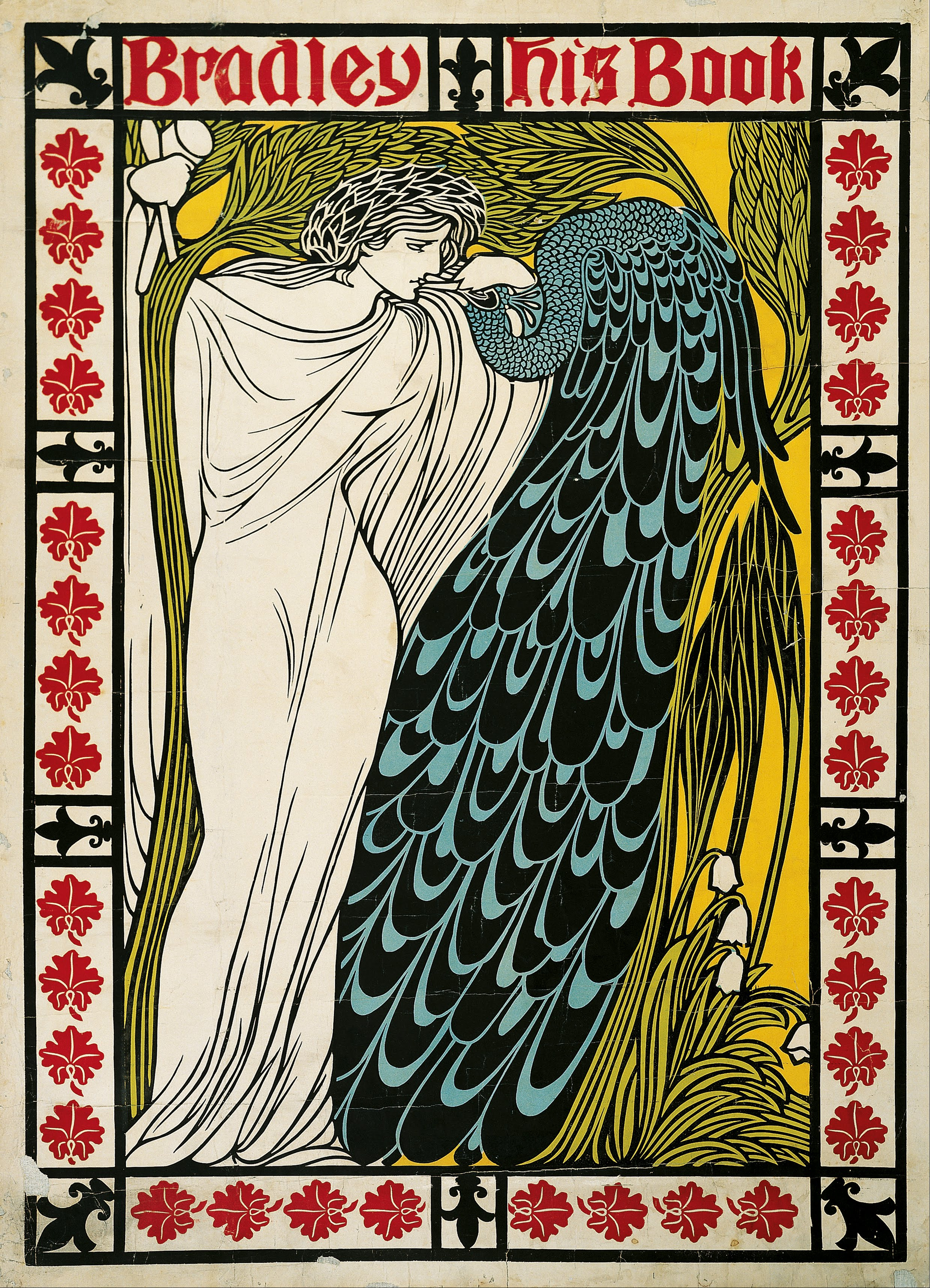
Bradley, His Book

Bradley, His Book (1896–1897) was an American magazine established by Will H. Bradley in Springfield, Massachusetts, in the late 19th century. Contributors included Richard Harding Davis, Nixon Waterman, Julia Draper Whiting, and others. Its visual style was unusually unified throughout the publication; "posters intended as art mingled with advertisements ... for such consumer goods as lawn sprinklers." Among the artists featured in the magazine were William Snelling Hadaway and Maxfield Parrish.

== Images ==
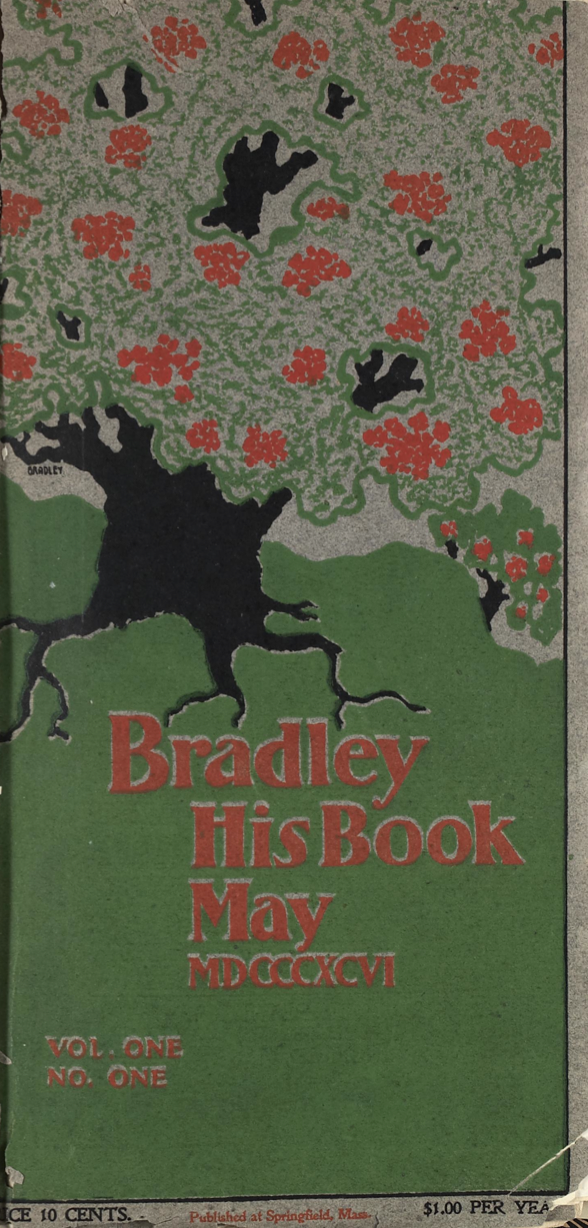
Bradley His Book, v.1, no.1, 1896

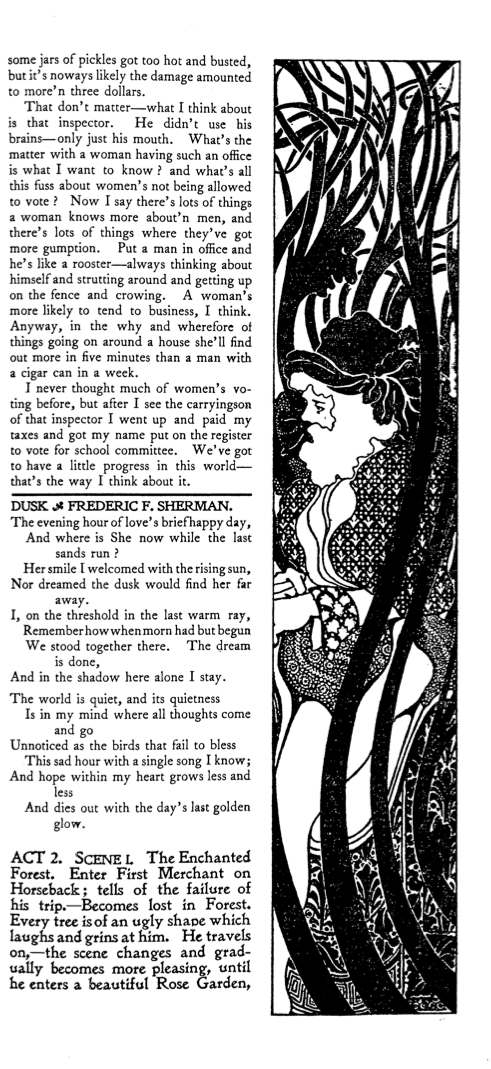
1896

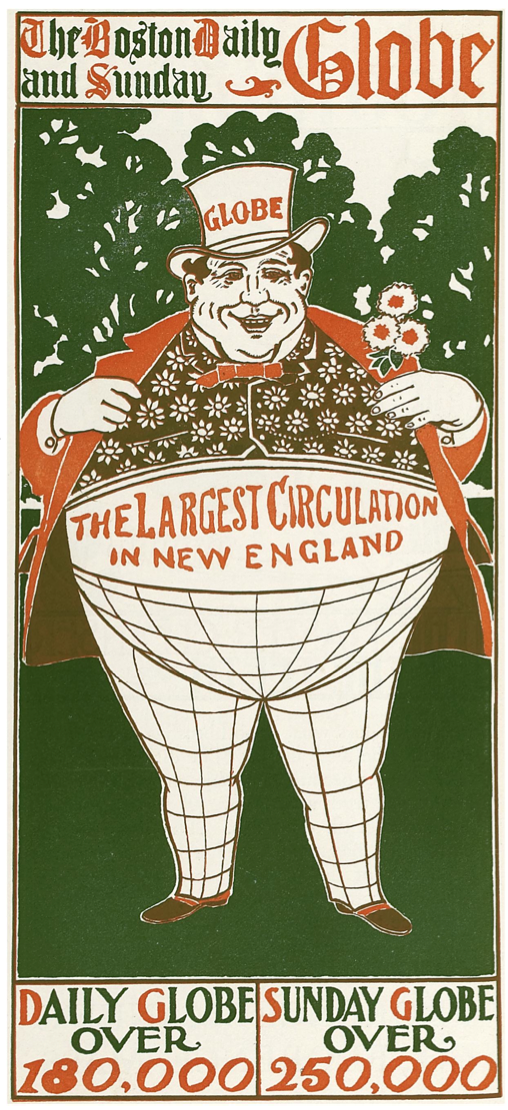
Advertisement for Boston Daily Globe, 1896

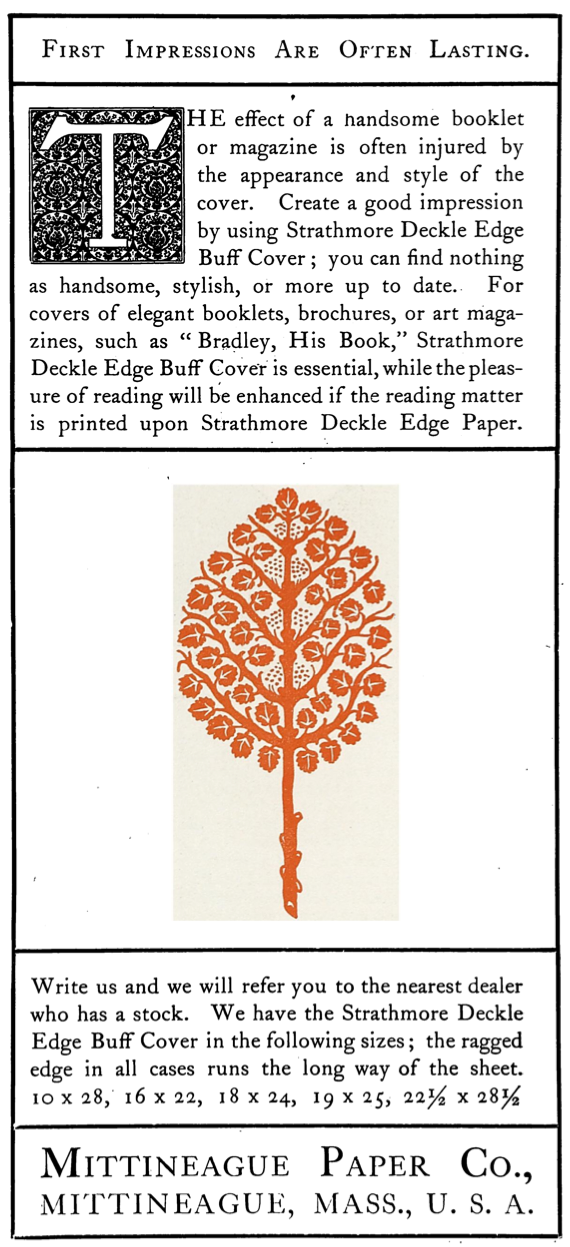
Advertisement for Mittineague Paper Co., Springfield, Mass., 1896

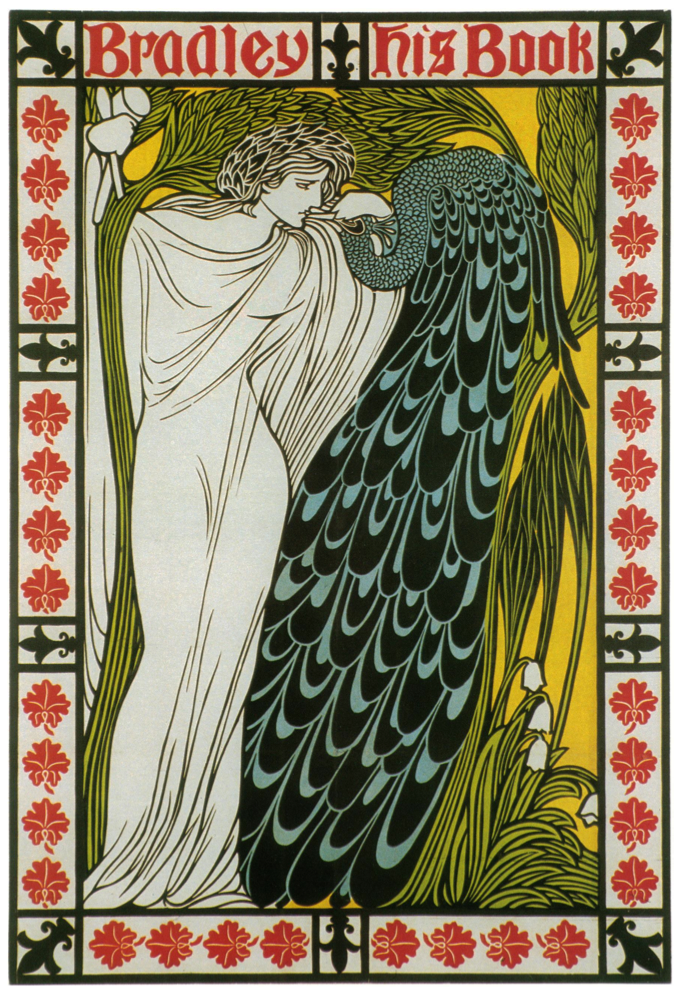
1896
