= Queen City Printing Ink Company =

Ink manufacturing company

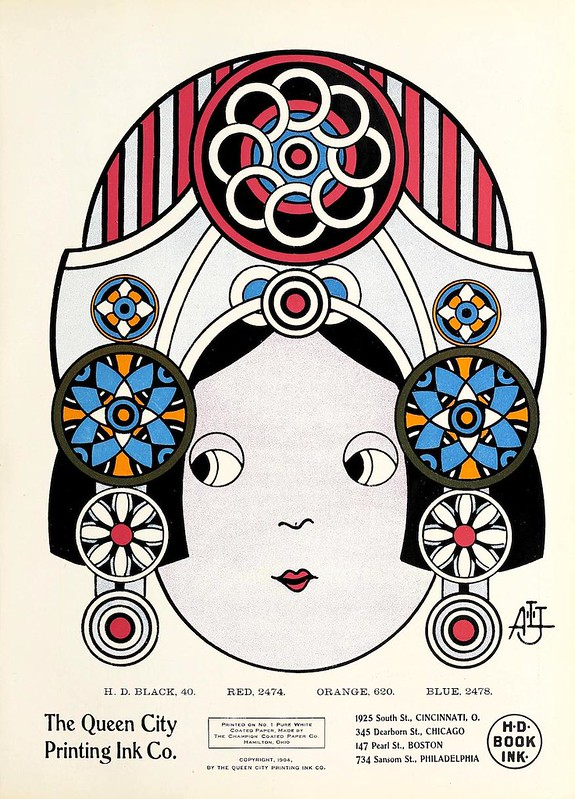
- Advertisement by Augustus L. Jansson
- Company type: manufacturer
- Founded: 1860; 166 years ago in Cincinnati, United States, as DeGolyer & Rychen
- Founders: George H. DeGolyer, John Rychen
- Defunct: 1928
- Fate: Merger
- Successor: International Printing Ink Corp.
- Products: printing inks

The Queen City Printing Ink Company was a major manufacturer of printing inks in Cincinnati, Ohio. Founded in 1860 as DeGolyer & Rychen, it operated independently until a 1928 merger.

The company touted itself as “The Oldest and Largest Printing Ink Works in The West”—the West harking back to the early 19th century, when Ohio was well west of the country's population center. "Whatever of credit or honor may be attached to pioneership, this company is justly entitled to, for its history can be traced back to the earliest attempt to manufacture a really fine printing ink west of the Alleghanies", one author wrote in 1877.

DeGolyer & Rychen invented "Queen City Inks" as a brand, which proved so successful that in 1877, the company incorporated under the name. "The Queen City Printing Ink Company has filed its articles of incorporation. The capital stock is $50,000, divided into ten shares. The incorporators are George H. DeGolyer, John Rychen, Joseph Green, Elisha F. Rychen, and John B. Cheeseman." The company's products included black ink for newsprint, sold in amounts from five to 500 pounds, and finer inks for magazines and smaller jobs in amounts down to one ounce. With factories that could produce three and a half tons of ink a day, the company supplied all of Cincinnati's daily newspapers as well as others in "St. Louis, Chicago, Pittsburgh, Cleveland, Detroit, Nashville, Atlanta, New Orleans, Buffalo, etc." For a time, it provided the ink for The American Israelite.

Occasional fires beset the company. On May 3, 1880, for example, "A slight fire occurred about half-past 8 o'clock this morning in the Queen City Printing Ink Establishment, on Eighth Street, near Evans. An alarm was turned in from Box 238, but the engines were not needed." And on January 28, 1881: "The Queen City Printing Ink Company's establishment on New Court street, between Harriet and McLean avenue, was damaged by fire yesterday morning at half-past nine o'clock to-the extent of about $800." For 1881, the company reported returns of $3,272.

By 1904, the company had branches in Boston, Chicago, Philadelphia, and Toronto.

As part of its marketing efforts, the company commissioned elaborate posters and magazine advertisements, particularly for The Inland Printer. More than a dozen were done from 1903 to 1908 by Augustus L. Jansson (1863–1931), an illustrator known for his work with Wedgwood and the Boston Herald. "The adverts aimed at ink-buyers ran from c. 1903 to 1908. Dubbed ‘Inkydinks’ by The American Printer/The International Printer in April 1906, the bright array of ‘Ink Beasts’ were the apogee of good advertising", Karen Strike wrote in 2019.

In 1928, Queen City merged with two other inkmaking powerhouses—the New York-based Philip Ruxton Co. and fellow Cincinnati firm Ault & Wiborg Company—to form the International Printing Ink Corp., likely the largest ink manufacturer in the world. The merging companies formally dissolved on May 31, 1928. The successor company, renamed Interchemical Corp. in 1938, was sold in 1968 to the Carrier Corporation and then in 1985 to BASF.
