= Mille Roches, Ontario =

Ghost Town in Ontario, Canada

Coordinates: 45.0276°N 74.8312°W

Mille Roches is an underwater ghost town in the Canadian province of Ontario. It is one of Ontario's Lost Villages, which were permanently flooded by the creation of the St. Lawrence Seaway in 1958.

Families and businesses in Mille Roches were moved to the new town of Long Sault before the seaway construction commenced.

Mille Roches was the birthplace of Levi Addison Ault, born into a well-known and established family in the town, who moved to Cincinnati, Ohio as an adult and became a successful businessman and the city's commissioner of parks in the early 1900s. Ault also donated a large parcel of family-owned land on Sheek's Island, which became Ault Park.

== Ethnic history of Mille Roches and the region ==
Eastern Ontario was always a highway or corridor through which people moved, a corridor used by migration and conquest. Prior to European colonization, the Mohawks and Six Nations Iroquois settled and raided through the St. Lawrence valley. The French and British fought over the waterway, and after the American revolution, in 1812–14, it became a battleground between Americans and Canadians. At various times, much like the rest of Eastern Ontario, it also became a home for migrants looking to escape authorities or find safe haven from overseas conflicts.

Early settlement is largely undocumented, though oral histories and early accounts suggest that settlers, traders and farmers lived in the area long before formal recognition.

When the local population emerged into registered and recorded history, the regional population was already a mixture of French Canadian, Ojibwe and Mohawk residents; to this was added an influx of American English loyalists and refugees from the Thirteen Colonies (now the United States), French Canadian and Acadian migrants, and, later, Scottish and Irish immigrants and refugees. These different groups mixed and integrated over time, with family names and histories reflecting a blending of different backgrounds that was generally typical of Eastern Ontario, especially the "United Counties" of Stormont, Dundas and Glengarry, but also true of the general area of Loyalist settlement east of Kingston.

Smaller but noted contributions in the region were made by others, from Jewish traders, of Sephardic Spanish origin, craftsmen and merchants to former slaves. John Baker, for example, who died in 1871 at the age of 93, was said to be the last Canadian born into slavery. Slavery was ended in the colony of Upper Canada in stages, beginning in 1793 when importing slaves was banned and culminating in 1819, when Upper Canada Attorney-General John Robinson declared any slaves living in Canada were now free. Most of these former slaves settled and integrated into the communities where they were freed. By 1833, all slaves in British North America and the Empire were free, the first major power in world history to abolish slavery. This affected even the village of Milles roches, as a place where former slaves settled.

The aftermath of the American Revolution resulted in the formal division of Upper and Lower Canada (later, Ontario and Quebec) to accommodate loyalists fleeing persecution in the new United States. Distribution of land throughout Southern Ontario brought major change to Eastern Ontario. Cornwall (and the surrounding area), originally called "Royal Township #2" and "Johnstown", was a rough place, and bred a local culture of self-reliance. Mille Roches' settlers and residents were more effectively integrated into the increasingly tight-knit region after the Loyalist arrival, with Cornwall as its economic centre.

== Integration and community ==
Mille Roches, like many of the local communities, was unusual in Canada at the time for being quite socially integrated. Characterized by a mix of economic migrants, refugees and opportunists, the local population was a blend of different social classes and ethnic backgrounds. The interdependence demanded by isolation and the lack of either support or interference from authorities meant that villagers in the region were obliged to rely on each other for support.

The original native population was remarkably welcoming, and the Iroquois were especially known for integrating newcomers and adapting to change. Many people in the region have some native ancestry as a result, and family bonds have long linked the formal reservations and the surrounding area.

== Growth and development ==
Among many other sites, Mille Roches was originally an obstacle for water navigation up the St. Lawrence river. Rapids prevented the deep-bottomed hulls of ocean-going ships from moving inland into the Great Lakes basin. Boats would have to unload, their contents carted and carried overland, and then be re-loaded. Calls for building a canal at this spot on the river came very early.

The area immediately around Mille Roches had been used as a source of attractive, highly prized and sought-after black stone for a long period before being formally settled by Europeans. North of the townsite were limestone quarries, which had already been in use by suppliers in Montreal, and the name of the town in French refers to either the large numbers of rocky formations in the area or the rapids which prevented river navigation.

With resource development, mall farmsteads started appearing early in the history of European settlement in Ontario as migrants filtered into the region, and much of this settlement is undocumented.

From 1780 to 1830, after formal recognition resulting from Loyalist settlement, development was slow but steady and a substantial village emerged. Growth was spurred by the use of water power and spawned the development of a large number of mills. Combined with the valuable local stone deposits, the result was a mini-boom in grain milling, stone cutting and milling, and textile operations, and other businesses that could benefit from water power. In August, 1835, its people were rewarded with their own post office.

The Cornwall Canal was built in 1834, to facilitate travel to the upper St Lawrence basin and the Great Lakes. Unfortunately, the canal cut the town off from the mainland, creating an island in the middle of the river. Over time, the village expanded to the north, eventually forming one town that was split in the middle into "old" Mille Roches on one side of the canal and "new" Mille Roches on the mainland to the north. The canal's course caused the decline of the village and the area only improved with the arrival of railways in the 1850s.

The Ault family was an example of the burgeoning prosperity of the area. They ran textile mills. It was this family into which Levi Addison Ault was born. Mille Roches was also known for niche businesses, including the very respected Brooks Furniture Company, as well as a range of talented craftspeople in many industries.

Canal and lock construction in the late 1800s and early 1900s brought work, large boats and electric power generation stations. Railway connections provided much-needed connections to other local communities for public services, such as high schools, which were located largely in Cornwall.

== Independence and enterprise ==
As it was a transit corridor linking greater economic powers, Eastern Ontario has long been a region known for independence and enterprise. One inevitable aspect of being a major trade route and border zone is smuggling. This has a remarkably long tradition, but formal recognition and notoriety increased in the 1920s, during the Prohibition period in US history. Smuggling remains a major local concern, even today. Current plans in Cornwall and the area call for dismantling its reputation as "smugglers' alley".

This history of independence is partly the result of isolation and self-reliance. Governments have typically neglected the area, treating it as little more than a transit corridor. This began very early, even in the 1830s, and prior to this the Loyalist settlers had themselves been forced to be more or less completely self-reliant.

"The original 516 settlers arrived in Royal Township #2 with minimal supplies and faced years of hard work and possible starvation. Upon their departure from military camps in Montreal, Pointe Claire, Saint Anne, and Lachine in the fall of 1784, loyalists were given a tent, one month’s worth of food rations, clothes, and agricultural provisions by regiment commanders. They were promised one cow for every two families, an ax, and other necessary tools in the near future. For the next three years, bateaux crews delivered rations to the township, after which residents were left to fend for themselves."

In a foreshadowing of what was to come over a century later, in 1834, after the building of the first canal, "Old Mille Roches" had been cut off from the mainland. A delegation of townspeople eventually forced the government to provide compensation, after significant pressure, but this was insufficient to fully redress the damage that had been done. By the 1850s, the town had recovered and the entire region was developing, but an ominous precedent had been set.

== Inundation and obliteration ==
By the 1910s, Mille Roches was a prosperous, well-to-do town with a diverse economy and a growing population, linked into a broad social and commercial network of villages and towns throughout Eastern Ontario.

Starting in the 1920s, plans began for damming the St. Lawrence to build a massive hydro-electric power plant and an artificial body of water that was navigable for ocean-going ships. This would bury much of the local landscape under an artificial lake. As negotiations between governments continued for two decades and more, local land values plummeted as a result of the project's apparent inevitability. By "Inundation Day", on July 1, 1958, which was also the Dominion Day (Canada Day) holiday, many landowners complained that market value compensation was insufficient, since the Seaway plan had already depressed property values in the region. These complaints were never addressed, a sad parallel to the poor treatment the locals had been given more than a century earlier.

Many of the houses were moved to one of the new villages constructed along the new rivershore. Long Sault, named in memory of the former rapids, still maintains many of the homes from Mille Roches that were moved to new sites in the town, as well as a museum devoted to the history of The Lost Villages.

Under water, divers have explored what remains of the old power generation plant and the paper mill, but while the foundations remain, most of the buildings were removed or demolished.

Today, nothing of the village remains above water. A beach in on the Long Sault Parkway park, based on a chain of islands, is named after the village. From these former highlands, the view overlooks a broad bay, on the far end of which is the site of the village, now lost under Lake St. Lawrence.
