= Ndau language =

Shona dialect of central Mozambique and Zimbabwe

Ndau
- Region: Mozambique, Zimbabwe, South Africa
- Native speakers: (2.4 million cited 2000–2006)
- Language family: Niger–Congo?: Atlantic–Congo; Benue–Congo; Southern Bantoid; Bantu; Shona (S.10); Ndau

Language codes
- ISO 639-3: ndc
- Glottolog: ndau1241
- Guthrie code: S.15

Ndau (also called chiNdau, Chindau, Ndzawu, Njao, Chidanda) is a Bantu language spoken by 2,400,000 people.

Ndau is a Bantu language and it is mutually intelligible with other languages such as Manyika, Zezuru and Karanga. The 2013 Constitution of Zimbabwe accorded Ndau's status as an official language.

It is a national language of Zimbabwe.

== Sample text ==
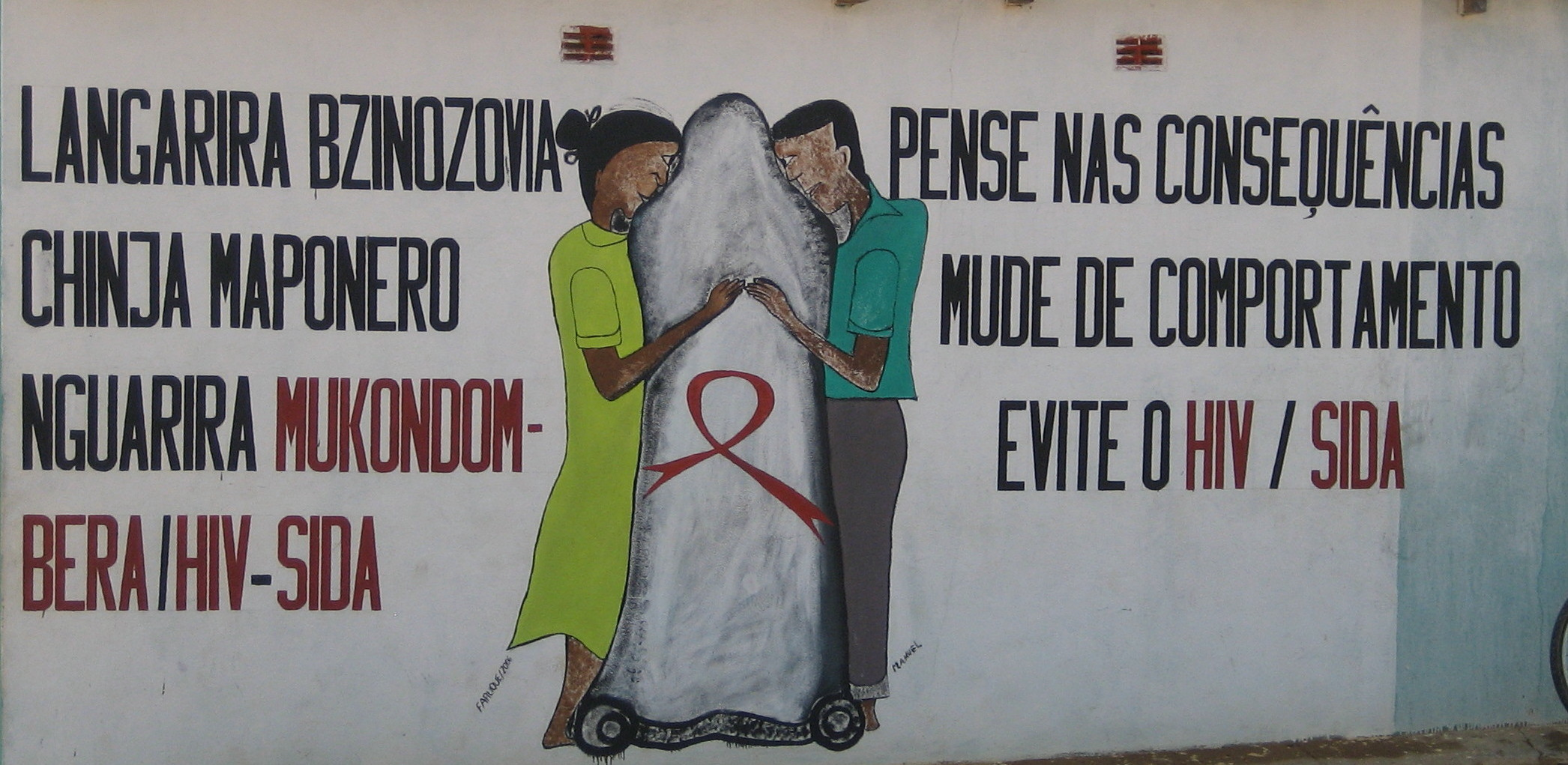
AIDS awareness street art in Machaze district, promoting condom use. The text reads in Portuguese: "think of the consequences, change behaviour, prevent HIV/ADS". To the left, the same text in the Ndau language.

The mutual intelligibility of Ndau with other Shona varieties is fairly high, but some speakers of other Shona varieties may find it difficult to understand. Differences and similarities can be measured by examining a Ndau version of Lord's Prayer:

Baba edu ari mudenga, ngariremeredzwe zina renyu. UMambo hwenyu ngahuuye. Kuda kwenyu ngakuitwa munyika kudai ngomudenga. Tipei nege kurya kwedu kwatinotama nyamashi. Tirekererei ndaa dzedu kudai tisu takarekerera avo vane ndaa kwetiri. Usatipinza mukuedzwa, asi tinunure kuno uwo wakashata.

The equivalent paragraph in Standard Shona (mainly based on Zezuru) is:

Baba vedu vari kudenga, zita renyu ngarikudzwe. UMambo hwenyu ngahwuuye. Kuda kwenyu ngakuitwe pasi sokudenga. Tipei nhasi kudya kwedu kwakwezuva. Tiregererei zvatinokutadzirai sekuregerera kwatinoita vakatitadzira. Musatipinze mukuedzwa, asi mutinunure mune zvakaipa.

== Phonology ==
=== Consonants ===
		Labial		Alveolar				Lateral		Post- alveolar		Velar		Glottal	
		plain	lab.	plain	wstd.	lab.	pal.	plain	lab.	plain	lab.	plain	lab.	plain	lab.
Plosive	voiceless	p	pʷ	t		tʷ	tʲ					k	kʷ		
Plosive	voiced	b	bʷ	d		dʷ	dʲ					ɡ	ɡʷ		
Plosive	aspirated	pʰ	pʷʰ	tʰ		tʷʰ	tʲʰ					kʰ	kʷʰ		
Plosive	implosive	ɓ	ɓʷ	ɗ		ɗʷ	ɗʲ					(ɠ)			
Plosive	ejective	pʼ		tʼ								kʼ			
Plosive	prenasal vl.	ᵐp		ⁿt		ⁿtʷ						ᵑk			
Plosive	prenasal asp.	ᵐpʰ		ⁿtʰ								ᵑkʰ			
Plosive	prenasal vd.	ᵐb	ᵐbʷ	ⁿd		ⁿdʷ	ⁿdʲ					ᵑɡ	ᵑɡʷ		
Affricate	voiceless	p͡f		t͡s	t͡sᶲ	t͡sʷ				t͡ʃ	t͡ʃʷ				
Affricate	voiced	b͡v		d͡z	d͡zᵝ	d͡zʷ				d͡ʒ	d͡ʒʷ				
Affricate	aspirated	p͡fʰ		t͡sʰ	t͡sᶲʰ	t͡sʷʰ				t͡ʃʰ	t͡ʃʷʰ				
Affricate	ejective	p͡fʼ		t͡sʼ	t͡sᶲʼ					t͡ʃʼ					
Affricate	prenasal	ᵐb͡v		ⁿd͡z	ⁿd͡zᵝ	ⁿd͡zʷ				ᶮd͡ʒ	ᶮd͡ʒʷ				
Fricative	voiceless	f	fʷ	s	sᶲ	sʷ		ɬ	ɬʷ	ʃ	ʃʷ			h	hʷ
Fricative	voiced	v	vʷ	z	zᵝ	zʷ		ɮ	ɮʷ	ʒ	ʒʷ				
Fricative	prenasal	ᶬv		ⁿz	ⁿzᵝ	ⁿzʷ		ⁿɮ		ᶮʒ	ᶮʒʷ				
Nasal	voiced	m	mʷ	n		nʷ				ɲ	ɲʷ	ŋ	ŋʷ		
Nasal	breathy	mʱ	mʷʱ	nʱ		nʷʱ									
Trill				r		rʷ	rʲ								
Approximant		β̞	β̞ʷ					l		j			w		

- Other labialized sounds are labialized-whistled sounds as /sᶲʷ, zᵝʷ/.
- Other palatalized sounds are labialized-palatalized ones as /tʲʷ, rʲʷ/.
- Other affricate sounds are /p͡sᶲ, b͡zᵝ/.
- /h, hʷ/ may also range to voiced [ɦ, ɦʷ] within dialectal areas.
- /β̞, β̞ʷ/ may also range to labio-dental [ʋ, ʋʷ] in free variation.
- The velar implosive /ɠ/ only appears in a few words.
- /r/ when occurring before vowels /i, e/, can be heard as a lateral flap [ɺ].
- Sibilant sounds /d͡z, s/ may have aspirated allophones as [d͡zʱ, sʰ].
- Prenasal aspirated sounds /ᵐpʰ, ⁿtʰ, ᵑkʰ/ can have allophones as prenasal-devoiced plosives [ᵐb̥ʰ, ⁿd̥ʰ, ᵑɡ̊ʰ].

Click consonants
		Dental	Post- alveolar	Lateral
Voiceless	plain	ᵏǀ	ᵏǃ	ᵏǁ
Voiceless	aspirated		ᵏǃʰ	ᵏǁʰ
Voiceless	nasalized	ᵑǀ	ᵑǃ	ᵑǁ
Voiced	plain	ᶢǀ	ᶢǃ	ᶢǁ
Voiced	nasalized		ᵑǃᶢ	

=== Vowels ===
	Front	Central	Back
Close	i		u
Mid	e		o
Open		a	

== Alphabet ==
While the mainstream Shona language excludes L, Q and X from its alphabet, Ndau orthography uses them as shown by the examples below:

1. Mainstream Shona "Akatizira and the Ndau version Akafohla: 'L' is used in the digraph hl for the sound [ɬ].
2. Mainstream Shona "kuridza tsamwa and the Ndau version kuxapa: 'X' is used for the click consonant [ᵏǁ].
3. Mainstream Shona "Kurara and the Ndau version Kuqambaya: 'Q' is used for the click consonant [ᵏǃ].

These sounds have been acquired from neighboring Nguni languages.

== Proverbs, fables, and songs ==
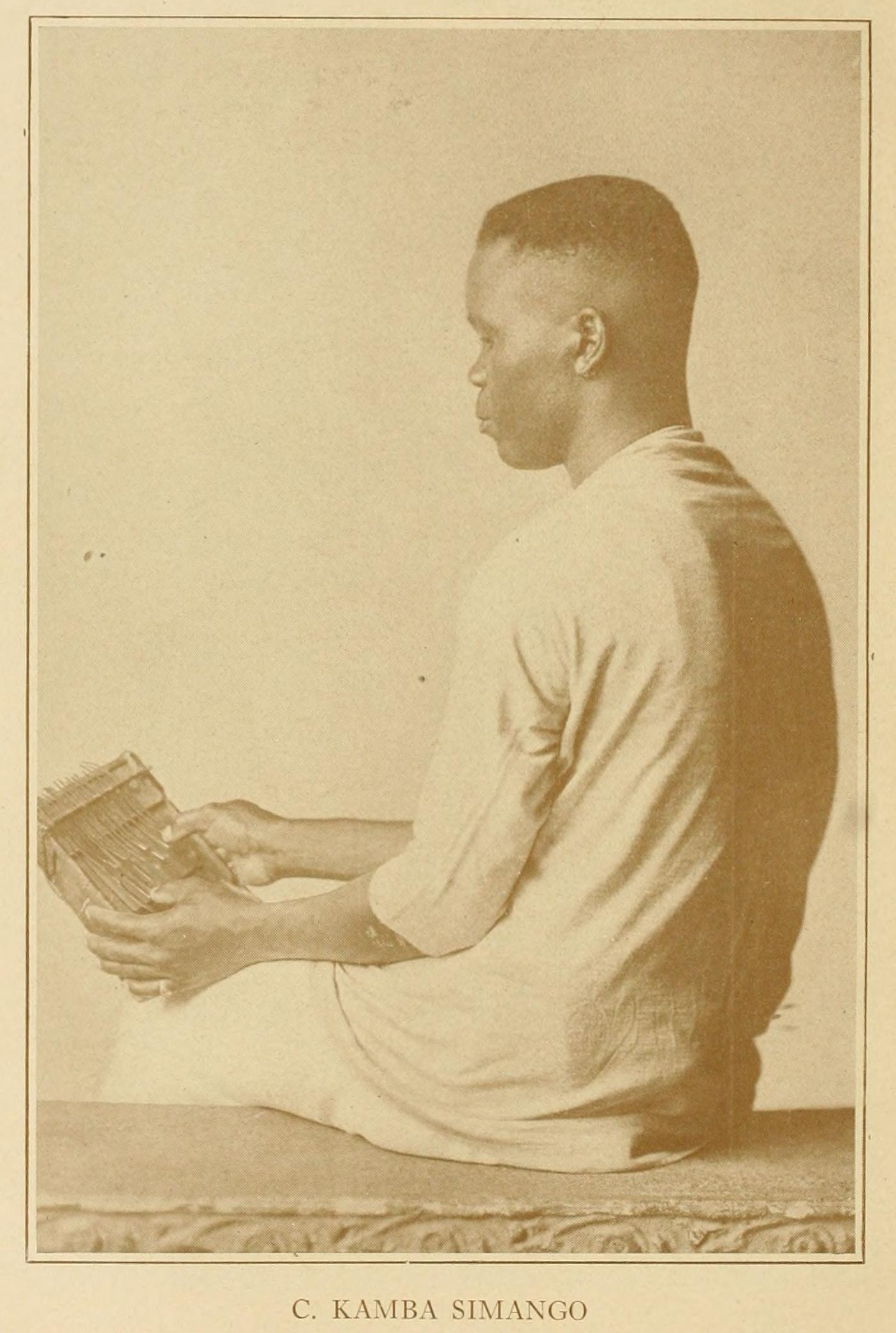
C. Kamba Simango with a kalimba (mbira)

In 1922, C. Kamba Simango, a Vandau ethnographer, working together with Franz Boas, published a collection of 20 Ndau fables and 29 Ndau proverbs, accompanied by an English translation, in the Journal of American Folklore. The following are some of the proverbs:

- "Simba lo ngwena lili mumfula." ("The strength of the crocodile is in the water.") (#1)
- "Chipanga achizivi vatendji." ("The knife does not know its owner; i.e. it cuts everyone, even its owner.") (#8)
- "Hove djinotevela mulambo wadjo." ("Fish follow their river; i.e. people will support their own family or tribe.") (#24)
- "Manthede a·novengana pakurga, napamfumfu anobesana." ("Baboons quarrel over food, but in danger help one another.") (#28)

Simango also provided the Ndau texts and translations that appear in Songs and Tales from the Dark Continent by Natalie Curtis Burlin, published in 1920. The book contains 6 proverbs in Ndau and English with commentary along with songs that include the Ndau lyrics, English translation, plus a transcription of the music. There are ritual songs, including Mate'ka, "Song of the Rain Ceremony;" Manthi'ki, "Spirit Song;" Lum'bo Lgo Lu'do, "Love-Song;" and Mafu've, "Dance of Girls," along with a selection of "Children's Songs," "Laboring Songs," and "Dance Songs," plus Kufa'mba, a mocking song and Chili'lo, a lament. There are also 2 songs in Ndau and in English included in the folktale, "How the Animals Dug Their Well," plus a song that is part of the "Legend of the Daughter and the Slave" and a song that is part of the "Legend of the Sky-Maiden." In an appendix, there is an interlinear word-for-word rendering of the Ndau proverbs and song lyrics into English.
