= Mary Hoyt Wiborg =

American dramatist

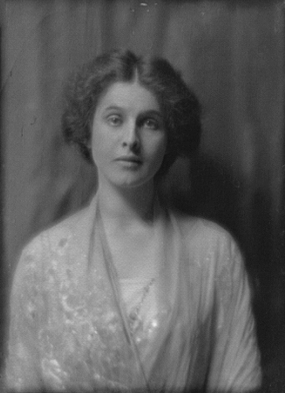
Mary Hoyt Wiborg

Mary Hoyt Wiborg (January 28, 1888 – March 27, 1964) was an American playwright, art patron, and socialite. She wrote the 1922 play Taboo that starred Paul Robeson.

Wiborg was born in Cincinnati to businessman Frank Bestow Wiborg. Her mother was a daughter of financier Hoyt Sherman, and a niece of General William Tecumseh Sherman and Senator John Sherman. She had two sisters, Olga Wiborg and Sara Sherman Wiborg.

Wiborg lived in Paris, France, and according to her obituary in The New York Times was active in the Red Cross. During World War I, she was one of a skeleton staff at the Hospice de St. Vincent de Paul in Montmirail, France, who cared for wounded from the June 1918 Chateau-Thierry campaign; as hospital founder Harriet Bard Squiers wrote, "The hospital was a slaughterhouse ... Hoytie W[i]borg did such splendid work. She never had her clothes off for nights....I can't begin to tell you how wonderful she has been." During World War II, she served in the French Resistance. She was a Chevalier of the French Legion of Honor.
