= Levi Addison Ault =

Canadian-born businessman (1851–1930)

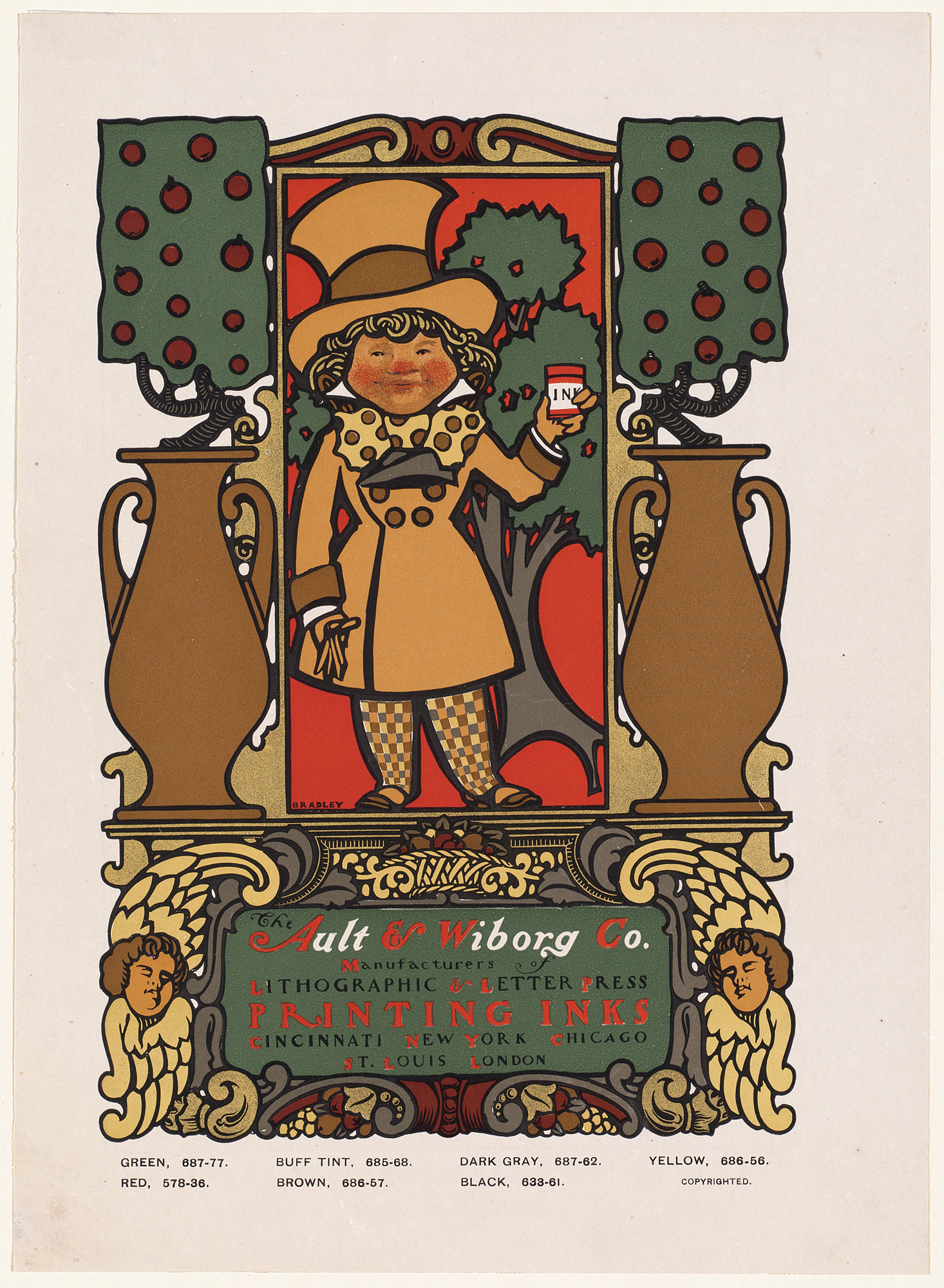
The Ault & Wiborg Company printing inks advertisement

Levi Addison Ault (November 1851 – February 1930) was a Canadian-born American businessman and bureaucrat whose career was closely associated with the city of Cincinnati, Ohio, where he earned the nickname "Father of Cincinnati's Parks".

== Biography ==
Born in Mille Roches, Province of Canada, to a successful fabric manufacturer, Ault moved to Wisconsin in his teens, where he worked as a bookkeeper. In 1876, he moved to Cincinnati and took a job as a lampblack salesman.

Two years later, Ault and his business partner Frank Wiborg incorporated Ault & Wiborg, an ink manufacturer that became the world's top producer and supplier of inks and lithograph supplies. In 1928, Ault sold his share in the company for $14 million ($262,500,000 today) .

In the mid-1920s, Ault was offered an ambassadorship by U.S. President Warren G. Harding, but he declined.

Ault was also an avid naturalist, whose passion for parks led him to join Cincinnati's parks board. He served as chair of the board from 1908 to 1926, and donated 204 acres (825,000 m^{2}) of land to the city to create Ault Park. Twenty acres (21,000 m^{2}) not donated by Ault himself were later added to this park as well.

He also donated a family property on Sheek's Island to the township of Cornwall, which also became known as Ault Park.

In 1958, 28 years after Ault's death, Sheek's Island and Ault's birthplace in Mille Roches were submerged by construction on the St. Lawrence Seaway project. With the help of Ault's surviving family, Ault Park was rebuilt on the new river shoreline near Long Sault, and is home to a historical museum commemorating The Lost Villages.
