= Will H. Bradley =

American artist (1868–1962)

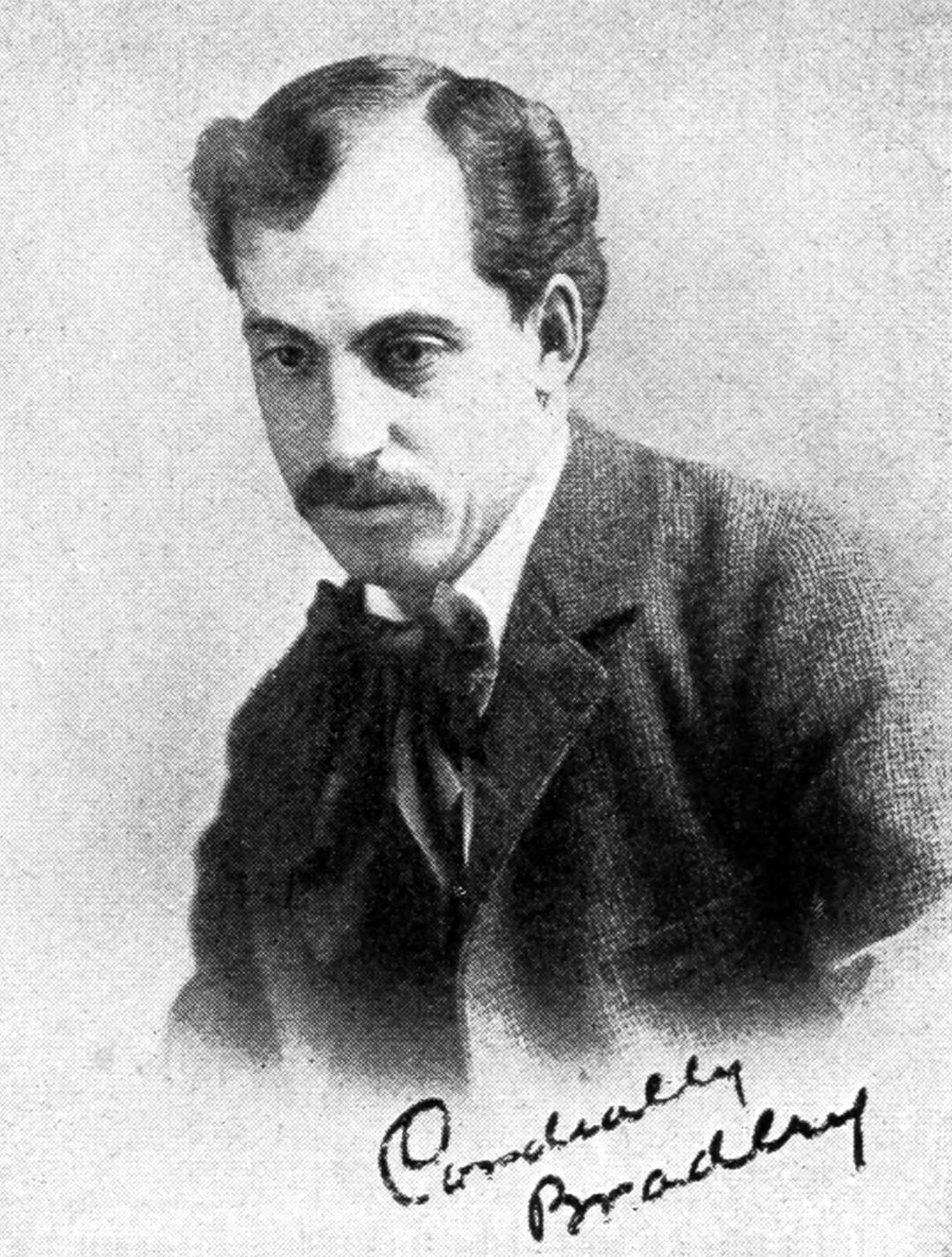
- Will H. Bradley (1896)
- Born: William Henry Bradley; July 10, 1868; Boston, Massachusetts, U.S.
- Died: January 25, 1962 (aged 93); La Mesa, California, U.S.
- Known for: Illustration, graphic design, typography, printing, writing, film
- Movement: Art Nouveau

William Henry Bradley (July 10, 1868 – January 25, 1962) was an American Art Nouveau illustrator, artist and film director. Nicknamed the "Dean of American Designers" by The Saturday Evening Post, he was the highest-paid American artist of the early 20th century.

== Biography ==
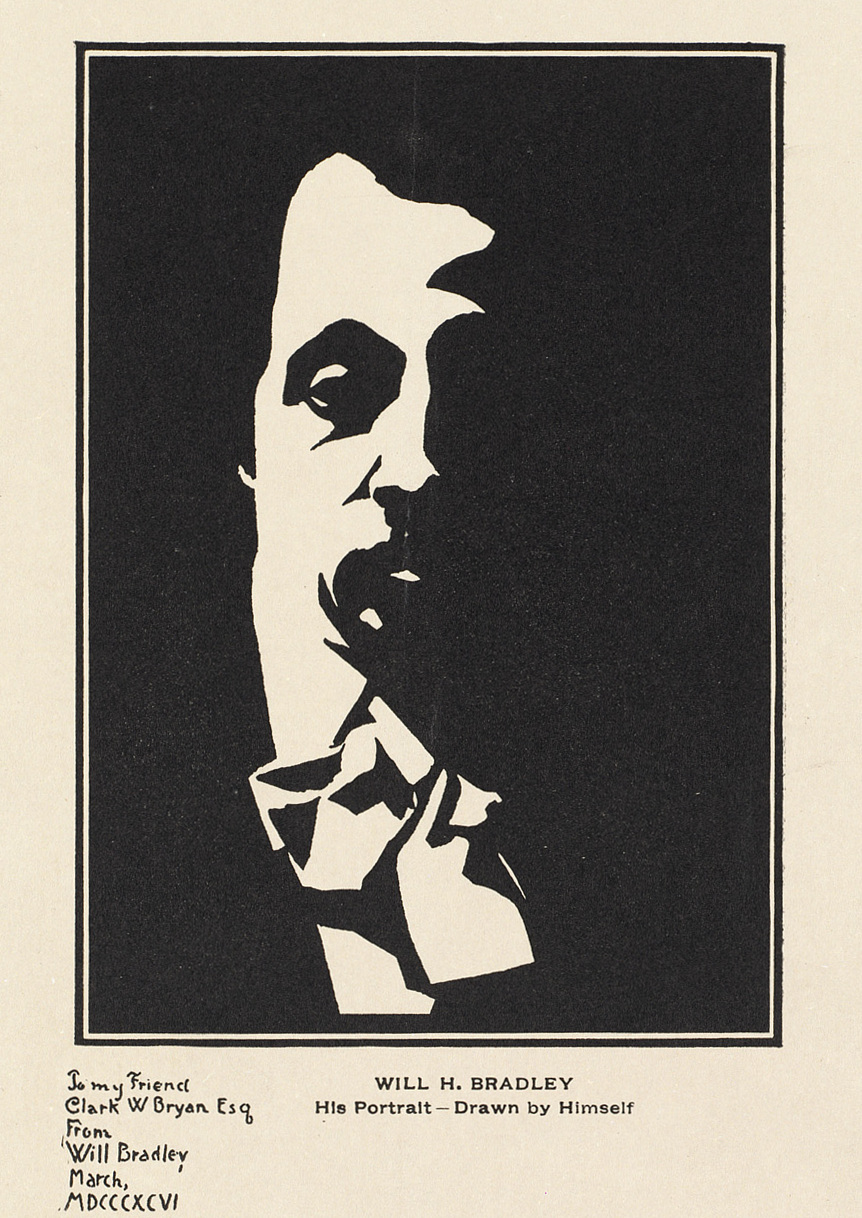
Will H. Bradley. His portrait - drawn by himself in 1896

Bradley was born July 10, 1868, in Boston, Massachusetts, to Aaron Bradley and Sarah Rowland. At the age of 12 he obtained a job as an apprentice for a weekly newspaper — the Iron Agitator, later known as the Iron Ore — in Ishpeming, Michigan. He had moved there with his mother to be with family after the death of his father. He left at 17 for Chicago, Illinois, where he held a few brief jobs as a wood engraver and typographer before dedicating himself to freelance graphic design. He moved back to Massachusetts and set up the Wayside Press, where he served as an illustrator, editor, typographer, designer, and press manager for a magazine he named Bradley, His Book. The periodical usually contained compilations of poetry, stories, and sketches, and his work received a warm reception. He had achieved financial success, but the stress of managing so many projects at once began to damage his health, and he collapsed at the age of 28. He recovered quickly, but he was forced to sell the Wayside Press.

From 1895 to about 1900, Bradley produced some of the elaborate posters and full-page magazine advertisements commissioned by ink manufacturer Ault & Wiborg; his designs have been collected by noted institutions, including Library of Congress and the University of Delaware.

He later worked as a consultant for the American Type Founders and as an editor for Collier's Weekly. He worked briefly with children's books, then for William Randolph Hearst's film division as a supervising art director and assistant director on the Wharton Brothers' serial films Beatrice Fairfax (1916) and Patria (1917).

Bradley founded his own production company, Dramafilms, and went on to write, produce and direct his own films, including Bitter Fruit (1920), Moongold (1920) and The Tame Cat (1921). In 1954, The Typophiles published a memoir of Bradley's life called Will Bradley: His Chap Book, a limited edition of 650 copies. The same year, he won the AIGA medal, the highest honor for graphic designers. He was a prolific artist and designer up until his death at age 93.

== Artistic style ==
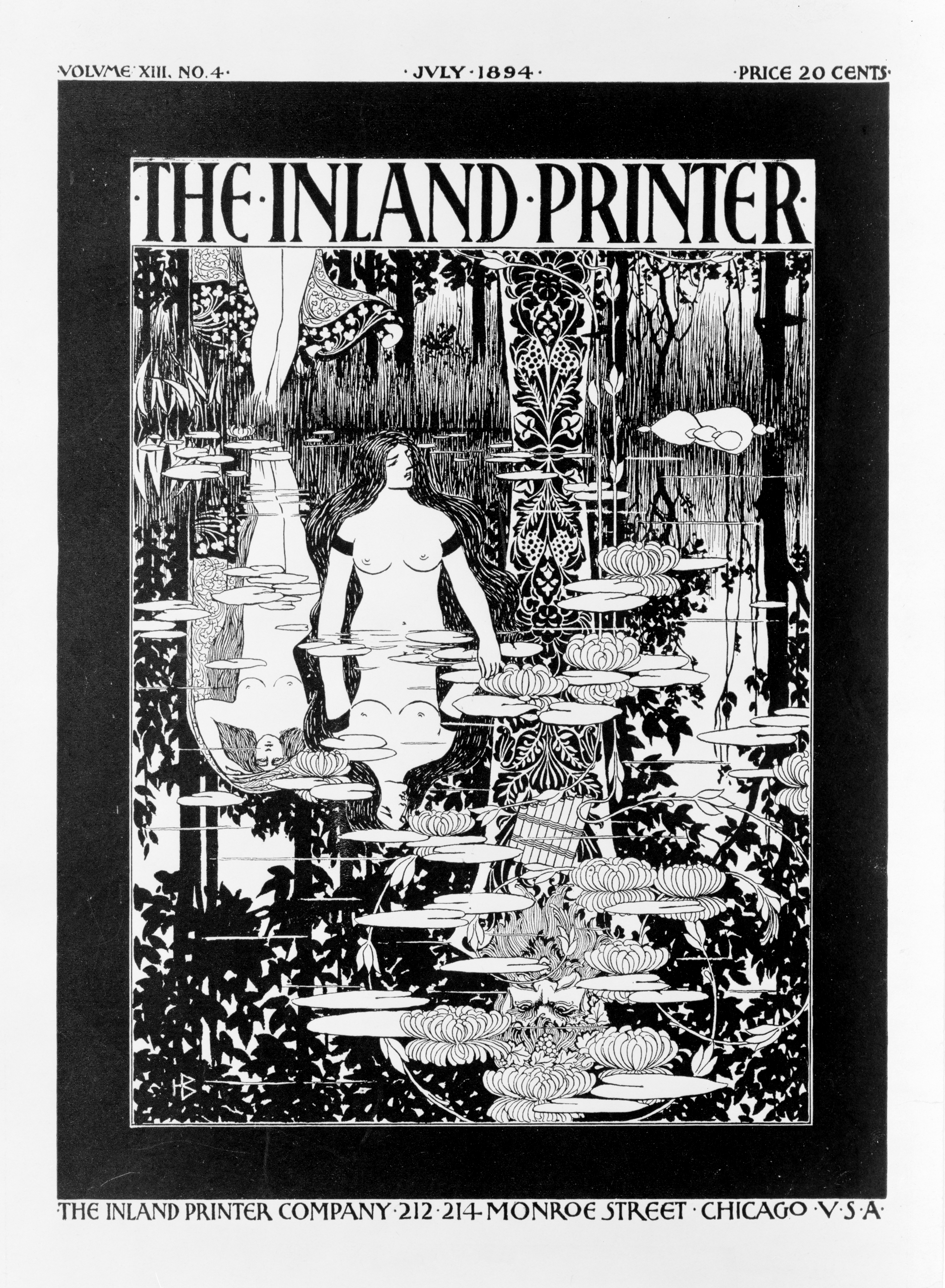
Cover for The Inland Printer (1894)

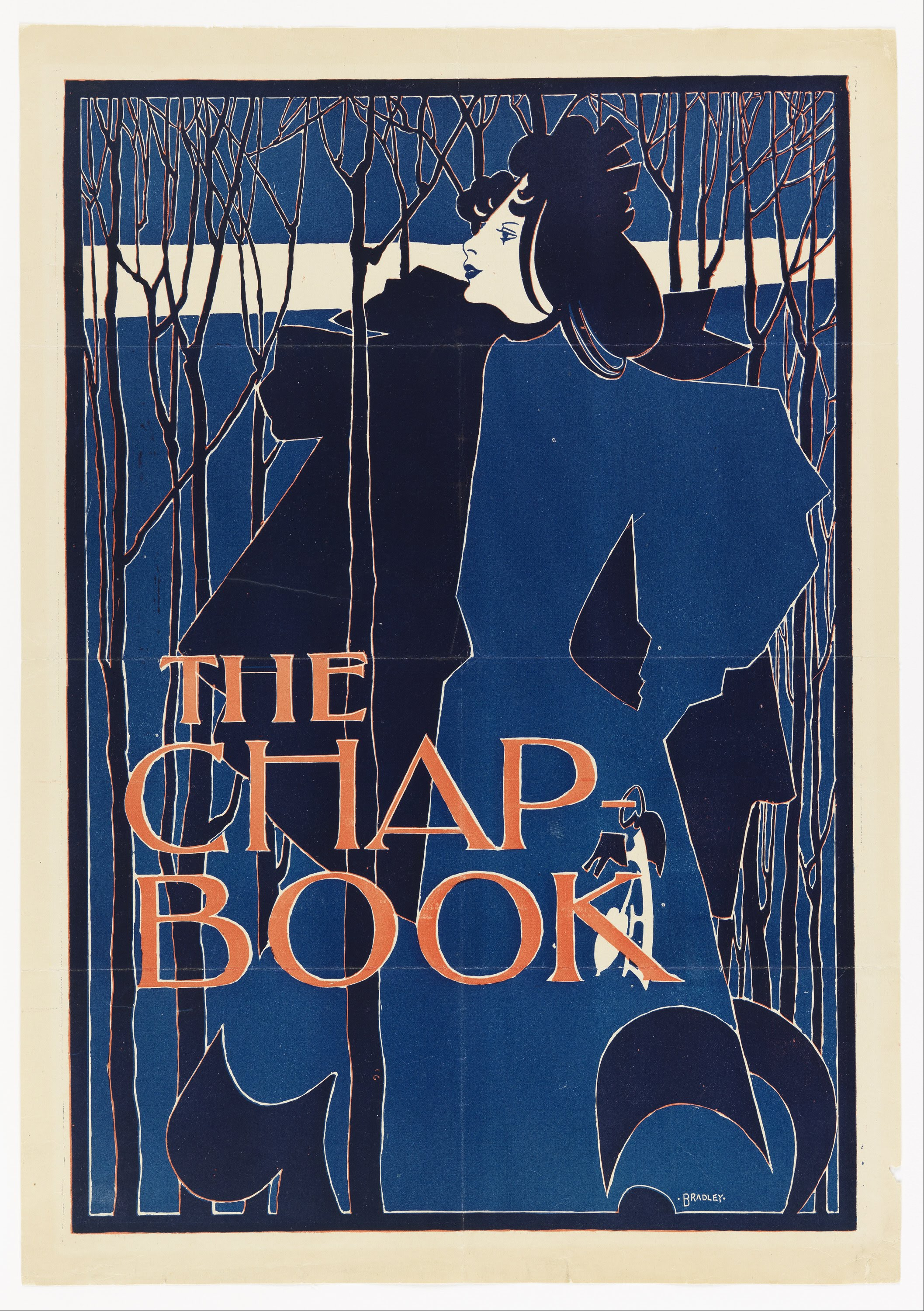
Poster for The Chap Book (1894)

Bradley's artistic style is considered a branch of Art Nouveau (where he was considered the foremost illustrator and poster designer of this movement) though it draws heavily from the aesthetics of the Arts and Crafts Movement and Japanese block printing. His work was often compared to that of his English contemporary, Aubrey Beardsley, so much so that some critics dismissed him as simply “The American Beardsley.” Bradley was already an established artist by the time Beardsley's designs became popular in England in 1894. Bradley's primary medium was posters, at the time a developing art form. Poster art was pioneered at the turn of the century by French artists like Jules Chéret and Toulouse-Lautrec, but Bradley is credited with popularizing the two-dimensional poster style in the United States.

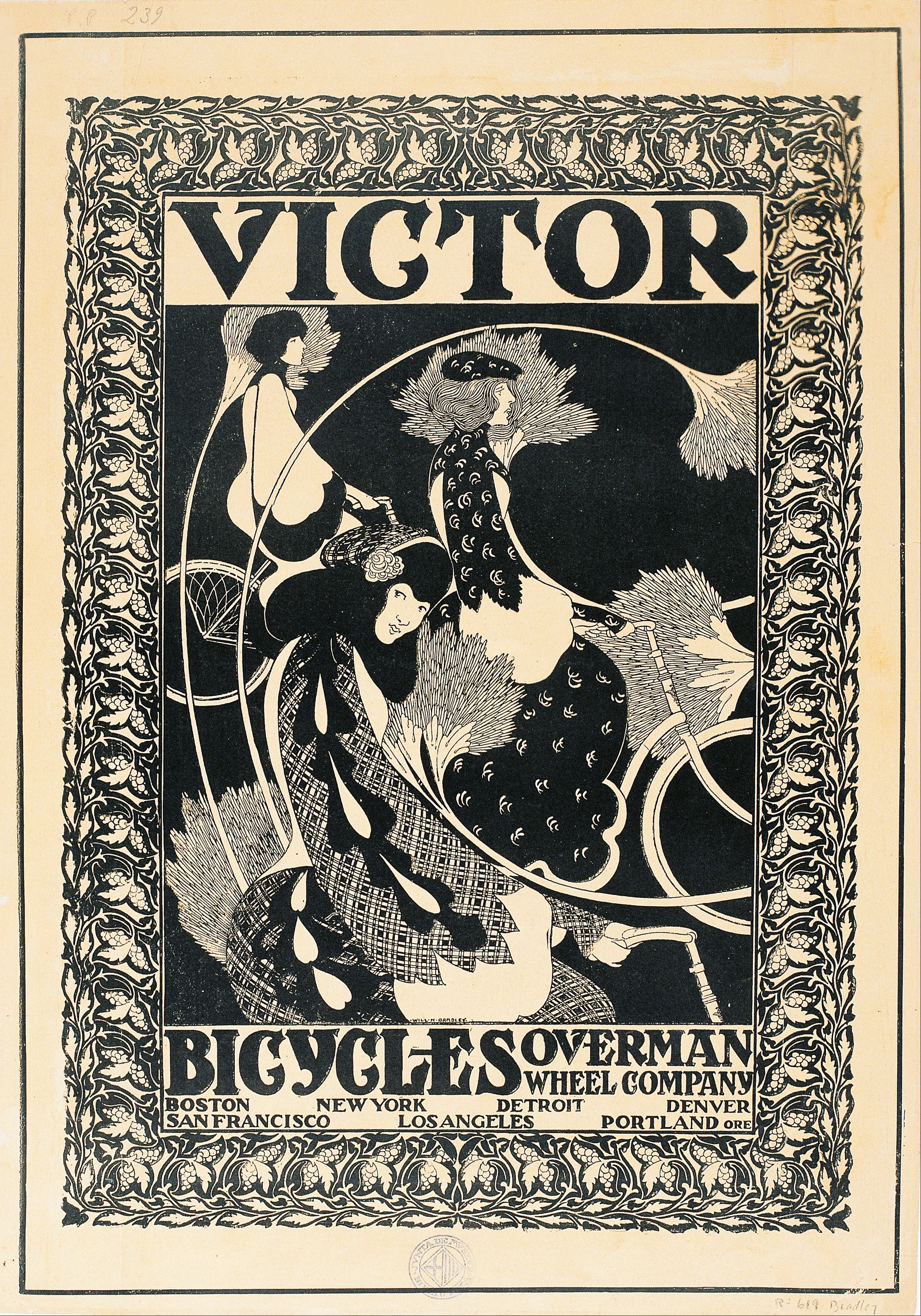
poster forVictor Bicycles

== Typefaces ==
Though Bradley, evidently, did not do the actual cutting of type matrixes, many types were based on his designs.

- Bradley Type (1894, Central Type Foundry), cut by Hermann Ihlenburg from Bradley's lettering for The Inland Printer. American Type Founders (ATF)—which had acquired Central Type Foundry—cut italic, extended, and outline versions of this face, while knock-offs were marketed by Inland Type Foundry (as "St. John"), A.D. Farmer & Son (as "Abbey Text"), and the Dickinson Type Foundry (as "Bradley Series").
- Wayside Roman (1900, ATF)
- Missal Initials (1904, ATF)
- Bewick Roman (1905, ATF)
- Vanity Initials (c. 1927, ATF)

== Writings ==
- Will Bradley: His Chapbook The Typophiles 1955 ASIN B0013090XK

== See also ==
- Art Nouveau posters and graphic arts
- Les Maîtres de l'Affiche
