= Johan Burlin =

Swedish professional ice hockey player

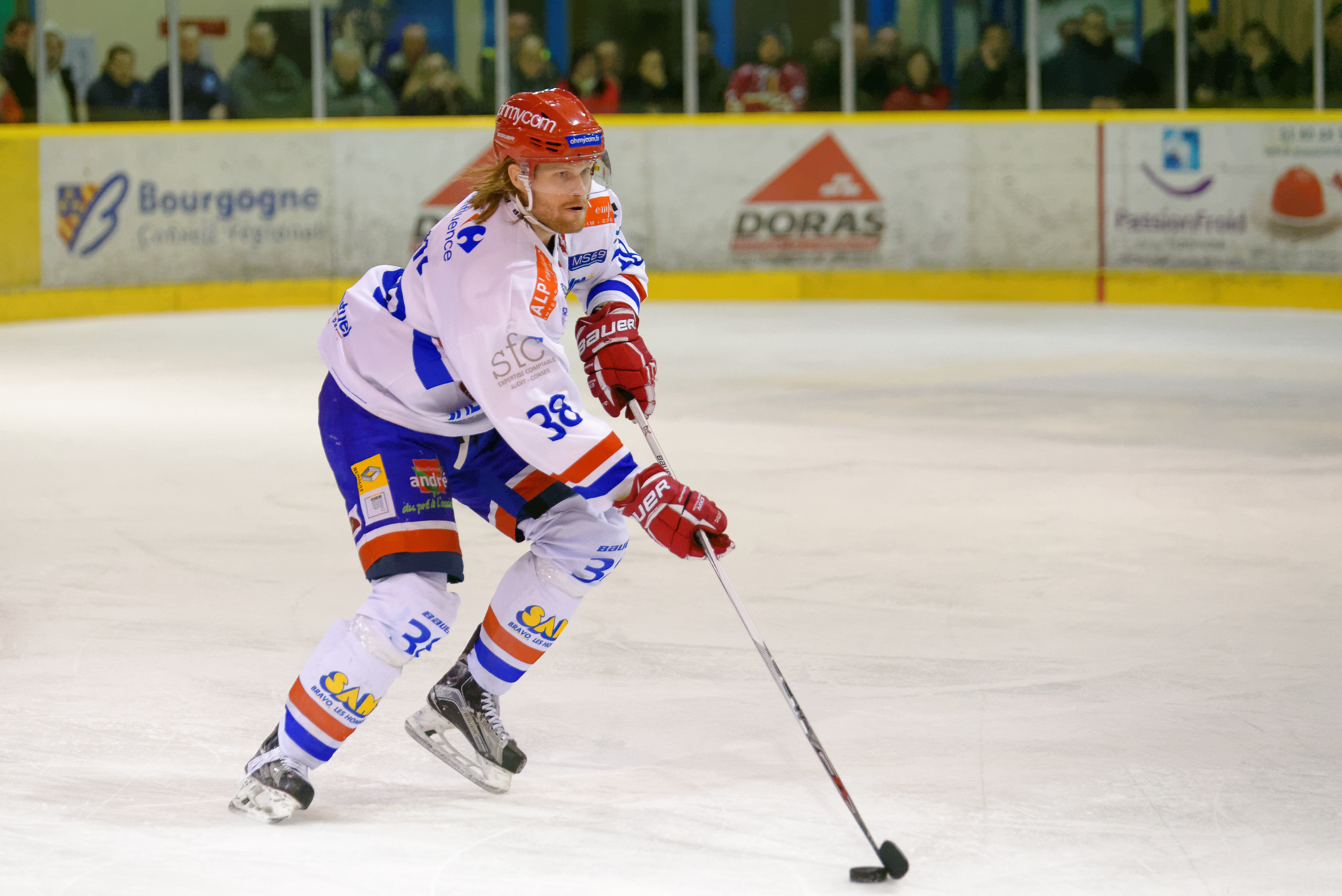
- Born: April 25, 1989 (age 37) Skellefteå, Sweden
- Height: 6 ft 2 in (188 cm)
- Weight: 194 lb (88 kg; 13 st 12 lb)
- Position: Defence
- Shot: Right
- Played for: Skellefteå AIK; HC Fassa; LHC Les Lions; SønderjyskE Ishockey; Étoile Noire de Strasbourg
- Playing career: 2007–2018

Johan Burlin (born April 25, 1989 in Skellefteå) is a Swedish former professional ice hockey player.

== Playing career ==
Burlin progressed through the youth hockey system maintained by Skellefteå AIK, including playing 31 games with their Elitserien club during the 2008–09 season. On 14 May 2009 left Skellefteå AIK and signed with Borås HC of the HockeyAllsvenskan. He played 12 games with the club before moving to Piteå HC in Division 1, the tier 3 league in Sweden, to complete the season.

During the 2010–11 season, Burlin played the majority of the season with Molot-Prikamye Perm a Russian team competing in the VHL. In 2011–12, Burlin returned to Sweden to play for IF Sundsvall Hockey, which was then competing in HockeyAllsvenskan. Burlin was on the move once more for the 2012–13 season, when he played for Lausitzer Füchse in 2nd Bundesliga, the German Tier 2 league. In 2013–14, he played for HC Fassa in Serie A, the top tier league in Italy. In the 2014 off-season, Burlin signed for KH Sanok in the PHL but was later released from the team without playing a single game. He was signed shortly after by Manchester Phoenix, 2014 champions of the EPIHL for the 2014–15 season.

== Career statistics ==
			Regular season					Playoffs
Season	Team	League	GP	G	A	Pts	PIM	GP	G	A	Pts	PIM
2004–05	Skellefteå AIK J18	J18 Allsvenskan	8	0	0	0	2	—	—	—	—	—
2005–06	Skellefteå AIK J18	J18 Allsvenskan	13	2	0	2	33	—	—	—	—	—
2006–07	Skellefteå AIK J18	J18 Allsvenskan	14	1	4	5	45	—	—	—	—	—
2006–07	Skellefteå AIK J20	J20 SuperElit	4	0	0	0	0	—	—	—	—	—
2007–08	Skellefteå AIK J20	J20 SuperElit	41	2	4	6	32	2	0	0	0	0
2007–08	Skellefteå AIK	Elitserien	1	0	0	0	0	—	—	—	—	—
2008–09	Skellefteå AIK J20	J20 SuperElit	27	0	4	4	90	6	0	1	1	8
2008–09	Skellefteå AIK	Elitserien	31	0	0	0	2	—	—	—	—	—
2009–10	Borås HC	HockeyAllsvenskan	12	0	0	0	8	—	—	—	—	—
2009–10	Piteå HC	Division 1	23	3	5	8	49	5	0	0	0	0
2010–11	Molot-Prikamye Perm	VHL	40	6	7	13	44	4	0	2	2	2
2010–11	Oktan Perm	Russia3	3	1	2	3	4	—	—	—	—	—
2011–12	IF Sundsvall Hockey	HockeyAllsvenskan	48	5	6	11	48	—	—	—	—	—
2012–13	Lausitzer Füchse	Germany2	37	7	10	17	46	—	—	—	—	—
2013–14	HC Fassa Falcons	Italy	38	2	16	18	40	3	0	0	0	0
2014–15	Manchester Phoenix	EPIHL	48	5	10	15	52	4	1	3	4	4
2015–16	LHC Les Lions	Ligue Magnus	26	3	1	4	28	—	—	—	—	—
2016–17	Kitzbüheler EC	AlpsHL	35	5	17	22	22	—	—	—	—	—
2016–17	SønderjyskE Ishockey	Denmark	4	0	0	0	2	6	0	0	0	8
2017–18	Étoile Noire de Strasbourg	Ligue Magnus	26	0	6	6	24	—	—	—	—	—
Elitserien totals			32	0	0	0	2	—	—	—	—	—
HockeyAllsvenskan totals			60	5	6	11	56	—	—	—	—	—
Division 1 totals			23	3	5	8	49	5	0	0	0	0
Ligue Magnus totals			52	3	7	10	52	—	—	—	—	—
AlpsHL totals			35	5	17	22	22	—	—	—	—	—
