= Ault Park (Ontario) =

Coordinates: 45.0329°N 74.8516°W

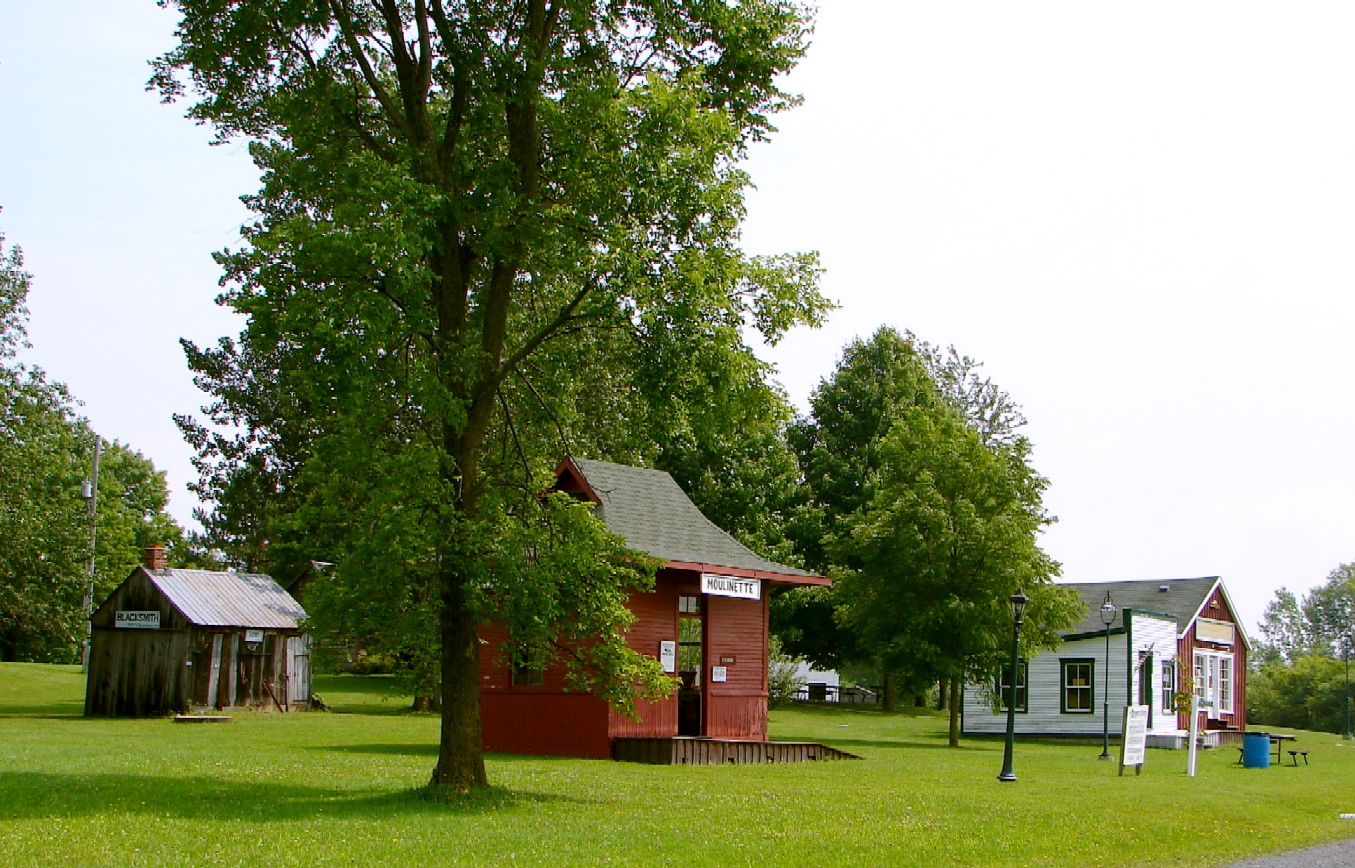
- Location: Saint Lawrence River in the Township of South Stormont, near Long Sault, Ontario, Canada
- Type: living museum
- Website: www.lostvillages.ca

Ault Park is a park on the St. Lawrence River in the Township of South Stormont, near Long Sault, Ontario, Canada.

Originally on Sheek's Island, the park was built on family property donated to the Township of Cornwall by Levi Addison Ault.

Sheek's Island was submerged by the St. Lawrence Seaway project in 1958, and Ault Park was rebuilt on the new river shore.

== Lost Villages Museum ==
It is now home to the Lost Villages Historical Society, who operate the Lost Villages Museum, a living museum incorporating a number of buildings moved from the villages. Other buildings from the villages were moved to a site near Morrisburg to create Upper Canada Village.

== Important archaeological digs ==
The original site of Ault Park on Sheek Island was also the site of an important archaeological excavation between 1956 and 1958, before the island and dig site were permanently submerged under 14-feet of water for the construction of the St. Lawrence Seaway. This project, a joint project of the University of Toronto and the National Museum of Canada, was largely a salvage operation to conserve the artifacts left behind from many cultures of people including remnants of a village believed to date back 3500 years. The University of Toronto petitioned for an injunction against the Seaway project in order to continue the excavations however they were not successful. A number of artifacts were taken from the site for further investigation.

Some of the cultures who were found to have inhabited the island were multi-component-Middle Archaic, Laurentian, Archaic, Meadowood, Point Peninsula, Pickering, and the St. Lawrence Iroquois.

== Affiliations ==
The Museum is affiliated with CMA, CHIN, and Virtual Museum of Canada.
