= William Snelling Hadaway =

American artist

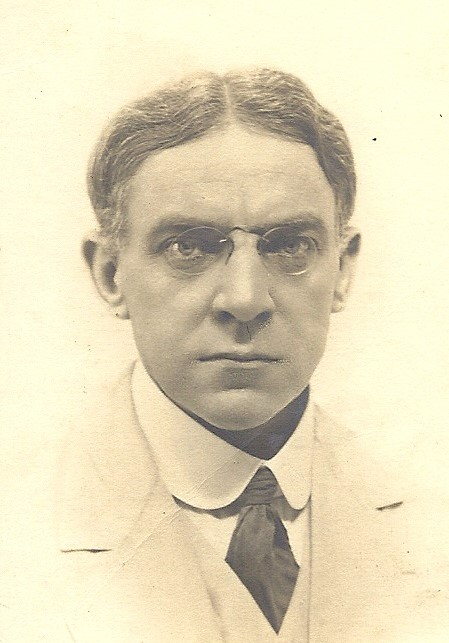
Portrait of William Snelling Hadaway

William Snelling Hadaway (1872–1941) was an American artist who worked in Madras, India. He specialized in book illustration and in jewelry and metal design. He trained in Massachusetts in the 1890s "at the Museum of Fine Arts, under C. Howard Walker and Miss Elizabeth Child." He belonged to the Boston Art Students' Association. After school "he spent two years studying in Sicily and Italy." Beginning in 1907 he worked in India for the Madras School of Arts; he stayed until 1927. He developed an expertise in Indian visual arts and published several works on the subject. His papers reside in the Victoria and Albert Museum. He also donated chintz process samples to the V&A, which have been displayed and published many times over the years.

== Early life and education ==
William Snelling Hadaway was born in Malden, Massachusetts in 1872, son of Ephraim Locke Hadaway (1848–1914) and Helen Agnes Noyes Hadaway (1848–1935). He was descended from John Hadaway (sometimes spelled Hathaway, 1617-1697) who was born in Symondsbury, Dorset, England and who emigrated to Massachusetts on the "Blessing" in 1635. William told his younger daughter Hilary that his first job was in a hardware shop where he "learnt the flashpoints of oils". He studied art in Boston, becoming a member of the Boston Art Students Association in whose Artists’ Directory he is listed on page 32.

== Personal life ==
In 1893, aged 21, he married Julia Peck (1864–1935), and applied on 30 December 1893 in New York for a passport for himself and wife. They left for Italy on 4 January 1894. On 22 December 1894 he applied for an emergency passport in the US Embassy in Rome, in joint names, saying he was temporarily residing in Naples. He then returned to the US on this passport, without Julia, on 26 June 1895. Julia is listed as returning to New York on 2 September 1895 aboard the "Werra" from Genoa. They divorced shortly afterwards.

Julia subsequently pursued a career as an artist under the name Julia Peck Hadaway. She is listed in the 1910 Census as living in Suffolk, Mass., divorced, aged 46. She specialised in Italian and local scenes; a Venetian canal scene (oil on canvas, 20 ½ x 11 ½ ) was for sale in 1992 in the Barridoff Galleries, Portland, Maine. She died in Venice in 1935.

After his return, William was again active in the Boston art circles. He attended the opening of the annual exhibition of the Boston Arts Students Association on November 18, 1895 (Boston Globe Nov. 24 1895, page 21). William was later involved in the publication of “Friar Jerome’s Beautiful Book” in 1896 –heavily influenced by the publications from the Kelmscott Print founded by William Morris in 1891 as part of the Arts and Crafts movement. William’s illustrations in “Bradley his Book” 1897 follow the same artistic scheme. He met Jean Louise Carré (1865–1939), who had arrived in New York from Nova Scotia in September 1894 describing herself as a "tourist". She was French Canadian, her father had originally come from Guernsey, her mother had died in childbirth (hers) and her father 2 ½ years later. She was brought up by an uncle and his family in Pictou, Nova Scotia, and had an uncle in Guernsey.

They left the US for England together in October 1897. They married 1904, in St Pancras, when their first two children (Jean Carré, known as Jack, 1898-1950, and Lesley Anne, 1899-1985) were aged 6 and 5. Their third child Hilary Stella Mary Snelling was born in 1905 and died in 1995. Jack went on to serve in the Indian Army, was captured by the Japanese at the fall of Singapore and spent the remainder of the war as a prisoner of war. He married Gabrielle Hall in 1929. Lesley Anne married Basil Owen Ellis, who worked for a firm exporting leather from India. Hilary qualified as a doctor, was a major in the Royal Army Medical Corps during World War 2 and spent the rest of her career working in public health in London.

== Career ==
William forged a highly successful artistic career in London, working as a designer, silversmith and teacher. Jean was also a jeweller and drawer of fashion designs, and sometimes they worked together. They moved to Bushey in 1902 or 3 where William studied with Hubert von Herkomer.

In 1907 William was offered the post of Superintendent of the Madras Government School of Arts, which he held to 1927. Under his regime the students made jewellery, furniture and other artefacts. William also wrote monographs on cotton printing in the Madras presidency and Indian metalwork, copies of which may be found in the Victoria and Albert Museum.

An insight into his character is to be found in an anecdote told in The Hindu of May 6, 2009. Sculptor Mani Nagappa is talking about his father Rao Bahadur M.S. Nagappa's life. His father became William Hadaway's assistant at the School after an unconventional job interview. As Mani Nagappa tells it: "It was mid-term at the Madras School of Arts when my father MS Nagappa wanted to join the institution as a student. The watchman would not let him in. My father hung around and drew a picture of the watchman, when he was sound asleep. When the principal Hadaway was leaving in his car, my father threw the sheet in. The Britisher [sic] was impressed with the sketch and appointed my father his assistant".

When an unidentified epidemic involving swelling broke out in Madras in the early 1900s the British government asked Hadaway to commission a painting of a victim to assist with diagnosis. Hadaway gave Nagappa the job, and he did a painting based on a cast of a dead victim. The painting was apparently of use to the medical team back in London.

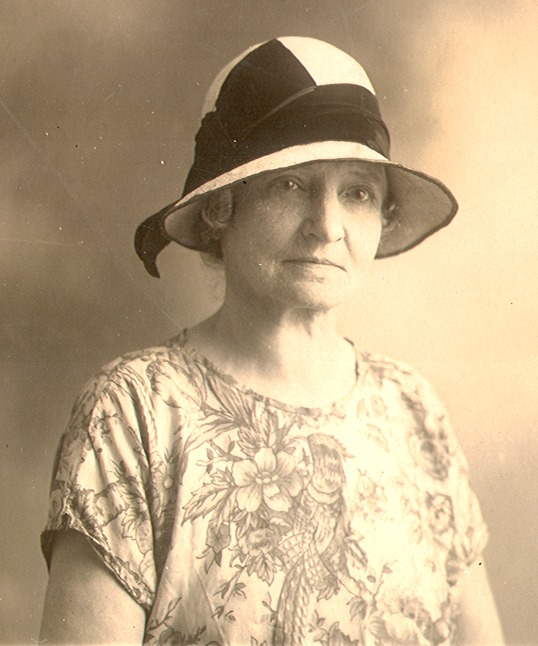
Jean Louise Carré Hadaway

William and his wife stayed in India until 1934, when they returned to the UK via New Zealand. They retired to Roquebrune-Cap Martin on the French Riviera. In June 1939, after Jean’s death, William Snelling Hadaway travelled back to New England for the first time in 42 years, where he was greeted at the dockside by his sisters Mabel (Mrs Frank Snow) and Bertha Hadaway. He had last seen them in 1902, when they, with their mother Helen, visited him and Jean and their first two children in London. He returned to France shortly before the outbreak of World War 2. He moved from Roquebrune-Cap Martin into Monte Carlo, where he lived at no 12 Passage Grana. Here he was looked after by his housekeeper, a Mme Rimboldi. He died from a heart attack in October 1941. She continued to live at the address. In May 1945 his younger daughter Dr Hilary Hadaway, by now a Major in the Royal Army Medical Corps, flew to Nice with RAF Transport Command in order to recover his belongings, including furniture, artworks and papers. There followed a legal dispute with the housekeeper over ownership of some items which she claimed had been given to her, after which Hilary managed to transport the bulk of his estate back to England.

== Images ==
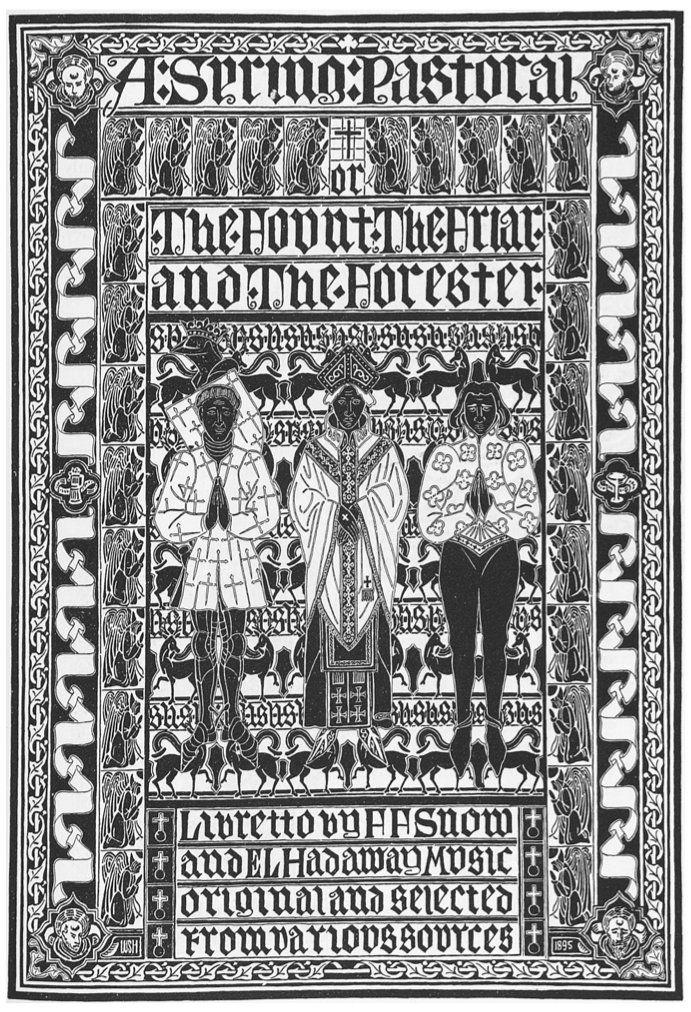
Illustration by W.S. Hadaway, 1895: "A Spring Pastoral or the Fount, the Friar and the Forester. Libretto by F.F. Snow and E.L. Hadaway. Music original and selected from various sources"

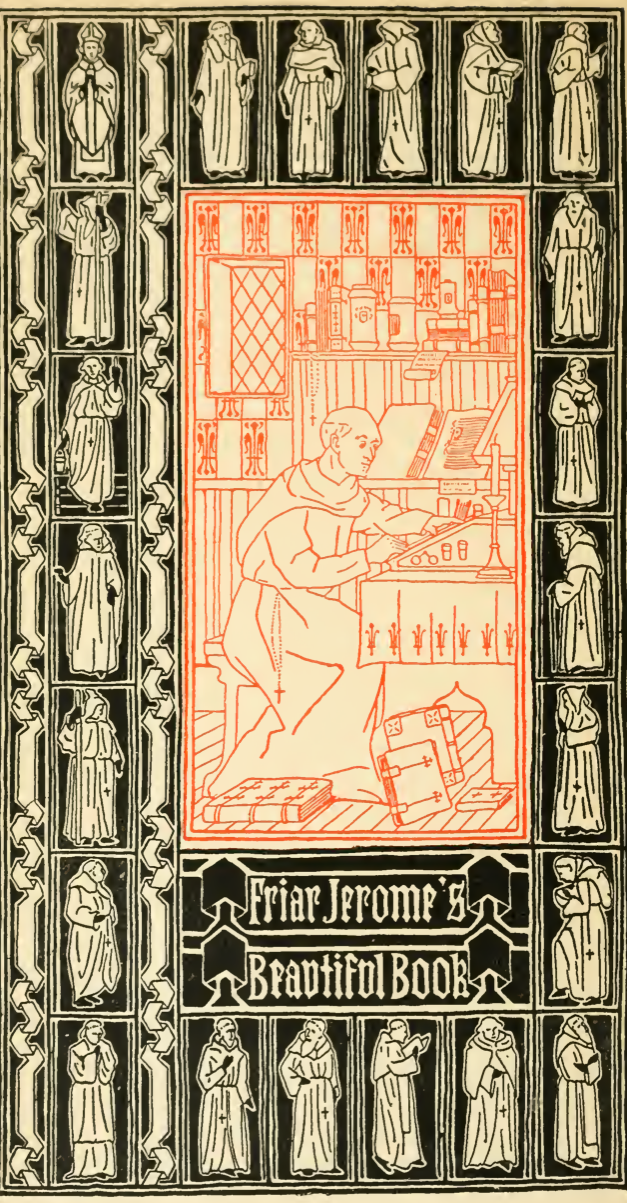
Thomas Bailey Aldrich's Friar Jerome's beautiful book with decorations by W.S. Hadaway, 1896

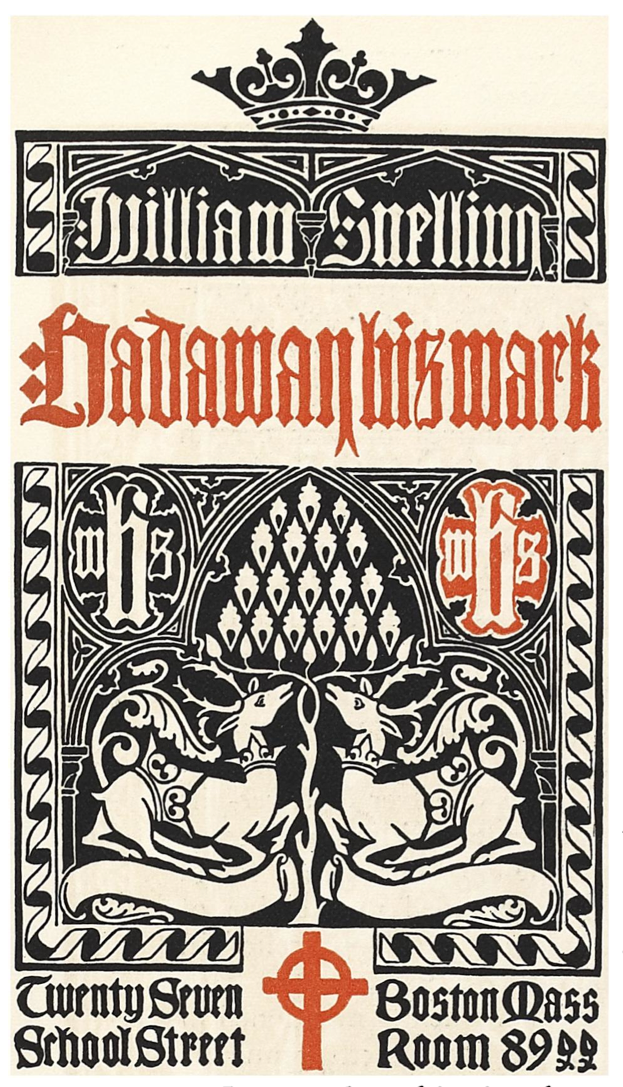
"William Snelling Hadaway his mark. Twenty seven School Street, Boston Mass, Room 89"

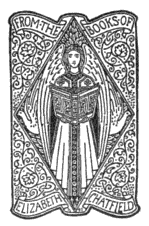
Bookplate for Elizabeth Chatfield, designed by Hadaway
