= Paul Burlin =

American painter (1886–1969)

- Born: September 10, 1886; New York City, U.S.
- Died: March 13, 1969 (aged 82); New York City, U.S.
- Occupation: Painter
- Spouse(s): Natalie Curtis (1917–1921), Margarete (Margot) Koop (1924–1936), Helen Simonson (1937–1946), Margaret (Peggy) Timmerman (1947–1969)

Paul Burlin (September 10, 1886 – March 13, 1969) was an American modern and abstract expressionist painter.

== Childhood ==
Paul Burlin was born to Jacob and Julia Berlin in 1886 in New York. The family name was originally Berlinsky. His father was from London. His mother from a small city in Northern Germany near the Polish border. Burlin grew up in New York City and London, the oldest of three children. His sister, Carrie, was born in 1890. His brother, David, in 1895.

== Artistic education ==
From 1900 to 1912, Burlin was a part-time student at the National Academy of Art and the Art Student's League.

== Travels ==
Burlin was able to travel in Europe in 1908 to 1909. He visited the Southwestern United States in 1910. The southwestern paintings he made on the trip to Santa Fe, New Mexico were shown in New York in 1911. The critical acclaim of this exhibition led to his invitation to participate in the Armory Show.

== Armory Show ==
Burlin was invited to participate in the 1913 69th Regiment Armory Show in New York, the first Modern art exhibition in the United States. This was the exhibit that brought the work of the European vanguard, such as Picasso, Manet, Monet, and Degas to the United States.

== Santa Fe ==
Burlin moved to Santa Fe in 1913 and painted there until 1920, while exhibiting his work in New York City. He painted portraits of Pueblo Indians, landscapes, and scenes of local daily life. These themes sold well in New York. Burlin was heavily influenced by the spirituality of the Pueblo Indians. Realist works gave way to experimentation with symbols and anthropomorphism. His work was shown at the Pennsylvania Academy of the Fine Arts exhibition in 1919.

== First marriage ==
Paul Burlin met Natalie Curtis (1875–1921), in 1914. Burlin married Natalie Curtis, in 1917. She was an ethnomusicologist working to preserve Native American Indian music in New Mexico. Natalie Curtis is best known for her 1907, "The Indians' Book".

== European artistic exile ==
Burlin and Natalie moved to Paris in 1921. Shortly after a presentation at a conference on ethnomusicology, Natalie was struck by a taxi on the street and killed. Paul was devastated. He remained in France. In 1924, he married his second wife, Margarete (Margot) Koop. Margarete was the mother of his only child, Barbara, who was born in 1927. Paul exhibited in New York, and in Paris. He studied European abstract painting styles, which influenced his increasingly socially concerned themes. His work was included in the New York Museum of Modern Art's Ninth Exhibition of Painting and Sculpture by Living Americans in 1930. Three of his paintings were shown: Flowers, 1927, Horses in Stable, ca. 1928, and Hills and Houses. Burlin was not able to attend, however, since he was still in Paris.

== Return to the United States ==
In 1932, Burlin, his wife, and daughter moved back to the United States. They settled in New York, where Burlin lived for the rest of his life, when he was not traveling or working as an artist in residence. He worked as a member of the Federal Project of the Whitney Museum. Burlin was also among those who signed the call for the American Artist's Congress in 1936. In 1936, Burlin and Margarete divorced. Burlin married Helen Simonson in 1937.

== Second World War ==
Burlin used images from Greek mythology to paint commentary against the brutality of war. He was especially concerned with Jewish persecution. Burlin's own abstract expressionist form crystallized. His key symbols begin to emerge. Paul Burlin exhibited in the 1944 Art in Progress show.

== Abstract expressionism ==
Burlin begins to use abstract expressionism as a mode for personal expression. Burlin divorced his third wife in 1946 and married Margaret (Peggy) Timmerman in 1947. He and Margaret remained together for the rest of his life. Burlin was invited to be Artist in Residence at many universities and museums including University of Minnesota, Washington University in St. Louis, University of Colorado Boulder, University of Wyoming, University of Southern California, Union College, and University of Texas at Austin.

== Last days ==
In the 1950s, Burlin began to lose his sight. In the next ten years he underwent eight cornea implants. His despair at losing his sight was often a theme in his work. He painted, even at the times when he was declared legally blind. In a respite from the darkness, he painted The Series of Nine very near the end of his life. Paul Burlin died in 1969. The nine final paintings, which summarize and celebrate the life of the painter were shown at the NY MOMA in 1971, and at the Pasadena Museum in 1972.

== Honors and awards ==
- 1913 Art exhibited in the Armory Show
- 1930 Included in the Museum of Modern Art's Ninth Exhibition of Painting and Sculpture by Living Americans
- 1945 The artist's jury for the Pepsi-cola "Portrait of America" contest awarded Burlin first prize for his work titled the "Soda Jerker". The prize was to be $2500. But, Pepsi-cola chose another winner, and Burlin was not allowed to collect.
- 1959 One of three first prize winners of $1000 for Art USA: 59, New York, for "Rose, White, Uptight."
- 1962 First prize from the Pennsylvania Academy for "Red, Red, Not the Same II"
- 1962 Listed as one of 102 Artists "To Wax Enthusiastic About" in Time Magazine, July 6, 1962.
- 1963 Burlin mentioned in the 50th anniversary of the 1913 Armory Show.

=== Retrospectives ===
- 1962: The American Federation of Arts: Exhibitions in Philadelphia, Boston, and New York City, sponsored by the Ford Foundation Program in Humanities and the Arts
- 1970-1971: The Museum of Modern Art in New York City and the Pasadena Art Museum in Pasadena, California, Exhibition of The Last Nine

== Public Collections ==
- Albuquerque Museum of Art and History
- Metropolitan Museum of Art
- Museum of Modern Art
- Whitney Museum of American Art
- New Mexico Museum of Art
