= Taboo (1922 play) =

Play by Mary Hoyt Wiborg

Taboo is a play first performed in 1922, written by Mary Hoyt Wiborg.

It is set on a plantation in Louisiana before the American Civil War and in Africa. It opened on April 4, 1922, in the Sam Harris Theater, Harlem. It starred Margaret Wycherly, the only white member of the cast, Paul Robeson, other African American actors, and African students at Columbia University. An African dance was performed by Columbus Kamba Simango, a Mozambican student at Columbia. This was one of Robeson's first stage opportunities and his performance was praised by critics.
