= Natalie Curtis =

American ethnomusicologist (1875–1921)

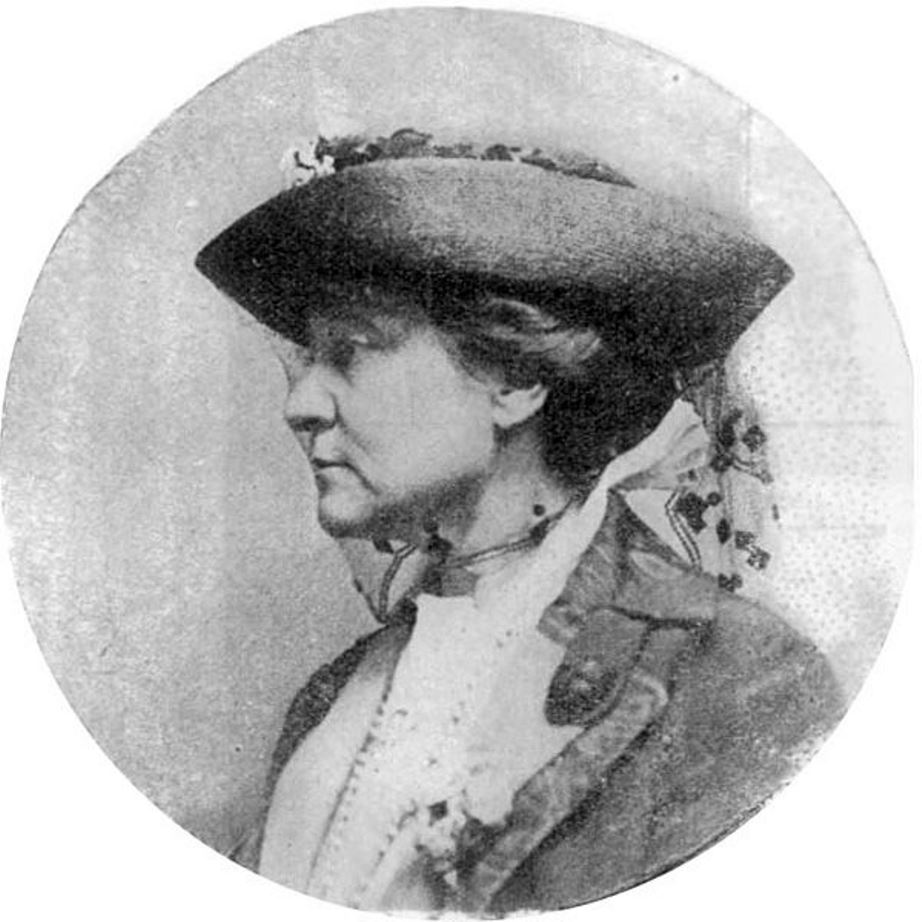
Natalie Curtis Burlin

Natalie Curtis, later Natalie Curtis Burlin (26 April 1875 – 23 October 1921) was an American ethnomusicologist. Curtis, along with Alice Cunningham Fletcher and Frances Densmore, was one of a small group of women doing important ethnological studies in North America at the beginning of the 20th century. She is remembered for her transcriptions and publication of traditional music of Native American tribes as well as for having published a four-volume collection of African-American music. Her career was cut short by her accidental death in 1921.

== Early life and influences ==
Natalie Curtis was born on 26 April 1875 in New York City. She studied music at the National Conservatory of Music of America in New York City. She also studied in France and Germany, studying with prominent musicians, like Ferruccio Busoni.

She came to be fascinated by Native American music, and began to devote herself to its study, which she furthered during a trip to Arizona with her older brother George.

=== Theodore Roosevelt ===
Theodore Roosevelt was a family friend of Curtis, and one of her biggest influences. Curtis used Roosevelt as a helpful tool when it came to preserving Native American cultures. At one point, Curtis even entered Roosevelt's house to ask for tribal land rights with Mojave-Apache chief. Roosevelt addressed Curtis as one "who has done so very much to give Indian culture its proper position". He also contributed a brief foreword to her collection of Native American music and folklore The Indians' Book, in which he remarked on "the depth and dignity of Indian thought".

== Career ==
Starting in 1903 she worked from the Hopi reservation in Arizona and produced transcriptions using both an Edison cylinder recorder and pencil and paper. At the time, such work with native music and language was in conflict with the policies of the federal Bureau of Indian Affairs, which discouraged natives on reservations from speaking their language, singing their music, dressing in native garb, etc. It was only after the personal intervention of her friend (now President) Theodore Roosevelt that she could continue her work unhindered. Roosevelt himself visited the Hopi reservation in 1913 for the Hopi flute and snake ceremonies, which visit was detailed by Curtis in "Theodore Roosevelt in Hopi Land", an article she wrote for The Outlook magazine in 1919.

=== Songs ===
In 1905, Curtis published The Songs of Ancient America, three Pueblo corn-grinding songs with piano accompaniment. Characterizing her own task as a transcriber, she wrote, "I have in nowise changed the melodies, nor have I sought to harmonize them in the usual sense, nor to make of them musical compositions…My one desire has been to let the Indian songs be heard as the Indians themselves sing them..."

In 1907 Curtis published The Indians' Book, a collection of songs and stories from 18 tribes, illustrated with handwritten transcriptions of songs as well as with artwork and photography. Most of the 200 songs are presented only in manuscript notation with no piano accompaniment at all. The book served as source for her former teacher Busoni's Indian Fantasy, a work for piano and orchestra, first performed in 1915 by the Philadelphia Orchestra under Leopold Stokowski.

Around 1910, Curtis broadened her research to include transcription and collection of African American music, working at the Hampton Institute in Hampton, Virginia, a college established in 1868 to educate former slaves. The work was funded by philanthropist George Foster Peabody. In 1911, she and David Mannes founded the Music School Settlement for Colored People in New York, and in 1912 she helped sponsor the first concert featuring black musicians at Carnegie Hall, a concert that featured the Clef Club orchestra, directed by James Reese Europe.

In 1917 she married modern and abstract expressionist artist Paul Burlin. They moved to France in 1921 to escape what Burlin's biographer described as "the bitter reaction against modern art in the years immediately following the First World War."

In 1918 and 1919 Curtis (now Curtis Burlin) published four volumes entitled Negro Folk-Songs; the volumes included spirituals, and "work-and play-songs". She published the songs in four-part harmony, a task that brought praise from composer Percy Grainger in 1918. Proceeds from the volumes went to the Hampton Institute. Curtis also began to study the music of African tribes and in 1920 published Songs and Tales from the Dark Continent, in which she notated the written example of what is known as the standard pattern in ethnomusicology, and triple-pulse son clave in Afro-Latin music (1920: 98). The book features musical contributions from C. Kamba Simango, a speaker of the Ndau language, and Madikane Čele, a speaker of the Zulu language.

She died in a traffic accident in Paris, France, on 23 October 1921.

Her published work rarely appeared in scholarly journals of anthropology or folklore. Instead, she published in more popular periodicals such as the Southern Workman, The Craftsman, and The Outlook, as well as in general musical publications such as Musical America. Reviews of her work appeared in such magazines as well as in standard scholarly journals of the day.

== Original compositions ==
Curtis Burlin may be considered among a small group of US American composers who used native American material in her own compositions. Others are Charles Wakefield Cadman, Arthur Nevin, and Thurlow Lieurance. She composed about 15 short, original works, many based on native American or African American themes.

== See also ==
- Native American music
