= Columbus Kamba Simango =

Mozambican ethnographer, missionary, musician, activist (1890–1966)

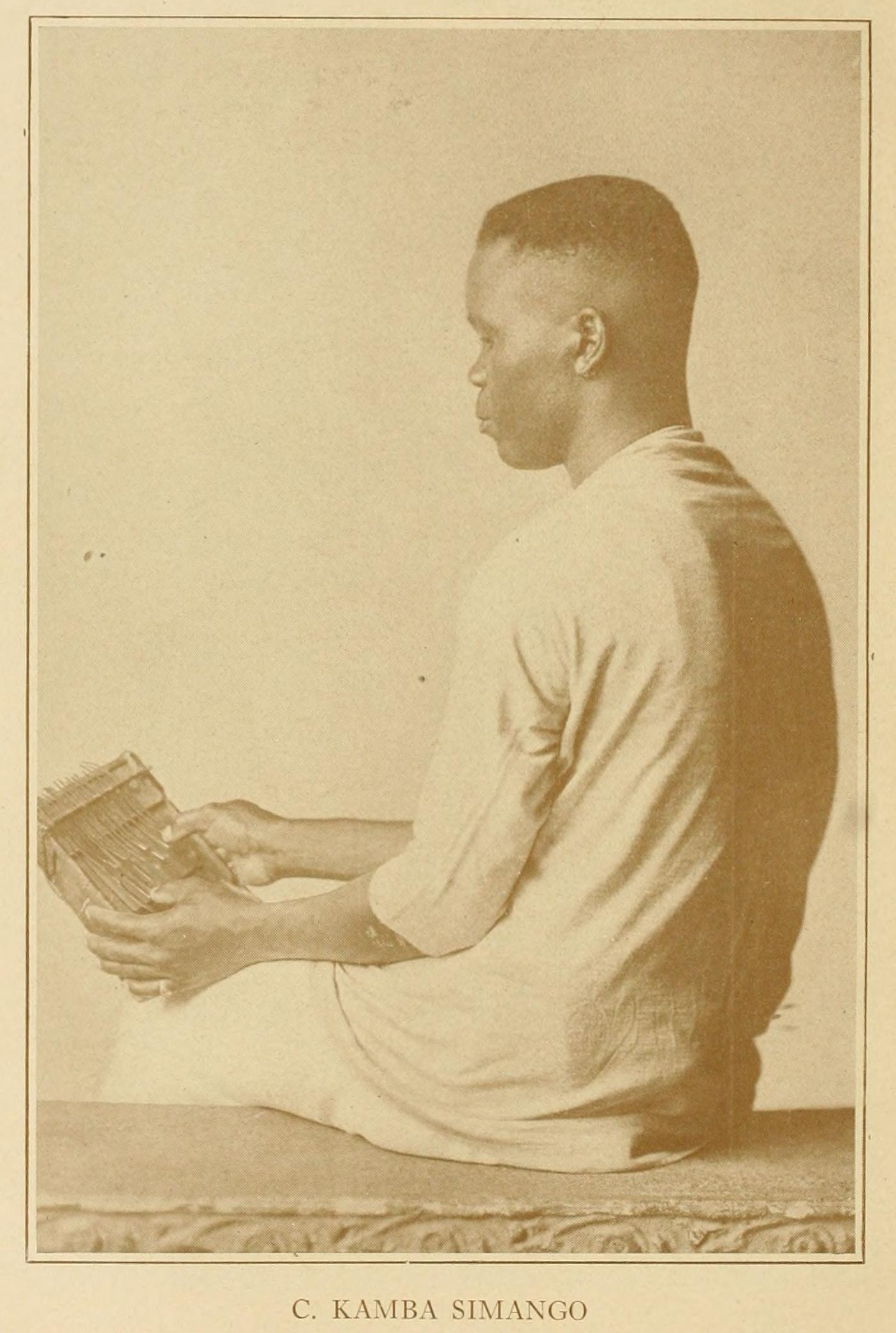
- C. Kamba Simango with a kalimba (mbira)
- Born: 1890; Machanga District, Mozambique
- Died: 1966 (aged 75–76); Ghana
- Occupations: ethnographer; missionary

Columbus Kamba Simango (1890–1966), often known as Kamba Simango, was an ethnographer, missionary, musician, performer and activist of Vandau ethnicity.

== Biography ==
Simango was born in 1890 in Machanga District, Mozambique of Vandau ethnicity. He attended a Congregational Mission school in Beira, followed by studies at Mount Selinda and Lovedale.

In 1914, he went to the United States to study at the Hampton Institute, under the auspices of the American Board of Missions. After this he went to the Teachers College at Columbia University, graduating in 1923. During this time, in April 1922, he participated as a dancer in the play Taboo, presented at the Sam H. Harris Theater in Harlem. The lead in Taboo was Paul Robeson (1898–1976), who became a friend of Simango. While in New York he met the anthropologist Franz Boas who encouraged him to become a native ethnographer. They corresponded for years. While in New York at the time of the Harlem Renaissance, he also became friends with Pan-Africanist W. E. B. Du Bois. As a Vandau intellectual, he collaborated with many anthropologists and Africanists, such as Melville Herskovits, Henri-Philippe Junod and Dora Earthy. He also worked with Natalie Curtis.

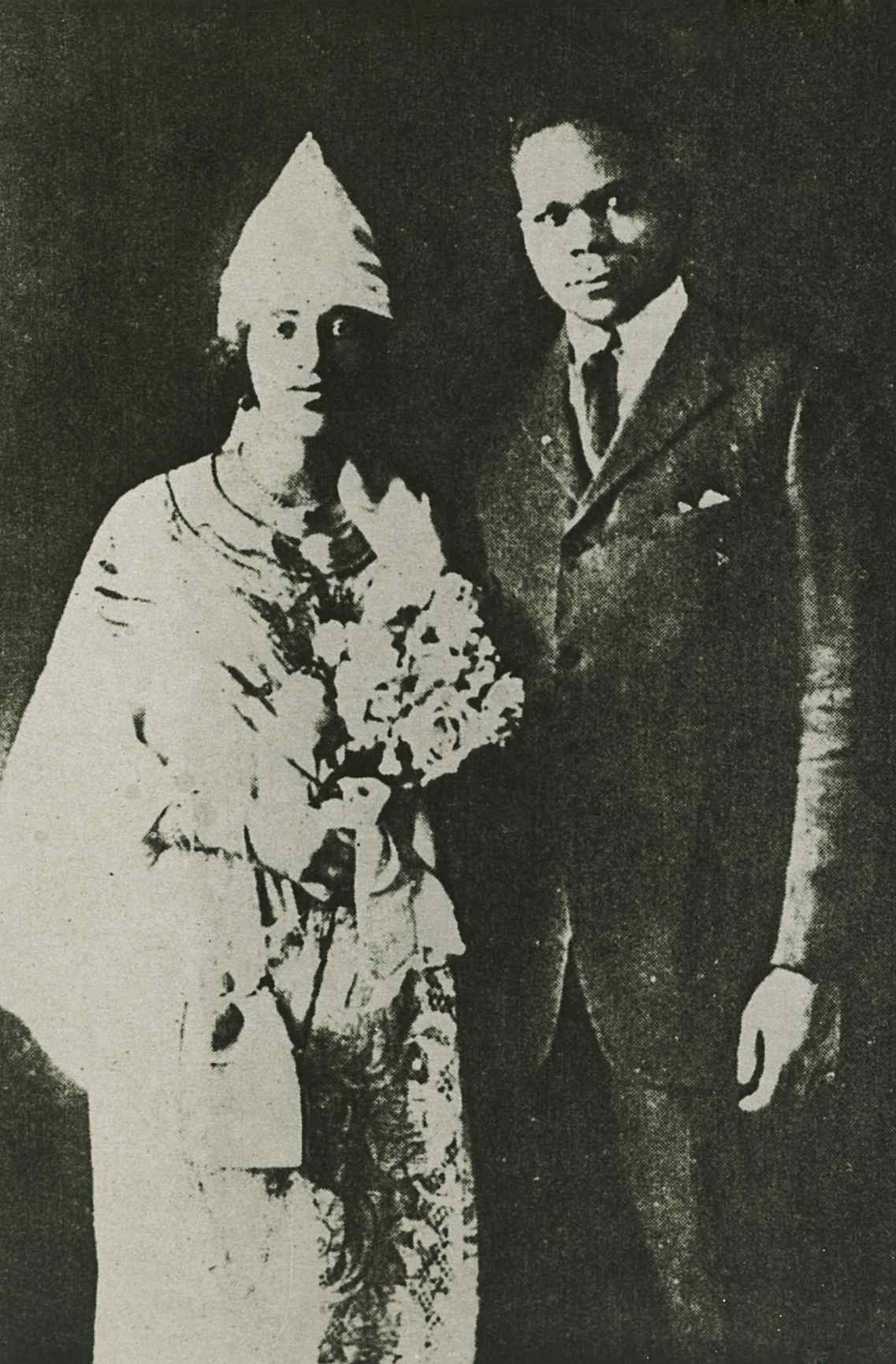
Kamba Simango on his wedding to Kathleen Easmon

He was married first to missionary poet Kathleen Mary Easmon Simango on 1 June 1922. They had met in New York. After she died unexpectedly from appendicitis in 1924, he married Kathleen's cousin, Christine Cousey (in September 1925), with whom he had three children.

The couple worked as missionaries in Angola and Mozambique from 1926 to 1936; they then moved to Ghana where they opened a hotel and later ran a Portuguese language radio station. Simango died in a hit and run accident in 1966.

== Notable achievements ==
In November 1923, Simango participated in the Third Pan-African Congress, organized in London.

In 1934–1935 he helped found the Mozambican organization Grémio Negrófilo de Manica e Sofala; the Grémio lasted until 1956 (under the name of Núcleo Negrófilo) when it was outlawed for connections to an anticolonial uprising in the Machanga and Mambone regions.

A street is named after him in Maputo.

== Publications ==
- Curtis, Natalie, Kamba Simango, and Madikane Cele, 1920. Songs and Tales from the Dark Continent, recorded from the singing and the sayings of C. Kamba Simango and Madikane Cele, New York, Boston, G. Schirmer.
- « Tales and Proverbs of the Vandau of Portuguese South Africa », Franz Boas & Kamba Simango, 1922

== Bibliography ==
- Macagno, Lorenzo. 2022 "From Mozambique to New York: The Cosmopolitan Pathways of Kamba Simango, African Disciple of Franz Boas
- Morier-Genoud, Eric. 2011. "Columbus Kamba Simango." in : H. L. Gates Jr. and Emmanuel Akyeampong (eds.) Dictionary of African Biography, Oxford : Oxford University Press.
