= The Inland Printer =

American magazine published in Chicago

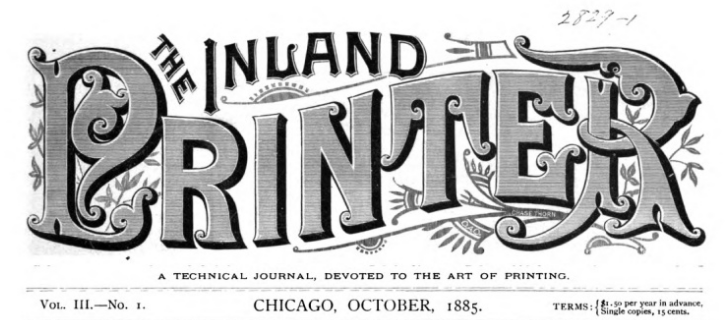

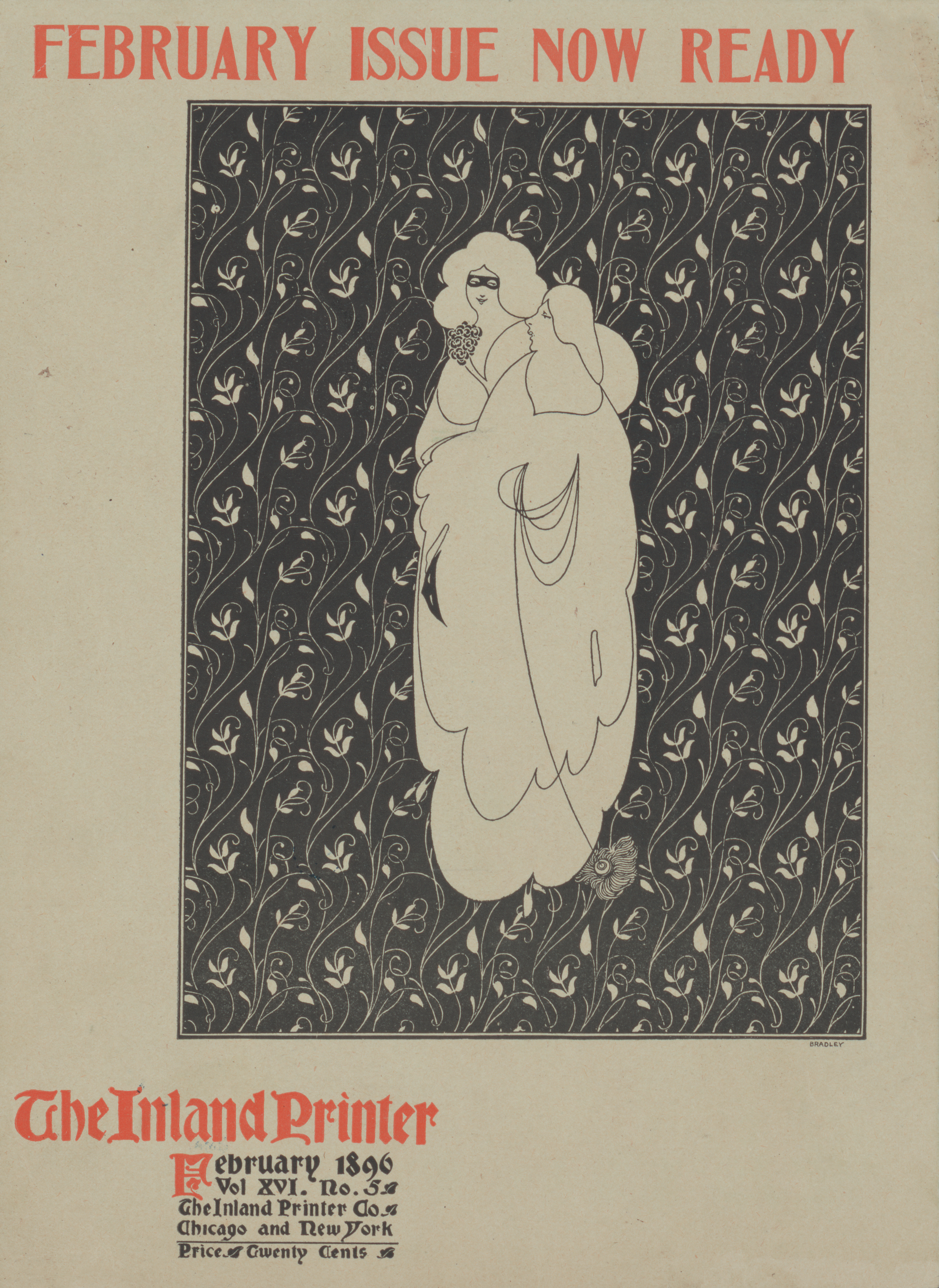
- Cover of the February 1896 issue by Will H. Bradley
- Founded: 1883
- Final issue: August 2011
- Country: United States
- ISSN: 0073-8042
- OCLC: 956742269

The Inland Printer was an American trade magazine about printing and graphic design. It was founded in 1883 and, after several name changes, stopped publishing in 2011.

The Inland Printer was first published in Chicago, Illinois, in 1883. Described as a trade journal, it initially focused on graphic design and book design and later changed to emphasize printing. An 1898 series by William E. Loy profiled 15 typographers.

In 1894, encouraged by the graphic artist Will H. Bradley, whose illustrations appeared in the magazine, Inland Printer began to change its cover with each issue—the first American magazine to do so. Inland Printer also published J. C. Leyendecker's work.

Inland Printer's editors were H. H. Hill (died 1916), from 1883 to 1884; Andrew Carr Cameron (1836–1892), from 1884 to 1892; Albert H. McQuilkin, from 1893 to 1917; Harry Hillman, from 1917 to 1928; and J. L. Frazier, from 1928 to about 1938.

When Inland Printer bought The American Printer in November 1958, the combined magazine became The American Printer and Lithographer, among other variants. In January 1982, the title became American Printer. American Printer ceased publication in August 2011. Its last reported circulation was roughly 47,000 subscribers.

== Sources ==
- Laird, Pamela Walker (2001). Advertising Progress: American Business and the Rise of Consumer Marketing. Johns Hopkins University Press. ISBN 0-8018-6645-6. OCLC 255454429.
- Thomson, Ellen Mazur (1997). The Origins of Graphic Design in America, 1870–1920. Yale University Press. ISBN 0-300-06835-2. OCLC 36083665.
- Trewby, Mary, ed. (1989). The Encyclopedia of Arts and Crafts: The International Arts Movement, 1850–1920. E. P. Dutton. ISBN 0-525-24804-8. OCLC 20569563.
