= Maria Asumpta =

Sailing ship

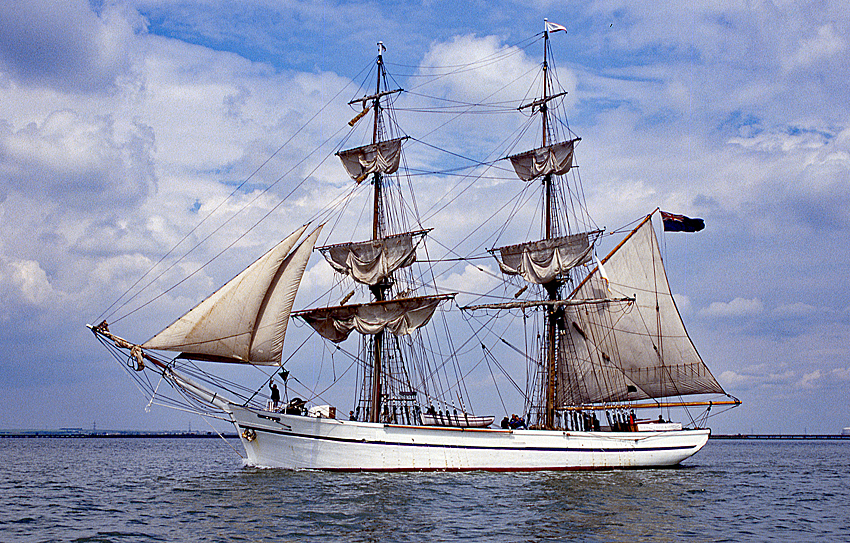
- Maria Asumpta on the Medway in 1991

History
- Name: Maria Asumpta
- Builder: Nicholas Pida
- Launched: Badalona, Spain, 1858
- Christened: Maria Asumpta
- Renamed: Pepita (1930s); Ciudad de Inca (1953); Maria Asumpta (1988)
- Fate: Wrecked at Padstow, Cornwall, 30 May 1995

General characteristics
- Tons burthen: 127 tons
- Length: 123 ft (37 m)
- Beam: 25 ft (7.6 m)
- Draught: 10 ft 6 in (3.20 m)
- Propulsion: Sails, 2 × GEC Dorman 6 LET diesel engines, 175 hp (130 kW) each.
- Sail plan: Brig

Location of the sinking of Maria Asumpta off Cornwall.

Maria Asumpta was a brig that was wrecked in 1995 with the loss of three lives.

== History ==
Maria Asumpta was launched at Badalona in 1858, and was involved in the textile trade between Argentina and Spain; later she was used to transport slaves and salt. In the 1930s an engine was installed, and she was renamed Pepita. With the installation of the engine, her rigging was reduced, and in 1953 she was again renamed, this time Ciudad de Inca. By 1978, she was operating without masts in the Mediterranean. In 1980, her owners wanted to sell her engines and burn the ship. Mark Litchfield and Robin Cecil Wright, who had founded the China Clipper Society, bought the Ciudad de Inca for the value of her engines. Over the next 18 months, the ship was restored, and became a sail training ship in 1982.

== Trapped ==
The sinking of the barque Marques (also owned by Robin Cecil Wright) was the key trigger in a chain of events that embroiled Ciudad de Inca in a legal battle. Litigation filed over the sinking sought to impound under lien all assets of the China Clipper Society, assets which included both Marques and Ciudad de Inca. Consequently, Ciudad de Inca was at risk of being legally impounded, were she to enter American waters.

In mid 1984, Ciudad de Inca participated in the Lake Ontario Tall Ships Rendezvous, an event designed around major port visits to Toronto, Ontario, Rochester, New York, and Kingston, Ontario. While sailing from Toronto to Rochester, the vessel received a radio communication informing the crew of the abrupt legal action in relation to the sinking of Marques. As this could result in the vessel's impoundment in Rochester, the vessel took immediate action to exit from American waters on the south side of Lake Ontario.

At this point, the legal action left Ciudad de Inca essentially trapped in Lake Ontario. The only exit to the sea was by way of the Saint Lawrence Seaway, and since the Seaway had two locks on the American side of the border (Eisenhower Lock and Snell Lock) the risk of impoundment remained. Any attempt to leave the Great Lakes by traversing these locks would have very likely resulted in the Ciudad de Inca being seized.

As a result of the legal action, the vessel needed to find a temporary home port in Canada. So between 1984 and 1988 she was based in Kingston, Ontario, and sailed on the Great Lakes. During the winter in January 1986 she sank in shallow water in Kingston harbour, but was refloated and restored shortly thereafter.

In 1988, she was renamed Maria Asumpta, and ceased to be registered as a sail training ship. Her status now was a private yacht. She was by then the oldest surviving commercial sailing ship. Maria Asumpta later regained her sail training ship status. In 1994, she took part in a tall ships event at Rouen, France.

== Shipwreck ==
The Maria Asumpta was on her first voyage after a refit at Gloucester. The first part of the voyage was hit by bad weather and she had sheltered at Porlock, Lynmouth and Swansea Marina. On the afternoon of 30 May 1995, she was preparing to enter Padstow harbour. The captain, Mark Litchfield, decided to take her between The Mouls and Pentire Point, which was not a route recommended by the Admiralty. Litchfield later stated that the reason for sailing fairly close to shore was to enjoy the view and to benefit from the strong tidal race.

The engines suddenly stopped and two men were sent to attend to it whilst the rest of the crew of fourteen raised more sail. Although lookouts had been posted at the bow, they failed to spot submerged rocks and, about five minutes after the engines stopped, the Maria Asumpta struck rocks at Rump Point 50°35′40″N 4°55′28″W and began to founder. An immediate Mayday was issued. The crew abandoned ship and many of them jumped onto the rocks, but three crew were drowned. The tragedy was witnessed by many sightseers, who had come to watch the Maria Asumpta's arrival.

=== Investigation ===
The Marine Accident Investigation Branch carried out an enquiry into the loss of the Maria Asumpta, and the subsequent report was used in evidence by Mark Litchfield at his trial. (Note: No mention of an investigation in the source cited)

=== Manslaughter trial ===
Litchfield was charged with the manslaughter of the three crew members who died, due to his gross negligence in navigating too close to the shore, knowing that the diesel was contaminated. He pleaded "not guilty".

During the trial, evidence was given that Litchfield put the ship into a dangerous situation by coming too close to a lee shore – a shore with the wind blowing on to it. When the engines stopped the ship was effectively doomed but, had she been further out to sea, she would have been able to avoid the rocks. Litchfield had been advised by the Padstow harbourmaster to stay farther out to sea and had previously been advised at Gloucester that the fuel was contaminated. It also emerged during the trial that Litchfield had previously been the master of the Marques, which had sunk in 1984 with the loss of 19 lives.

At the conclusion of the trial, the jury returned a majority verdict of guilty and Litchfield was jailed for eighteen months by Mr Justice Butterfield. The case is used in teaching gross negligence in law.

Litchfield appealed against his conviction, but his appeal was disallowed.

== Memorial ==
A memorial to the three crew who died in the wreck of Maria Asumpta carved by sculptor Philip Chatfield who was also aboard the ship when it sank was erected in St Enodoc Church, Trebetherick.
