= Wiley-Dondero Canal =

A short seaway on the St. Lawrence Seaway

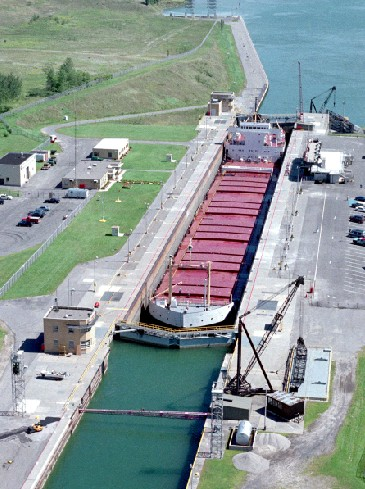
- Ship traversing the Eisenhower Lock
- Interactive map of Wiley-Dondero Canal
- Location: St. Lawrence County, New York
- Country: United States
- Coordinates: 44.97937°N 74.84956°W

Specifications
- Length: 9.2 miles (14.8 km)
- Lock length: 766 feet (233 m)
- Lock width: 80 ft (24 m)
- Maximum boat length: 740 feet (230 m)
- Maximum boat beam: 78 feet (24 m)
- Maximum boat draft: 26.5 feet (8.1 m)
- Locks: 2
- Total rise: 83 feet (25 m)
- Navigation authority: U.S. Army Corps of Engineers

History
- Former names: Long Sault Canal

Geography
- Connects to: St. Lawrence River

The Wiley-Dondero Canal is a section of the St. Lawrence Seaway in New York, United States, with a length of 8 nautical miles (15 km; 9.2 mi).

The United States Army Corps of Engineers planned and supervised the Wiley-Dondero Canal to bypass the Long Sault. Actual construction was performed by Peter Kiewit Sons Co., Morrison-Knudsen Co., Perini Corp., Utah Construction Co., and Walsh Construction Co.

Located near Massena, New York, the seaway provides a total lift of 83 feet (25 m) from the Eisenhower Lock and the Bertrand H. Snell Lock, which are the two locks in the canal.

Originally known as the Long Sault Canal, it was later renamed the Wiley-Dondero Canal. Construction was complicated by the need to avoid interrupting the waterflow to nearby hydroelectric installations.
