= Cornwall Canal =

Canal in Ontario, Canada

Coordinates: 45.00989°N 74.76104°W

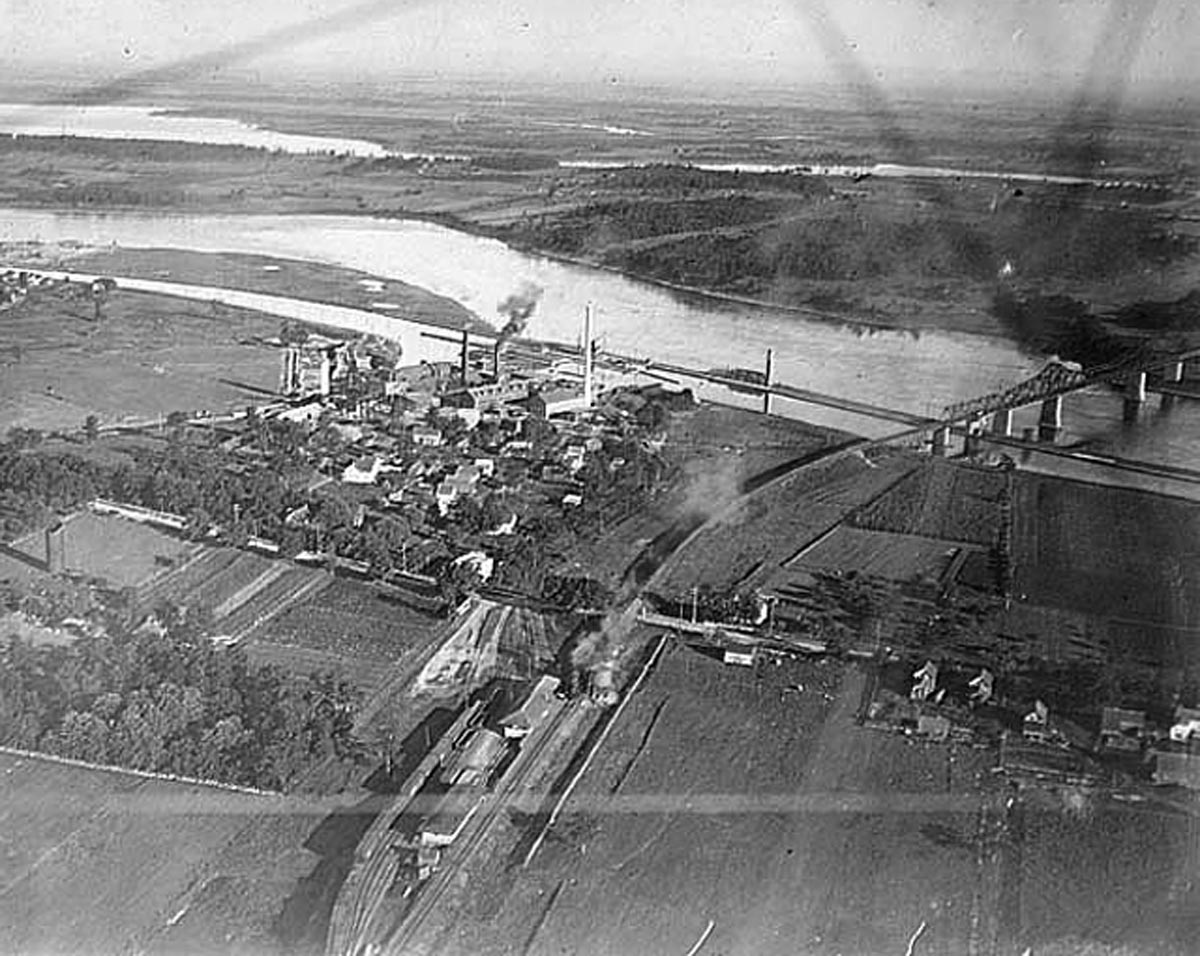
This aerial photo, from 1920, shows the canal paralleling the Saint Lawrence River.

Cornwall Canal

The Cornwall Canal was built by the British government of Canada to bypass a troublesome rapids hindering navigation on the St. Lawrence at Cornwall, Ontario. Construction began in 1834 and was completed in 1843.

== Description ==
The canal extended past the Long Sault rapids from Cornwall, Ontario, to Dickinson's Landing. From the head of the Soulanges Canal to the foot of the canal, there is a stretch of the river through Lake St. Francis of 32 3/4 miles (52.7 km). The length of the canal was eleven miles (18 km). It had six locks that were 270 by 45 feet. The total rise or lockage was 48 feet. The depth of water on the sill was 14 feet. It was 100 feet wide at the bottom and 164 at water surface. It closed in 1968, after becoming obsolete and functionally replaced by the St. Lawrence Seaway and its Wiley-Dondero Canal on the US side of the river. Most was subsequently filled in, helping to create Lamoureux Park. A section still remains as a long body of water stretching to the foot of the Moses Saunders hydro dam revetment.

== See also ==
- Saint Lawrence Seaway
