= Pineglen =

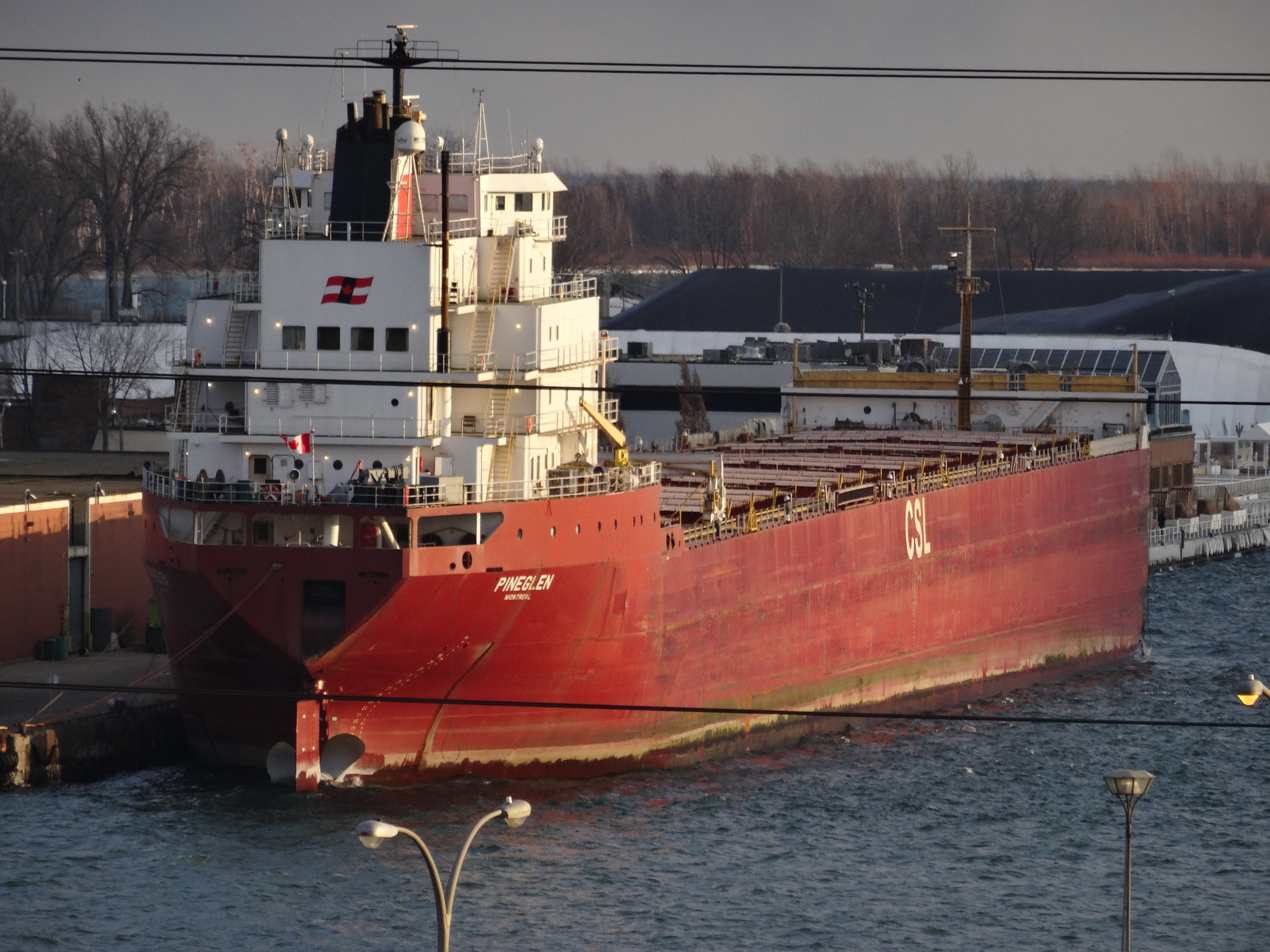
- Pineglen moored in Toronto

History
- Name: Paterson (1985–2002); Pineglen (2002–2017)
- Operator: N.M. Paterson & Sons Limited (1985–2002); Canada Steamship Lines (2002–2017)
- Builder: Collingwood Shipyards, Collingwood
- Yard number: 231
- Launched: 18 April 1985
- Completed: June 1985
- In service: 1985
- Out of service: 2017
- Identification: IMO number: 8409331
- Fate: Sold for scrap, 2017

General characteristics
- Type: Seawaymax Bulk carrier
- Tonnage: 20,370 GT; 32,713 DWT
- Length: 224.5 m (736 ft 7 in) oa; 218.5 m (716 ft 10 in) pp
- Beam: 23.2 m (76 ft 1 in)
- Draught: 8.8 m (28 ft 10 in)
- Installed power: 1 diesel engine
- Propulsion: 1 shaft
- Speed: 13.5 knots (25.0 km/h; 15.5 mph)

Pineglen was a bulk carrier owned and operated by Canada Steamship Lines. She was built at the Collingwood Shipyards, in Collingwood, Ontario in 1985, to a single superstructure lake freighter design. Initially named Paterson, the vessel was sold to Canada Steamship Lines in 2002 and renamed. Unlike more modern lake freighters she was built to a "straight-deck" design – i.e. she was not equipped with a self-unloading boom. The vessel was sold for scrap in 2017.

== Design and description ==
Pineglen was a bulk carrier that was 20,370 gross tonnage (GT) and 32,713 long tons deadweight (DWT) and a 14,534 NT. The vessel was 224.5 metres (736 ft 7 in) long overall and 218.5 metres (716 ft 10 in) long between perpendiculars and had a beam of 23.2 metres (76 ft 1 in). The ship had a maximum draught of 8.8 metres (28 ft 10 in). The vessel had four holds with a net capacity of 42,169 cubic metres (1,489,200 cu ft). She was powered by a single diesel engine, which drove a single variable pitch propeller, which could propel the ship at 13.5 knots (25.0 km/h; 15.5 mph).

== Career ==
The ship was built for N.M. Paterson & Sons Limited, and was the last vessel to be built at the Collingwood Shipyards. The vessel was launched on 18 April 1985 and completed in June. N.M. Paterson operated her as Paterson from her first voyage on 27 June 1985, until March 2002. In 2002 N.M. Paterson sold Paterson and the other two last active vessels in their fleet, Cartierdoc and Mantadoc to Canada Steamship Lines. Following the ship's transfer, the vessel was renamed Pineglen. The vessel mainly carried grain on eastbound voyages and iron ore on westbound voyages.

Pineglen under the command of Captain Feroze Irani was presented with the ceremonial top hat at Lock 3, for being the first vessel to transit the Welland Canal, the westernmost part of the Saint Lawrence Seaway, when it officially opened for its 176th consecutive year of service on 23 May 2005. She was the last vessel to use the Saint Lawrence Seaway in 2007. She was the first vessel to transit Snell Lock in 2012.

In 2017 she was sold for scrap to be broken up in Turkey.
