= Tundra (ship) =

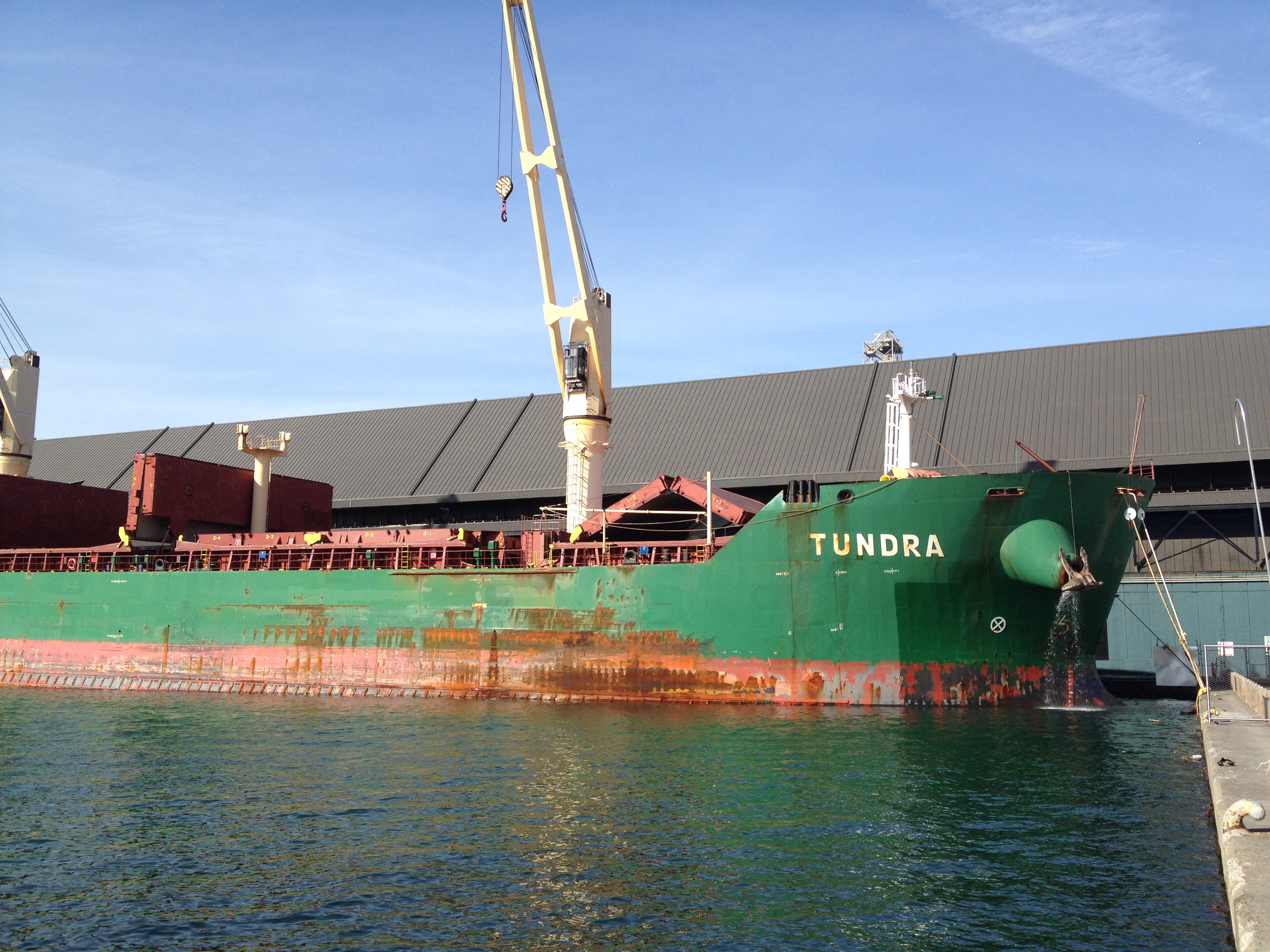
- Tundra moored at the Redpath Sugar Refinery in April 2017

History
- Name: Tundra
- Owner: Navarone SA, Limassol, Cyprus
- Operator: Canadian Forest Navigation Group, Montreal, Canada

General characteristics
- Type: Bulk carrier
- Tonnage: 19,647 GT; 30,930 DWT
- Length: 185 m (607 ft)
- Beam: 23.7 metres (78 ft)
- Draught: 14.6 metres (48 ft)

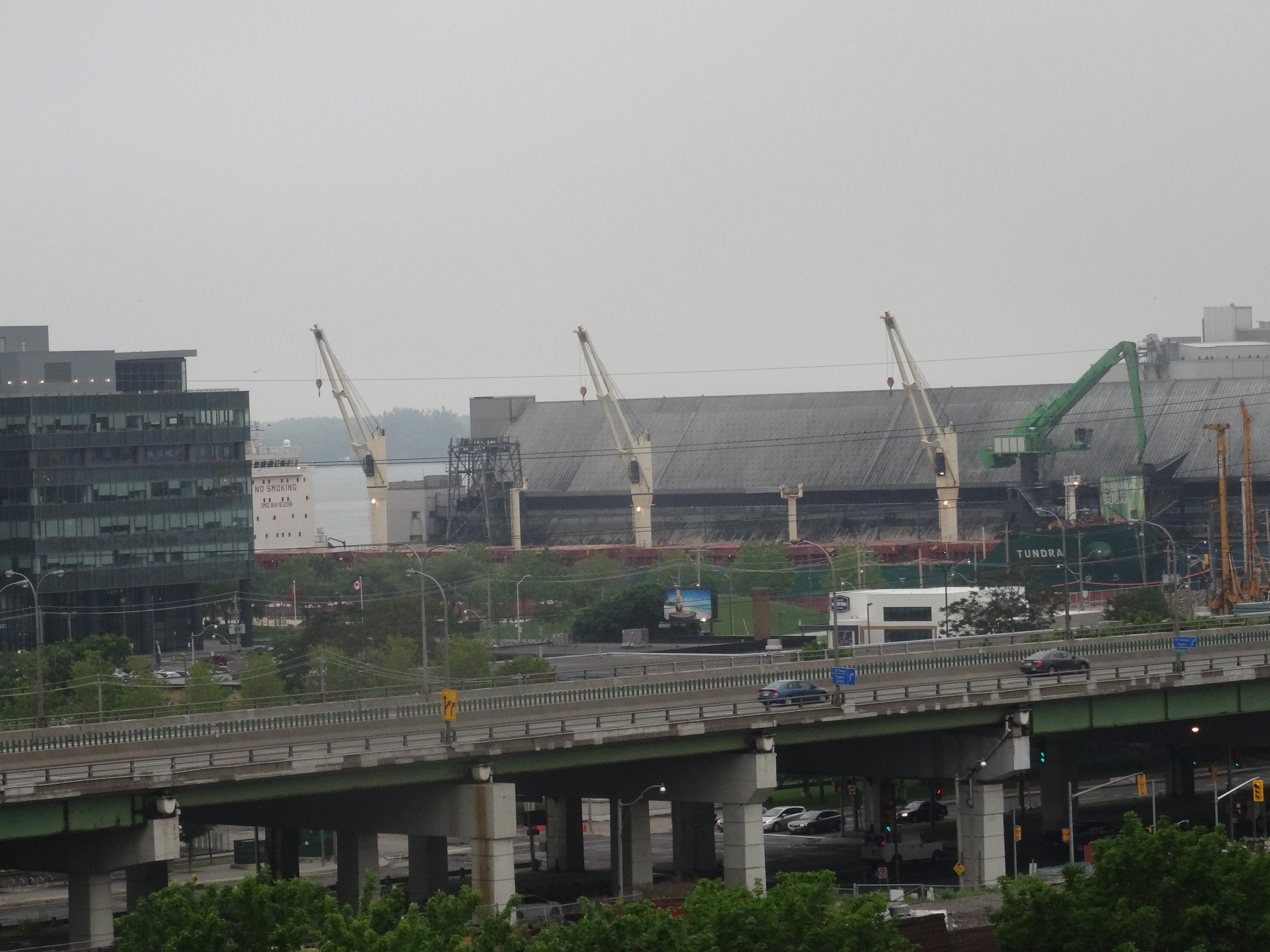
Tundra unloading raw sugar at the Redpath Sugar Refinery on June 14, 2015

Tundra is a bulk carrier. She was launched in 2009. The maritime site boatnerd reports she is operated by Navarone SA of Limassol, Cyprus, and leased to Canfornav Incorporated of Montreal, the Canadian Forest Navigation Group. Marine Link however reports that she is owned by Canfornav.

Early in the morning of June 21, 2015, after delivering a cargo of raw sugar to the Redpath Sugar Refinery in Toronto, she ran aground near the western end of the St Lawrence Seaway.

According to the Times Colonist, following an earlier grounding in the Seaway in 2012, Transportation Safety Board accident investigators concluded there had been "fatigue and ineffective communication between the pilot and bridge officers." Marine Link noted that the 1 am grounding occurred hours after the Seaway was re-opened after the French cruise ship Saint Laurent forced a closure by colliding with the Eisenhower Lock.

Tundra is one of a class of sixteen vessels. Her sister ships include Andean, Barnacle, Blacky, Brant, Chestnut, Labrador, Maccoa, Mottler, Ruddy, Shoveler, Torrent, and Tufty.

== Description ==
Tundra is a bulk carrier that measures 185 metres (607 ft) long with a beam of 23.7 metres (78 ft) and a draught of 14.6 metres (48 ft). The ship has a gross tonnage (GT) of 19,647 and a deadweight tonnage (DWT) of 30,930.
