= Victory I =

Cruise ship built in 2001

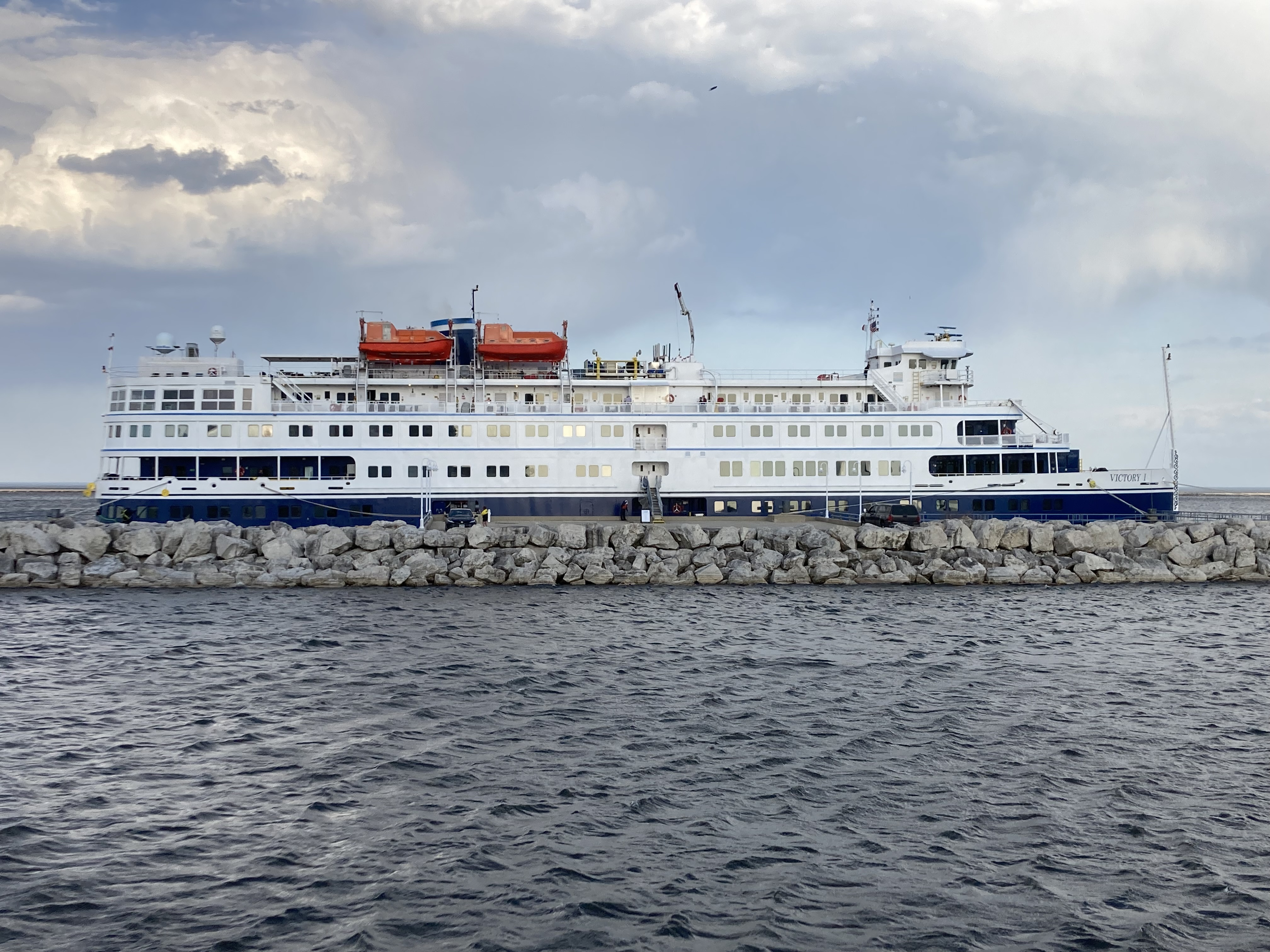
- Cruise ship Victory I at Milwaukee on May 4, 2026

History
- Name: Cape May Light (2001); Sea Voyager (2010); Saint Laurent (2015); Victory I (2016); Ocean Voyager (2021); Victory I (2024)
- Owner: American Queen Voyages
- Operator: Victory Cruise Lines
- Builder: Atlantic Marine, Jacksonville, Florida
- Yard number: 4242
- Laid down: August 1999
- Launched: June 2000
- Completed: April 9, 2001
- In service: 2001
- Identification: IMO number: 9213129
- Status: in active service

General characteristics
- Type: Cruise ship
- Tonnage: 4,954 GT
- Length: 91.4 m (299 ft 10 in) oa; 90.2 m (295 ft 11 in) pp
- Beam: 15.2 m (50 ft)
- Draught: 3.81 m (12 ft 6 in)
- Propulsion: 2 shaft diesel engine
- Speed: 13 knots (24 km/h; 15 mph)
- Capacity: 210 passengers
- Crew: 81

Victory I is a small cruise ship, carrying about 200 passengers. Launched in 2001, she has been operated by four different owners, and was formerly known as Ocean Voyager, Saint Laurent, Sea Voyager and Cape May Light. The ship was built in the United States and entered service in 2001.

== Design and description ==
The ship measures 4,954 gross tonnage (GT) and 200 tons deadweight (DWT). The ship is 91.4 metres (299 ft 10 in) long overall and 90.2 metres (295 ft 11 in) between perpendiculars. The cruise ship has a beam of 15.2 metres (49 ft 10 in) and draught of 3.81 metres (12 ft 6 in).

The ship is powered by a two-shaft diesel engine that gives the ship a maximum speed of 13 knots (24 km/h; 15 mph). Characterized by her owners as a "luxury" vessel, she has a capacity of 210 passengers that are bunked in 105 double staterooms, and are said to have available all the amenities offered on larger vessels.

== Construction and career ==
The vessel was laid down in August 1999 by Atlantic Marine at their Jacksonville, Florida, shipyard. The ship was constructed under the yard number 4242 and was launched in June 2000. Cape May Light was completed on April 9, 2001. Initially named Cape May Light, in 2010 she was renamed Sea Voyager and registered in the United States. In 2011, her registry was changed to Nassau, Bahamas and later that year and in 2015 her named was changed to Saint Laurent.

As Saint Laurent she was owned by the Clipper Group AS, of Copenhagen, Denmark, and operated by the Haimark Line. On June 18, 2015, on the first season she toured the Great Lakes, Saint Laurent collided with the Eisenhower Lock, a canal lock in the Saint Lawrence Seaway. The vessel has a capacity for 210 passengers, and, on the day of the collision, she was carrying 192 passengers, 81 crew, and a local pilot. Twenty-two members of the ship's complement, nineteen passengers and three crew members were slightly injured, and were evacuated. After the collision the vessel took on water, so the lock was completely drained. The collision caused the seaway to be out of commission for 42 hours, and delayed 13 other vessels. Nine hours after the seaway was reopened another vessel, Tundra, ran aground.

The ship was acquired in 2016 as the first vessel of a new line known as Victory Cruise Lines. She underwent a refit, repurposing four of her double cabins, reducing her passenger capacity to 202 from 210. Her sister ship, formerly Cape Cod Light was acquired in 2017, similarly refit, and recommissioned as Victory II. Both vessels and the Victory Cruise Lines brand were acquired by the American Queen Steamboat Company and Victory I underwent a refit at Gulf Island in Houma, Louisiana in 2019, where the vessel's stern was enclosed. During the COVID-19 pandemic Victory I was pulled from service due to the cruising ban. Victory I was laid up at Port Royal, South Carolina.

As part of a rebranding by the American Queen Steamboat Company, (which itself rebranded to American Queen Voyages) on December 7, 2021, Victory I was renamed Ocean Voyager. She underwent a small refit at Port Royal. Ocean Voyager returned to service on January 4, 2022, adding cruises around the Yucatán Peninsula and returning to Great Lakes service in May, making her first stop in Chicago on June 8. On June 20, 2023, American Queen Voyages announced that they would no longer offer cruises on the Great Lakes, and would be selling the Ocean Voyager and Ocean Navigator.

After American Queen Voyages went bankrupt in 2024, the former chief executive officer of the company acquired Ocean Voyager and Ocean Navigator at the company's bankruptcy auction. The two vessels were then made part of the fleet of the recreated Victory Cruise Lines and Ocean Voyager returned to the Victory I name. Victory Cruise Lines resumed cruise service on the Great Lakes in late April 2025.

== See also ==
- Pearl Mist
