= Canadian Forest Navigation Group =

Canadian shipping firm operating bulk carriers

Canadian Forest Navigation (Canfornav) is a Canadian shipping firm. It operates a fleet of close to four dozen bulk carriers. Most of these vessels' voyages are between ports on the North American Great Lakes or the St Lawrence Seaway.

Boat nerd reported in 2002 the firm had employed chartered vessels, in the past. However, because the cost per ton of newly built ships had dropped, they were going to begin ordering newly built vessels.

Canfornav vessels
image	name	launched	notes
	AS Elbia		34,000 tonnes
	Andean	2009	30,000 tonnes
	Barnacle	2009	30,000 tonnes
	Blacky	2008	30,000 tonnes
	Bluebill		37,000 tonnes
	Bluewing		26,000 tonnes
	Brant	2008	30,000 tonnes
	Bufflehead		33,000 tonnes
	Canvasback		34,000 tonnes
	Carme		36,000 tonnes
	Chestnut	2010	30,000 tonnes
	Cinnamon		26,000 tonnes
	Cresty		36,000 tonnes
	Eider	2010	37,000 tonnes
	Emilie	2010	29,800 tonnes, purchased in 2015.
	Gadwall		37,000 tonnes
	Garganey		37,000 tonnes
	Goldeneye		36,000 tonnes
	Greenwing		26,000 tonnes
	Haloise	2010	30,688 tonnes, purchased in 2015
	Harlequin		33,000 tonnes
	Jupiter II		27,000 tonnes
	Labrador	2010	30,000 tonnes
	Maccoa		30,000 tonnes
	Mandarin		26,000 tonnes
	Merganser		33,000 tonnes
	Mottler	2010	30,000 tonnes
	Musky		36,000 tonnes
	Pintail		57,000 tonnes
	Puna		33,000 tonnes
	Redhead		37,000 tonnes
	Redhead		37,000 tonnes
	Ruddy		30,000 tonnes
	Scoter		57,000 tonnes
	Shelduck		34,000 tonnes
	Shoveler		30,000 tonnes
	Silver		33,000 tonnes
	Smew		36,000 tonnes
	Thebe		36,000 tonnes
	Torrent		30,000 tonnes
	Tufty		30,000 tonnes
	Tundra	2009	30,000 tonnes
	Velvet		33,000 tonnes
	Whistler		37,000 tonnes
	Wigeon		37,000 tonnes
	Zeus I		27,000 tonnes
