= Pearl Mist =

Canadian cruise ship

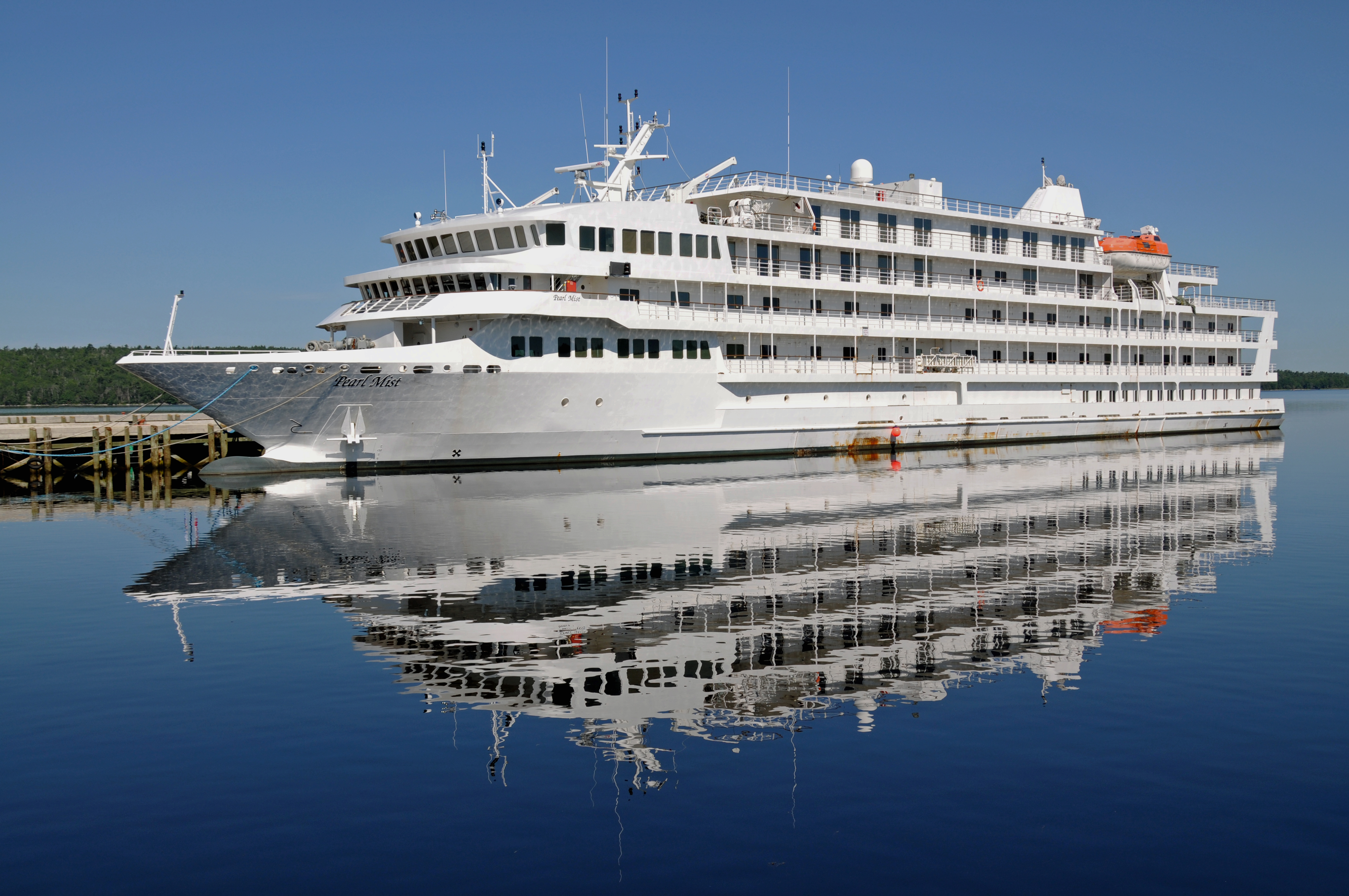
- Pearl Mist docked at Shelburne, Nova Scotia, in Canada on July 31, 2011

History

Marshall Islands
- Name: Pearl Mist
- Operator: Pearl Seas Cruises
- Port of registry: Majuro, Marshall Islands
- Builder: Halifax Shipyards
- Yard number: 6092
- Laid down: 23 July 2007
- Launched: 14 March 2008
- Completed: June 2010
- Identification: IMO number: 9412701; MMSI number: 538003543; Callsign: V7RM9
- Status: in active service

General characteristics
- Type: Cruise ship
- Tonnage: 5,109 GT; 700 DWT
- Length: 99.1 m (325 ft 2 in) oa.; 86.9 m (285 ft 1 in) pp.
- Beam: 16.8 m (55 ft)
- Installed power: Three Caterpillar C18 main generators
- Propulsion: Two Caterpillar 3516C
- Capacity: 210 passengers
- Crew: 70

Pearl Mist is a small cruise ship, built in Halifax, Nova Scotia. After her completion, years of legal dispute delayed her being put into operation, and she did not leave on her inaugural voyage until June 2014. She is currently operated by Pearl Seas Cruises.

== Design and description ==
Pearl Mist is a cruise ship with a gross tonnage of 5,109. The ship is 99.1 metres (325 ft 2 in) long overall and 86.9 metres (285 ft 1 in) between perpendiculars. The vessel has a beam of 16.8 m (55 ft). She can carry 210 passengers with a crew of 70. Pearl Mist was fully renovated in 2023 with a brand new interior design throughout the small ship. The ship's small size is described as a virtue, allowing the vessel to visit small ports that have to be skipped by larger vessels. The Pearl Mist sails the Great Lakes each summer season, as well as the Canadian and New England coastlines, including the St. Lawrence Seaway, in spring and fall. The ship is the only fully stabilized 100% private balcony cruise ship sailing the Great Lakes.

The vessel is described as being outfitted as "luxury", with 105 double rooms, all equipped with an outside balcony. The vessel is equipped with WiFi.

== Service history ==
The Baltimore Sun, reported the vessel was ordered from Irving Shipyards by Pearl Seas Cruises in 2006 for $43.5 million as the first ship built for the cruise line. The keel for Pearl Mist was laid down on 23 July 2007 and that Pearl Seas and Irving began their dispute in 2007, just five months after construction of the vessel began. The vessel was launched on 14 March 2008. The ship was completed in June 2010. However, due to the dispute, Pearl Seas Cruises refused to accept the ship and Pearl Mist was laid up at Shelburne, Nova Scotia to await the outcome of the legal process.

Years of legal battles ended after a United States Federal Appeals court made a ruling in 2013 and a settlement was reached. Pearl Mist was accepted by Pearl Seas Cruises and towed to Baltimore, Maryland in April 2013. The vessel was later taken in hand by Chesapeake Shipbuilding, based in Salisbury, Maryland for fitting out. Pearl Mist made her maiden voyage in June 2014.

In the summers her passengers visited Great Lakes ports. In the winters her passengers visit the Caribbean. In 2016 Pearl Mist started offering excursions that departed from Port Everglades, Florida, on an 11-day circuit of Cuba, visiting Cienfuegos, Trinidad, El Cobre, Santiago de Cuba and Havana.

In January 2018, Pearl Seas Cruises announced a new itinerary for Maine and Bay of Fundy. The Maine and Bay of Fundy circuit is transited in the early spring and late fall.

In 2024, Pearl Seas Cruises introduced several new Great Lakes itnineraries, including a Great Lakes Explorer cruise during which the Pearl Mist sails all 5 of the Great Lakes.

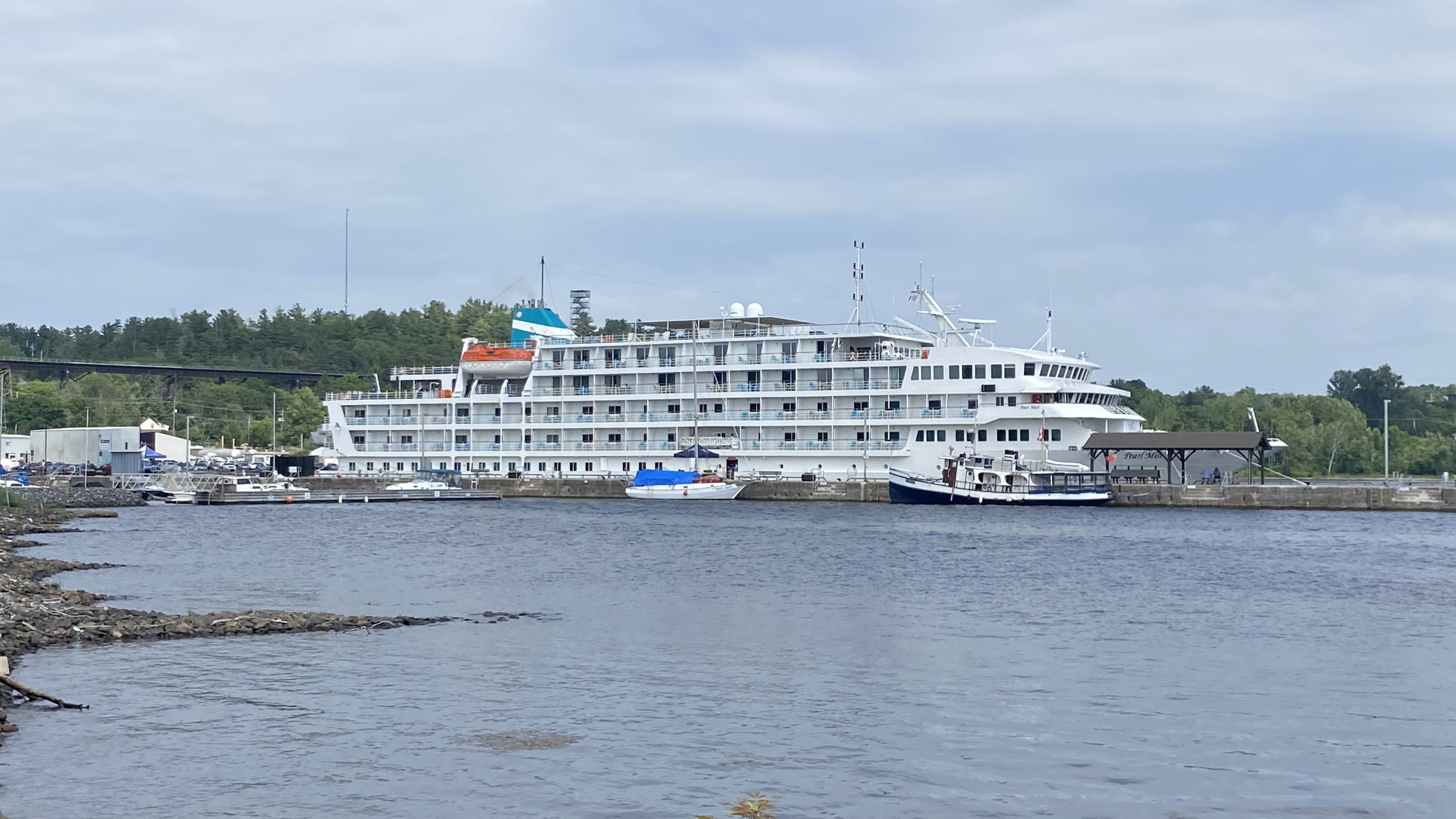
Pearl Mist is docked at Parry Sound, Ontario in Canada on July 5, 2025

== See also ==
- Victory I
