= Melford International Terminal =

Proposed Canadian container terminal

Coordinates: 45°32′1.57″N 61°18′15.83″W

- Location: Middle Melford, Nova Scotia, Canada
- Proposer: Melford International Terminal Inc.
- Project website: melford-terminal.com
- Status: On hold
- Type: Marine container terminal, intermodal logistics park, rail line
- Cost estimate: $300 million (CAD)

Melford International Terminal is a proposed Canadian marine-rail container terminal to be built in the community of Middle Melford in Guysborough County, Nova Scotia.

If constructed, Melford International Terminal would be the closest deep-water marine-rail container terminal in mainland North America to Europe and the Suez Canal.

== Location ==
Located approximately 14 km (8.7 mi) south of the town of Mulgrave, the facility would be located on the western shore of the Strait of Canso partly on public and private property.

== Components ==
The Melford International Terminal proposal includes the following components:

- a 3-berth marine container terminal capable of hosting post/new-Panamax and Malaccamax container vessels
- an intermodal rail facility
- a logistics park
- a 32 km (20 mi) rail spur from the Cape Breton and Central Nova Scotia Railway mainline in the community of Linwood

== Timeline ==
The project was conceived in 2005 when west coast North American container terminals were struggling to clear a massive backlog of freight shipments, largely imports from Asia. The announced conversion of the Fairview Terminal at the Prince Rupert Port Authority is believed to have been the impetus for creating a similar facility in northeastern Nova Scotia.

A search for suitable geography within proximity of existing rail lines highlighted a property known as the "Melford Industrial Reserve." This property is Crown land located in the community of Middle Melford owned by the Government of Nova Scotia which was set aside by its Crown corporation Industrial Estates Limited for industrial development in the 1960s after the Canso Causeway was constructed. In determining the feasibility of extending rail service to the location, it was noted that an abandoned rail corridor connected the nearby town of Mulgrave, which would lessen construction and right of way purchasing costs.

During the facility's design phase, it was noted that a critical part of the area immediately onshore where infilling and pier construction would take place, was privately owned. This resulted in the Municipality of the District of Guysborough forcing the expropriation of private home owners who had lived in the community for generations.

The project received environmental impact assessment approval by the Government of Nova Scotia as well as the Government of Canada in October 2008, at the height of the 2008 financial crisis. Project partners had originally included a major U.S. terminal operator SSA Marine, as well as various shipping lines and financing companies. Following the onset of the global recession and dramatic drop in international shipping, SSA Marine and many other international partners gave up their stake in Melford International Terminal and the project was dormant for much of 2008–2010.

On July 7, 2010, Maher Terminals announced that they had taken an unspecified stake in the Melford Terminal project. Maher Terminals is the designated operator of the Prince Rupert Container Terminal in Prince Rupert, British Columbia on behalf of the Prince Rupert Port Authority. Maher is also the designated operator of the Elizabeth ExpressRail facility in Port Elizabeth, New Jersey on behalf of the Port Authority of New York and New Jersey.

Various timelines for the project have been released by the proponents over the past decade, however, construction has yet to begin.

In 2018 contracts for design work and clearing the land were awarded.

Proponents

Proponents of the Melford facility note the economic development that would benefit economically depressed Guysborough County and the town of Mulgrave.

Opponents

Following the 2005 announcement of the Melford International Terminal, a group of marine infrastructure owners in Sydney, Nova Scotia have developed a competing proposal to dredge Sydney Harbour at an estimated cost of $40 million to accommodate deep draft container ships and build a 2–3 berth container terminal at the Sydport Industrial Park, the former navy base in Point Edward at a cost of $150 million. This proposal would not require construction of a rail line as the location is already served by the Cape Breton and Central Nova Scotia Railway. Prime Minister Stephen Harper visited Sydney in December 2010 where he announced the Government of Canada would contribute $20 million to the Sydney project, on top of a $15 million contribution from the Government of Nova Scotia and $2 million from the municipality and Nova Scotia Power. A contract was signed in April 2011 with Netherlands engineering firm Boskalis for the dredging work in Sydney Harbour to take place in fall 2011.

Shipping industry observers also note that the publicly owned Port of Halifax is a long-established deepwater port with two container terminals located 300 km (160 nmi) southwest of the proposed Melford Terminal and Halifax already has existing CN rail connections to the rest of North America while operating at below 50% capacity. Furthermore, the Port of Halifax has been expanding the piers at both the South End Halifax Container Terminal and the Fairview Cove Container Terminal to accommodate larger ships.

Other opponents include private property owners whose land was expropriated as well as environmentalists.
