= Middle Melford, Nova Scotia =

Community in Nova Scotia, Canada

Coordinates: 45°31′57.24″N 61°18′15.83″W

Middle Melford in Nova Scotia

Middle Melford is a small community in the Canadian province of Nova Scotia, located in the Municipality of the District of Guysborough in Guysborough County.
