= Eisenhower Lock =

Navigational structure is northern New York

Coordinates: 44.97937°N 74.84956°W

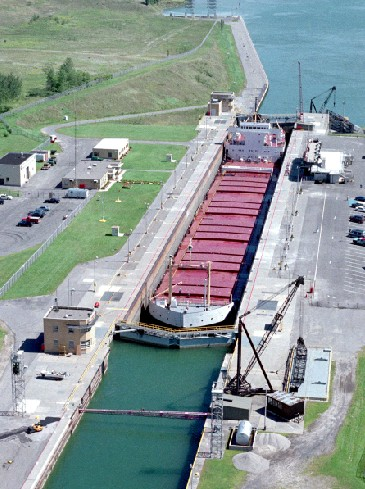

The Eisenhower Lock is one of the seven canal locks on the St Lawrence River leg of the St Lawrence Seaway. This lock provides a 38 foot lift for ships heading upstream. It is one of two locks located near Massena, New York.

The lock was constructed to bypass the portion of the St Lawrence River known as the Long Sault. The US Army Corps of Engineers planned and supervised the construction. Actual construction was performed by Peter Kiewit Sons Co., Morrison-Knudsen Co., Perini Corp., Utah Construction Co., and Walsh Construction Co.

The lock was originally named the "Robinson Bay Lock" and was renamed after President Dwight Eisenhower after his term was over. The lock, and the nearby Bertrand H. Snell Lock are part of the Wiley-Dondero Canal. Construction was complicated by the need to not interrupt the waterflow to nearby hydro-electric installations.

The St. Lawrence Seaway was dedicated on 26 June 1959 at a ceremony in Montreal. Key speakers were President Dwight Eisenhower and Queen Elizabeth II. The following day there was a second dedication ceremony at the Eisenhower Lock. Key attendees were Queen Elizabeth II, Vice President Richard Nixon and New York Governor Nelson Rockefeller.

In 1972 a tanker, the MV Venus, exploded while transiting the lock.

On June 18, 2015, the cruise ship Saint Laurent collided with the lock, causing it to be drained, and closed for almost two days.
