= Bertrand H. Snell Lock =

Lock on the St. Lawrence Seaway

Coordinates: 44.97937°N 74.84956°W

The Bertrand H. Snell Lock is situated on the St Lawrence River leg of the St Lawrence Seaway and is one of the seven canal locks found along the length of the seaway. The lock has a 45 ft (14 m) lift for ships traveling upstream. It is situated near Massena, New York along with one of the other locks.

The lock was constructed parallel to the portion of the St Lawrence River known as the "Long Sault". The US Army Corps of Engineers planned and supervised the construction. Actual construction was performed by Peter Kiewit Sons Co., Morrison-Knudsen Co., Perini Corp., Utah Construction Co., and Walsh Construction Co.

The lock was originally named the "Grasse River Lock" and was renamed after Bertrand Snell after his death. The lock, and the nearby Eisenhower Lock are part of the Wiley-Dondero Canal. Construction was complicated by the need to not interrupt the waterflow to nearby hydro-electric installations.
