= Long Sault =

Former rapids in Ontario, Canada

Coordinates: 45.009°N 74.880°W

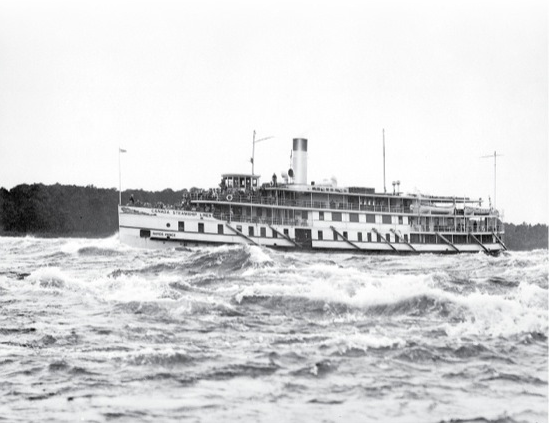
Passenger vessel Rapids Prince runs the Long Sault Rapids.

Former location of the Long Sault rapids

Long Sault was a rapid in the St. Lawrence River upstream and west of Cornwall, Ontario. Sault is the archaic spelling of the French word saut, meaning rapids.

The Long Sault created a navigation barrier along the river for much of its history, motivating the construction of the Moses-Saunders Power Dam, part of the St. Lawrence Seaway, in the 1950s as the size of ships and the volume of shipping traffic along the river began to exceed the capacity of the area's canal locks.

The construction required the flooding of a large swath of land near the rapids to facilitate a hydroelectric dam and to make the rapids area more navigable. The flooded region includes Ontario's Lost Villages.

The Long Sault Parkway takes its name from the rapids.

== See also ==
- Cornwall Canal
- Eisenhower Lock
