= St. Lawrence Seaway =

System of waterways in Canada and the US

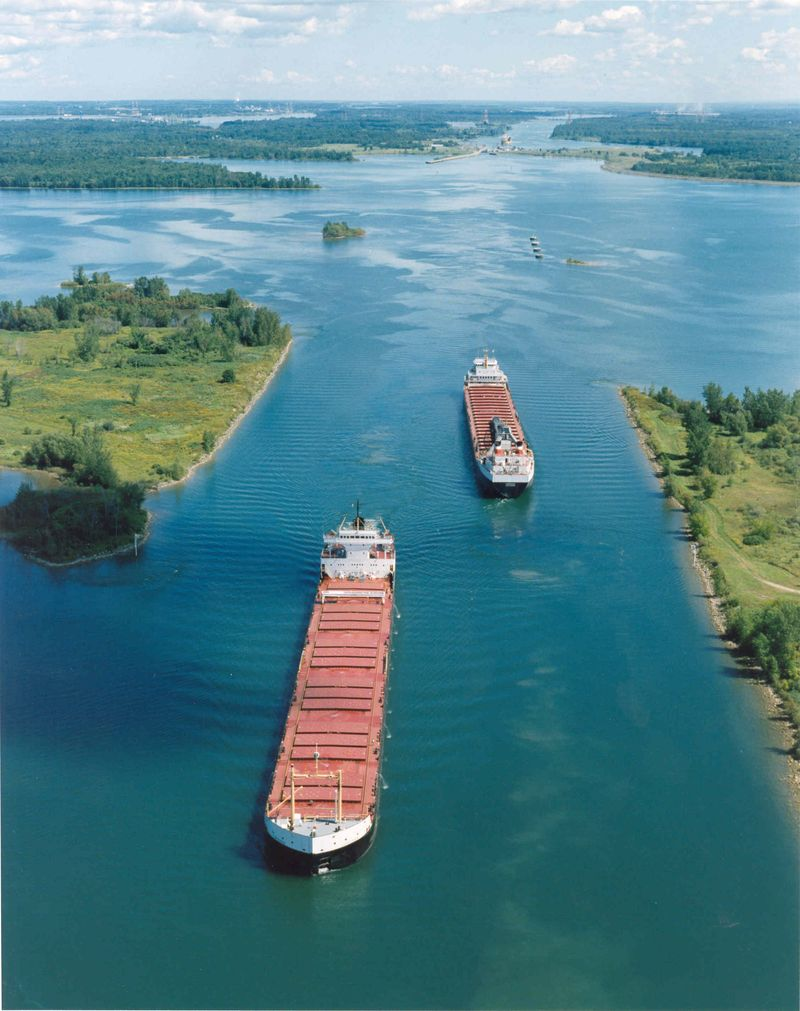
- Interactive map of St. Lawrence Seaway

Specifications
- Length: 370 miles (600 km)
- Maximum boat length: 740 ft 0 in (225.6 m)
- Maximum boat beam: 78 ft 0 in (23.8 m)
- Maximum boat draft: 12.5 m (downstream of Quebec City), 10.7 m (Quebec City to Deschaillons), 11.3 m (Deschaillons to Montreal), 8.2 m (upstream of Montreal)
- Maximum boat air draft: 12 m
- Locks: 15
- Maximum height AMSL: 570 ft (170 m)
- Status: Open

History
- Construction began: 1954
- Date of first use: April 25
- Date completed: 1959

Geography
- Start point: Port Colborne, Ontario
- End point: Montreal, Quebec

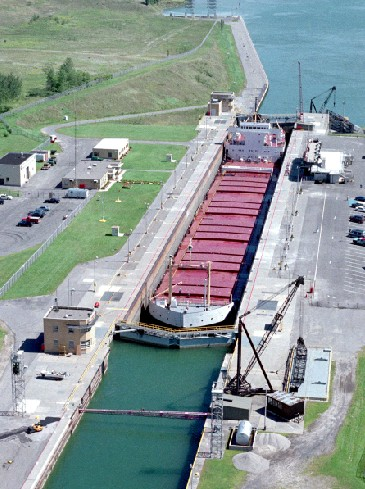
The Eisenhower Locks in Massena, New York

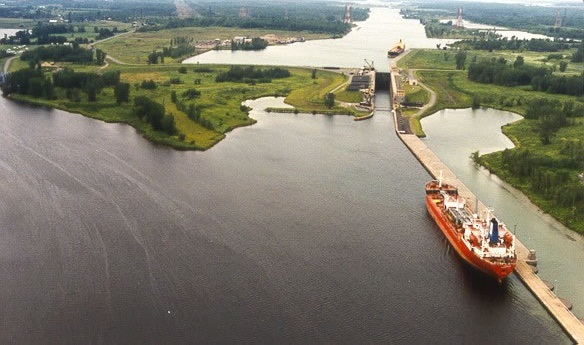
St. Lawrence Seaway

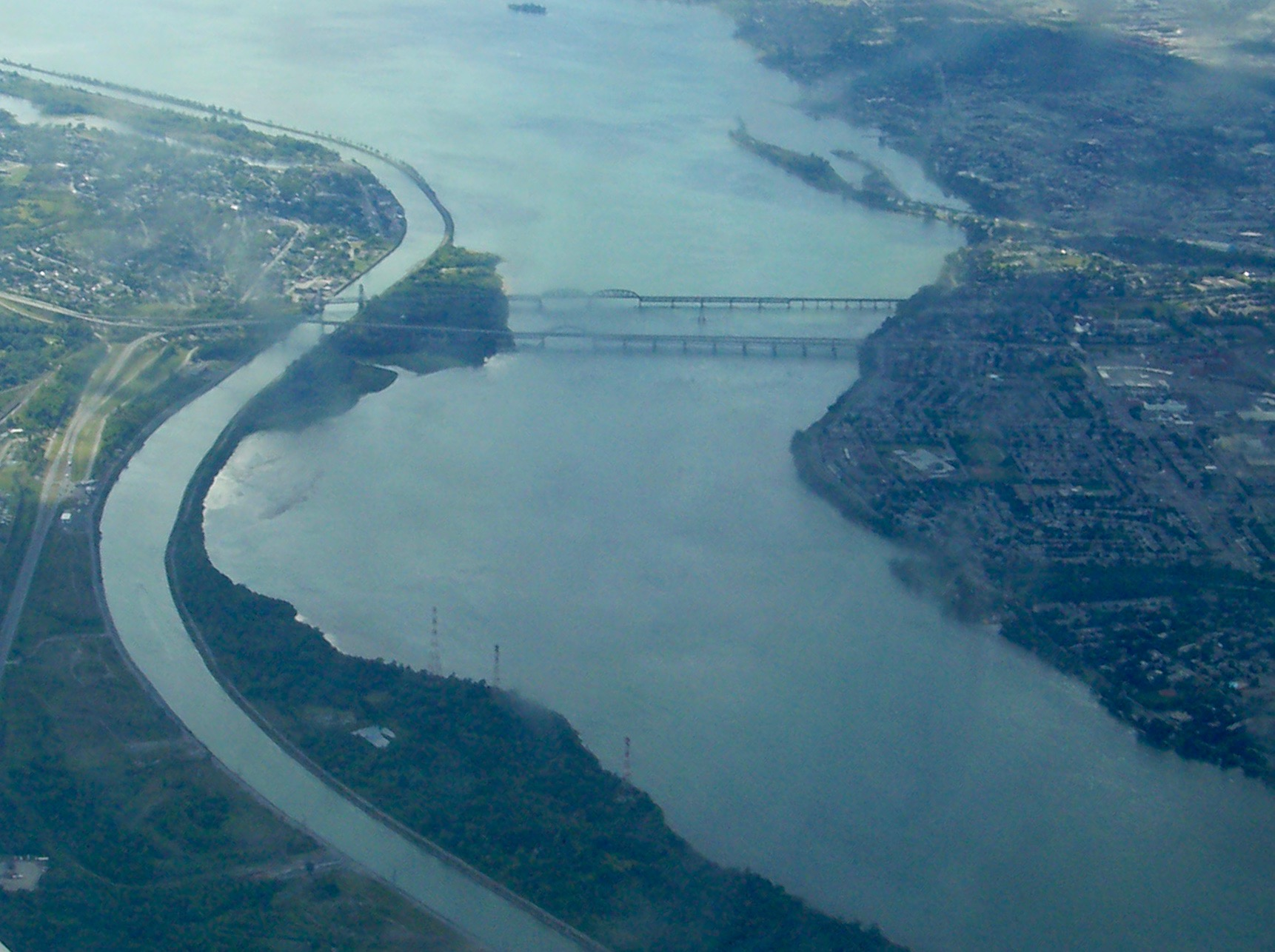
St. Lawrence Seaway separated navigation channel near Montreal

The St. Lawrence Seaway (French: la Voie Maritime du Saint-Laurent) is a system of rivers, locks, canals, and channels in Eastern Canada and the Northern United States that permits oceangoing vessels to travel from the Atlantic Ocean to the Great Lakes of North America, as far inland as Duluth, Minnesota, at the western end of Lake Superior. The seaway is named for the St. Lawrence River, which flows straight from Lake Ontario to the Atlantic Gulf of St. Lawrence. Legally, the seaway extends from Montreal, Quebec, to Lake Erie, and includes the Welland Canal. Ships from the Atlantic Ocean are able to reach ports in all five of the Great Lakes via the Great Lakes Waterway.

The St. Lawrence River portion of the seaway is not a continuous waterway; rather, it consists of several stretches of navigable channels within the river, a number of locks, and canals along the banks of the St. Lawrence River to bypass several rapids and dams. A number of the locks are managed by the St. Lawrence Seaway Management Corporation in Canada, and others in the United States by the Great Lakes St. Lawrence Seaway Development Corporation; the two bodies together advertise the seaway as part of "Highway H_{2}O". The section of the river from Montreal to the Atlantic Ocean is under Canadian jurisdiction, regulated by the offices of Transport Canada in the Port of Quebec.

== History ==
The St. Lawrence Seaway was preceded by several other canals. For example, The Welland Canal opened in 1824, and following improvements completed in 1839, 1887, and 1935, it attained a depth of 7.6 m (25 ft), with locks 233.5 m (766 ft) long by 24.4 m (80 ft) wide. In 1871, locks on the St. Lawrence allowed transit of vessels 186 ft (57 m) long, 44 ft 6 in (13.56 m) wide, and 9 ft (2.7 m) deep. The First Welland Canal, constructed between 1824 and 1829, had a minimum lock size of 110 ft (34 m) long, 22 ft (6.7 m) wide, and 8 ft (2.4 m) deep, but it was generally too small to allow passage of larger oceangoing ships. The Welland Canal's minimum lock size was increased to 150 ft (46 m) long, 26.5 ft (8.1 m) wide, and 9 ft (2.7 m) deep for the Second Welland Canal; to 270 ft (82 m) long, 45 ft (14 m) wide, and 14 ft (4.3 m) deep with the Third Welland Canal; and to 766 ft (233 m) long, 80 ft (24 m) wide, and 30 ft (9.1 m) deep for the current (Fourth) Welland Canal.

The first proposals for a binational comprehensive deep waterway along the St. Lawrence were made in the 1890s. In the following decades, developers proposed a hydropower project as inseparable from the seaway; the various governments and seaway supporters believed the deeper water to be created by the hydro project was necessary to make the seaway channels feasible for oceangoing ships. U.S. proposals for development up to and including the First World War met with little interest from the Canadian federal government. But the two national governments submitted St. Lawrence plans to a group for study. By the early 1920s, both the Wooten-Bowden Report and the International Joint Commission recommended the project.

Although Canada's Liberal prime minister William Lyon Mackenzie King was reluctant to proceed, in part because of opposition to the project in Quebec, in 1932 he and the U.S. representative signed a treaty of intent. This treaty was submitted to the U.S. Senate in November 1932 and hearings continued until a vote was taken on March 14, 1934. The majority voted in favor of the treaty, but it failed to gain the necessary two-thirds vote for ratification. Later attempts between the governments in the 1930s to forge an agreement came to naught due to opposition by the Ontario government of Mitchell Hepburn and the government of Quebec. In 1936, John C. Beukema, head of the Great Lakes Harbors Association and a member of the Great Lakes Tidewater Commission, was among a delegation of eight from the Great Lakes states to meet at the White House with U.S. president Franklin D. Roosevelt to obtain his support for the seaway concept.

Beukema and St. Lawrence Seaway proponents were convinced a nautical link would lead to the development of the communities and economies of the Great Lakes region by permitting the passage of oceangoing ships. In this period, exports of grain, along with other commodities, to Europe were an important part of the national economy. Negotiations on the treaty resumed in 1938, and by January 1940 substantial agreement was reached between Canada and the United States. By 1941, President Roosevelt and Prime Minister Mackenzie King made an executive agreement to build the joint hydro and navigation works, but this failed to receive the assent of the U.S. Congress. Proposals for the seaway were met with resistance; the primary opposition came from interests representing harbors on the Atlantic and Gulf Coasts and internal waterways and from the railroad associations. The railroads carried freight and goods between the coastal ports and the Great Lakes cities.

After 1945, proposals to introduce tolls to the seaway were not sufficient to gain support for the project by the U.S. Congress. Growing impatient, and with Ontario desperate for the power to be generated by hydroelectricity, Canada began to consider developing the project alone. This seized the imagination of Canadians, engendering a groundswell of nationalism around the St. Lawrence. On September 28, 1951, Canadian prime minister Louis St. Laurent advised U.S. president Harry S. Truman that Canada was unwilling to wait for the United States and would build a seaway alone; the Canadian Parliament authorized the founding of the St. Lawrence Seaway Authority on December 21 of that year. Fueled by this support, Saint Laurent's administration decided during 1951 and 1952 to construct the waterway alone, combined with the Moses-Saunders Power Dam. (This became the joint responsibility of Ontario and New York: as a hydropower dam would change the water levels, it required bilateral cooperation.)

The International Joint Commission issued an order of approval for joint construction of the dam in October 1952. U.S. Senate debate on the bill began on January 12, 1953, and the bill emerged from the House of Representatives Committee of Public Works on February 22, 1954. It received approval from the Senate and the House by May 1954. The first positive action to enlarge the seaway was taken on May 13, 1954, when U.S. president Dwight D. Eisenhower signed the Wiley-Dondero Seaway Act to authorize joint construction and establish the St. Lawrence Seaway Development Corporation as the U.S. authority. The need for cheap haulage of Quebec-Labrador iron ore was one of the arguments that finally swung the balance in favor of the seaway. Groundbreaking ceremonies took place in Massena, New York, on August 10, 1954. That year Eisenhower appointed Beukema to the five-member St. Lawrence Seaway Advisory Board.

In May 1957, the Connecting Channels Project was begun by the United States Army Corps of Engineers. By 1959, Beukema was on board the U.S. Coast Guard cutter Maple for the first trip through the U.S. locks, which opened up the Great Lakes to oceangoing ships. On April 25, 1959, large, deep-draft ocean vessels began streaming to the heart of the North American continent through the seaway, a project supported by every administration from Woodrow Wilson through Eisenhower.

In the United States, N. R. Danelian, worked with the U.S. Secretary of State on Canadian-U.S. issues regarding the seaway, persevering through 15 years to gain passage by the U.S. Congress of the Seaway Act. He later became president of the Great Lakes St. Lawrence Association to promote seaway development to benefit the American heartland. The seaway was heavily promoted by the Eisenhower administration, which had been concerned with a lack of US control.

The seaway opened in 1959 and cost C$470 million, $336.2 million of which was paid by the Canadian government. Elizabeth II, Queen of Canada, Prime Minister John Diefenbaker, and President Eisenhower formally opened the seaway on June 26, 1959, with a short cruise aboard the royal yacht HMY Britannia after addressing crowds in Saint-Lambert, Quebec. 22,000 workers were employed at one time or another on the project, a 3,700-kilometre-long (2,300 mi) superhighway for ocean freighters. Port of Milwaukee director Harry C. Brockel forecast just before the Seaway opened in 1959 that "The St. Lawrence Seaway will be the greatest single development of this century in its effects on Milwaukee's future growth and prosperity." Lester Olsen, president of the Milwaukee Association of Commerce, said, "The magnitude and potential of the St. Lawrence Seaway and the power project stir the imagination of the world."

Several commemorative envelopes and stamps were available when the Seaway opened :

Al Boerger 1st day Commemorative envelope of St Lawrence Seaway

Commemorative envelopes from opening of St. Lawrence Seaway

The seaway's opening is often credited with making the Erie Canal obsolete and causing the severe economic decline of several cities along the canal in Upstate New York. But by the turn of the 20th century, the Erie Canal had already been largely supplanted by the railroads, which had been constructed across New York and could carry freight more quickly and cheaply. Upstate New York's economic decline was precipitated by numerous factors, only some of which had to do with the St. Lawrence Seaway.

Under the Canada Marine Act (1998), the Canadian portions of the seaway were set up with a non-profit corporate structure; this legislation also introduced changes to federal ports.

According to Transport Canada in 2025, the seaway is responsible for C$46.8 billion of "economic activity" in both Canada and the U.S and in 2024, 37 million tons of cargo was moved through it.

Great Lakes and seaway shipping generated $3.4 billion in business revenue annually in the United States according to a 2005 report. In 2002, ships moved 222 million tonnes of cargo through the seaway. Overseas shipments, mostly of inbound steel and outbound grain, accounted for 15.4 million tonnes, or 6.9%, of the total cargo moved. In 2004, seaway grain exports accounted for about 3.6% of U.S. overseas grain shipments, according to the U.S. Grains Council. In a typical year, seaway steel imports account for around 6% of the U.S. annual total. The toll revenue obtained from ocean vessels is about 25–30% of cargo revenue.

International changes have affected shipping through the seaway. Europe is no longer a major grain importer; large U.S. export shipments are now going to South America, Asia, and Africa. These destinations make Gulf and West Coast ports more efficient than accessing the North Atlantic. In 2004 the Port of Duluth shipped barely over 2.5 million tonnes of grain, a amount lower than it did just before 1959 when the seaway opened Lake Superior to deep-draft oceangoing vessels. Referring to the seaway project, a retired Iowa State University economics professor who specialized in transportation issues said, "It probably did make sense, at about the time it (the Seaway) was constructed and conceived, but since then everything has changed."

Certain seaway users have been concerned about the low water levels of the Great Lakes that had been recorded between 2010 and 2016.

== Expansion proposal ==
Comparison of bounding box of Panamax and Seawaymax

The Panama Canal was completed in 1914 and also serves oceangoing traffic. In the 1950s, seaway designers chose not to build the locks to match the size of ships permitted by the 1914 locks at the Panama Canal (965 by 106 feet, 294 by 32 m, known as the Panamax limit). Instead, the seaway locks were built to match the smaller locks of Welland Canal, which opened in 1932. The seaway locks permit passage of a ship 740 feet (230 m) long by 78 feet (24 m) wide (the Seawaymax limit).

The U.S. Army Corps of Engineers conducted a study to expand the St. Lawrence Seaway, but the plan was scrapped in 2011 because of budgetary issues.

== Locks in the St. Lawrence River ==
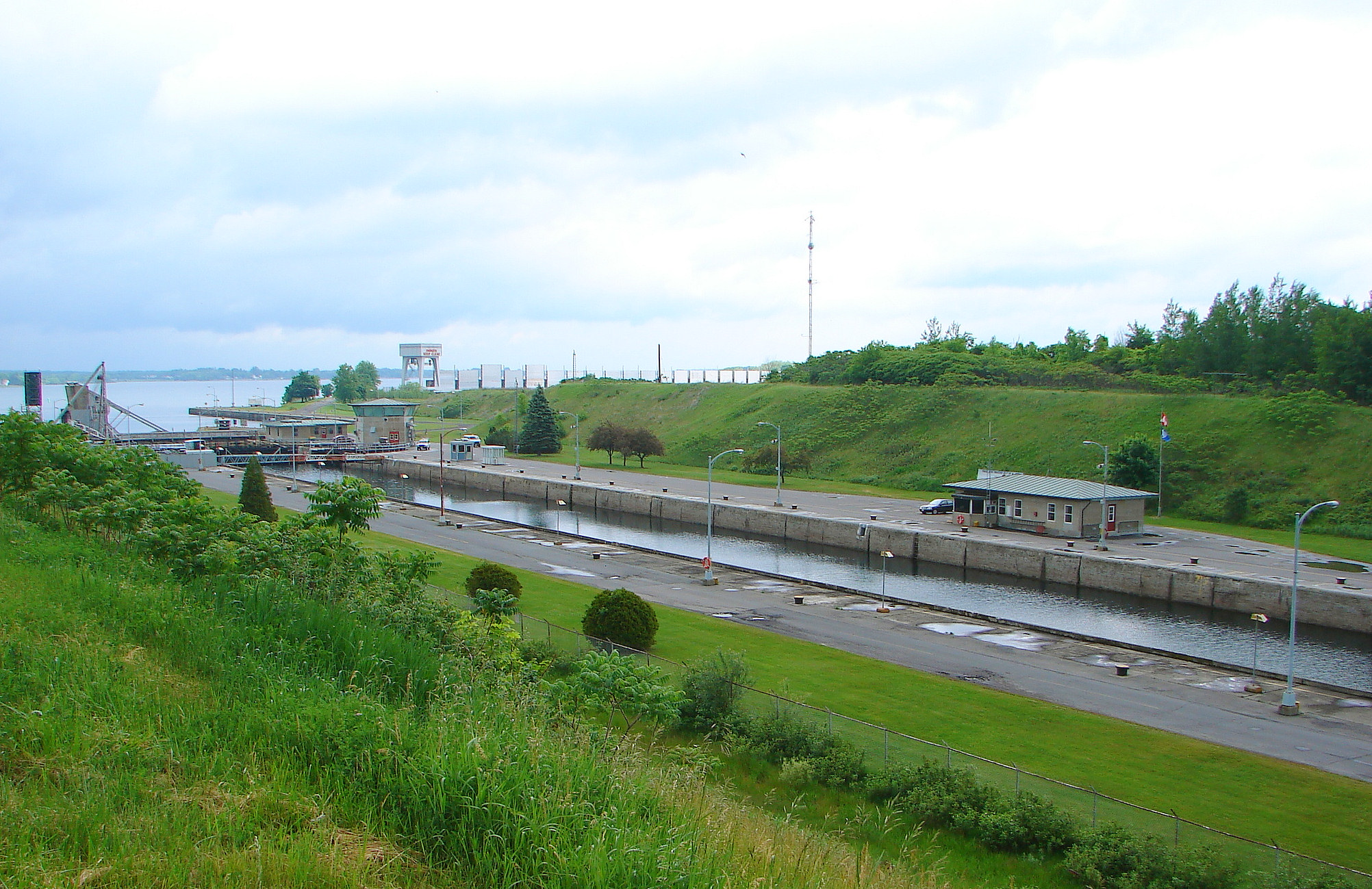
Iroquois Locks

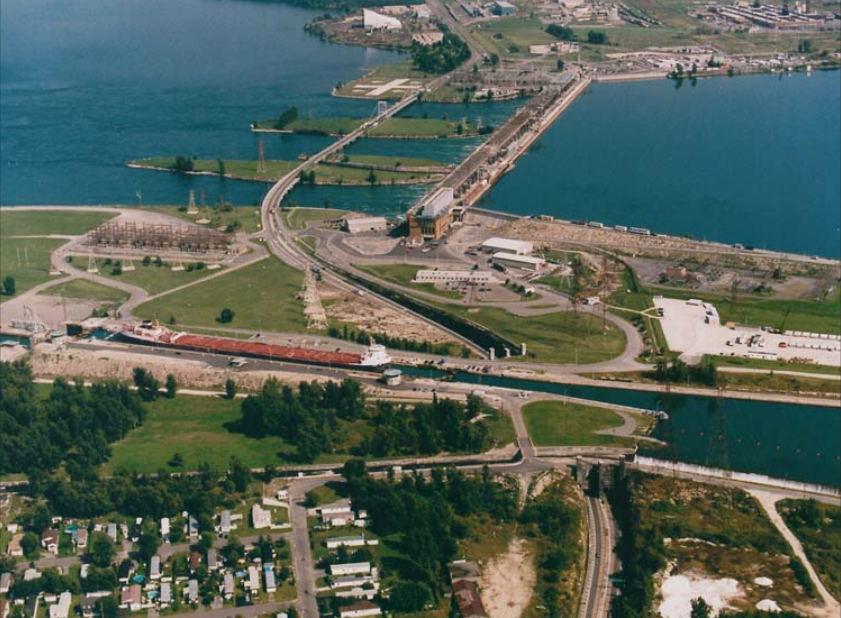
Beauharnois Lock

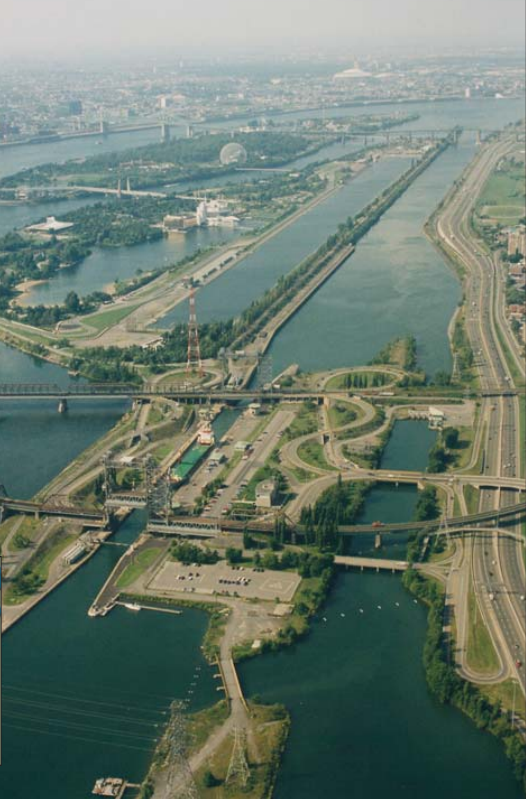
St. Lambert Lock

There are seven locks in the St. Lawrence River portion of the seaway. From downstream to upstream they are:

1. St. Lambert Lock—Saint Lambert, QC
2. Côte Ste. Catherine Lock—Sainte-Catherine, QC
3. Beauharnois Locks (two locks)—Melocheville, QC, at 45°18′12.6″N 73°55′36.5″W and 45°19′0.1″N 73°55′6.6″W
4. Bertrand H. Snell Lock—Massena, NY
5. Eisenhower Lock—Massena, NY
6. Iroquois Lock—Iroquois, ON, at 44°49′48″N 75°18′46.8″W

Water Level Elevations:

- Lake Ontario is 243 ft (74.1 m) above sea level.
- The drop through Iroquois Lock is 1 ft (0.3 m).
- Lake St. Lawrence is 242 ft (73.8 m) above sea level.
- The drop through Eisenhower Lock is 38 ft (11.6 m).
- The Wiley-Dondero Canal is 204 ft (62.2 m) above sea level.
- The drop through Snell Lock is 45 ft (13.7 m).
- Lake St. Francis is 159 ft (48.5 m) above sea level .
- The drop through Upper Beauharnois Lock is 41 ft (12.5 m).
- The Beauharnois Canal is 118 ft (36.0 m) above sea level.
- The drop through Lower Beauharnois Lock is 41 ft (12.5 m).
- Lake St. Louis is 77 ft (23.5 m) above sea level.
- The drop through Côte Ste. Catherine Lock is 30 ft (9.1 m).
- Laprairie Basin is 47 ft (14.3 m) above sea level.
- The drop through St. Lambert Lock is 15 ft (4.6 m).
- The drop through the Lachine Rapids is a few feet.
- Montreal Harbour is approximately 30 ft (9.1 m) above sea level.

== Locks in the Welland Canal ==
There are eight locks on the Welland Canal. From the north to the south, there is lock 1 at Port Weller, followed by Lock 2 and then Lock 3, a site with a visitors' information centre and museum in St. Catharines, Ontario. There are four locks in Thorold, Ontario, including twin-flight locks 4, 5 and 6, with Lock 7 leading up to the main channel. The Lake Erie level control lock sits in Port Colborne, Ontario.

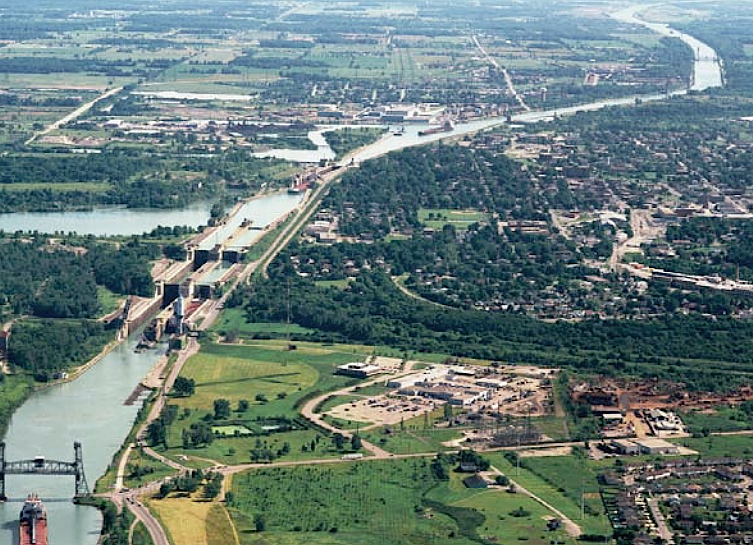
Locks 4, 5, 6, & 7 on the Welland Canal

== Lock, channel dimensions, and additional statistical data ==
The size of vessels that can traverse the seaway is limited by the size of the locks. Those on the St. Lawrence and the Welland Canal are 766 ft (233.5 m) long, 80 ft (24.4 m) wide, and 30 ft (9.14 m) deep. The maximum allowed vessel size is slightly smaller: 740 ft (225.6 m) long, 78 ft (23.8 m) wide, and 26.5 ft (8.1 m) deep. After the opening of the seaway, many vessels designed for use on the Great Lakes were built to the maximum size permissible by the locks, known informally as Seawaymax or Seaway-Max. Large vessels of the lake freighter fleet are built on the lakes and cannot travel downstream beyond the Welland Canal. On the remaining Great Lakes, these ships are constrained only by the largest lock on the Great Lakes Waterway, the Poe Lock at the Soo Locks (at Sault Ste. Marie), which is 1,200 ft (365.8 m) long, 110 ft (33.5 m) wide, and 32 ft (9.8 m) deep.

A vessel's draft is another obstacle to its passage on the seaway, particularly in connecting waterways such as the St. Lawrence River. The depth in the seaway's channels is 41 ft (12.5 m) (Panamax depth) downstream of Quebec City, 35 ft (10.7 m) between Quebec City and Deschaillons, 37 ft (11.3 m) to Montreal, and 27 ft (8.2 m) upstream of Montreal. Channel depths and limited lock sizes mean that only 10% of current oceangoing ships, which have been built much larger than in the 1950s, can traverse the entire seaway. Proposals to expand the seaway, dating from as early as the 1960s, have been rejected since the late 20th century as too costly. In addition, researchers, policy makers, and the public are much more aware of the environmental issues that have accompanied seaway development and are reluctant to open the Great Lakes to more invasions of damaging species, as well as associated issues along the canals and river. Questions have been raised as to whether such infrastructure costs could ever be recovered. Lower water levels in the Great Lakes have also posed problems for some vessels in recent years, and pose greater issues to communities, industries, and agriculture in the region.

While the seaway is (as of 2010) mostly used for shipping bulk cargo, the possibility of its use for large-scale container shipping is under consideration as well. If the expansion project were to go ahead, feeder ships would take containers from the port of Oswego on Lake Ontario in upstate New York to Melford International Terminal in Nova Scotia for transfer to larger oceangoing ships.

The Great Lakes St. Lawrence Seaway System website used to host measurements of wind, water, levels and water temperatures. A real-time interactive map of seaway locks, vessels, and ports used to be available at the same website. The United States' National Oceanic and Atmospheric Administration-funded Great Lakes Water Level Dashboard compiles statistics on water depth at various points along the seaway.

== Ecology ==
To create a navigable channel through the Long Sault rapids and to allow hydroelectric stations to be established immediately upriver from Cornwall, Ontario, and Massena, New York, Lake St. Lawrence was created behind a dam. This required the condemnation and acquisition by the government of all the properties of six villages and three hamlets in Ontario; these are now collectively known as The Lost Villages. The area was flooded beginning on July 1, 1958, creating the lake. There was also inundation on the New York side of the border, and the village of Louisville Landing was submerged.

A notable adverse environmental effect of the operation of the seaway has been the introduction of numerous invasive species of aquatic animals into the Great Lakes Basin. The zebra mussel has been most damaging in the Great Lakes and through its invasion of related rivers, waterways, and city water facilities. Invasive species and artificial water level controls imposed by the seaway have had a negative impact on recreational fishing.

The seaway, along with the St. Lawrence River it passes through, also provides opportunities for outdoor recreation, such as boating, camping, fishing, and scuba diving. Of note, the Old Power House near Lock 23 (near Morrisburg, Ontario) became an attractive site for scuba divers. The submerged stone building has become covered with barnacles and is home to an abundance of underwater life. The seaway passes through the St. Lawrence River, which provides a number of diveable shipwrecks within recreational scuba limits (shallower than 130 ft (40 m)). The region also offers technical diving, with some wrecks lying at 240 ft (73 m). The water temperature can be as warm as 75 °F (24 °C) during the mid- to late-summer months. The first 10 ft (3 m) of Lake Ontario is warmed and enters the St. Lawrence River, as the fast-moving water body has no thermocline circulation.

On July 12, 2010, Richelieu (owned by Canada Steamship Lines) ran aground after losing power near the Côte-Sainte-Catherine lock. The grounding punctured a fuel tank, spilling an estimated 200 tonnes (440 thousand pounds) of diesel fuel, covering approximately 500 square metres (5,400 sq ft). The seaway and lock were shut down to help contain the spill.

== International trade and tourism ==
The seaway is important for American and Canadian international trade. It handles 40–50 million annual tonnes of cargo. About 50% of this cargo carried travels to and from international ports in Europe, the Middle East, and Africa. The rest comprises coastal trade, or short sea shipping, between various American and Canadian ports. Among international shippers are found:

- Polsteam, which maintains a fleet of dry-bulk only vessels that transit every two weeks from the Dutch town of IJmuiden to Duluth, Minnesota
- Fednav Group, a private international dry-bulk only ocean transportation group, with routes between the Port of Antwerp and Sorel, Quebec, even in wintertime
- World Shipping Inc., a privately owned global logistics operation
- Canfornav, a subsidiary of Canfor, which does dry bulk only and registers most of its vessels in Cyprus
- American Steamship Company, a subsidiary of the General American Transportation Corporation (GATX)
- Rand Logistics, which was formed from the acquisition of Lower Lakes Towing Ltd, and does not ship containers
- McKeil Marine, headquartered in Hamilton, which provides service to Arctic ports
- Groupe Desgagnés,
- The Port of Montreal is the site of operations of
  - Maersk Line, a unit of the A.P. Moller-Maersk Group
  - Mediterranean Shipping Company
  - Compagnie Maritime d'Affrètement / Compagnie Generale Maritime, a French transshipper
  - Hapag-Lloyd acquired the Port of Montreal docks of, along with the rest of, CP Ships in 2005
  - Orient Overseas Container Line, a Hong Kong-based multinational
- Armitage Quebec which has stevedoring operations in Baie-Comeau, Becancour, Chicago, Cote-Sainte-Catherine, Gaspe, Gros-Cacouna, Hamilton, Matane, Oshawa, Pointe-au-Pic, Port Colborne, Portneuf, Quebec, Rimouski, Saguenay, Sept-Iles, Sorel-Tracy, St. Catharines, and other ports in the Maritime provinces of Canada.

The St. Lawrence Seaway (along with ports in Quebec) is the main route for Ontario grain exports to overseas markets. Its fees are publicly known, and were limited in 2013 to an increase of 3%. A trained pilot is required for any foreign trade vessel. A set of rules and regulations are available to help transit.

Commercial vessel transit information is hosted on the Great Lakes St. Lawrence Seaway Development Corporation website.

Since 1997, international cruise liners have been known to transit the seaway. The Hapag-Lloyd Christopher Columbus carried 400 passengers to Duluth, Minnesota, that year. Since then, the number of annual seaway cruising passengers has increased to 14,000.

Every year, more than 2,000 recreational boats, of more than 20 ft and one ton, transit the seaway. The tolls have been fixed for 2017 at $30 per lock. There is a $5 per lock discount for payment in advance. Lockages are scheduled 12 hours a day between the hours of 07:00 and 19:00 from June 15 to September 15.

A list of organisations that serve the seaway in some fashion, such as chambers of commerce and municipal or port authorities, is available at the SLSDC website. A 56-page electronic "Great Lakes St. Lawrence Seaway System" Directory is published by Harbor House Publishers.

== Map ==
Map of the North American Great Lakes and the St. Lawrence Seaway from 1959, depicting the entire length beginning at the Gulf of St. Lawrence in the east to the westernmost terminus at Lake Superior.

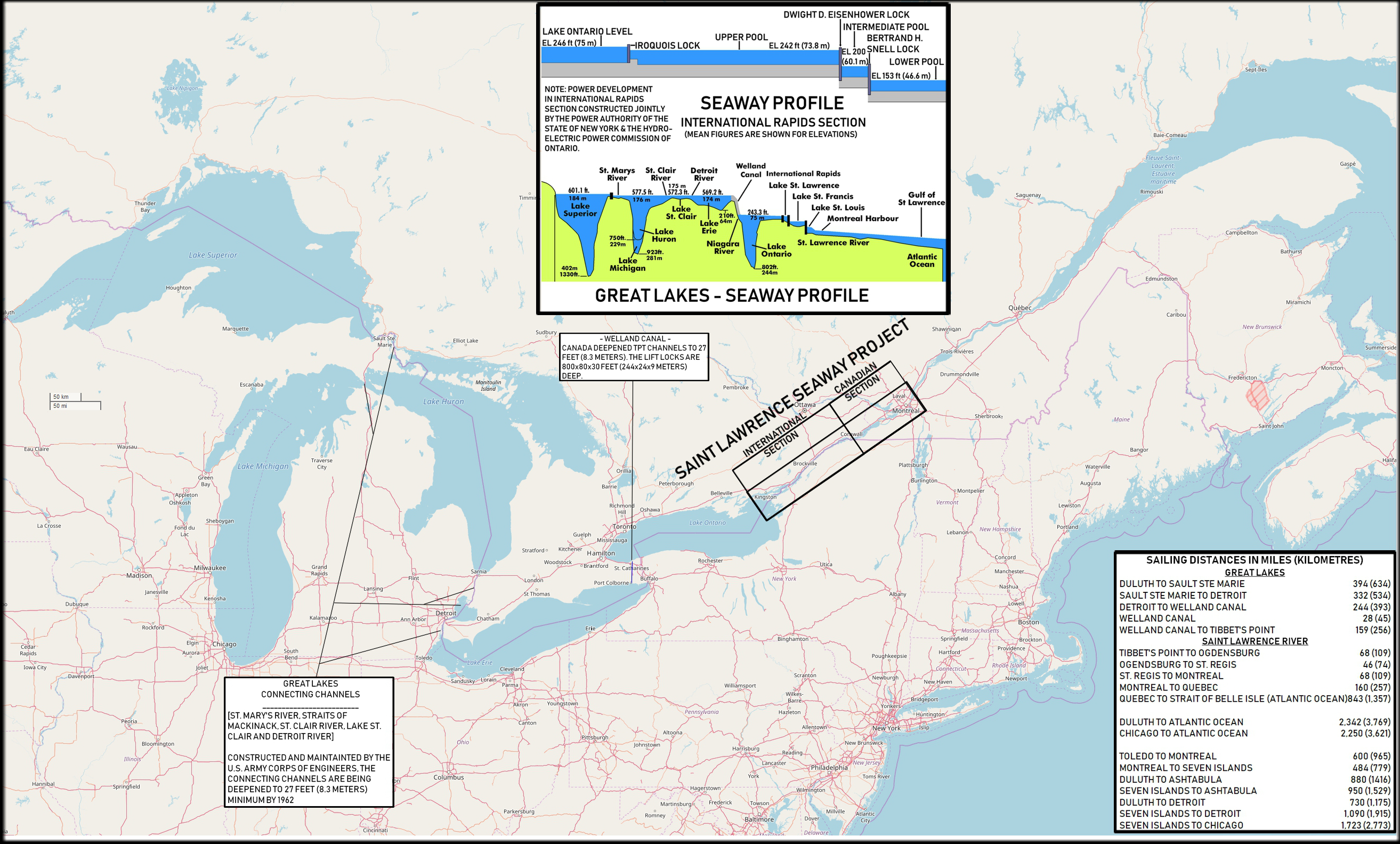

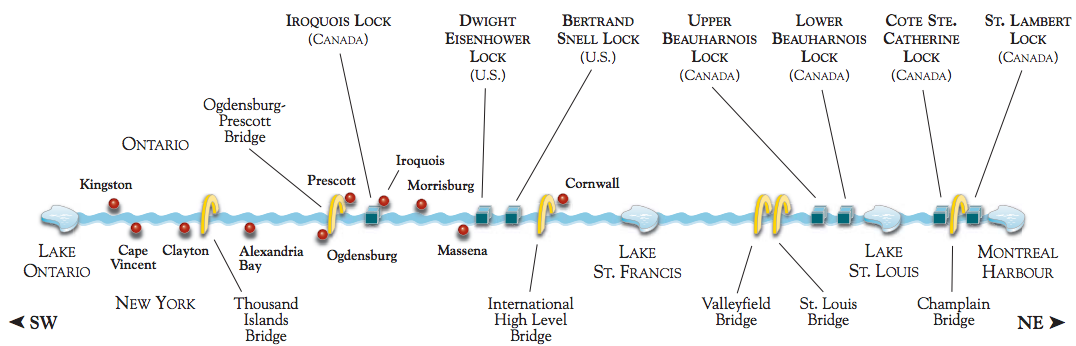
Thousand Islands Bridge, Ogdensburg-Prescott International Bridge, Seaway International Bridge, Valleyfield Bridge, St. Louis Bridge, Champlain Bridge Lake Ontario, Lake Saint Francis, Lake Saint-Louis, Montreal Harbour

== See also ==
- Great Lakes Waterway
- Lachine Canal
- Lake Champlain Seaway
- Merchant vessel
- Navigability
- Ship transport
- Soo Locks
- Soulanges Canal
- Watercraft
- Waterway
