= List of county routes in St. Lawrence County, New York =

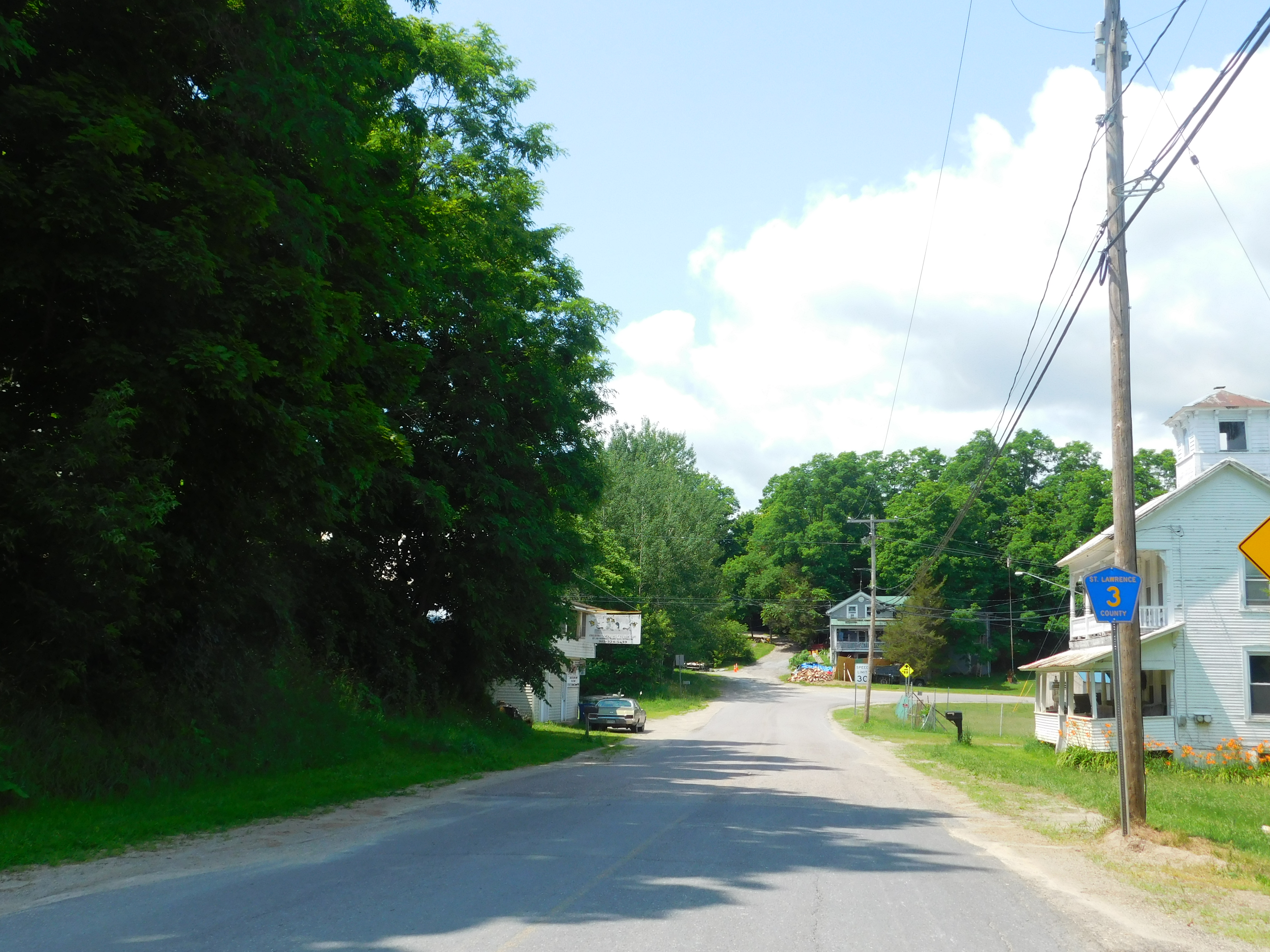
- CR 3 in the hamlet of Rossie

Highway names
- Interstates: Interstate X (I-X)
- US Highways: U.S. Route X (US X)
- State: New York State Route X (NY X)
- County: County Route X (CR X)

System links
- New York Highways; Interstate; US; State; Reference; Parkways

County routes in St. Lawrence County, New York, are signed with the Manual on Uniform Traffic Control Devices-standard yellow-on-blue pentagon route marker.

== Routes 1–30 ==
| Route | Length (mi) | Length (km) | From | Via | To | OSM relation | Notes |
|---|---|---|---|---|---|---|---|
| CR 1 | 1.65 | 2.66 | NY 37 | Webster Road in Hammond | CR 6 | 3128234 | |
| CR 2 | 2.68 | 4.31 | NY 37 | Brier Hill–Longs Corners Road in Morristown | NY 58 | 3128238 | |
| CR 3 (1) | 11.19 | 18.01 | CR 10 in Rossie | Oxbow–Rossie–Hammond Road | NY 37 in Hammond | 3128242 | Part north of CR 8 was formerly NY 185 |
| CR 3 (2) | 2.40 | 3.86 | CR 6 | Old Oak Creek Road in Hammond | Chippewa Creek Road | 5583338 | |
| CR 4 | 5.80 | 9.33 | CR 6 | Eel Weir Road in Oswegatchie | NY 68 | 3690333 | |
| CR 5 | 2.34 | 3.77 | CR 6 | Black Lake–Brier Hill Road in Morristown | NY 37 | 3691728 | |
| CR 6 | 28.66 | 46.12 | Jefferson County line in Hammond (becomes CR 111) | Hammond–Ogdensburg Road | NY 37 in Oswegatchie | 3128270 | Discontinuous at Hammond village limits |
| CR 7 | 4.33 | 6.97 | CR 10 | Macomb–Pope Mills Road in Macomb | NY 184 | 3128271 | |
| CR 8 | 4.30 | 6.92 | CR 3 in Rossie | Brasie Corners–Rossie Road | NY 58 in Macomb | 3128272 | |
| CR 9 | 4.40 | 7.08 | Jefferson County line in Rossie (becomes CR 26) | Spragueville Road | US 11 in Gouverneur | 3687589 | |
| CR 10 (1) | 24.12 | 38.82 | Jefferson County line in Rossie (becomes CR 25) | Rossie–Heuvelton Road | NY 184 in De Peyster | 3128265 | |
| CR 10 (2) | 9.34 | 15.03 | Heuvelton village line in Oswegatchie | Rossie–Heuvelton Road | CR 27 in Lisbon | 3128266 | |
| CR 11 | 14.90 | 23.98 | Gouverneur village line in Gouverneur | Gouverneur–De Peyster Road | CR 10 in De Peyster | 3128267 | |
| CR 12 | 6.96 | 11.20 | Jefferson County line in Rossie (becomes CR 25) | Oxbow–Gouverneur Road | Gouverneur village line in Gouverneur | 3128268 | |
| CR 13 | 2.20 | 3.54 | Small Flats Road | Baker Corners–Barnum School Road in Hermon | CR 19 | 3120275 | |
| CR 14 (1) | 7.15 | 11.51 | NY 812 in De Kalb | Rensselaer Falls–Madrid Road | NY 68 in Canton | 3132082 | Discontinuous at Rensselaer Falls village limits; designated NY 186 from c. 1931 to 1982 |
| CR 14 (2) | 10.44 | 16.80 | NY 68 in Canton | Rensselaer Falls–Madrid Road | NY 345 in Madrid | 3128237 | Part north of south junction with CR 27 is a former routing of NY 345 |
| CR 14 (3) | 11.62 | 18.70 | NY 345 in Madrid | Rensselaer Falls–Madrid Road | NY 37 in Louisville | 3132083 | |
| CR 15 | 9.63 | 15.50 | US 11 in Canton | Route 11–Rensselaer Falls and Rensselaer Falls–Heuvelton roads | Heuvelton village line in Oswegatchie | 3132084 | Discontinuous at Rensselaer Falls village limits |
| CR 16 | 2.96 | 4.76 | NY 812 in De Kalb | McAdoo Road | CR 15 in Canton | 3132085 | |
| CR 17 (1) | 4.66 | 7.50 | CR 11 in De Peyster | Degrasse–De Peyster Road | NY 812 in De Kalb | 3132086 | |
| CR 17 (2) | 12.11 | 19.49 | NY 812 in De Kalb | Degrasse–De Peyster Road | CR 24 | 3132087 | Discontinuous at Hermon village limits; formerly part of NY 87 |
| CR 17 (3) | 5.69 | 9.16 | CR 24 | Degrasse–De Peyster Road | CR 27 | 3132088 | |
| CR 18 | 3.73 | 6.00 | CR 20 | De Kalb–Richville Road in De Kalb | CR 19 | 3132089 | |
| CR 19 | 12.80 | 20.60 | Edwards village line in Edwards | Edwards–De Kalb Road | US 11 in De Kalb | 3120277 | |
| CR 20 | 8.65 | 13.92 | Richville village line in De Kalb | Richville–Hermon Road | Hermon village line in Hermon | 3132093 | |
| CR 21 | 15.30 | 24.62 | CR 24 in Edwards | Edwards–Hermon–Canton Road | CR 25 in Canton | 3132094 | Discontinuous at Hermon village limits |
| CR 22 (1) | 6.94 | 11.17 | Jefferson County line in Rossie | Spragueville–Emeryville Road | NY 58 / NY 812 in Fowler | 3132095 | Locally known as Farm-to-Market Rd. |
| CR 22 (2) | 1.68 | 2.70 | Little York Road | Spragueville–Emeryville Road in Fowler | Oswegatchie River bridge | 3132096 | |
| CR 23 | 5.66 | 9.11 | NY 3 in Pitcairn | East Pitcairn–South Edwards Road | NY 58 in Edwards | 3132097 | |
| CR 23A | 0.73 | 1.17 | NY 3 | East Pitcairn–South Edwards Road in Pitcairn | CR 23 | 3132098 | |
| CR 24 (1) | 7.86 | 12.65 | Jefferson and Lewis county lines in Fowler | Russell–Pierrepont Road | NY 58 in Edwards | 3132099 | |
| CR 24 (2) | 23.51 | 37.84 | NY 58 in Edwards | Russell–Pierrepont Road | NY 56 in Pierrepont | 3120278 | Discontinuous at Edwards village limits; part south of north junction with CR 17 was formerly part of NY 87 |
| CR 25 | 10.18 | 16.38 | CR 24 in Russell | Russell–Martin Corners and Pike roads | NY 68 in Canton | 3132100 | |
| CR 26 | 1.28 | 2.06 | NY 812 | Pitcairn–Fowler Road in Pitcairn | NY 3 | 3132101 | |
| CR 27 (1) | 28.22 | 45.42 | NY 3 | Fine–Canton–Lisbon Road | Canton village line | 3120279 | |
| CR 27 (2) | 5.22 | 8.40 | Canton village line | Fine–Canton–Lisbon Road | CR 14 | 3128240 | Former routing of NY 345 |
| CR 27 (3) | 9.49 | 15.27 | CR 14 | Fine–Canton–Lisbon Road | CR 28 | 3132102 | |
| CR 27A | 1.86 | 2.99 | NY 58 | Fine–Canton–Lisbon Road in Fine | CR 27 | 5583337 | |
| CR 28 | 15.05 | 24.22 | NY 37 in Lisbon | Ogdensburg–Waddington Road | NY 37 in Waddington | 3128241 | Formerly NY 37A |
| CR 28A | 3.11 | 5.01 | NY 68 in Oswegatchie | Arnold Wagner Road | CR 28 in Lisbon | | |
| CR 29 | 4.23 | 6.81 | CR 27 in Canton | Waterman Hill–Pierrepont Road | CR 24 in Pierrepont | 3132103 | |
| CR 30 | 5.93 | 9.54 | CR 27 in Lisbon | Lisbon–Madrid Road | CR 31 in Madrid | 3128243 | |

== Routes 31 and up ==
| Route | Length (mi) | Length (km) | From | Via | To | OSM Relations | Notes |
|---|---|---|---|---|---|---|---|
| CR 31 | 8.97 | 14.44 | CR 28 in Lisbon | Madrid–Chipman Road | CR 14 in Madrid | 3128244 | |
| CR 31A | 4.20 | 6.76 | CR 31 | Connie Woods Road in Waddington | NY 37 | 3128245 | |
| CR 33 | 5.03 | 8.10 | CR 31 | Chipman–Waddington Road in Waddington | NY 345 | 3128247 | |
| CR 34 | 6.57 | 10.57 | CR 14 | West Potsdam Road in Potsdam | NY 345 | 3128248 | |
| CR 35 | 15.08 | 24.27 | NY 68 in Canton | Crary Mills–Norwood Road | Norwood village line in Potsdam | 3120280 | Discontinuous at US 11 |
| CR 36 | 8.35 | 13.44 | CR 14 | Chase Mills–Louisville Road in Louisville | NY 56 | 3128249 | Discontinuous at CR 39 |
| CR 37 (1) | 8.03 | 12.92 | Massena village line in Massena | Massena–Helena–Franklin County Line Road | CR 53 / CR 55 in Brasher | 5586618 | Discontinuous at St. Regis River |
| CR 37 (2) | 3.76 | 6.05 | NY 37C | Massena–Helena–Franklin County Line Road in Brasher | Franklin County line (becomes CR 9) | 5586617 | |
| CR 38 | 13.83 | 22.26 | NY 310 in Madrid | Norfolk–Brasher Center Road | CR 53 in Brasher | 3687580 | Part west of CR 38A was formerly part of NY 56A |
| CR 38A | 0.47 | 0.76 | CR 38 | West Main Street in Norfolk | NY 56 | 5586619 | Formerly part of NY 56A |
| CR 39 | 4.90 | 7.89 | NY 310 in Norfolk | Raymondville–Louisville Road | NY 37 in Louisville | 3128251 | |
| CR 40 | 3.42 | 5.50 | NY 56 in Norfolk | North Racquette Road | Massena village line in Louisville | 3687581 | |
| CR 41 | 2.15 | 3.46 | NY 37 | Browning Road in Louisville | NY 131 | 3687582 | |
| CR 42 | 4.46 | 7.18 | Massena village line | Massena–Massena Center Road in Massena | Kinnie Road | 3687583 | |
| CR 42A | 0.44 | 0.71 | Trippany Road | Massena–Massena Center Road in Massena | CR 42 | 5586620 | |
| CR 43 | 1.49 | 2.40 | NY 37B | Massena–Louisville Town Line Road in Louisville | NY 131 | 3687584 | Formerly part of NY 131 |
| CR 44 | 8.76 | 14.10 | CR 38 in Madrid | Norfolk–Waddington Road | Waddington village line in Waddington | 3128252 | |
| CR 45 | 1.39 | 2.24 | Roosevelt Road | Rooseveltown Access Road in Massena | Haverstock Road | 5586621 | Discontinuous at Raquette River |
| CR 46 | 2.65 | 4.26 | CR 37 | Massena–Racquet River Road in Massena | NY 37C | 3690334 | |
| CR 47 | 17.76 | 28.58 | NY 72 in Parishville | Parishville–Norfolk Road | NY 56 in Norfolk | 3120281 | Discontinuous at NY 11B and US 11 |
| CR 48 | 3.14 | 5.05 | Norwood village line in Potsdam | Norwood–Knapps Station Road | CR 47 in Stockholm | 3687616 | |
| CR 48A | 0.37 | 0.60 | End of county maintenance | Yaleville Road in Norfolk | NY 56 | 3687617 | |
| CR 49 (1) | 7.46 | 12.01 | NY 11B in Hopkinton | Hopkinton–Winthrop Road | US 11 / NY 420 in Stockholm | 5586622 | |
| CR 49 (2) | 1.39 | 2.24 | NY 420 | Hopkinton–Winthrop Road in Stockholm | NY 420 | 3690335 | |
| CR 49 (3) | 7.99 | 12.86 | NY 420 in Stockholm | Hopkinton–Winthrop Road | CR 38 in Norfolk | 3690336 | |
| CR 50 | 5.34 | 8.59 | NY 11C | Brasher Falls–Deer River Road in Brasher | CR 55 | 3690337 | |
| CR 51 | 3.87 | 6.23 | CR 49 | Fort Jackson–Wagstaff Road in Lawrence | CR 54 | 3690338 | |
| CR 52 | 2.97 | 4.78 | NY 11C in Lawrence | North Lawrence–Moira Road | Franklin County line in Brasher (becomes CR 6) | 3690340 | |
| CR 53 | 9.76 | 15.71 | NY 11C | Brasher Falls–Helena Road in Brasher | CR 37 / CR 55 | 3690341 | |
| CR 54 | 5.50 | 8.85 | CR 49 in Stockholm | Stockholm–Lawrence Road | US 11 in Lawrence | 3690342 | Part east of CR 55 was formerly part of NY 195 |
| CR 55 (1) | 5.44 | 8.75 | NY 11B | Nicholville–Helena Road in Lawrence | US 11 / NY 11C | 5586623 | Part south of CR 54 was formerly part of NY 195; part of CR 54 to US 11 was formerly NY 853 |
| CR 55 (2) | 8.88 | 14.29 | NY 11C in Lawrence | Nicholville–Helena Road | CR 37 / CR 53 in Brasher | 3690343 | |
| CR 56 | 6.05 | 9.74 | CR 47 in Parishville | Allens Falls Road | NY 72 in Hopkinton | 3690344 | |
| CR 57 | 0.73 | 1.17 | Hatch Road | West Stockholm Road in Stockholm | US 11 | 3690345 | |
| CR 58 | 7.67 | 12.34 | NY 56 in Colton | Colton–Parishville Road | NY 72 in Parishville | 3120282 | |
| CR 59 | 3.57 | 5.75 | NY 56 in Pierrepont | West Hannawa Road | Potsdam village line in Potsdam | 3690346 | |
| CR 60 | 7.54 | 12.13 | NY 3 in Fine | Oswegatchie–Newton Falls Road | NY 3 in Clifton | 3690347 | |
| CR 61 | 1.13 | 1.82 | Front Street | Wanakena Road in Fine | NY 3 | 3690348 | |
| CR 62 | 2.39 | 3.85 | North Street | Conifer Road in Piercefield | NY 3 | 3690349 | |

== See also ==
- County routes in New York
- List of former state routes in New York (101–200)
