= Hailesboro, New York =

- Hamlet
- Location within New York Location within the United States
- Coordinates: 44°18′36″N 75°26′47″W
- Country: United States
- State: New York
- County: St. Lawrence

Area
  - Total: 4.807 sq mi (12.45 km^{2})
  - Land: 4.727 sq mi (12.24 km^{2})
  - Water: 0.080 sq mi (0.21 km^{2})
- Elevation: 492 ft (150 m)

Population (2010)
  - Total: 624
  - Density: 132/sq mi (51.0/km^{2})
- Time zone: UTC-5 (Eastern (EST))
  - Summer (DST): UTC-4 (EDT)
- ZIP code: 13645
- Area codes: 315 & 680
- GNIS feature ID: 976391

Hailesboro is a hamlet and census-designated place in St. Lawrence County, New York, United States located in the town of Fowler. As of the 2020 census, Hailesboro had a population of 544. Hailesboro has a post office with ZIP code 13645. New York State Route 58 and New York State Route 812 pass through the community.

== Geography ==
According to the U.S. Census Bureau, the community has an area of 4.807 square miles (12.45 km^{2}); 4.727 square miles (12.24 km^{2}) of its area is land, and 0.080 square miles (0.21 km^{2}) is water.

== Education ==
The census-designated place is in the Gouverneur Central School District.
