= 193rd New York Infantry Regiment =

193rd New York Volunteer Infantry Regiment
- Active: March 6–28, 1865 - January 18, 1866
- Country: United States
- Allegiance: Union
- Branch: Union Army
- Type: Infantry
- Role: Garrison and Occupation duties
- Size: 717 (Roster)
- Part of: Army of the Shenandoah (March and April 1865); District of West Virginia (July 1865)
- Engagements: None

Commanders
- Notable commanders: Colonel John B. Van Petten; Lieutenant Colonel John C. Gilmore; Major Alfred Morton

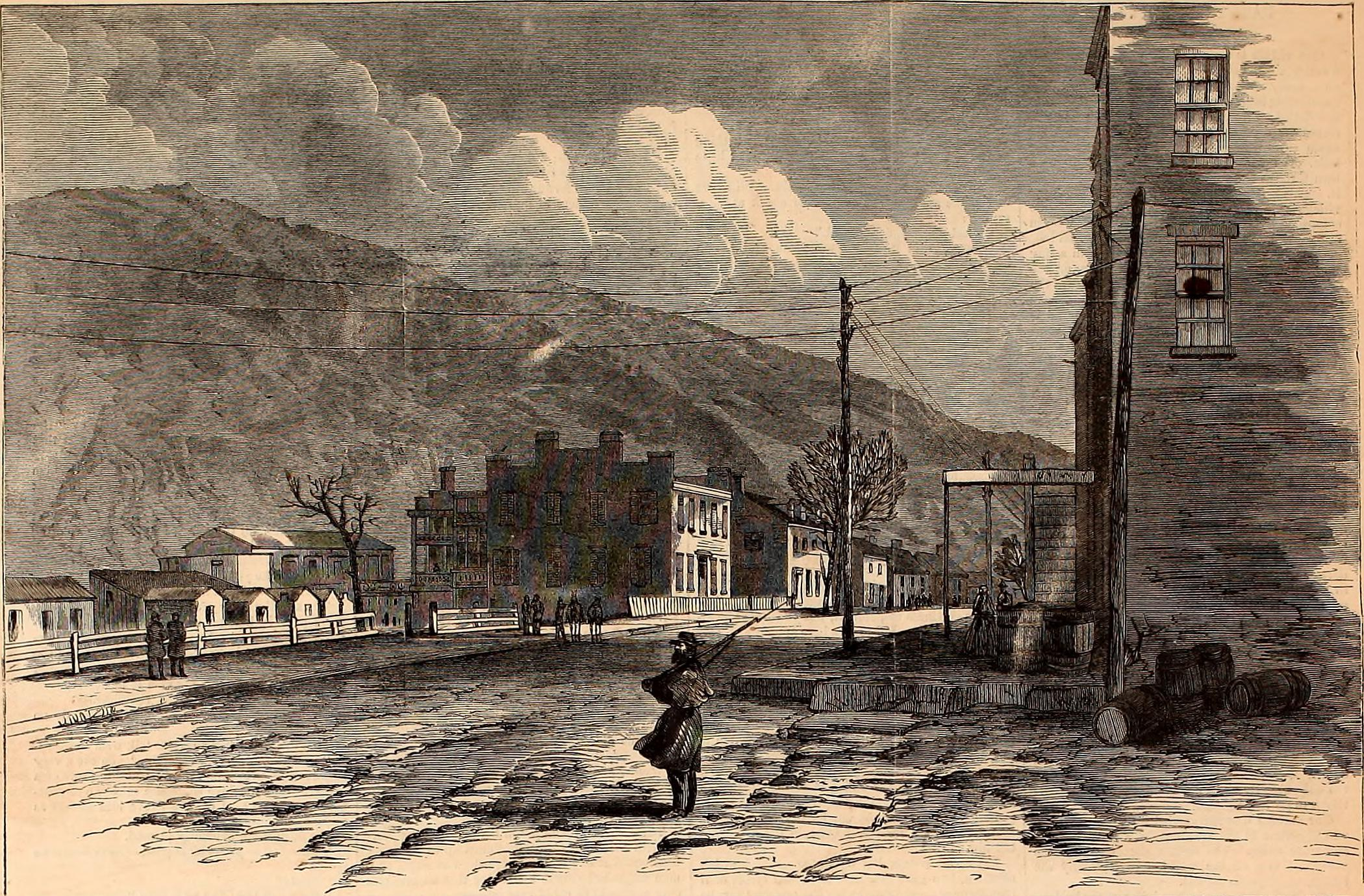
An illustration of Harper's Ferry from Harper's Weekly. The regiment was mustered out of service at Harper's Ferry after they had conducted Garrison Occupation Duties.

The 193rd New York Volunteer Infantry Regiment also known as the 193rd New York was an Infantry regiment that was mustered in the final months of the American Civil War. The regiment primarily conduct duty in the Army of Shenandoah and the District of West Virginia until they were mustered out of service.

== Organization ==
On January 21, 1865, Colonel John B. Van Petten was given authority to raise the regiment; and it was organized at Albany and mustered into service for three year's service.

The companies of the regiment were recruited at:

- A -- Utica, Auburn, Oswego and Syracuse
- B -- Hermon, Malone, Pierrepont, Hammond, Louisville, Potsdam, Brasher, Macomb, Colton and Waddington
- C -- Auburn, Rochester and Syracuse
- D -- Oswego, Volney, Granby, Constantia and Amboy
- E -- Syracuse, Oswego and Auburn
- F -- Fowler, Brasher, Lisbon, Hopkinton, Burke, Lawrence and Louisville
- G -- Bellmont, Lisbon, Stockholm, Cape Vincent, Fowler, Rossie, Lawrence, Russell, Waddington, Savannah, Pierrepont, Macomb and Moira
- H -- Watertown and Auburn
- I -- Oswego
- K -- Norwich, Syracuse and Auburn

== Service ==
The regiment left the state in detachments in March and April 1865, and was attached to the 3rd Brigade, 3rd Division, Army of the Shenandoah. After July 1865, the regiment was attached to the District of West Virginia for duty. The regiment conducted garrison and occupation duties until January, 1866.

The regiment was mustered out on January 18, 1866, at Harper's Ferry, West Virginia

== Casualties ==
The 193rd New York lost 25 enlisted men to disease.

== Notable commanders ==
- Colonel John B. Van Petten - Mustered out with the regiment
- Lieutenant Colonel John C. Gilmore
- Major Alfred Morton

== See also ==
- List of New York Civil War regiments
- New York in the Civil War
