= New York State Route 185 (1930s–1980) =

Former state highway in New York State

New York State Route 185
- Former NY 185 (c. 1980) highlighted in red

Route information
- Maintained by NYSDOT
- Length: 5.3 mi (8.5 km)
- Existed: c. 1931–April 10, 1980

Major junctions
- West end: NY 37 in Hammond
- East end: CR 3 / CR 8 in Rossie

Location
- Country: United States
- State: New York
- Counties: St. Lawrence

Highway system
- New York Highways; Interstate; US; State; Reference; Parkways
← NY 184	→ NY 185

New York State Route 185 (NY 185) was a 5.3-mile-long (8.5 km) state highway located within St. Lawrence County in the North Country of New York in the United States. Although the route followed a mostly north–south alignment, it was considered an east–west highway by the New York State Department of Transportation (NYSDOT). The western terminus of NY 185 was at an intersection with NY 37 in the town of Hammond. The eastern terminus was at a junction with Brasie Corners–Rossie Road in the hamlet of Rossie, located within the town of Rossie.

NY 185 was assigned in the early 1930s as a spur leading northeast from Rossie to NY 58. It was extended north to NY 37 soon afterward, but truncated in the 1940s to consist only of the Rossie–NY 37 segment. The NY 185 designation was eliminated in 1980, and its former routing was removed from the state highway system two years later as part of a highway maintenance swap between New York State and St. Lawrence County. The final path of NY 185 is now part of County Route 3 (CR 3).

== Route description ==
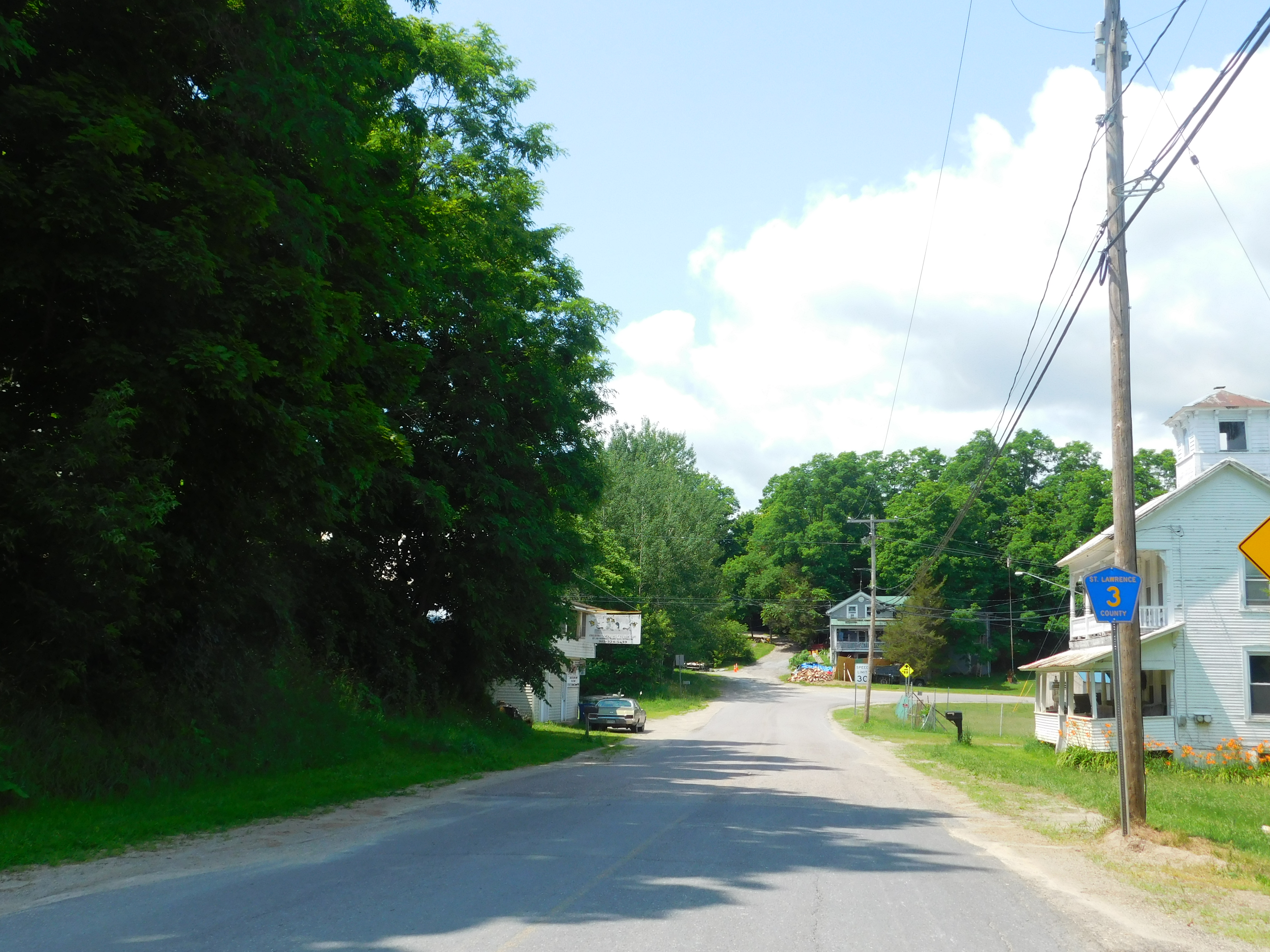
CR 3 (former NY 185) west from CR 8 in the hamlet of Rossie

NY 185 began at an intersection with NY 37 in the town of Hammond. The route went to the southeast as a two-lane rural highway south of Black Lake. A short distance from NY 37, NY 185 crossed Black Creek, which flowed into the namesake lake. The route winded eastward, and southwestward through Hammond, passing to a general southeastern direction. At Alamogin Road, NY 185 turned southward once again, making several winds eastward and southward into the town of Rossie and remained a two-lane rural highway. After the intersection with South Hammond Road, NY 185 entered the hamlet of Rossie, where it served as the main street as a two-lane roadway. Within the hamlet, NY 185 intersected with County Route 8 (Brassie Corners–Rossie Road), where the designation terminated.

== History ==
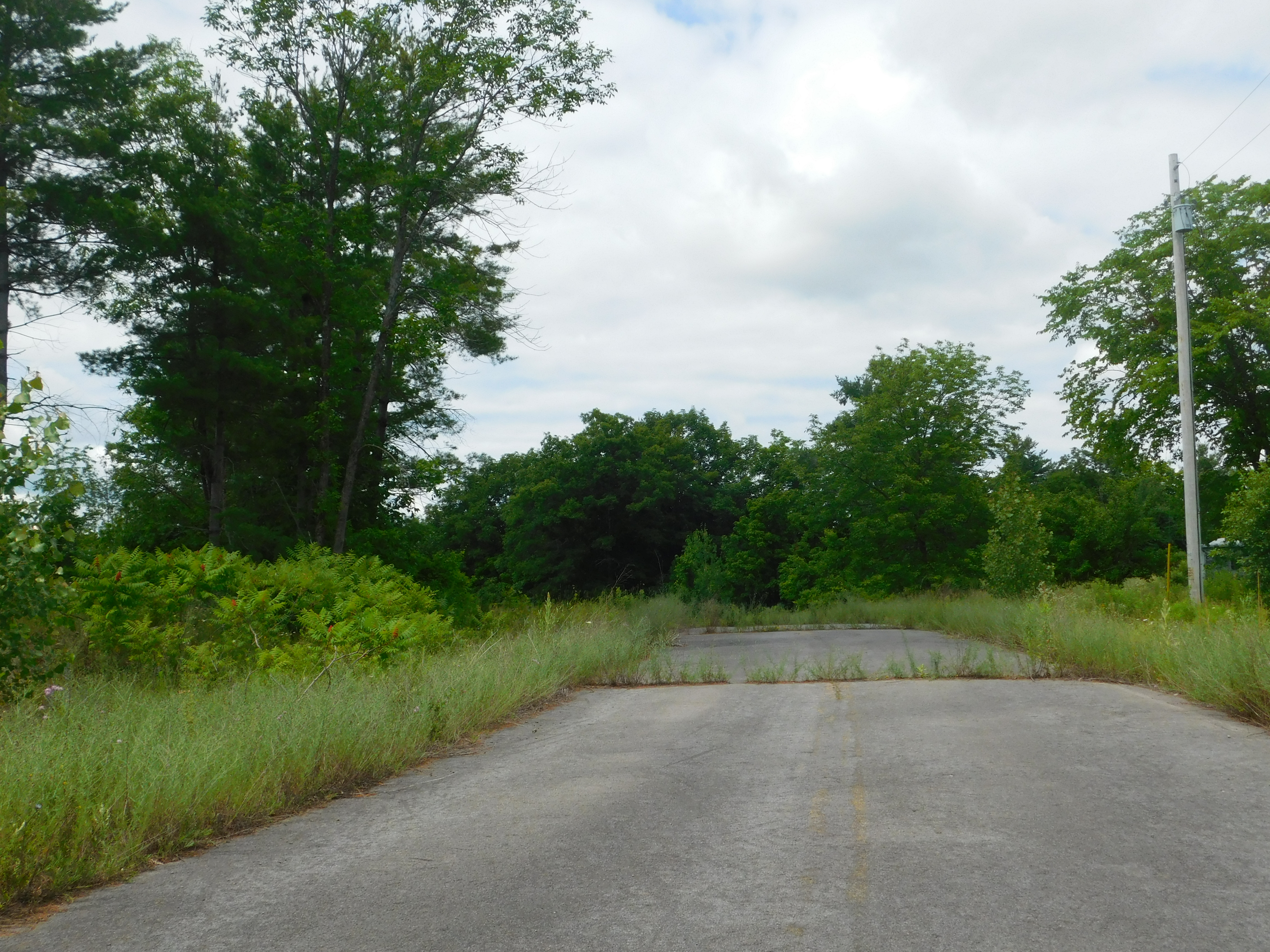
An abandoned stretch of NY 185 in Hammond

NY 185 was assigned c. 1931 as a spur connecting NY 58 to the hamlet of Rossie. It was extended north from Rossie to NY 37 in the mid-1930s, but truncated on its south end to the hamlet in the late 1940s. It remained unchanged until April 10, 1980, when the designation was removed. Two years later, on September 1, 1982, maintenance of the Rossie–NY 37 highway was transferred from the state of New York to St. Lawrence County as part of a highway maintenance swap between the two levels of government. NY 185's former routing north of Rossie is now part of CR 3. The route's pre-1940s routing east of the community was given to the county prior to 1982 and is now CR 8.

== Major intersections ==
The entire route was in St. Lawrence County.

Location	mi	km	Destinations	Notes
Town of Hammond	0.0	0.0	NY 37	Western terminus
Rossie	5.3	8.5	CR 3 / CR 8 (Brasie Corners–Rossie Road)	Eastern terminus; hamlet of Rossie
1.000 mi = 1.609 km; 1.000 km = 0.621 mi
