= 193rd Regiment =

193rd Regiment may refer to:

- 193rd Glider Infantry Regiment, United States
- 193rd Mechanized Regiment, Greece

== American Civil War regiments ==
- 193rd New York Infantry Regiment
- 193rd Ohio Infantry Regiment

== See also ==
- 193rd (disambiguation)
