= Cyrus Miles =

American politician

Member of the Michigan House of Representatives from the St. Clair County 2nd district
- In office January 4, 1865 – December 31, 1866
- In office January 6, 1869 – December 31, 1870

Mayor of Port Huron, Michigan
- In office 1864–1865
- Preceded by: Frederick L. Wells
- Succeeded by: Jared Kibbee

Personal details
- Born: April 13, 1828 Fowler, New York
- Died: March 2, 1877 (aged 48)
- Party: Democratic

Cyrus Miles (April 13, 1828 – March 2, 1877) was a Michigan politician.

== Early life ==
Miles was born on April 13, 1828, in Fowler, New York. In 1852, Miles moved to Port Huron, Michigan.

== Career ==
Miles was a lawyer. In 1856, Miles entered the banking business in Port Huron. Miles was the mayor of Port Huron from 1864 to 1865. On November 8, 1864, Miles was elected to the Michigan House of Representatives where he represented the St. Clair County 2nd district from January 4, 1865, to December 31, 1866. On November 3, 1868, Miles was again elected to the state house where he represented the same district again from January 6, 1869, to December 31, 1870.

== Death ==
Miles died on March 2, 1877.
