= New York State Route 184 =

State highway in St. Lawrence County, New York, US

New York State Route 184
- Map of St. Lawrence County in northern New York with NY 184 highlighted in red

Route information
- Maintained by NYSDOT
- Length: 13.69 mi (22.03 km)
- Existed: c. 1931–present

Major junctions
- West end: NY 58 in Macomb
- East end: NY 812 in Heuvelton

Location
- Country: United States
- State: New York
- Counties: St. Lawrence

Highway system
- New York Highways; Interstate; US; State; Reference; Parkways
| ← NY 183 | → NY 185 |

New York State Route 184 (NY 184) is a state highway in St. Lawrence County, New York, in the United States. The route is signed as east–west; however, it runs more in a northeast–southwest direction. It extends for 13.69 miles (22.03 km) between an intersection with NY 58 in the town of Macomb and a junction with NY 812 in the village of Heuvelton. The two-lane route passes through mostly rural areas of the county. NY 184 was assigned in the early 1930s to most of its current alignment; however, it initially veered southeastward in the town of De Peyster to serve the hamlet of De Peyster. The route was realigned to bypass the community shortly afterward.

== Route description ==
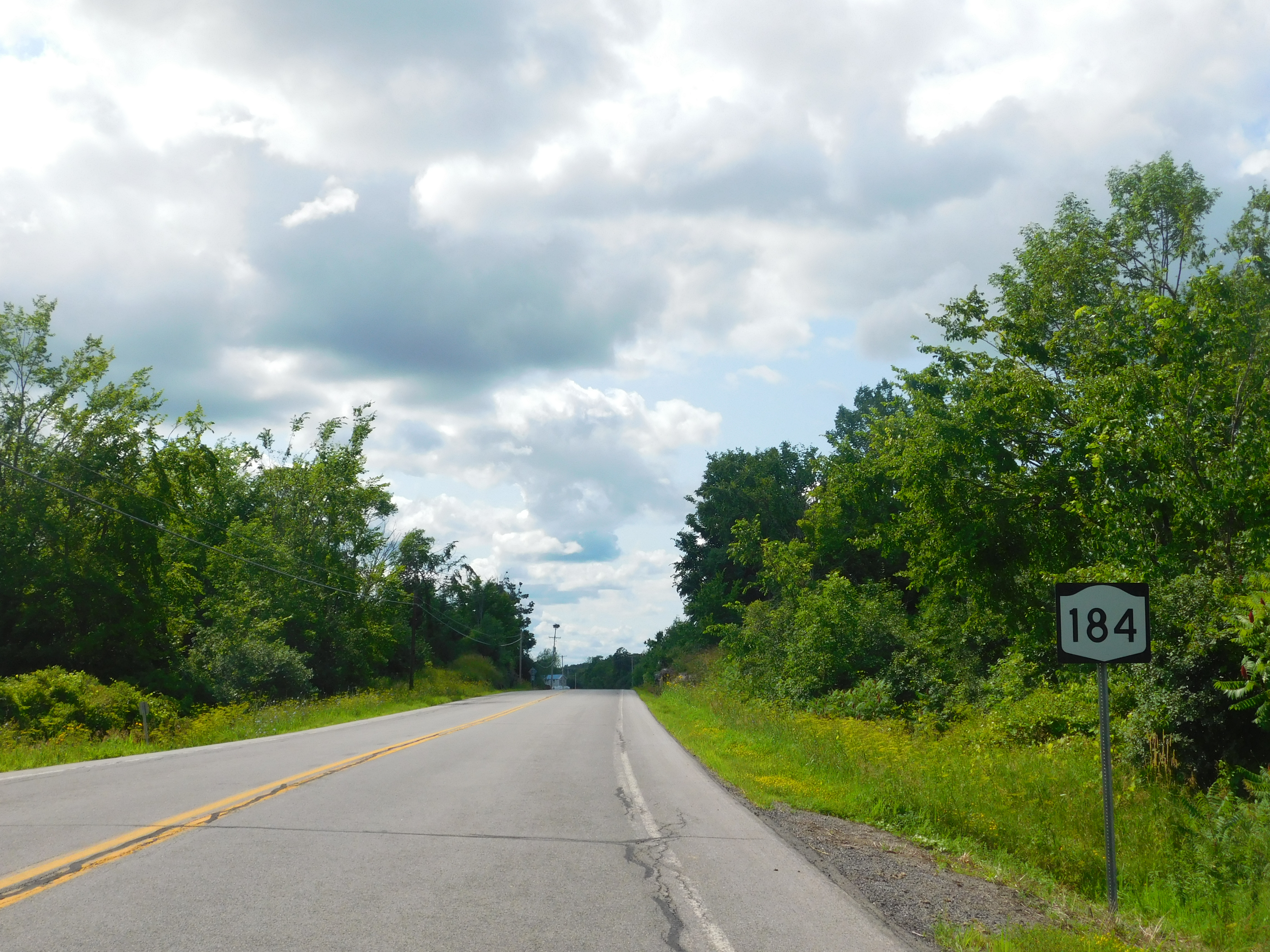
NY 184 southbound in De Peyster

NY 184 begins at an intersection with NY 58 in the hamlet of Pope Mills, located east of Black Lake in the town of Macomb. The route heads northeast through the heavily forested area as a two-lane road, passing a small number of isolated houses along the way. It intersects with County Route 7 (CR 7 or Macomb Road) before entering a stretch with several farms ahead of the De Peyster town line. About 2.5 miles (4.0 km) into De Peyster, the route crosses over Fish Creek and briefly traverses a marshy area surrounding the waterway. Past the stream, NY 184 curves northward for roughly 1.5 miles (2.4 km) prior to taking a more pronounced northeasterly track toward the town of Oswegatchie.

Near the De Peyster–Oswegatchie town line, the route begins to parallel the south bank of the Oswegatchie River as it merges with the alignment of CR 10 (Old State Road). From here, NY 184 continues alongside the Oswegatchie River into the town of Oswegatchie and its village of Heuvelton not far from the town line, where the route becomes known as Union Street. As Union Street, NY 184 serves a mostly residential stretch of buildings along the riverbank before ending at a junction with NY 812 (State Street) across the river from the village center.

== History ==
The origins of NY 184 date back to 1916 when the state of New York awarded a contract on July 18 to improve 11.16 miles (17.96 km) of roads in the town of Oswegatchie to state highway standards. While the project mostly dealt with improving what is now NY 812 between Heuvelton and the city of Ogdensburg, it also covered a north–south highway connecting Heuvelton to the hamlet of De Peyster 4.5 miles (7.2 km) to the southwest. The rebuilt roads were added to the state highway system on October 13, 1921, as unsigned State Highway 1388 (SH 1388). The De Peyster–Heuvelton leg of SH 1388 did not receive a posted route number until c. 1931 when it became part of NY 184, a new route extending from Pope Mills to Heuvelton via De Peyster. It was realigned c. 1933 to bypass De Peyster on a new highway to the northwest. NY 184's former routing to De Peyster is now part of Plimpton Road west of De Peyster and part of CR 10 north of the hamlet.

In January 1978, the New York State Department of Transportation and St. Lawrence County discussed the option of transferring maintenance of several state roads, including NY 184, to the county in return for 14 county roads. By January 1980, as part of negotiations, NY 184 along with NY 421 were dropped from the proposed swap.

== Major intersections ==
The entire route is in St. Lawrence County.

| Location | mi | km | Destinations | Notes |
|---|---|---|---|---|
| Macomb | 0.00 | 0.00 | NY 58 – Edwardsville, Gouverneur | Western terminus; hamlet of Pope Mills |
| De Peyster | 12.47 | 20.07 | CR 10 (Old State Road) | Former routing of NY 184 |
| Heuvelton | 13.69 | 22.03 | NY 812 (State Street) – Ogdensburg, De Kalb | Eastern terminus |
1.000 mi = 1.609 km; 1.000 km = 0.621 mi
