= New York State Route 812 =

State highway in the North Country of New York

New York State Route 812
- Map of northern New York with NY 812 highlighted in red

Route information
- Maintained by NYSDOT and the Ogdensburg Bridge and Port Authority
- Length: 80.91 mi (130.21 km)
- Existed: July 1, 1977–present

Major junctions
- South end: NY 12 / NY 26 in Lowville
- NY 3 in Harrisville; US 11 / NY 58 in Gouverneur; NY 37 in Ogdensburg
- North end: Highway 16 at the Canadian border in Ogdensburg

Location
- Country: United States
- State: New York
- Counties: Lewis, St. Lawrence

Highway system
- New York Highways; Interstate; US; State; Reference; Parkways
← I-790	→ NY 825
← I-87	NY 87	→ I-88

New York State Route 812 (NY 812) is a state highway in the North Country of New York in the United States. The southern terminus of the route is at an intersection with NY 12 and NY 26 in the Lewis County village of Lowville. Its northern terminus is at the Canada–United States border in Ogdensburg, where it crosses the Ogdensburg–Prescott International Bridge and connects to Highway 16 in Ontario. While most of NY 812 passes through rural areas of the North Country, the route also serves several villages and small communities. The GPS services company Geotab has named it the quietest highway in New York due to its low traffic counts.

The origins of NY 812 date back to the 1930 renumbering of state highways in New York, when the portion of modern NY 812 from Lowville to Croghan became part of NY 26A and the segment of modern NY 812 between De Kalb and Ogdensburg was designated as the northernmost portion of New York State Route 87. NY 87 originally extended as far south as Harrisville; however, it was truncated north to Edwards in the 1940s and farther north to De Kalb in the 1970s.

On July 1, 1977, all of NY 87 and the Lowville–Croghan leg of NY 26A were replaced with NY 812, a new route that began in Lowville and passed through Croghan, Harrisville, Gouverneur, and De Kalb before ending near Ogdensburg. At the time, two sections of the route—from the Croghan village line to a point west of Harrisville and from Harrisville to Fowler—were maintained by the counties that they passed through, and a piece between NY 126 and the Croghan village line was maintained by the village itself. The state of New York assumed maintenance of the Croghan–Harrisville segment in 1980 and took over the Harrisville–Fowler section in 1982.

== Route description ==
=== Lewis County ===
NY 812 begins at an intersection with NY 12 and NY 26 in the center of village of Lowville, which is located in the town of the same name. NY 26, concurrent with NY 12 south of this point, leaves NY 12 and follows NY 812 for several blocks along North State Street before NY 812 turns northeast onto Bostwick Street. Just before Bostwick ends at East State Street, NY 812 turns off and begins its progression northward through a largely rural area of the North Country. As it exits the village of Lowville (but remains in the town of the same name), it begins to parallel the western bank of the Black River. The two entities remain close for roughly 1 mile (1.6 km) before NY 812 crosses over the river and enters New Bremen.

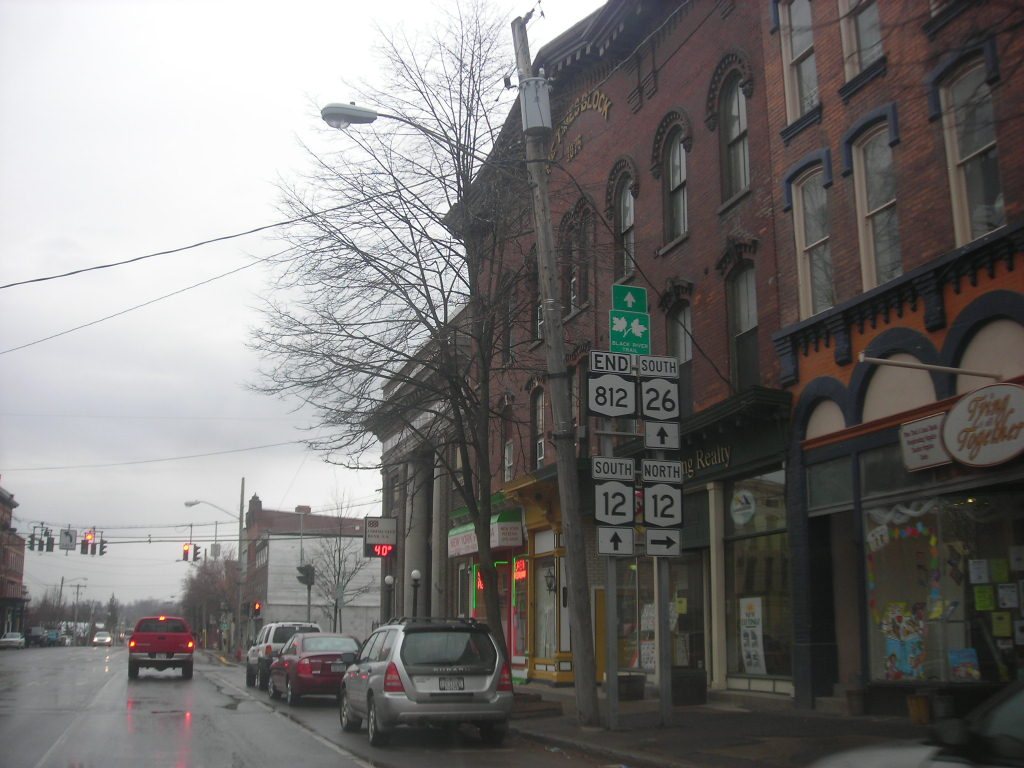
Southern terminus of NY 812 in Lowville

In the hamlet of New Bremen, NY 812 intersects County Route 33 (CR 33), a riverside roadway bypassing both Croghan and Beaver Falls along the east bank of the Black River, southwest of Duflo Airport. NY 812 continues onward, crossing the Black Creek as it enters Croghan, a village situated on the New Bremen–Croghan town line. At the center of the community, NY 812 meets the eastern terminus of NY 126.

Outside of Croghan, NY 812 traverses the Beaver River just north of the village line. The route and the river continue northward along parallel routings for a brief distance before the two separate near the hamlet of High Falls. While the river curves east toward the hamlet, NY 812 presses northward through the rural hamlets of Indian River and Dutton Corners into the town of Diana, where NY 812 starts to parallel the west branch of the Oswegatchie River as both continue north through the town. At Tylers Corners, NY 812 intersects NY 3 and joins the route eastward into Harrisville, where the conjoined routes cross over the Oswegatchie. Northeast of Harrisville in extreme southwestern St. Lawrence County, NY 812 breaks from NY 3 and heads northwest through Pitcairn (crossing over the Oswegatchie once more in the process).

=== St. Lawrence County ===
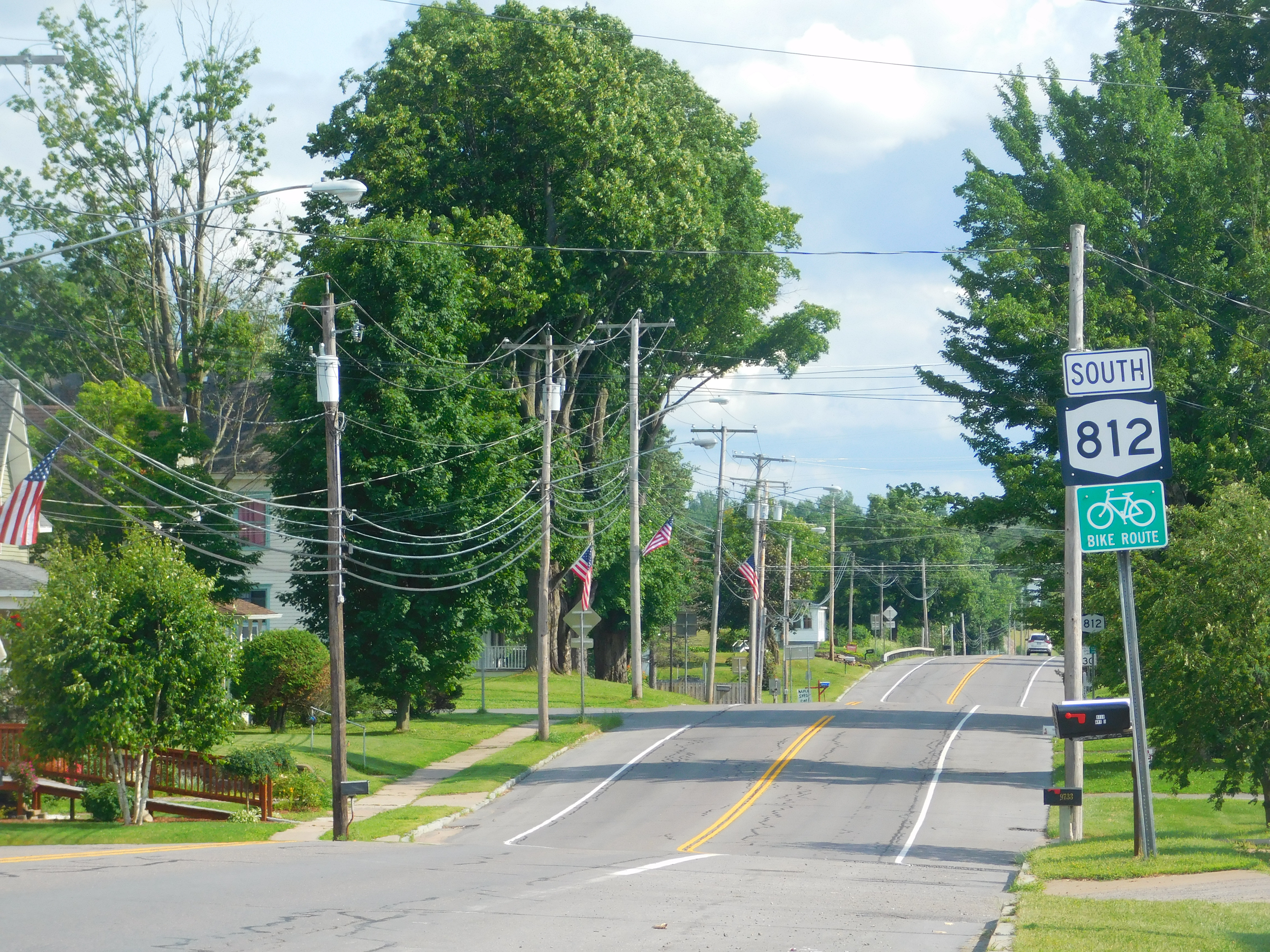
NY 812 southbound from NY 126 in Croghan

From Harrisville, NY 812 travels north through an area of Pitcairn and Fowler. This area contains numerous small lakes and rivers and is predominantly rural in nature. Within Fowler, the route serves the hamlet of Balmat (located on the eastern edge of Sylvia Lake) before intersecting NY 58 in the hamlet of Fowler. Here, NY 812 joins NY 58 northeast along the southern bank of the now-unified Oswegatchie River to the village of Gouverneur, located in the town of the same name, where NY 812 leaves NY 58 but joins U.S. Route 11 (US 11) at the heart of the community.

Outside of the village, US 11 and NY 812 head northeast, roughly paralleling the Oswegatchie once more into the De Kalb village of Richville. The routes quickly exit the village and separate shortly thereafter south of the hamlet of De Kalb, with the Oswegatchie leaving the path of US 11 and following NY 812. NY 812 heads north, serving De Kalb and crossing over the Oswegatchie south of an intersection with CR 14, a connector leading to Rensselaer Falls that was once NY 186. Here, NY 812 begins to the northwest as it approaches the village of Heuvelton.

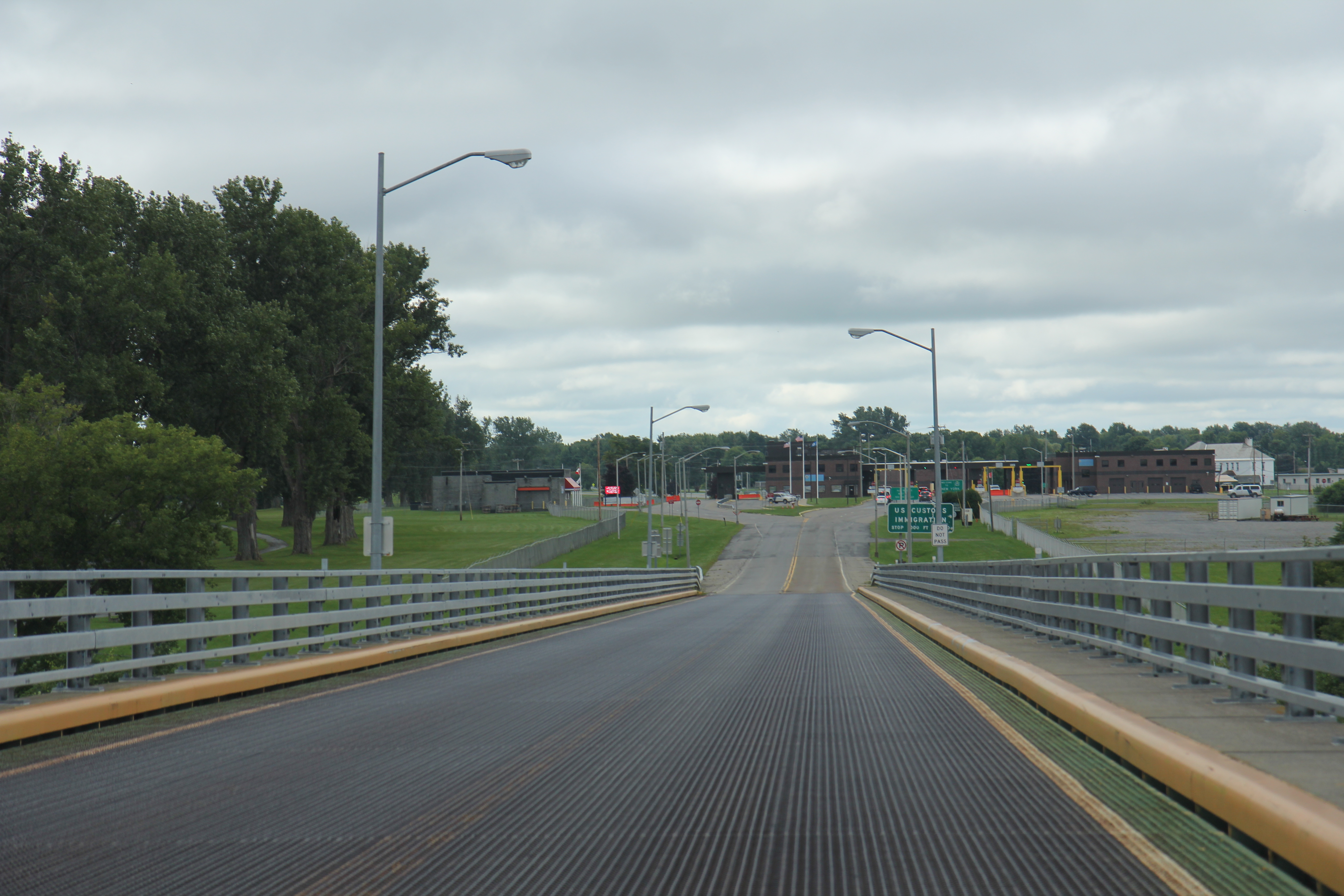
The northern terminus looking south from the Odgensburg-Prescott International Bridge

Within the village, located in the town of Oswegatchie, NY 812, here known as State Street, intersects NY 184 just before traversing the Oswegatchie one final time. The name remains for three blocks before NY 812 departs the village. Farther north, NY 812 passes by the Ogdensburg International Airport before meeting NY 37 at an interchange just south of the Ogdensburg city limits. NY 812 joins NY 37 here, following the route through the southern reaches of the city. The conjoined routes intersect NY 68 before separating near the northeastern city limits. Past NY 37, NY 812 continues onto the Ogdensburg–Prescott International Bridge over the St. Lawrence River, where it becomes Highway 16 upon crossing the Canada–United States border into Ontario.

== History ==
In the 1930 renumbering of state highways in New York, what is now NY 812 between Lowville and Croghan became the southern leg of NY 26A, an alternate route of NY 26 between Lowville and Carthage. Farther north, the portion of modern NY 812 between De Kalb and Ogdensburg became part of NY 87, a route extending from Harrisville to Ogdensburg via Edwards, Russell and De Kalb. From Harrisville to Fowler, NY 87 followed a parallel alignment to modern NY 812 along Hands Flats, Stone, and Pitcairn roads, and CR 24. Between Fowler and De Kalb, NY 87 used what is now NY 58, CR 24, and CR 17 before following current NY 812 north to Ogdensburg. The portion of NY 87 between De Kalb Junction and De Kalb was concurrent with US 11. Both US 11 and NY 87 were shifted south onto a new highway c. 1936, at which time the former routing of US 11 between the new road and De Kalb became part of NY 87.

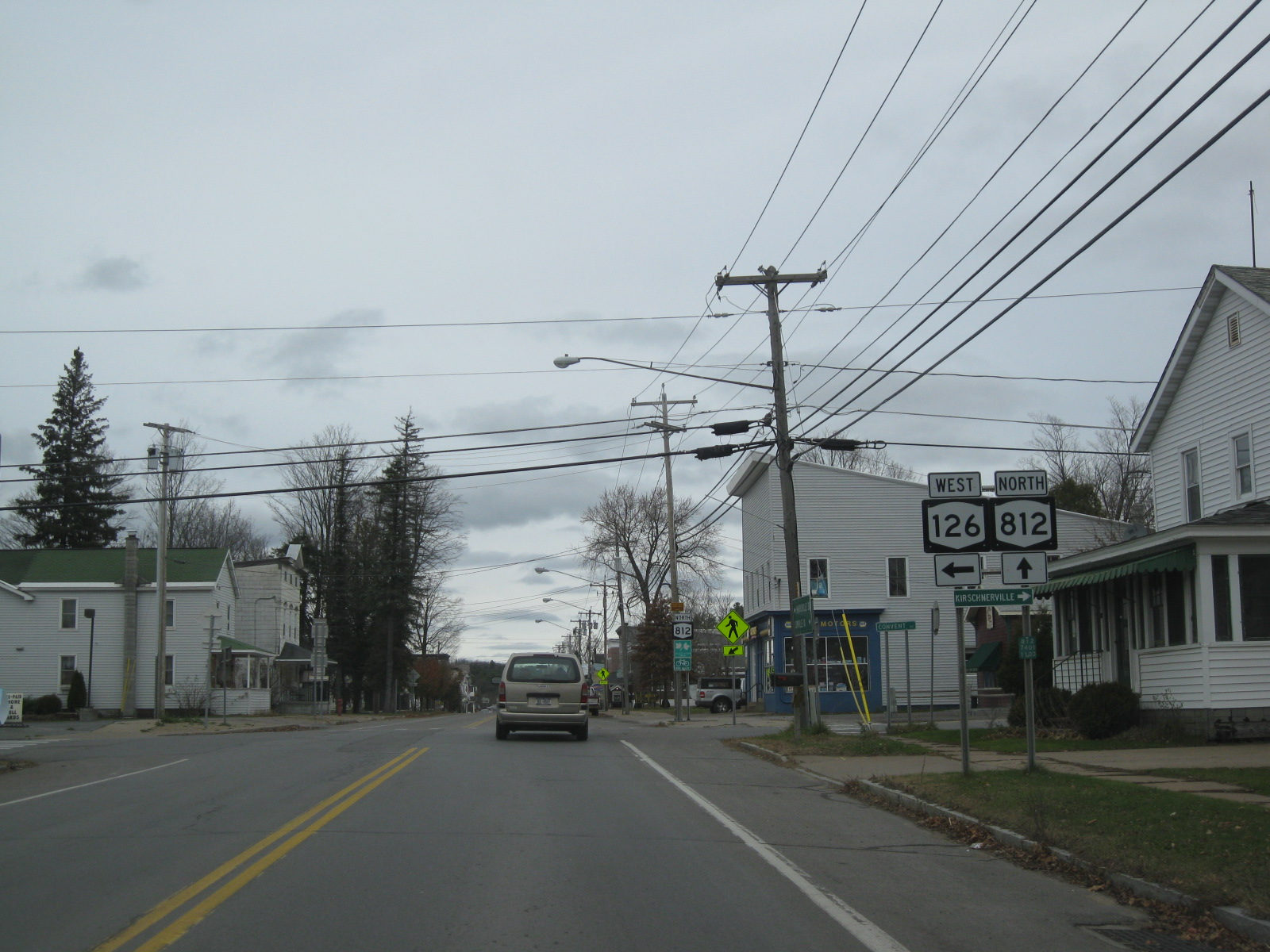
NY 812 north at NY 126 in Croghan. Prior to the 1970s, NY 26A entered this junction on modern NY 812 and left to the west on current NY 126.

NY 87 was gradually truncated northward over time. The first change to the route's southern end came in the early 1940s when it was moved northeastward to the eastern terminus of its former overlap with NY 58 in Edwards. It was moved once more, this time to what was the west end of its overlap with US 11 in De Kalb, in the early 1970s. In 1975, officials from New York State Department of Transportation (NYSDOT) Region 7 proposed eliminating NY 87 in favor of NY 812, a new route that would extend from Lowville to Ogdensburg via Croghan, Harrisville, Gouverneur, and De Kalb. The designation would also supplant NY 26A south of Croghan. The proposed route was part of a larger plan to connect the Delaware River at Deposit to the Ogdensburg–Prescott International Bridge over the Saint Lawrence River by way of as few numbered routes as possible. All of the suggested changes were implemented on July 1, 1977.

When NY 812 was first assigned, it was locally maintained from NY 126 in Croghan to NY 3 in Diana and from NY 3 in Pitcairn to NY 58 in Fowler. The section of the route between NY 126 and the Croghan village line was maintained by the village of Croghan; however, the rest of the two locally maintained sections were maintained by Lewis and St. Lawrence counties. Most of the Lewis County-owned section was co-designated as CR 11; however, the short piece between the Croghan village line and Belfort Road was part of CR 10. In St. Lawrence County, NY 812 was overlaid on the existing CR 73 from NY 3 to Stone Road, CR 99 between Stone Road and Balmat, and CR 56 from Balmat to Fowler. The state of New York assumed ownership and maintenance of NY 812 between Croghan and Diana on April 1, 1980, as part of a highway maintenance swap between the state and Lewis County that transferred NY 194 to the county. Ownership of NY 812 from Pitcairn to Fowler was transferred to the state on September 1, 1982, as part of a highway maintenance swap between the state and St. Lawrence County.

== Major intersections ==
County	Location	mi	km	Destinations	Notes
Lewis	Village of Lowville	0.00	0.00	NY 12 / NY 26 south	Southern terminus; southern terminus of NY 26 / NY 812 overlap
Lewis	Village of Lowville	0.37	0.60	NY 26 north	Northern terminus of NY 26 / NY 812 overlap
Lewis	Village of Croghan	9.90	15.93	NY 126 west – Carthage	Eastern terminus of NY 126
Lewis	Diana	26.65	42.89	NY 3 west – Carthage	Southern terminus of NY 3 / NY 812 overlap
St. Lawrence	Pitcairn	31.09	50.03	NY 3 east – Star Lake	Northern terminus of NY 3 / NY 812 overlap
St. Lawrence	Fowler	41.11	66.16	NY 58 south	Southern terminus of NY 58 / NY 812 overlap
St. Lawrence	Village of Gouverneur	47.20	75.96	US 11 south – Watertown NY 58 north – Morristown	Northern terminus of NY 58 / NY 812 overlap; southern terminus of US 11 / NY 812 overlap
St. Lawrence	De Kalb	58.63	94.36	US 11 north – Canton	Northern terminus of US 11 / NY 812 overlap
St. Lawrence	Heuvelton	70.44	113.36	NY 184 west – Pope Mills	Eastern terminus of NY 184
St. Lawrence	Oswegatchie–Ogdensburg line	76.92	123.79	NY 37 west – Morristown	Western terminus of NY 37 / NY 812 overlap
St. Lawrence	Oswegatchie–Ogdensburg line	76.92	123.79	NY 970E (State Street) – Ogdensburg	Southern terminus of unsigned NY 970E
St. Lawrence	Oswegatchie	77.26	124.34	NY 68 – Ogdensburg, Canton	
St. Lawrence	Ogdensburg	79.33	127.67	NY 37 east – Massena	Eastern terminus of NY 37 / NY 812 overlap
St. Lawrence	Ogdensburg	80.91	130.21	Highway 16	Ogdensburg–Prescott International Bridge; continuation into Ontario
1.000 mi = 1.609 km; 1.000 km = 0.621 mi: Concurrency terminus
