= De Peyster, New York =

DePeyster, New York
- Town
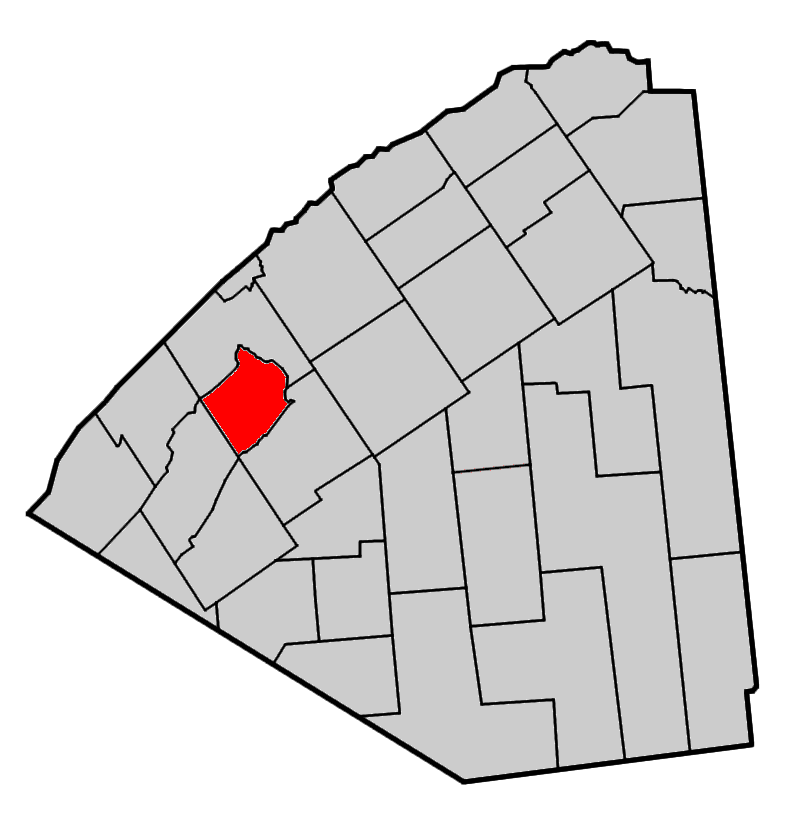
- Map highlighting De Peyster's location within St. Lawrence County.

- Location within the state of New York
- Coordinates: 44°32′32″N 75°27′39″W
- Country: United States
- State: New York
- County: St. Lawrence

Area
  - Total: 45.10 sq mi (116.80 km^{2})
  - Land: 42.93 sq mi (111.18 km^{2})
  - Water: 2.17 sq mi (5.62 km^{2})
- Elevation: 308 ft (94 m)

Population (2020)
  - Total: 1,023
  - Density: 24.2/sq mi (9.36/km^{2})
- Time zone: UTC-5 (Eastern (EST))
  - Summer (DST): UTC-4 (EDT)
- FIPS code: 36-20335
- GNIS feature ID: 0978898

DePeyster is a town in St. Lawrence County, New York, United States. The population was 998 at the 2010 census. The name is taken from that of one of the land owners of the region, Frederic de Peyster, grandfather of John Watts de Peyster.

== History ==
The town was first settled around 1802.

The town was established in 1825 from parts of the Towns of DeKalb and Oswegatchie. The town name was proposed to be "Stilwell" after prominent resident Smith Stilwell, but he declined on the grounds that "some one among the proprietors, might be willing to make the town a liberal present, for the privilege of giving it their name". Thus, a correspondence was opened with landowner Frederic de Peyster, whose name was ultimately chosen for the new town.

== Notable people ==
Newton Martin Curtis, Medal of Honor recipient - born in the town and was a postmaster, brigadier general, and customs inspector.

Patty Ritchie, New York State Senator - raised in DePeyster.

== Geography ==
According to the United States Census Bureau, the town has a total area of 45.1 square miles (117 km^{2}), of which 43.1 square miles (112 km^{2}) is land and 2.0 square miles (5.2 km^{2}) (4.54%) is water.

The northeast town line is defined by the Oswegatchie River and the northwestern town line is defined by Black Lake. Mud Lake is a smaller lake in the southwest of the town. The southeastern town line is marked by Beaver Creek.

New York State Route 812 crosses the northern part of the town. New York State Route 184 is a northeast–southwest highway.

== Demographics ==
Historical population
Census	Pop.	Note	%±
1830	814		—
1840	1,074		31.9%
1850	906		−15.6%
1860	1,249		37.9%
1870	1,138		−8.9%
1880	1,194		4.9%
1890	947		−20.7%
1900	936		−1.2%
1910	907		−3.1%
1920	806		−11.1%
1930	805		−0.1%
1940	768		−4.6%
1950	642		−16.4%
1960	759		18.2%
1970	769		1.3%
1980	917		19.2%
1990	913		−0.4%
2000	936		2.5%
2010	998		6.6%
2020	1,023		2.5%

As of the census of 2000, there were 936 people, 272 households, and 217 families residing in the town. The population density was 21.7 inhabitants per square mile (8.4/km^{2}). There were 307 housing units at an average density of 7.1 per square mile (2.7/km^{2}). The racial makeup of the town was 98.61% White, 1.07% African American, 0.11% Pacific Islander, and 0.21% from two or more races. Hispanic or Latino of any race were 0.43% of the population.

There were 272 households, out of which 42.6% had children under the age of 18 living with them, 69.9% were married couples living together, 7.7% had a female householder with no husband present, and 19.9% were non-families. 16.2% of all households were made up of individuals, and 7.4% had someone living alone who was 65 years of age or older. The average household size was 3.44 and the average family size was 3.89.

In the town, the population was spread out, with 37.3% under the age of 18, 8.8% from 18 to 24, 24.9% from 25 to 44, 20.2% from 45 to 64, and 8.9% who were 65 years of age or older. The median age was 29 years. For every 100 females, there were 104.4 males. For every 100 females age 18 and over, there were 107.4 males.

The median income for a household in the town was $28,750, and the median income for a family was $31,500. Males had a median income of $25,000 versus $21,458 for females. The per capita income for the town was $10,667. About 24.5% of families and 27.2% of the population were below the poverty line, including 36.0% of those under age 18 and 11.8% of those age 65 or over.

== Communities and locations in DePeyster ==
- DePeyster – The hamlet of DePeyster is in the northern part of the town on County Road 10.
- Kokomo Corners – A location west of DePeyster village on NY-184.
- Lower Big Bay – A location on Black Lake.
