= Clara Cleghorn Hoffman =

American temperance activist (1831–1908)

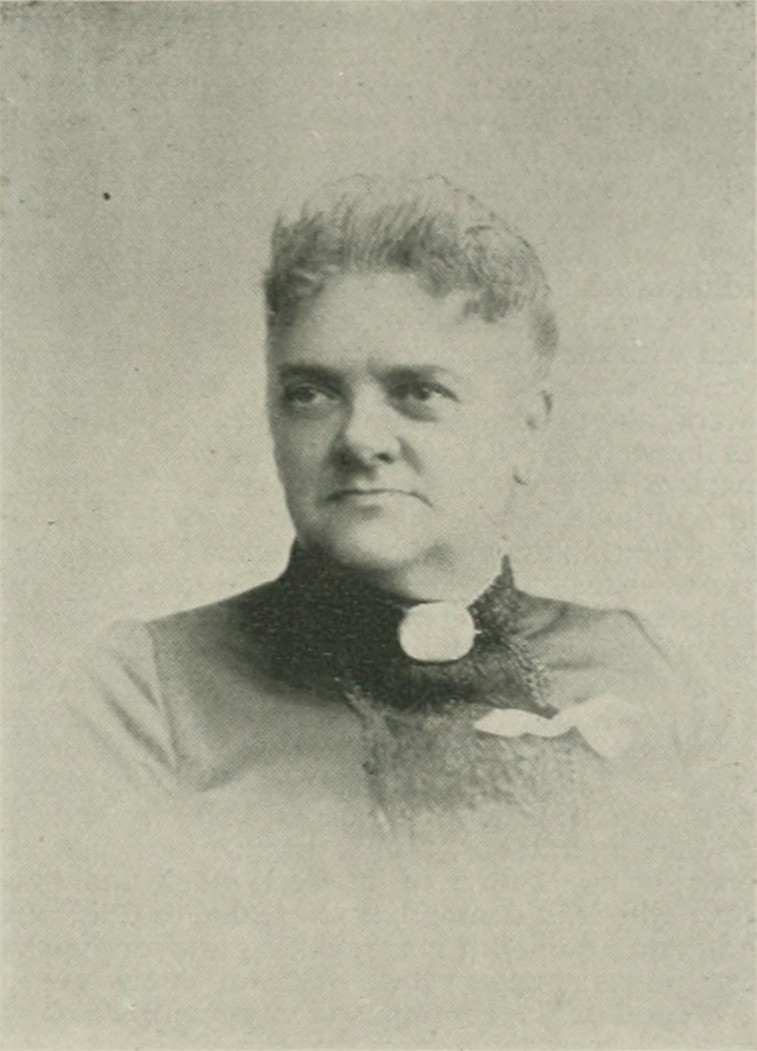
- Portrait photo from "A Woman of the Century"
- Born: Clara Cleghorn; January 18, 1831; De Kalb, New York, U.S.
- Died: February 13, 1908 (aged 77); Kansas City, Missouri, U.S.
- Occupations: educator; temperance reformer
- Known for: President, Missouri Woman's Christian Temperance Union

Clara Cleghorn Hoffman (January 18, 1831 – February 13, 1908) was an American educator and temperance reformer. She became identified with the white-ribbon movement in Kansas City, Missouri, giving up her position as principal of a school to enter the work of the Woman's Christian Temperance Union (WCTU). She served as President of the Missouri WCTU for 25 years. Within the National WCTU, she lectured across the U.S., was chosen Assistant Recording Secretary (Chicago convention, 1893), and Recording Secretary (Cleveland, 1894), succeeding Lillian M. N. Stevens.

== Early life and education ==
Clara Cleghorn was born in De Kalb, New York, January 18, 1831. She was the eleventh child in a family of thirteen children, seven daughters and six sons. She was the daughter of Humphrey Cleghorn, a Scotchman. He was an abolitionist and a conductor on the Underground Railroad in the anti-slavery days. Her mother was Olive Ruruham, daughter of Major Elisha Burnham, who served in the Revolutionary War.

She was educated in the public schools of New York and at Gouverneur Wesleyan Seminary, later pursuing a course of study for two years in Springfield, Massachusetts. She then went to Keokuk, Iowa to live with one of her brothers.

== Career ==
=== Educator ===
In 1861, she was teaching at Columbia, Illinois. The next year, she married the German physician, Dr. Goswin Hoffman, who had emigrated to that city.

In 1869, the couple, with two young sons, removed to Warrensburg, Missouri, and in 1871, to Kansas City, Missouri. She was widowed in 1893, and the elder of their two sons died in 1896.

For 12 years, she was principal of Lathrop School in Kansas City, Missouri.

=== Missouri WCTU ===
In Missouri, work was completed for organizing a Missouri WCTU in 1882. In May of that year, the WCTU members living in the state, met at Hannibal, Missouri and formally organized. At this meeting, Hoffman first met the national president of the WCTU, Frances E. Willard, and they formed a friendship. Frances E. Willard visited Kansas City, and learned more about Hoffman's capabilities and her success as a teacher. At that time, one of the leading merchants in the city, in whose home Willard was entertained, said to her:— "If you have come here to speak and organize a Woman's Christian Temperance Union, you are welcome, but if you have come to spirit away Mrs. Clara Hoffman from our schools, then I, as a member of the school board, have a controversy with you, however cordially I may treat you as my guest."

At the meeting of the National WCTU in Louisville, Kentucky, in the fall of 1882, Hoffman was elected President of the Missouri WCTU by the six Missouri women present. Her election was confirmed by the national body. Hoffman was not present at the Louisville meeting. She resigned her position at Lathrop School to take up the work before her in the cause of prohibition.

The first annual meeting of the Missouri WCTU was held in September 1883. At first little encouragement was given Hoffman and her "White Ribbon" workers-as they were called from the white ribbon badges they wore. Many churches even refused to permit them to deliver speeches in their cause. People were then indifferent to the saloon question. Besides, nearly all the men and women of that day did not think it was proper for women to take up this kind of work. People made fun of the little band of women who said that some day they would close up the saloons of Missouri. In those days saloons were everywhere. Young boys and old men were frequently seen drunk on the public streets of Missouri's towns and cities. Thousands of men spent their weekly wages for beer and whiskey and then went home to their wives and children without money to buy bread, meat and clothing. The saloon not only made physical wrecks of many men thru its intoxicating liquors, but it ruined homes, made paupers of women and children, and even corrupted the government. In spite of little help, Mrs. Hoffman and her "White Ribbon" workers worked year after year. First a town, then a county voted dry. Other counties joined the movement. Finally it spread over the State of Missouri.

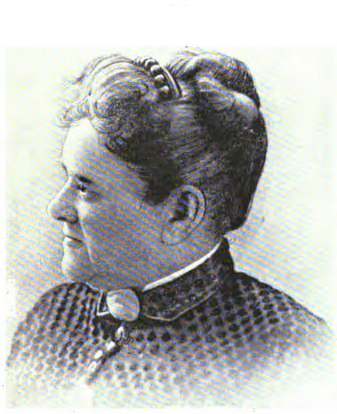
The Temperance Movement (1888)

A frequent writer on reform topics for the newspapers and magazines, her style was notable for pungency and wit. Prohibition platitudes took on the force and compelling power of new discoveries. Boston papers called her "the Western Wendell Phillips".

Every town and village had its local association. Hoffman's labor was almost incessant. She rallied the forces with the skill of a major-general, drilling them with the thoroughness that her long experience as a teacher had caused to become second nature, and inspiring them with zeal. Headquarters were established in Kansas City, where systematic work was planned. Temperance sentiment was cultivated. Improved legislation on many lines was secured, and the good work continued with Hoffman at the head. She was continuously reelected for 19 years.

=== National WCTU ===
Hoffman had intimate friendships with Frances E. Willard, Lady Henry Somerset, Susan B. Anthony, Mary Torrans Lathrap, and others. These connections coupled her speaking and debate abilities displayed at the National WCTU convention, led Hoffman to become a national leader and organizer. She was elected recording secretary of the National WCTU in 1904. Hoffman became a familiar figure in every section of the country. Her personality and work ethic made an impression on her peers. She was one of its fittest by sheer force of intellect, pluck and devotion. She was in demand from Maine to California, and made endless trips, speaking and organizing. Her powers upon the platform were greatly developed. The courage and vigor with which she attacked conservatism made her a tremendous power before an audience.

At the World's Congress of Representative Women (1893) in Chicago, Hoffman delivered an address entitled, "A Bird's-Eye View of the National Woman's Christian Temperance Union". She was the delegate of the National WCTU at the International Council of Women in Washington, D.C. (1888). She was one of the most honored delegates at the Council's London convention (1899). After the convention, Hoffman traveled and lectured for eight months in England, Germany, France and Switzerland.

Hoffman wanted woman to read widely on public questions, to inform herself on what the government is doing as well as on the latest style in dresses. She hoped that someday woman would be permitted to vote. When that day came, she said the saloon would go. Such a person, be it man or woman, naturally makes enemies. Hoffman was no exception. Although she had friends by the thousands, she also made enemies.

== Death and legacy ==
Her health failing, Hoffman suffered an attack of pneumonia in 1908, and after an illness of four weeks, died on February 13, 1908, in Kansas City.

A biography with several memorial tributes was compiled by Carrie Lee Carter-Stokes, under the title Clara C. Hoffman, Prophet and Pioneer (Kansas City, n.d.).

Hoffman was the only woman included in Floyd Calvin Shoemaker's Missouri's Hall of Fame: Lives of Eminent Missourians (1923).

In the reading room of The State Historical Society of Missouri, at Columbia, is a marble bust statue of Hoffman. It was made by the St. Louis sculptor, Prof. George J. Zolnay. Below the statue are these words:

"Missouri's Great Heart"
Clara C. Hoffman
President Missouri
Woman's Christian Temperance Union For
Twenty-five Years
