= Edwards Town Hall =

- U.S. National Register of Historic Places
- Location within New York Location within the United States
- Location: 161 Main St., Edwards, New York
- Coordinates: 44°19′29″N 75°15′7″W
- Area: less than one acre
- Built: 1896
- Architect: Grant, William; Williams, Samuel D.P.
- Architectural style: Late 19th And 20th Century Revivals
- NRHP reference No.: 04000752
- Added to NRHP: July 28, 2004

Edwards Town Hall is a historic town hall building located at Edwards in St. Lawrence County, New York. It was built in 1896 and is a two-story, rectangular brick building, 43 feet wide and 79 feet long. It features a prominent square tower and central gable.

It was listed on the National Register of Historic Places in 2004.
