= Pleasant Lake (Macomb, St. Lawrence County, New York) =

Lake in Macomb, St. Lawrence County, New York, United States

- Location within New York Pleasant Lake (the United States)
- Location: St. Lawrence County, New York, U.S.
- Coordinates: 44°23′17″N 75°36′16″W
- Primary outflows: Indian River
- Basin countries: United States
- Surface area: 236 acres (0.96 km^{2})
- Average depth: 22 feet (6.7 m)
- Max. depth: 32 feet (9.8 m)
- Shore length^{1}: 3.4 miles (5.5 km)
- Surface elevation: 335 feet (102 m)
- Islands: 1
- Settlements: Brasie Corners, New York
- ^{1} Shore length is not a well-defined measure.

Pleasant Lake is located by Brasie Corners, Macomb, St. Lawrence County, New York. The outlet creek flows into the Indian River.

Fish species present in the lake are largemouth bass, northern pike, yellow perch, bluegill, and walleye. There is a town owned boat launch located on Pleasant Lake Road.
