= Edwards (CDP), New York =

Edwards, New York
- Hamlet and CDP
- Location within the state of New York
- Coordinates: 44°19′25″N 75°15′11″W
- Country: United States
- State: New York
- County: St. Lawrence
- Town: Edwards
- Settled: 1814
- Village dissolution: December 31, 2012

Area
  - Total: 0.96 sq mi (2.49 km^{2})
  - Land: 0.93 sq mi (2.40 km^{2})
  - Water: 0.039 sq mi (0.10 km^{2})
- Elevation: 669 ft (204 m)

Population (2020)
  - Total: 361
  - Density: 390/sq mi (150.7/km^{2})
- Time zone: UTC-5 (Eastern (EST))
  - Summer (DST): UTC-4 (EDT)
- FIPS code: 36-23635
- GNIS feature ID: 2761297

Edwards is a hamlet (and census-designated place) in St. Lawrence County, New York, United States. The population was 439 at the 2010 census. It was an incorporated village until dissolution in 2012.

The hamlet is in the northeast corner of the Town of Edwards. Both the former village and surrounding town are near the south county line.

== History ==
The village was originally settled on a river island, but expanded onto the mainland to take advantage of the "Russell Turnpike," a military road. The first structure, a grist mill, was erected in the future village in 1814, giving the future village its first name "Sheads Mill."

A destructive fire in 1894 destroyed much of the village.

On Tuesday, March 15, 2011, village voters decided to dissolve the village into the surrounding town by a vote of 55 to 9 in favor. The village was dissolved on December 31, 2012, and on January 1, 2013, the Town of Edwards assumed responsibility for the former village.

== Geography ==
Edwards is located at 44°19′25″N 75°15′10″W (44.323659, -75.252926).

According to the United States Census Bureau, the village has a total area of 1.0 square mile (2.6 km^{2}), of which 1.0 square mile (2.5 km^{2}) is land and 1.01% is water.

The village is by the junction of County Roads 19 and 24, north of New York State Route 58.

The Oswegatchie River flows westward past the village.

== Demographics ==
Historical population
Census	Pop.	Note	%±
2020	361		—
U.S. Decennial Census

As of the census of 2000, there were 465 people, 177 households, and 118 families residing in the village. The population density was 477.2 inhabitants per square mile (184.2/km^{2}). There were 192 housing units at an average density of 197.0 per square mile (76.1/km^{2}). The racial makeup of the village was 96.77% White, 0.43% Black or African American, 0.65% Native American, 0.22% from other races, and 1.94% from two or more races. Hispanic or Latino of any race were 1.29% of the population.

There were 177 households, out of which 35.6% had children under the age of 18 living with them, 50.3% were married couples living together, 13.0% had a female householder with no husband present, and 32.8% were non-families. 27.1% of all households were made up of individuals, and 18.1% had someone living alone who was 65 years of age or older. The average household size was 2.63 and the average family size was 3.20.

In the village, the population was spread out, with 29.5% under the age of 18, 7.3% from 18 to 24, 27.5% from 25 to 44, 19.1% from 45 to 64, and 16.6% who were 65 years of age or older. The median age was 35 years. For every 100 females, there were 90.6 males. For every 100 females age 18 and over, there were 86.4 males.

The median income for a household in the village was $30,682, and the median income for a family was $35,417. Males had a median income of $30,938 versus $18,889 for females. The per capita income for the village was $11,613. About 15.8% of families and 16.8% of the population were below the poverty line, including 20.4% of those under age 18 and 11.6% of those age 65 or over.

== Education ==
The census-designated place is in the Edwards-Knox Central School District.
