= Richville, New York =

- Village
- Location within the state of New York
- Coordinates: 44°24′46″N 75°23′37″W
- Country: United States
- State: New York
- County: St. Lawrence

Area
  - Total: 0.74 sq mi (1.91 km^{2})
  - Land: 0.74 sq mi (1.91 km^{2})
  - Water: 0 sq mi (0.00 km^{2})
- Elevation: 407 ft (124 m)

Population (2020)
  - Total: 234
  - Density: 316.9/sq mi (122.37/km^{2})
- Time zone: UTC-5 (Eastern (EST))
  - Summer (DST): UTC-4 (EDT)
- FIPS code: 36-61621
- GNIS feature ID: 0976888

Richville is a village in St. Lawrence County, New York, United States. As of the 2020 census, Richville had a population of 234. The name is taken from an early settler.

The Village of Richville is in the southwestern corner of the Town of De Kalb and is southwest of the Village of Canton.

== Geography ==
Richville is located at 44°24′46″N 75°23′37″W (44.412874, -75.393608).

According to the United States Census Bureau, the village has a total area of 0.7 square miles (1.8 km^{2}), all land.

Richville is located on U.S. Route 11, which is conjoined with New York State Route 812 in the village.

The Oswegatchie River flows northward past the western side of the village.

== Demographics ==
Historical population
Census	Pop.	Note	%±
1880	339		—
1890	336		−0.9%
1900	331		−1.5%
1910	307		−7.3%
1920	302		−1.6%
1930	302		0.0%
1940	274		−9.3%
1950	254		−7.3%
1960	292		15.0%
1970	334		14.4%
1980	336		0.6%
1990	311		−7.4%
2000	274		−11.9%
2010	323		17.9%
2020	234		−27.6%
U.S. Decennial Census

As of the census of 2000, there were 274 people, 109 households, and 80 families residing in the village. The population density was 371.4 inhabitants per square mile (143.4/km^{2}). There were 120 housing units at an average density of 162.7 units per square mile (62.8 units/km^{2}). The racial makeup of the village was 98.91% White, 0.73% African American and 0.36% Native American.

There were 109 households, out of which 33.9% had children under the age of 18 living with them, 56.9% were married couples living together, 10.1% had a female householder with no husband present, and 25.7% were non-families. 20.2% of all households were made up of individuals, and 5.5% had someone living alone who was 65 years of age or older. The average household size was 2.51 and the average family size was 2.89.

In the village, the population was spread out, with 23.7% under the age of 18, 9.5% from 18 to 24, 32.8% from 25 to 44, 21.5% from 45 to 64, and 12.4% who were 65 years of age or older. The median age was 37 years. For every 100 females, there were 101.5 males. For every 100 females age 18 and over, there were 99.0 males.

The median income for a household in the village was $35,455, and the median income for a family was $39,375. Males had a median income of $35,938 versus $21,500 for females. The per capita income for the village was $16,040. About 8.6% of families and 7.4% of the population were below the poverty line, including 4.4% of those under the age of eighteen and 8.8% of those 65 or over.

== Education ==
The village is in the Gouverneur Central School District.
