= Sylvia Lake =

- Location within New York Sylvia Lake (the United States)
- Location: St. Lawrence County, New York, United States
- Coordinates: 44°15′12″N 75°24′49″W
- Type: Lake
- Basin countries: United States
- Surface area: 317 acres (1.28 km^{2})
- Average depth: 70 feet (21 m)
- Max. depth: 142 feet (43 m)
- Shore length^{1}: 4.1 miles (6.6 km)
- Surface elevation: 653 feet (199 m)
- Settlements: Balmat, New York
- ^{1} Shore length is not a well-defined measure.

Sylvia Lake is located near Balmat, New York. Fish species present in the lake are largemouth bass, smallmouth bass, lake trout, rainbow trout, landlocked salmon, and black bullhead. There is a state owned beach launch on Route 812 between Fowler and Balmat.
