= Hermon, New York =

Hermon
- Town
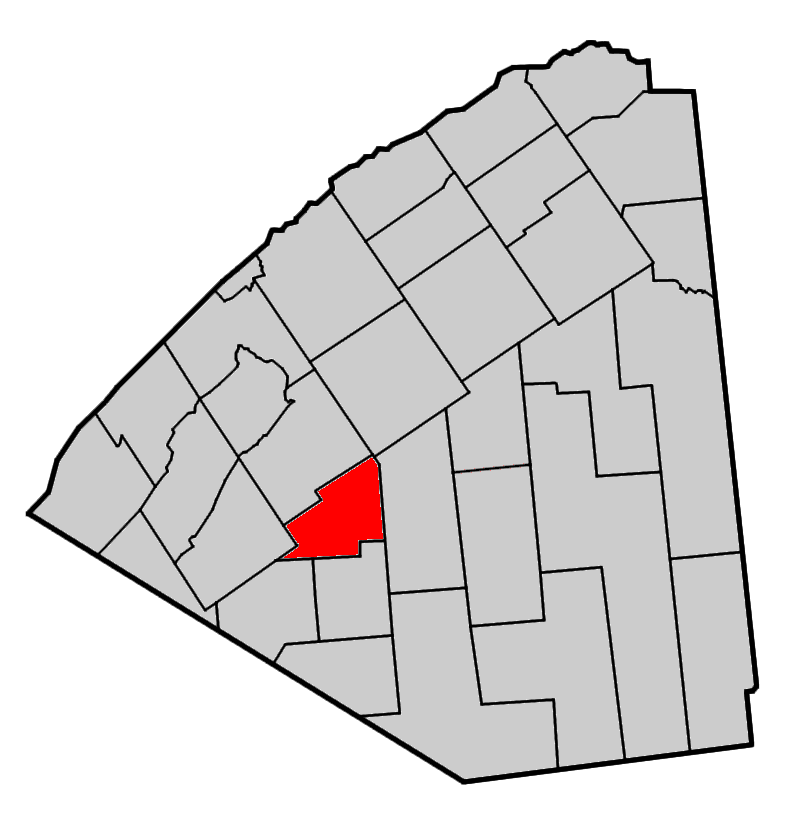
- Map highlighting Hermon's location within St. Lawrence County.

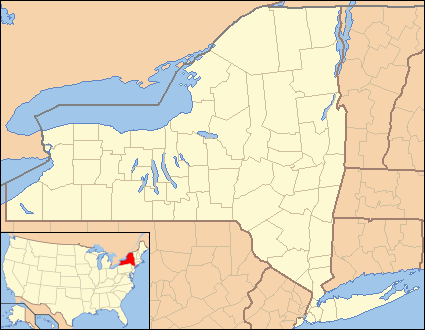
- Location within the state of New York
- Coordinates: 44°28′01″N 75°13′45″W
- Country: United States
- State: New York
- County: St. Lawrence

Area
  - Total: 54.22 sq mi (140.44 km^{2})
  - Land: 53.15 sq mi (137.65 km^{2})
  - Water: 1.08 sq mi (2.80 km^{2}) 1.38%

Population (2020)
  - Total: 1,074
  - Estimate (2016): 1,072
  - Density: 20.21/sq mi (7.802/km^{2})
- Time zone: UTC-5 (Eastern (EST))
  - Summer (DST): UTC-4 (EDT)
- FIPS code: 36-089-34176
- Website: https://www.hermonny.org/

Hermon is a town in St. Lawrence County, New York, United States. The population was 1,108 at the 2010 census. Hermon is named after Mount Hermon in Israel, which is the name corresponding to Mount Jabal al-Sheikh in Syria. The town contains a hamlet also called Hermon, and is in the south-central part of the county, southwest of Canton.

== History ==
The town was established in 1830 as the "Town of Depeau" from the towns of De Kalb and Edwards. In 1834 the town's name was changed to Hermon, after a post office in the town, due to the presence of another location named after Francis Depeau. In 1852, Hermon reached its current size after a small part from its southeast corner was moved to the town of Edwards.

The community of Hermon was set off from the town in 1887 by being incorporated as a village, which was dissolved in 2016.

== Geography ==
According to the United States Census Bureau, the town has a total area of 54.2 square miles (140.4 km^{2}), of which 53.4 square miles (138.4 km^{2}) is land and 0.8 square miles (1.9 km^{2}) (1.38%) is water. It contains the hamlet and census-designated place of Hermon.

== Demographics ==
Historical population
Census	Pop.	Note	%±
1830	668		—
1840	1,271		90.3%
1850	1,690		33.0%
1860	1,690		0.0%
1870	1,702		0.7%
1880	1,634		−4.0%
1890	1,521		−6.9%
1900	1,542		1.4%
1910	1,526		−1.0%
1920	1,505		−1.4%
1930	1,356		−9.9%
1940	1,147		−15.4%
1950	1,350		17.7%
1960	1,255		−7.0%
1970	1,087		−13.4%
1980	1,083		−0.4%
1990	1,041		−3.9%
2000	1,069		2.7%
2010	1,108		3.6%
2020	1,074		−3.1%
U.S. Decennial Census

At the 2020 census, there were 1,074 people, 419 households and 293 families residing in the town. The population density was 19.8 per square mile (7.6/km^{2}). There were 637 housing units at an average density of 11.1 per square mile (4.3/km^{2}). The racial make-up of the town was 94.3% white, 1.4% black or African American, 0.5% Native American, 0.1% Asian, and 3.4% from two or more races. Hispanic or Latino of any race were 1.2% of the population.

There were 419 households, of which 30.5% had children under the age of 18 living with them, 49.4% were married couples living together, 21.2% had a female householder with no husband present, and 30.1% were non-families. 23.9% of all households were made up of individuals, and 9.8% had someone living alone who was 65 years of age or older. The average household size was 2.56 and the average family size was 3.15.

24.0% of the population were under the age of 18, 6.3% from 18 to 24, 18.7% from 25 to 44, 28.7% from 45 to 64, and 22.3% 65 years of age or older. The median age was 39 years. For every 100 females, there were 97.4 males. For every 100 females age 18 and over, there were 96.2 males.

The median household income was $49,667 and the median family income was $59,271. Males had a median income of $40,385 and females $26,118. The per capita income was $24,979. About 4.5% of families and 9.9% of the population were below the poverty line, including 8.4% of those under age 18 and 14.1% of those age 65 or over.
