= De Kalb, New York =

DeKalb, New York
- Town
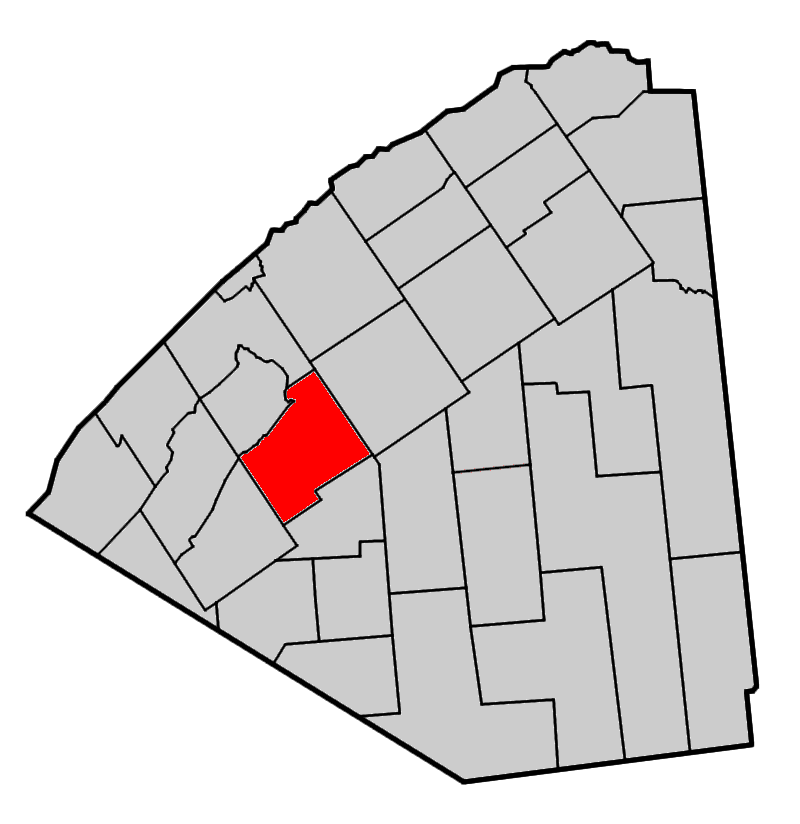
- Map highlighting De Kalb's location within St. Lawrence County.

- Location within the state of New York
- Coordinates: 44°28′18″N 75°21′10″W
- Country: United States
- State: New York
- County: St. Lawrence
- Named after: Johann de Kalb

Area
  - Total: 83.21 sq mi (215.50 km^{2})
  - Land: 82.52 sq mi (213.73 km^{2})
  - Water: 0.68 sq mi (1.77 km^{2})
- Elevation: 302 ft (92 m)

Population (2020)
  - Total: 2,375
  - Density: 28.8/sq mi (11.13/km^{2})
- Time zone: UTC-5 (Eastern (EST))
  - Summer (DST): UTC-4 (EDT)
- FIPS code: 36-20038
- GNIS feature ID: 0978893
- Website: https://www.townofdekalb.com/

DeKalb is a town in St. Lawrence County, New York, United States. The population was 2,375 at the 2020 census, down from 2,434 at the 2010 census. The town is named after American general Baron de Kalb, a German officer serving under George Washington.

The Town of DeKalb is in the southwest part of the county and is southwest of the Village of Canton.

== History ==
Settlement began in June 1803, when the first settlement party arrived, led by Judge William Cooper of Cooperstown, New York.

The town was organized in 1806 from the town of Oswegatchie. DeKalb was one of the original ten towns of the county. In 1825, the part of DeKalb north west of Beaver Creek was taken to be part of the Town of DePeyster. In 1830, the Southeastern corner of DeKalb was made part of the Town of Hermon.

St. Regis and St. François Native Americans used to frequently visit the settlement on hunting expeditions.

== Geography ==
According to the United States Census Bureau, the town has a total area of 83.2 square miles (215 km^{2}), of which 82.5 square miles (214 km^{2}) is land and 0.7 square miles (1.8 km^{2}) (0.82%) is water.

The Oswegatchie River flows through the western part of the town. Beaver Creek defines the northwestern town line.

U.S. Route 11 is a northeast–southwest highway in the south part of the town. New York State Route 812 intersects US-11 south of DeKalb village.

== Demographics ==
Historical population
Census	Pop.	Note	%±
1820	709		—
1830	1,060		49.5%
1840	1,531		44.4%
1850	2,389		56.0%
1860	3,182		33.2%
1870	3,116		−2.1%
1880	3,027		−2.9%
1890	2,840		−6.2%
1900	2,723		−4.1%
1910	2,516		−7.6%
1920	2,419		−3.9%
1930	2,346		−3.0%
1940	2,116		−9.8%
1950	2,063		−2.5%
1960	2,137		3.6%
1970	2,062		−3.5%
1980	2,130		3.3%
1990	2,153		1.1%
2000	2,213		2.8%
2010	2,434		10.0%
2020	2,375		−2.4%

As of the census of 2000, there were 2,213 people, 792 households, and 582 families residing in the town. The population density was 26.8 inhabitants per square mile (10.3/km^{2}). There were 889 housing units at an average density of 10.8 units per square mile (4.2 units/km^{2}). The racial makeup of the town was 98.19% White, 0.27% African American, 0.27% Native American, 0.09% Asian, 0.32% from other races, and 0.86% from two or more races. Hispanic or Latino of any race were 0.27% of the population.

There were 792 households, out of which 37.4% had children under the age of 18 living with them, 57.4% were married couples living together, 9.6% had a female householder with no husband present, and 26.4% were non-families. 21.1% of all households were made up of individuals, and 8.2% had someone living alone who was 65 years of age or older. The average household size was 2.79 and the average family size was 3.23.

In the town, the population was spread out, with 30.2% under the age of 18, 8.5% from 18 to 24, 27.5% from 25 to 44, 23.4% from 45 to 64, and 10.3% who were 65 years of age or older. The median age was 34 years. For every 100 females, there were 101.0 males. For every 100 females age 18 and over, there were 102.1 males.

The median income for a household in the town was $33,173, and the median income for a family was $37,463. Males had a median income of $29,000 versus $23,050 for females. The per capita income for the town was $13,742. About 11.4% of families and 15.7% of the population were below the poverty line, including 23.2% of those under age 18 and 9.8% of those age 65 or over.

== Notable people ==
- Clara Cleghorn Hoffman (1831–1908), temperance activist
- Clarence Page Townsley, U.S. Army major general who served as Superintendent of the United States Military Academy.
- Ozora Pierson Stearns (1831-1896), United States senator from Minnesota, born in DeKalb.

== Communities and locations in DeKalb ==
- Bigelow – A hamlet east of Richville on County Road 20.
- Cooper Falls – A hamlet north of DeKalb village on NY-812.
- DeKalb – The hamlet of DeKalb in the north part of the town on NY-812. The original name was Coopers Village or Williamstown, after Judge William Cooper, the father of James Fenimore Cooper, who organized the settlement of the town. The community was founded in 1803.
- DeKalb Junction – A former railroad center in the town, located northeast of East De Kalb on US-11 at the intersection of County Road 17. Community growth began in 1862 with the establishment of a spur rail line to Ogdensburg.
- East DeKalb – A hamlet southeast of DeKalb village, located on US-11. Was the economic center of this portion of the town before the establishment of DeKalb Junction.
- Huckleberry Mountain – An elevation by the western town line.
- Kendrew Corners – A location north of Cooper Falls on NY-812 on the western side of the Oswegatchie River; named for Thomas Kendrew.
- Osbornville – A hamlet in the northwestern corner of the township on County Route 11.
- Richville – The Village of Richville is in the southwestern part of the town, located on US-11.
- Snowshoe Island – A location in the Oswegatchie River north of Richville.
- Spooner Flat – A location in the southwestern part of DeKalb, northwest of Richville.
- Stellaville – A hamlet at the eastern corner of DeKalb on County Road 17.
