= Macomb, New York =

- Town
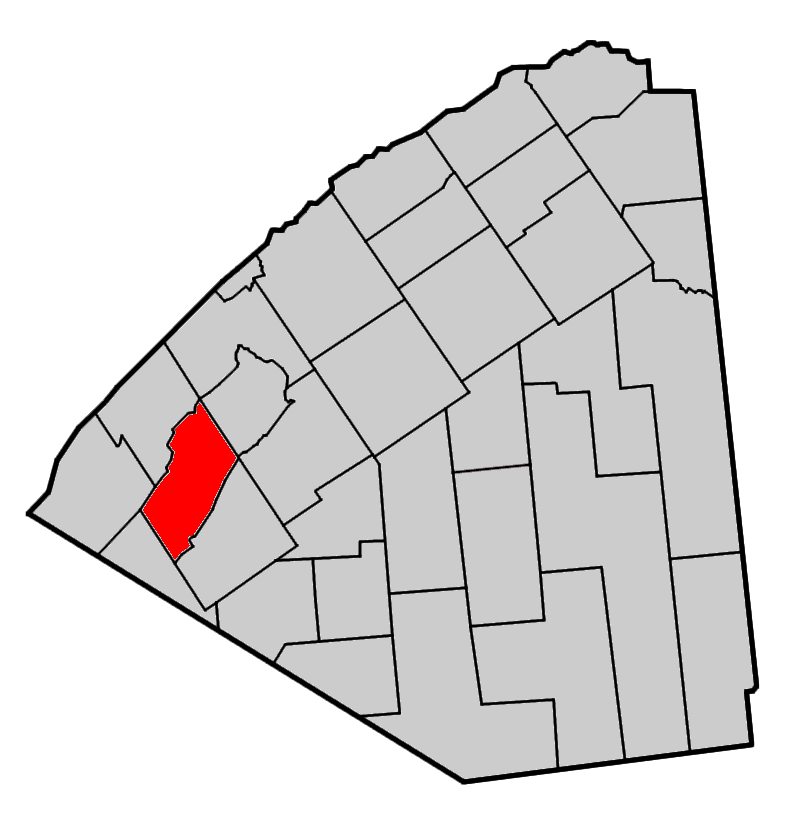
- Map highlighting Macomb's location within St. Lawrence County.

- Location within the state of New York
- Coordinates: 44°28′0″N 75°34′55″W
- Country: United States
- State: New York
- County: St. Lawrence

Area
  - Total: 63.15 sq mi (163.55 km^{2})
  - Land: 60.72 sq mi (157.26 km^{2})
  - Water: 2.43 sq mi (6.29 km^{2})
- Elevation: 302 ft (92 m)

Population (2020)
  - Total: 912
  - Density: 14.6/sq mi (5.64/km^{2})
- Time zone: UTC-5 (Eastern (EST))
  - Summer (DST): UTC-4 (EDT)
- FIPS code: 36-44391
- GNIS feature ID: 0979181
- Website: https://townofmacomb.org/

Macomb is a town in St. Lawrence County, New York, United States. The population was 906 at the 2010 census. The town is named after Alexander Macomb, who once owned much of northern New York as Macomb's Purchase.

The Town of Macomb is in the northwestern part of the county and is northwest of Gouverneur.

== History ==
The first settlers of the region arrived after 1810, though early farmsteads had traces of trench enclosures and hearths, suggesting previous Native American settlement of the area.

The town was formed in 1841 from parts of the Towns of Gouverneur and Morristown. In 1842, a small part of the Town of Hammond was added to Macomb.

Mining was an early industrial activity in Macomb, with the St. Lawrence Lead Mining Company having been based nearby.

== Geography ==
According to the United States Census Bureau, the town has a total area of 63.2 square miles (164 km^{2}), of which 61.2 square miles (159 km^{2}) is land and 1.9 square miles (4.9 km^{2}) (3.07%) is water.

The northwestern part of the town borders Black Lake, which defines the northern town line. The southeastern town line is defined by Beaver Creek.

New York State Route 58 is a north–south highway, which intersects New York State Route 184 at Popes Mills.

== Demographics ==
Historical population
| Census | Pop. | Note | %± |
|---|---|---|---|
| 1850 | 1,197 | | — |
| 1860 | 1,816 | | 51.7% |
| 1870 | 1,673 | | −7.9% |
| 1880 | 1,731 | | 3.5% |
| 1890 | 1,415 | | −18.3% |
| 1900 | 1,374 | | −2.9% |
| 1910 | 1,168 | | −15.0% |
| 1920 | 1,055 | | −9.7% |
| 1930 | 953 | | −9.7% |
| 1940 | 891 | | −6.5% |
| 1950 | 848 | | −4.8% |
| 1960 | 881 | | 3.9% |
| 1970 | 813 | | −7.7% |
| 1980 | 816 | | 0.4% |
| 1990 | 790 | | −3.2% |
| 2000 | 846 | | 7.1% |
| 2010 | 906 | | 7.1% |
| 2020 | 912 | | 0.7% |

As of the census of 2000, there were 846 people, 310 households, and 226 families residing in the town. The population density was 13.8 inhabitants per square mile (5.3/km^{2}). There were 864 housing units at an average density of 14.1 per square mile (5.4/km^{2}). The racial makeup of the town was 97.75% White, 1.06% Native American, 0.12% Asian, 0.12% from other races, and 0.95% from two or more races. Hispanic or Latino of any race were 0.47% of the population.

There were 310 households, out of which 35.2% had children under the age of 18 living with them, 61.0% were married couples living together, 7.1% had a female householder with no husband present, and 26.8% were non-families. 19.0% of all households were made up of individuals, and 7.1% had someone living alone who was 65 years of age or older. The average household size was 2.73 and the average family size was 3.13.

In the town, the population was spread out, with 27.2% under the age of 18, 8.7% from 18 to 24, 27.0% from 25 to 44, 24.5% from 45 to 64, and 12.6% who were 65 years of age or older. The median age was 37 years. For every 100 females, there were 107.9 males. For every 100 females age 18 and over, there were 101.3 males.

The median income for a household in the town was $32,115, and the median income for a family was $33,750. Males had a median income of $27,188 versus $18,625 for females. The per capita income for the town was $12,526. About 11.9% of families and 20.2% of the population were below the poverty line, including 25.2% of those under age 18 and 20.2% of those age 65 or over.

== Communities and locations in Macomb ==
- Apple Island – A small island at the southwestern end of Black Lake.
- Booths Island – A small island in Black Lake near the northwestern part of Macomb.
- Brasie Corners – A hamlet on NY-58 in the southern part of the town.
- Fish Creek Wildlife Management Area – A conservation area south of Black Lake.
- Grindstone Bay – A bay at the southwestern end of Black Lake.
- Hickory Lake – A lake in the eastern corner of the town.
- Jennies Island – A small island in Black Lake near the northwestern part of Macomb.
- Mitchell Bay – A small bay on Black Lake near the northwestern part of Macomb.
- Pierces Corners – A location near the southeastern town line at County Roads 7 and 10.
- Pleasant Lake – A lake in the southern part of the town, south of Brasie Corners.
- Pope Mills – A hamlet in the northern part of the town at the junction of NY-58 and 184. The community name is from settler Timothy Pope.
- Ruby Corner – A hamlet near the northwestern town line on NY-58, south of Black Lake.
- Upper Big Bay – A small bay on Black Lake.
- Yellow Lake – The eastern end of the lake is at the western town line.
