= Fowler, New York =

Town in New York, US

- Town
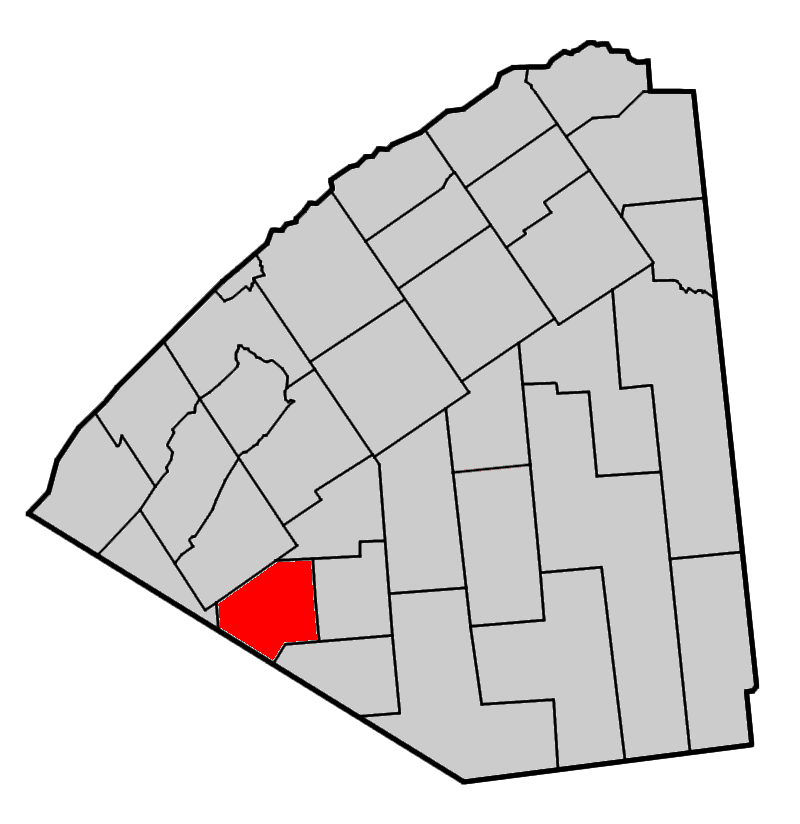
- Map highlighting Fowler's location within St. Lawrence County.

- Location within the state of New York
- Coordinates: 44°17′N 75°24′W
- Country: United States
- State: New York
- County: St. Lawrence

Area
  - Total: 60.57 sq mi (156.88 km^{2})
  - Land: 59.17 sq mi (153.26 km^{2})
  - Water: 1.40 sq mi (3.62 km^{2})
- Elevation: 594 ft (181 m)

Population (2020)
  - Total: 2,142
  - Density: 35.7/sq mi (13.77/km^{2})
- Time zone: UTC-5 (Eastern (EST))
  - Summer (DST): UTC-4 (EDT)
- FIPS code: 36-27100
- GNIS feature ID: 0978968
- Website: Town website

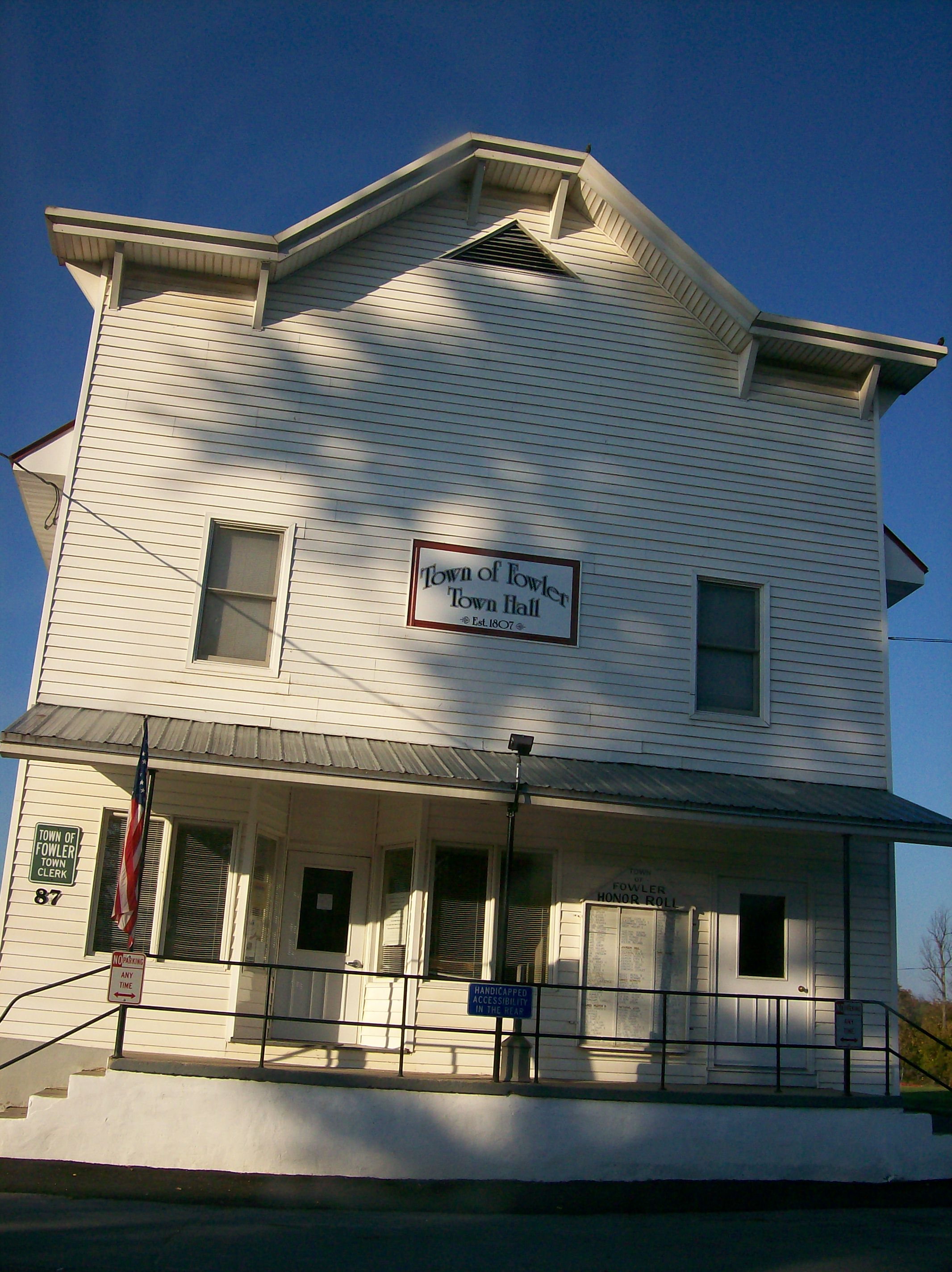
Fowler Town Hall

Fowler is a town in St. Lawrence County, New York, United States. The population was 2,202 at the 2010 census.

The Town of Fowler is located on the southwestern border of the county and is southwest of Canton and southeast of Gouverneur.

== History ==
Fowler was established in 1816, when it was formed from parts of the towns of Rossie and Russell. The first settler was Brigadier General James Haile, who purchased a square mile of land in June 1807. Construction of mills on the river began later that year, and a furnace began operating in 1833. Many families fled during the War of 1812, and rapid settlement only began in 1820.

It was named for Theodosius Fowler (1753–1841), a captain in the American Revolution and a local landowner. In 1827, part of Fowler was transferred to the Town of Edwards. Fowler lost more area to Pitcairn, New York in 1836. By 1870, the population of Fowler was 1,785.

In 1987, the Hollow Dam on the West Branch of the Oswegatchie River was constructed. It generates 900 kilowatts of power.

== Geography ==
According to the United States Census Bureau, the town has a total area of 60.7 square miles (157 km^{2}), of which 59.5 square miles (154 km^{2}) is land and 1.2 square miles (3.1 km^{2}) (1.94%) is water.

The southern town line is the border of Jefferson and Lewis counties.

The Oswegatchie River flows across the northern part of the town.

New York State Route 58 intersects New York State Route 812 by Fowler village.

== Demographics ==
Historical population
| Census | Pop. | Note | %± |
|---|---|---|---|
| 1820 | 605 | | — |
| 1830 | 1,447 | | 139.2% |
| 1840 | 1,752 | | 21.1% |
| 1850 | 1,813 | | 3.5% |
| 1860 | 1,808 | | −0.3% |
| 1870 | 1,785 | | −1.3% |
| 1880 | 1,590 | | −10.9% |
| 1890 | 1,592 | | 0.1% |
| 1900 | 1,716 | | 7.8% |
| 1910 | 1,655 | | −3.6% |
| 1920 | 1,310 | | −20.8% |
| 1930 | 1,608 | | 22.7% |
| 1940 | 1,772 | | 10.2% |
| 1950 | 1,602 | | −9.6% |
| 1960 | 1,722 | | 7.5% |
| 1970 | 1,576 | | −8.5% |
| 1980 | 1,721 | | 9.2% |
| 1990 | 1,885 | | 9.5% |
| 2000 | 2,180 | | 15.6% |
| 2010 | 2,202 | | 1.0% |
| 2020 | 2,142 | | −2.7% |

As of the census of 2000, there were 2,180 people, 811 households, and 616 families residing in the town. The population density was 36.6 inhabitants per square mile (14.1/km^{2}). There were 1,020 housing units at an average density of 17.1 per square mile (6.6/km^{2}). The racial makeup of the town was 99.27% White, 0.09% African American, 0.28% Native American, 0.09% Asian, and 0.28% from two or more races. Hispanic or Latino of any race were 0.55% of the population.

There were 811 households, out of which 37.4% had children under the age of 18 living with them, 63.7% were married couples living together, 7.8% had a female householder with no husband present, and 24.0% were non-families. 19.5% of all households were made up of individuals, and 8.1% had someone living alone who was 65 years of age or older. The average household size was 2.68 and the average family size was 3.05.

In the town, the population was spread out, with 27.8% under the age of 18, 6.1% from 18 to 24, 30.9% from 25 to 44, 23.9% from 45 to 64, and 11.3% who were 65 years of age or older. The median age was 36 years. For every 100 females, there were 101.5 males. For every 100 females age 18 and over, there were 99.1 males.

The median income for a household in the town was $35,844, and the median income for a family was $38,750. Males had a median income of $32,339 versus $20,521 for females. The per capita income for the town was $15,322. About 9.6% of families and 12.0% of the population were below the poverty line, including 15.9% of those under age 18 and 11.7% of those age 65 or over.

== Communities and locations in Fowler ==
- Balmat – A hamlet south of Fowler village on County Road 24 and NY-812.
- Fowler – The village of Fowler is centrally located in the town and is at the junction of Routes NY-58 and NY-812.
- Emeryville – A hamlet northeast of Fowler village on County Road 22, on the bank of the Oswegatchie River.
- Fullerville – A hamlet northeast of Balmat on County Road 24.
- Hailesboro – A hamlet in the northwestern corner of the town on NY-58. It is named after early landowner Gen. James Haile.
- Kellog Corners – A location southwest of Balmat on County Road 24 and south of Sylvia Lake.
- Little York – A former community near Fowler village.
- Pikes Corner – A hamlet at the western town line on County Road 5.
- Sylvia Lake – A lake west of Balmat, once called "Lake Killarney."
- West Fowler – A hamlet west of Fowler village on County Road 22.
