= New York State Route 58 =

Highway in New York

New York State Route 58
- Map of northern New York State with NY 58 highlighted in red

Route information
- Maintained by NYSDOT
- Length: 46.00 mi (74.03 km)
- Existed: 1930–present

Major junctions
- South end: NY 3 in Fine
- North end: NY 37 in Morristown

Location
- Country: United States
- State: New York
- Counties: St. Lawrence

Highway system
- New York Highways; Interstate; US; State; Reference; Parkways
← NY 57	→ NY 59

New York State Route 58 (NY 58) is a north–south state highway located in St. Lawrence County, New York, in the United States. The highway runs in a northwest to southeast direction as it traverses the county. The southern terminus of the route is at a junction with NY 3 in the hamlet of Fine within the town of the same name. Its northern terminus is at an intersection with NY 37 near the St. Lawrence River in the hamlet of Morristown. Part of NY 58 passes through the Adirondack Mountains.

== Route description ==
=== Fine to Gouverneur town ===
NY 58 begins at an intersection with NY 3 in the town of Fine within the Adirondack Park. NY 58 proceeds immediately northward from NY 3, crossing a creek and into the hamlet of Fine. In Fine, NY 58 bends westward, intersecting with County Route 27A (CR 27A). NY 58 becomes a two-lane residential street before bending northwest out of the hamlet. For a distance after the hamlet, NY 58 remains residential, soon succumbing to dense woods before leaving the Adirondack Park near an intersection with Colony Road. After leaving the Adirondack Park, NY 58 bends northward into the town of Edwards, becoming a two-lane residential street before intersecting with the northern terminus of CR 23 (East Pitcairn–South Edwards Road).

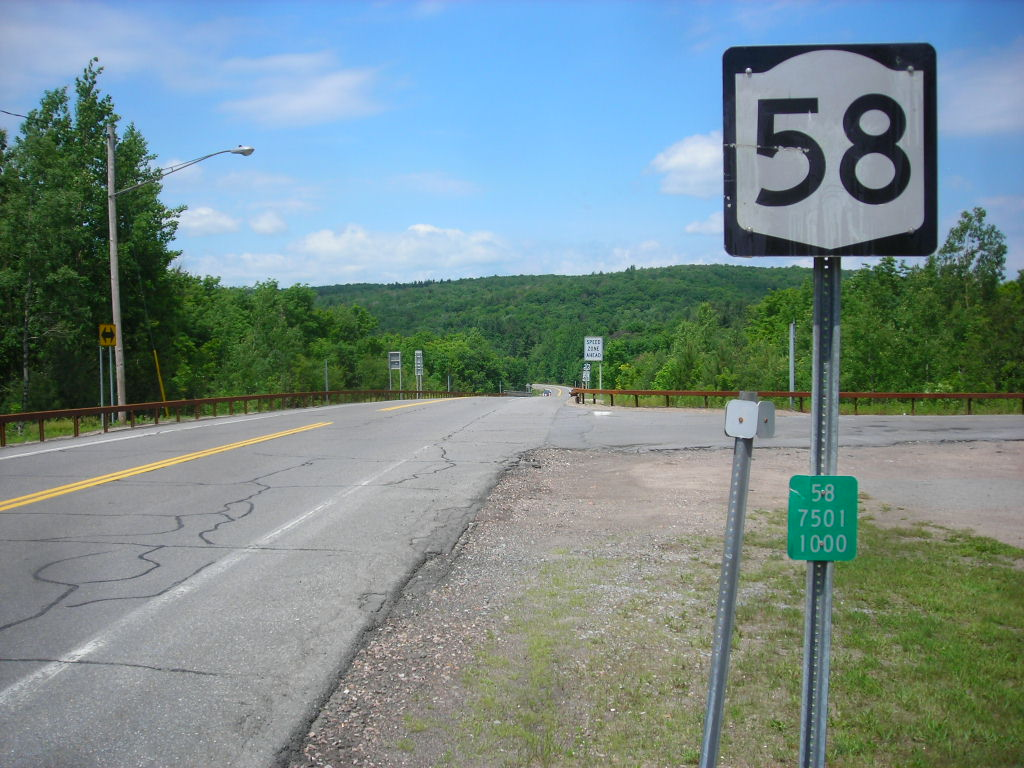
NY 58 proceeding northward from NY 3 in Fine

Through Edwards, NY 58 bends to the northeast, intersecting with former alignments of itself, becoming a two-lane dense woods road. NY 58 bends northward into fields and after an intersection with Harmon Road, bends northwest. NY 58 begins passing spacious residences as it turns westward, crossing south of the hamlet of Edwards. After crossing a creek, the route bends to the southwest, intersecting with CR 24 (Gouverneur Road). Continuing a bend to the southeast through Edwards, NY 58 turns westward and becomes a two-lane residential street for a short distance. NY 58 passes south of Talcville before turning to the southwest alongside power lines, intersecting with a branch of CR 24. NY 58 continues a southwestern wind over a creek, crossing into the town of Fowler.

NY 58 crosses a railroad alignment through Fowler, bending northwest into the hamlet of Fowler, where it intersects with NY 812. NY 58 and NY 812 become concurrent through Fowler, becoming a two-lane farm street northward, intersecting with CR 22 (Little York Road). The railroad rejoins the two roads north of the hamlet, paralleling NY 58 and NY 812 to the northwest, as the roads become a two-lane residential road. The routes enter the hamlet of Hailesboro, where the railroad crosses near an industrial complex. Crossing a former alignment of NY 58, NY 58 and NY 812 turn northward into the town of Gouverneur. The roads gain the moniker of Williams Street, proceeding northward as a two-lane residential street before crossing the river into downtown Gouverneur.

=== Gouveneur village to Morristown ===
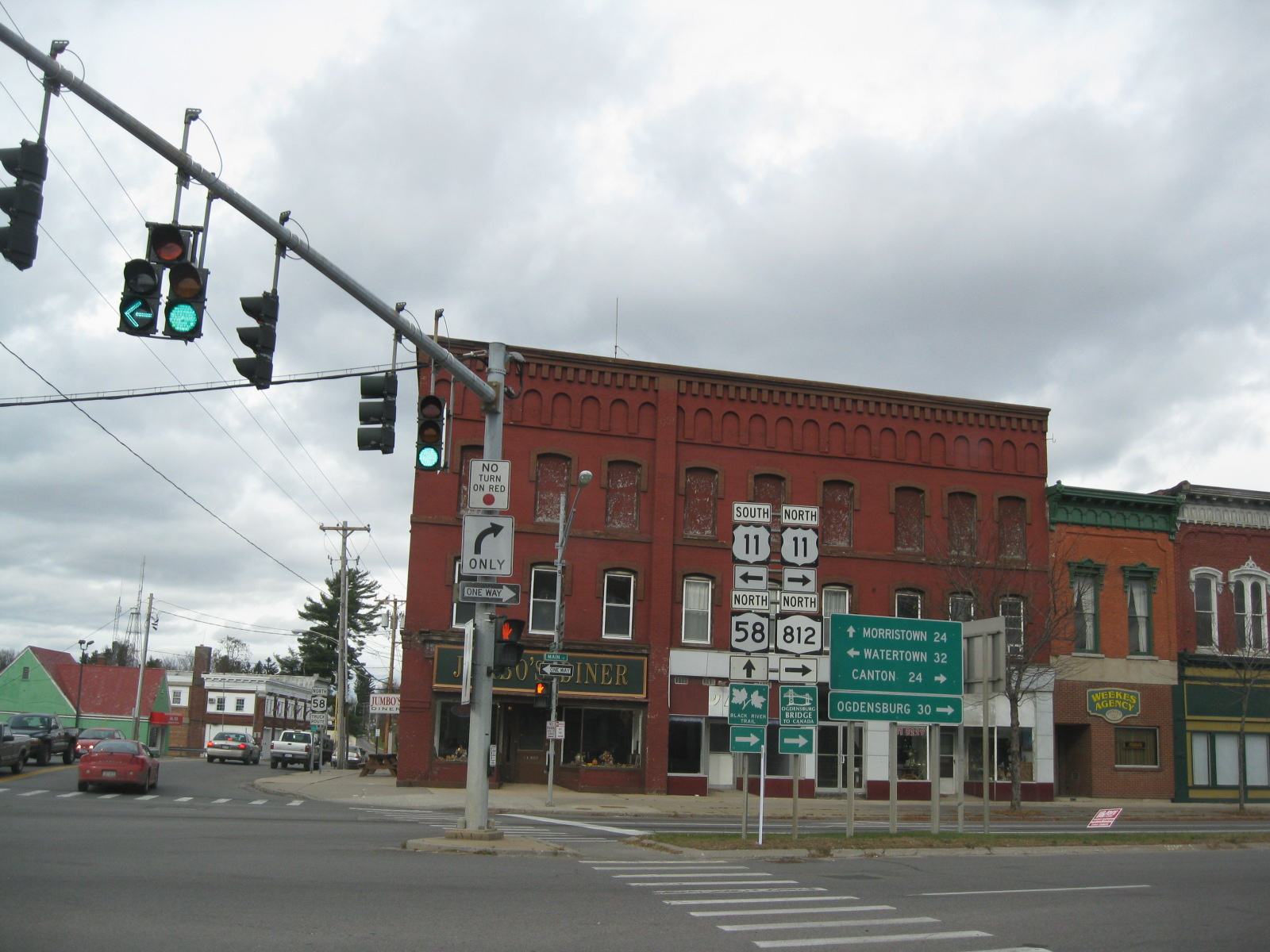
NY 58 and NY 812 at the junction with US 11 in Gouveneur

In Gouveneur, NY 812 forks east onto a concurrency with US 11 (East Main Street) while NY 58 continues northward through the village as Clinton Street. The route becomes a two-lane residential street before turning southwest along West Barney Street. NY 58 bends along the riverside, paralleling the north of CR 12 (Johnstown Street), leaving for the town of Gouverneur. NY 58 turns northward into the hamlet of Natural Dam, passing a dam before turning west once again. The route returns the rural backdrop, bending to the northwest into the hamlet of Little Bow. In Little Bow, NY 58 is a two-lane residential street, before crossing into the hamlet of Elmdale.

In Elmdale, NY 58 proceeds northward across a river, winding its way northward through the town of Gouverneur. After the intersection with Pine Hill Road, NY 58 crosses into the town of Macomb. The route becomes a two-lane residential street, bending to the northwest into the hamlet. At the rural hamlet, CR 10 intersects at-grade. Bending northwest near Pleasant Lake, NY 58 enters the hamlet of Brasie Corners. In Brasie Corners, NY 58 becomes a two-lane residential, intersecting with the northern terminus of CR 8 (Brasie Corners–Rossie Road). NY 58 leaves Brasie Corners, bending to the northeast at a junction with Hutton Road in Stark School Corner.

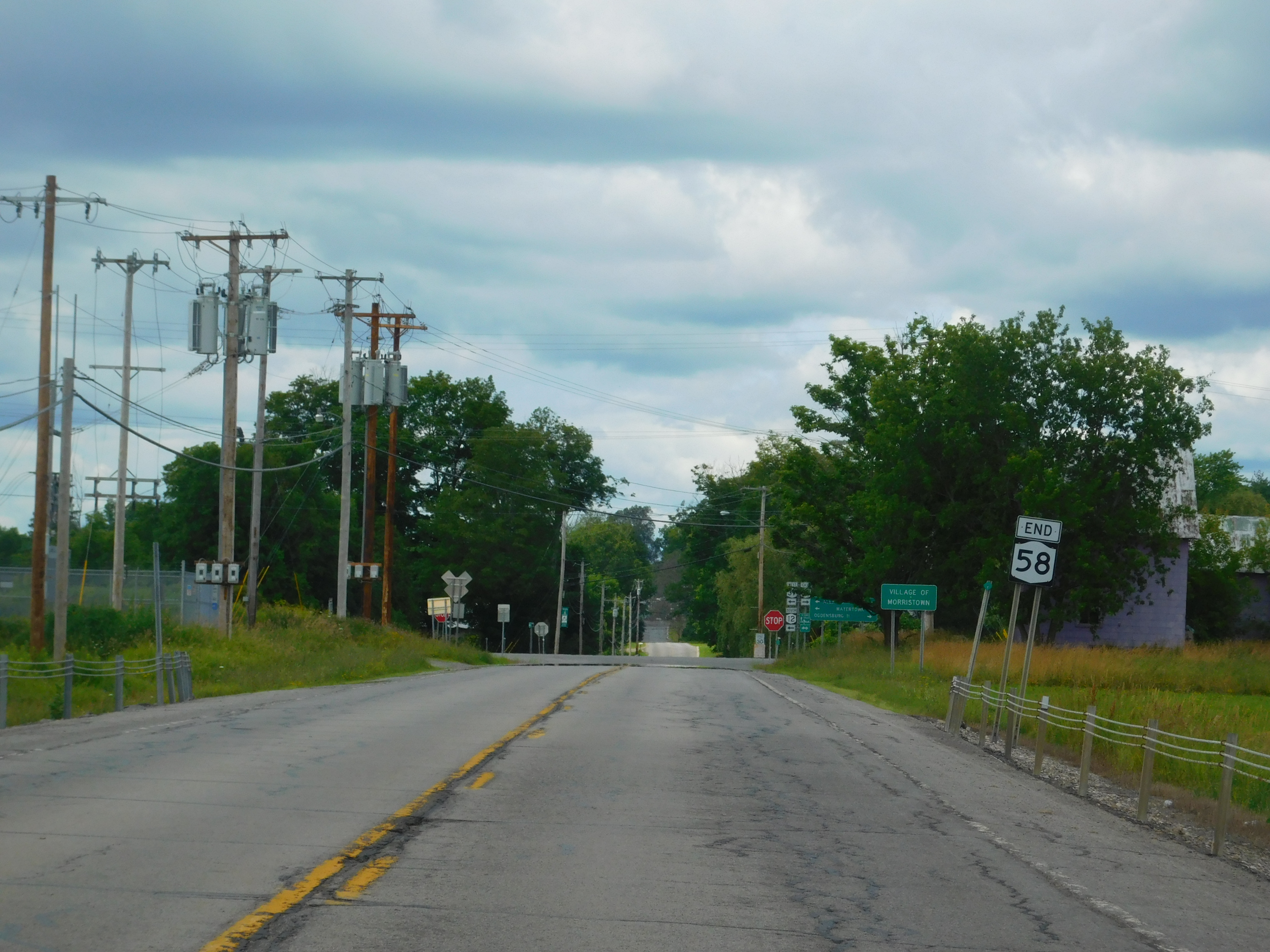
NY 58 northbound in Morristown

NY 58 continues north through Macomb, becoming a two-lane farm highway into the hamlet of Ruby Corner, where a former alignment parallels to the east once again. NY 58 bends to the northwest for less than a half-mile, becoming a lakeside highway along Black Lake. NY 58 soon turns to the northeast along the lakeside, entering the residential hamlet of Pope Mills. In Pope Mills, NY 58 intersects with the western terminus of New York State Route 184. After NY 184, NY 58 turns northward through Macomb, further away from Black Lake as a residential highway. A short distance later, the route crosses over Black Lake via a two-lane causeway, entering the hamlet of Edwardsville on the opposite shore. Upon entering Edwardsville, NY 58 is now in the town of Morristown, intersecting with CR 6 (Black Lake Road).

Continuing northwest from CR 6, NY 58 proceeds away from Black Lake as a two-lane rural roadway, crossing several local roads. NY 58 soon enters the hamlet and former village of Morristown, where it intersects with NY 37 (the Seaway Trail). This intersection serves as the northern terminus of NY 58, exactly 46 miles (74 km) north of the intersection with NY 3 in Fine. The right-of-way continues north into the hamlet as Main Street towards the St. Lawrence River.

== History ==
The entirety of NY 58 was assigned as part of the 1930 renumbering of state highways in New York. At the time, NY 58 directly served the hamlets of Edwards and Fullerville. It was realigned to bypass Fullerville to the north c. 1936 and Edwards to the southwest in the mid-1960s.

== Major intersections ==
The entire route is in St. Lawrence County.

Location	mi	km	Destinations	Notes
Fine	0.00	0.00	NY 3 – Star Lake, Cranberry Lake, Harrisville	Southern terminus
Fowler	16.29	26.22	NY 812 south – Balmat, Harrisville	Southern terminus of NY 58 / NY 812 overlap
Village of Gouverneur	22.38	36.02	US 11 / NY 812 north (East Main Street) – Watertown, Canton, Ogdensburg	Northern terminus of NY 58 / NY 812 overlap
Macomb	38.67	62.23	NY 184 east – Heuvelton	Hamlet of Pope Mills; western terminus of NY 184
Town of Morristown	46.00	74.03	NY 37 (Seaway Trail) – Alexandria Bay, Watertown, Ogdensburg	Hamlet of Morristown; northern terminus
1.000 mi = 1.609 km; 1.000 km = 0.621 mi: Concurrency terminus
