= Coles Creek State Park =

State park in St. Lawrence County, New York

- Location within New York
- Interactive map of Coles Creek State Park
- Type: State park
- Location: Route 37; Waddington, New York
- Nearest city: Waddington, New York
- Coordinates: 44°53′35″N 75°07′12″W
- Area: 1,800 acres (7.3 km^{2})
- Operator: New York State Office of Parks, Recreation and Historic Preservation
- Visitors: 175,087 (in 2014)
- Open: All year
- Camp sites: 232
- Website: Coles Creek State Park

Coles Creek State Park is a 1,800-acre (7.3 km^{2}) state park located on the Saint Lawrence River on the west bank of Coles Creek. The park is in the Town of Waddington in St. Lawrence County, New York.

== Park description ==
Coles Creek State Park offers a beach, picnic tables with pavilions, a nature trail, recreation programs, seasonal waterfowl and deer hunting, fishing and ice fishing, a marina and boat launch with dockage and boat rentals, and a food concession. The park also includes a campground with 232 tent and trailer sites, 147 of which include electric hookups.

== See also ==
- List of New York state parks
