= New York State Route 345 =

State highway in St. Lawrence County, New York, US

New York State Route 345
- Map of northern St. Lawrence County with NY 345 highlighted in red

Route information
- Maintained by NYSDOT and the village of Potsdam
- Length: 17.87 mi (28.76 km)
- Existed: 1930–present

Major junctions
- South end: US 11 in Potsdam
- North end: NY 37 in Waddington

Location
- Country: United States
- State: New York
- Counties: St. Lawrence

Highway system
- New York Highways; Interstate; US; State; Reference; Parkways
← NY 344	→ NY 346

New York State Route 345 (NY 345) is a state highway located entirely within St. Lawrence County in the North Country of New York in the United States. It is a north–south route connecting the towns of Waddington and Potsdam by way of the town of Madrid. The southern terminus of NY 345 is at an intersection with U.S. Route 11 (US 11) in the village of Potsdam. Its northern terminus is at a junction with NY 37 in the village of Waddington by the St. Lawrence River.

NY 345 was assigned as part of the 1930 renumbering of state highways in New York; however, it originally followed a different alignment south of the hamlet of Madrid. At the time, what is now NY 345 between Madrid and Potsdam was part of NY 56A. The NY 56A designation was eliminated in 1980. NY 345 was realigned two years later to follow old NY 56A to Potsdam as a result of a highway maintenance swap between the state of New York and St. Lawrence County. Ownership and maintenance of NY 345's original routing south of Madrid was transferred from the state to the county and the village of Canton as part of the exchange.

== Route description ==
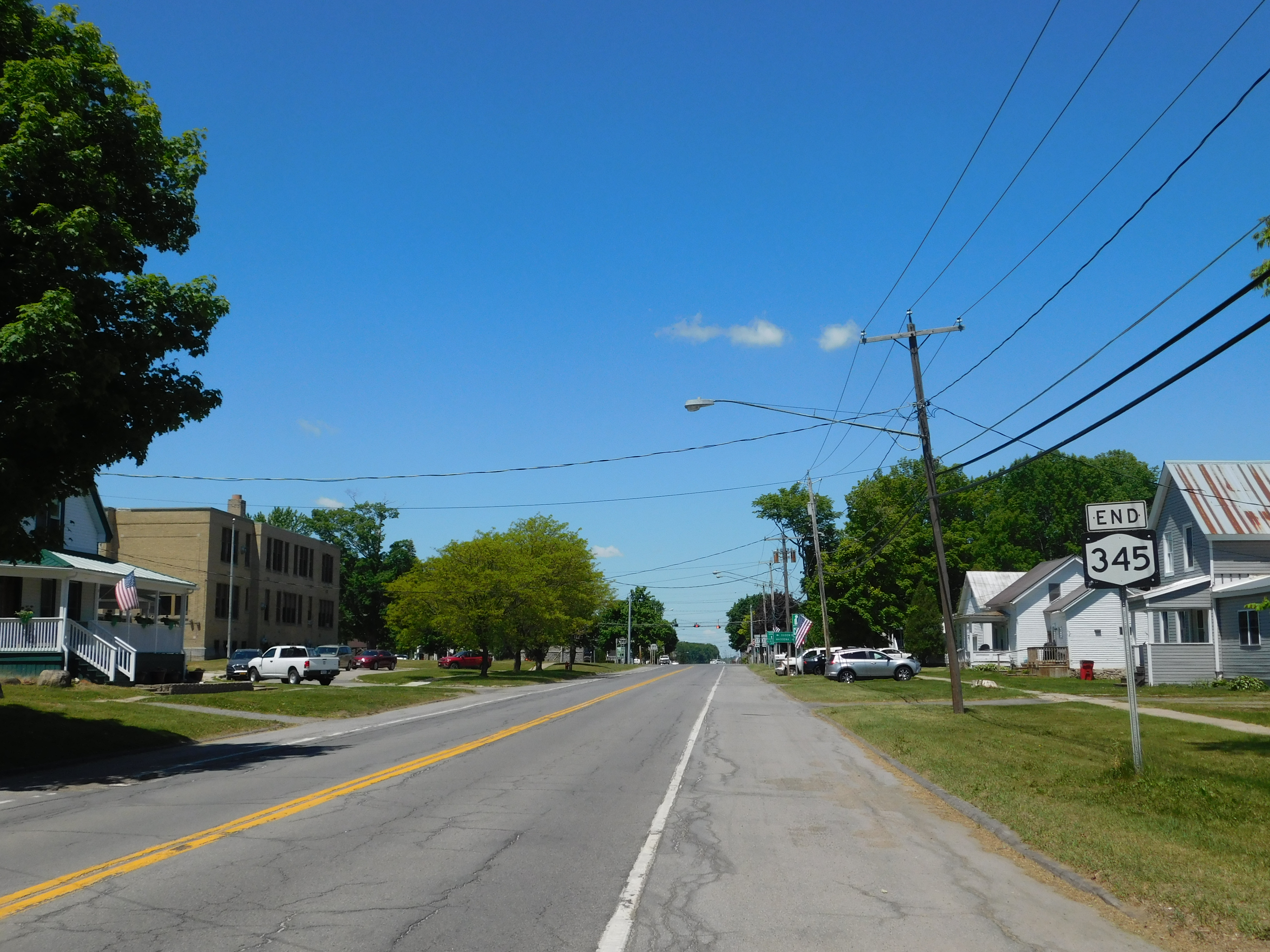
NY 345 approaching NY 37 in Waddington village

NY 345 begins at an intersection with US 11 in the village of Potsdam, just north of Clarkson University. The route heads northwestward on Pine Street and Madrid Avenue as a village-maintained, state-numbered highway, crossing the CSX Transportation-owned St. Lawrence Subdivision by way of a grade crossing as it heads through a commercial and residential area. It exits the village shortly afterward, at which point the route becomes maintained by the New York State Department of Transportation. It heads northwestward on a linear path through the town of Potsdam, passing through mostly undeveloped areas comprising open fields and forests. NY 345 curves slightly northward at Burnham Corners before crossing Trout Brook and entering the town of Madrid, where it traverses the New York and Ogdensburg Railway by way of a grade crossing just outside the hamlet of Madrid.

The highway continues into the community, where the route becomes Bridge Street and intersects NY 310 on the eastern bank of the Grasse River. It continues across the river to Main Street, at which point NY 345 turns to the northeast and follows Main Street out of the hamlet. North of Madrid, NY 345 curves back to the northwest as it enters another rural area. It passes by the isolated Madrid–Waddington Central School just before crossing into the town of Waddington. The rural surroundings continue to the village of Waddington, where the amount of development along the route increases after the highway crosses Sucker Brook south of the village center. NY 345 ends shortly afterward at an intersection with NY 37 in the village center near the southern bank of the St. Lawrence River.

== History ==
When NY 345 was assigned as part of the 1930 renumbering of state highways in New York, it began at US 11 in Canton. From there, NY 345 followed modern County Route 27 (CR 27) and CR 14 north to Madrid, where it joined its modern alignment north to Waddington. At the same time, the current alignment of NY 345 from modern NY 310 in Madrid to Potsdam was designated as the southern half of NY 56A. The short piece of Bridge Street not part of NY 56A in Madrid was a state-maintained reference route.

On April 10, 1980, the NY 56A designation was deleted. The portion of former NY 56A from Madrid to Potsdam, as well as the state-maintained Bridge Street connector, became part of a rerouted NY 345 on September 1, 1982, as a result of a highway maintenance swap between the state of New York and St. Lawrence County. As part of the swap, the pre-1982 routing of NY 345 between the Canton village line and Bridge Street in Madrid was turned over to the county while the portion of former NY 345 within Canton was transferred to the village.

== Major intersections ==
The entire route is in St. Lawrence County.

Location	mi	km	Destinations	Notes
Village of Potsdam	0.00	0.00	US 11 – Malone	Southern terminus
Madrid	8.54	13.74	NY 310	
Madrid	8.89	14.31	CR 14	Former routing of NY 345
Village of Waddington	17.87	28.76	NY 37 (Lincoln Avenue)	Northern terminus
1.000 mi = 1.609 km; 1.000 km = 0.621 mi
