= Clarkson Office Building =

Historic commercial building in New York, United States

- U.S. National Register of Historic Places
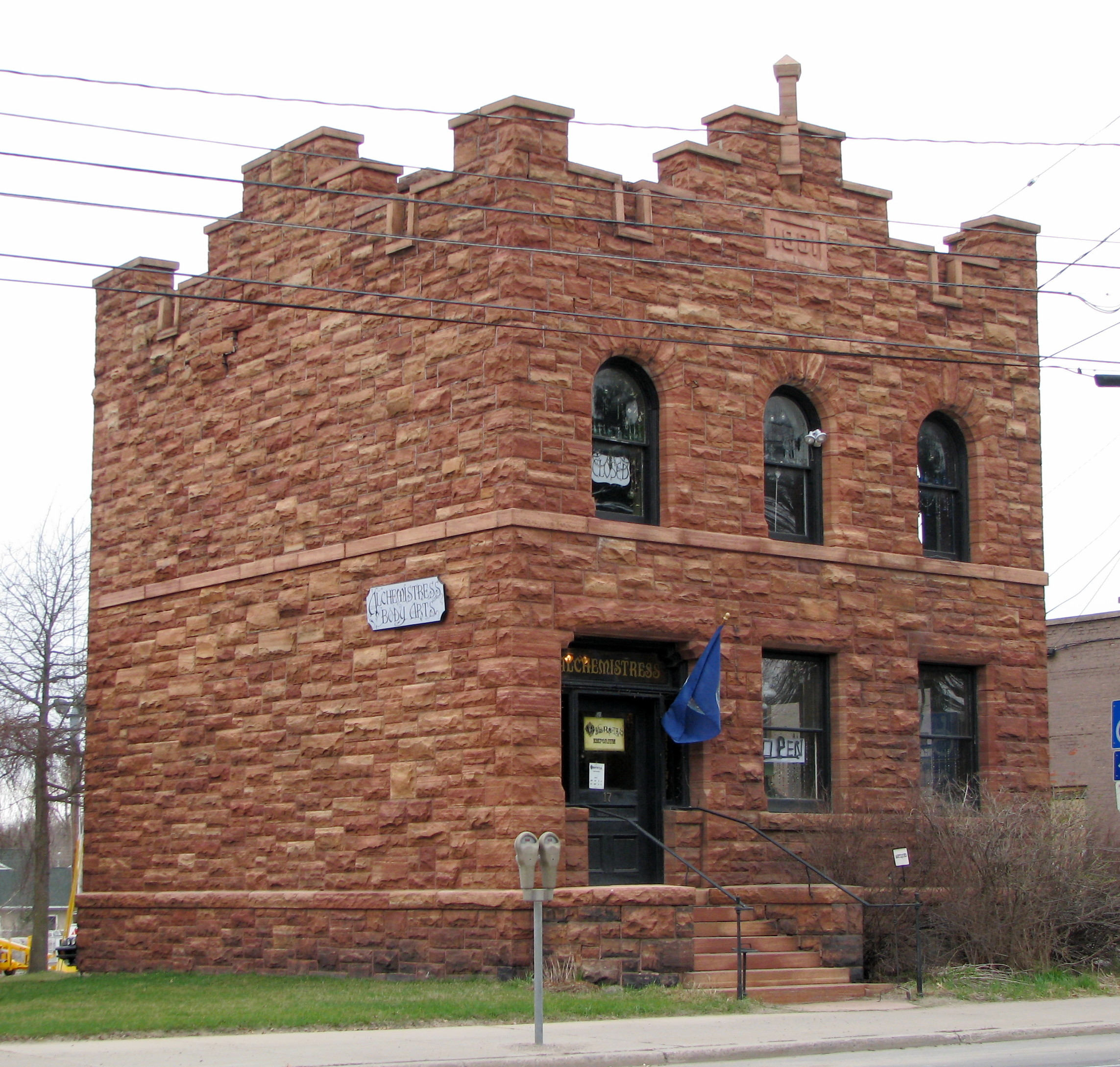
- Clarkson Office Building

- Location within New York Location within the United States
- Location: 17 Maple St. Potsdam, New York, U.S.
- Coordinates: 44°40′4″N 74°59′20″W
- Area: less than one acre
- Built: 1901
- Architectural style: Romanesque
- MPS: Red Potsdam Sandstone Resources Taken from Raquette River Quarries MPS
- NRHP reference No.: 03000031
- Added to NRHP: March 5, 2004

Clarkson Office Building is a historic office building located at Potsdam in St. Lawrence County, New York. It was built in 1901 and is a two-story, three by three bay, square shaped stone structure in the Romanesque style. It is constructed of red Potsdam Sandstone and features a castellated roofline.

It was listed on the National Register of Historic Places in 2003.
