= Waddington Historic District =

Historic district in New York, United States

- U.S. National Register of Historic Places
- U.S. Historic district
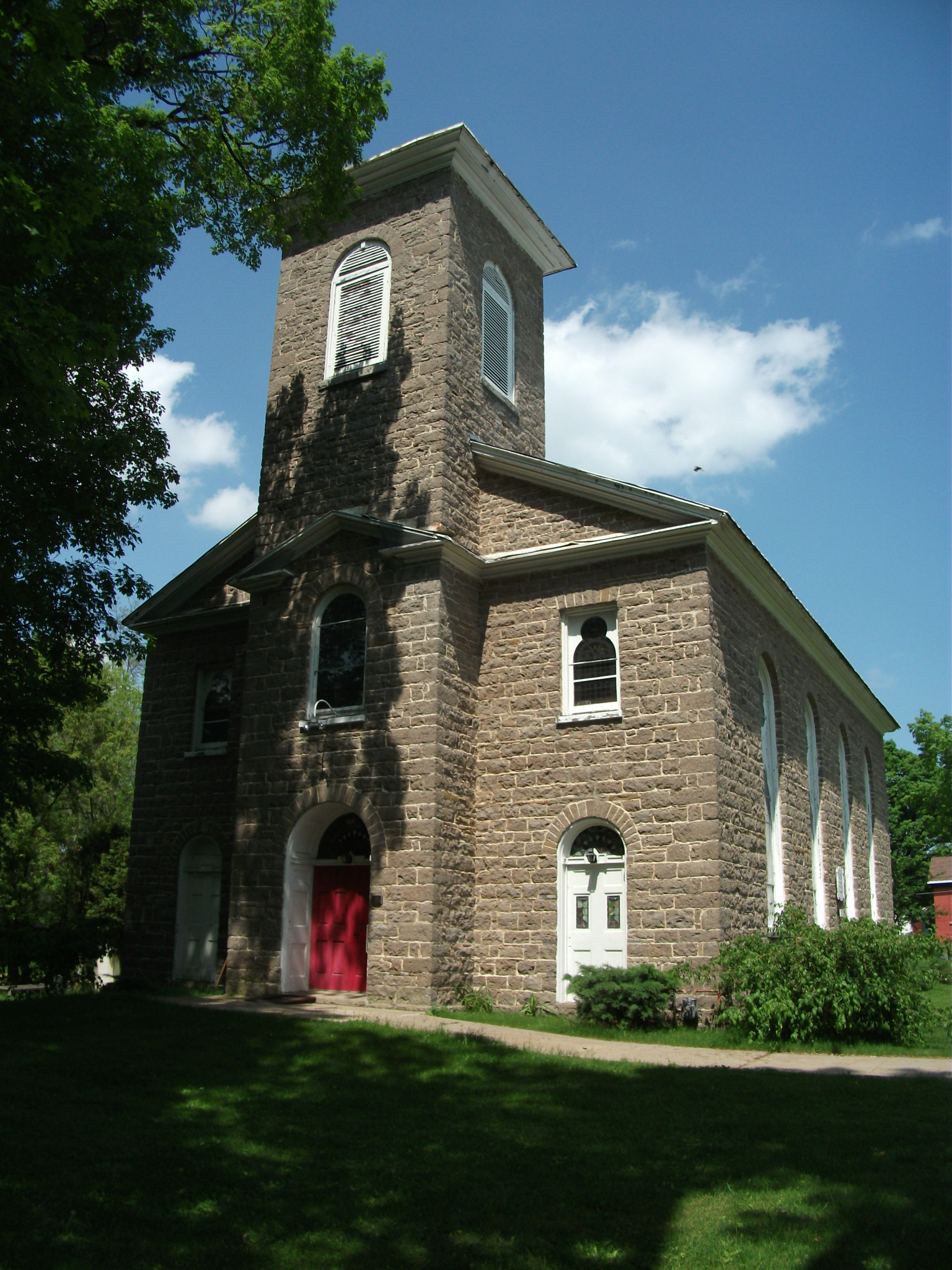
- St. Paul's Episcopal Church, May 2011

- Location within New York Location within the United States
- Location: Jct. of NY 37 and La Grasse St., Waddington, New York
- Coordinates: 44°51′49″N 75°12′13″W
- Area: 6 acres (2.4 ha)
- Architect: Johnson, Isaac; Ramee, Joseph-Jacques
- Architectural style: Greek Revival, Late Victorian, Federal
- NRHP reference No.: 92000457
- Added to NRHP: May 18, 1992

Waddington Historic District is a national historic district located at Waddington in St. Lawrence County, New York. The district includes 11 contributing buildings. Among them are the St. Paul's Episcopal Church (1816), Town Hall (1884), Hepburn Library (1919), and homes dating back to the 1820s.

It was listed on the National Register of Historic Places in 1992.

== Gallery ==
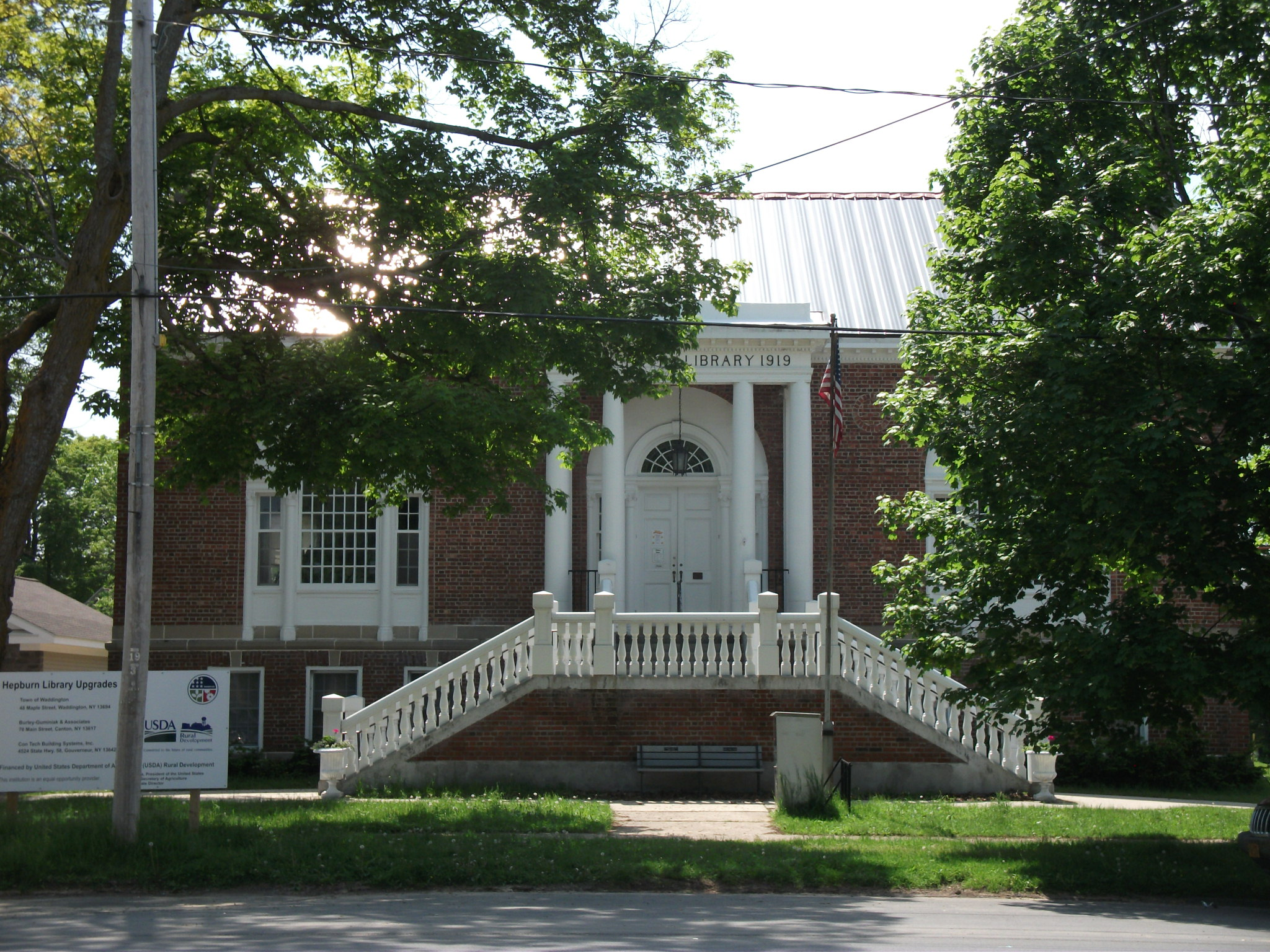
Hepburn Library, May 2011

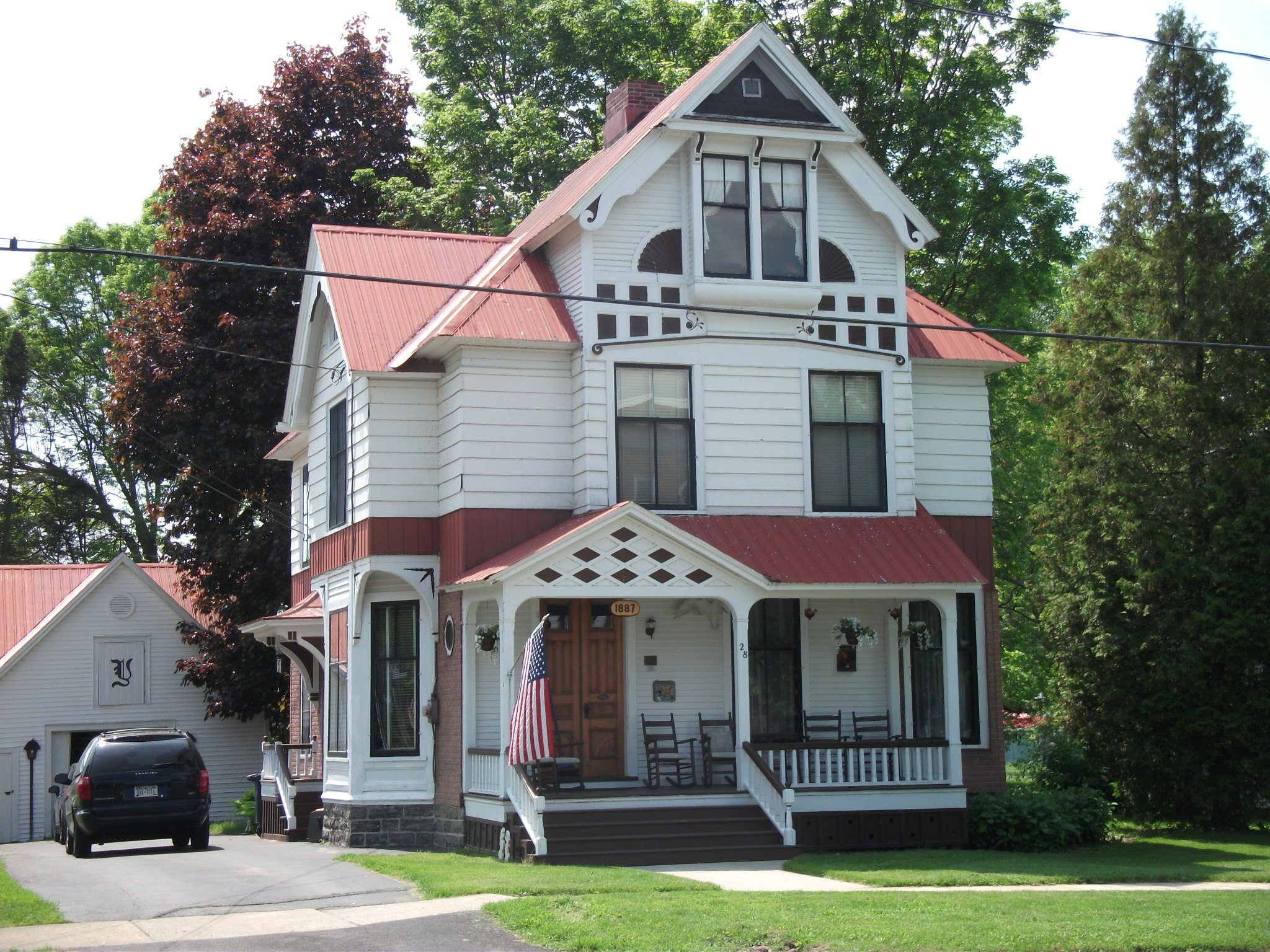
House on LaGrasse St., May 2011
