= Bayside Cemetery and Gatehouse Complex =

Historic cemetery in New York, United States

- U.S. National Register of Historic Places
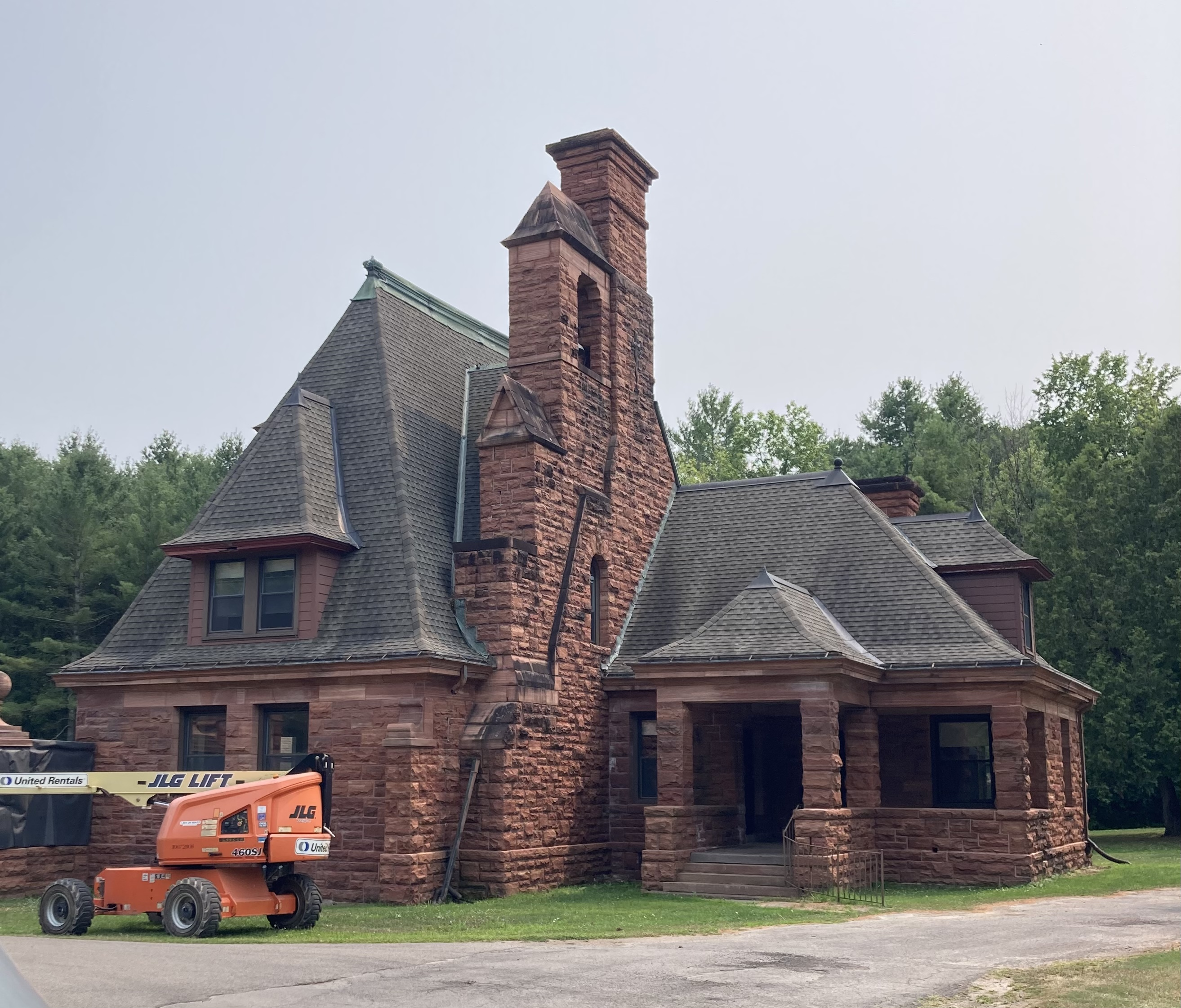
- The Bayside Cemetery Gatehouse photographed in 2025.

- Location within New York Location within the United States
- Location: 115 Clarkson Ave. Potsdam, New York, U.S.
- Coordinates: 44°39′17″N 74°59′29″W
- Area: 83.6 acres (33.8 ha)
- Built: 1865, 1901
- Architect: multiple
- Architectural style: Late Victorian
- MPS: Red Potsdam Sandstone Resources Taken from Raquette River Quarries MPS
- NRHP reference No.: 03000026
- Added to NRHP: March 26, 2004

Bayside Cemetery and Gatehouse Complex is a historic cemetery and gatehouse located at Potsdam in St. Lawrence County, New York. The cemetery was established in 1865 and the gatehouse complex constructed in 1901. The gatehouse complex is a Châteauesque style, Late Victorian red Potsdam ashlar sandstone building. It includes a receiving room for the deceased and mourners, quarters for the cemetery custodial family, and a bell tower. The cemetery includes a number of notable structures and objects including the Clarkson mausoleum (1873), Morgan family obelisk, and Soldiers Monument (1903).

It was listed on the National Register of Historic Places in 2004.
