= Chase Mills Inn =

- U.S. National Register of Historic Places
- Location within New York Location within the United States
- Location: Mein and Townline Rds. Chase Mills, New York, U.S.
- Coordinates: 44°50′56″N 75°4′52″W
- Area: 1 acre (0.40 ha)
- Built: 1865
- NRHP reference No.: 78003122
- Added to NRHP: November 29, 1978

Chase Mills Inn was a historic inn and tavern building located at Chase Mills in St. Lawrence County, New York. It was built about 1865 and is a two-story wood-sheathed structure with a principal three-bay mass and a two-story, two-bay wing. It features a low hipped roof and two porches.

It was listed on the National Register of Historic Places in 1978.

The Inn was torn down in 2005 and owned by George Michels who owned it since 1972. It was originally owned by Moses Small, Edward Creighton, Levi Abernathy, and Mary Lenny. Lenny sold it to Michels.
