= Madrid–Waddington Central School =

Madrid-Waddington Central School
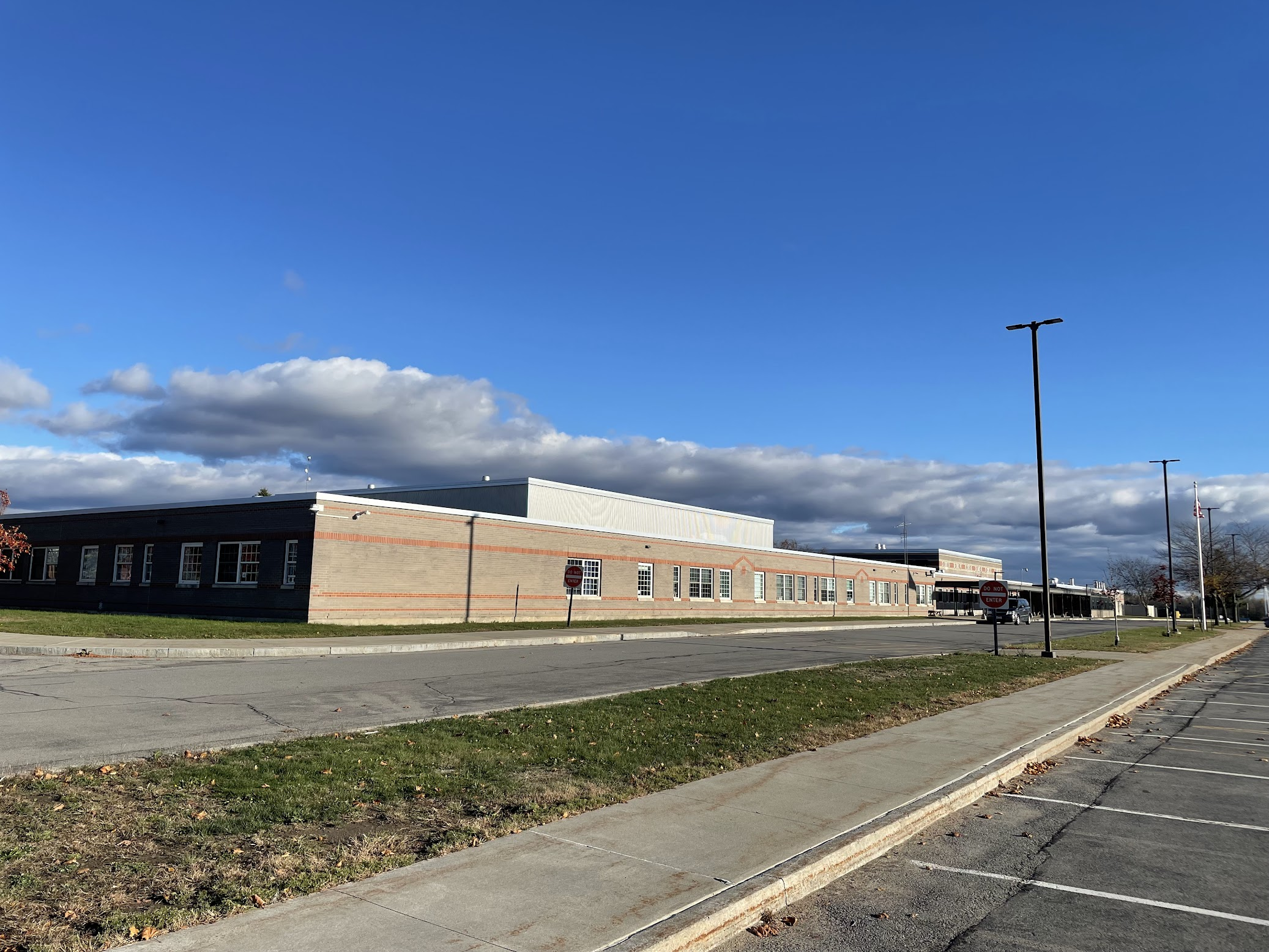

Location
- 2582 State Highway 345; Post Office Box 67; Madrid, New York 13660; United States
- 44.7886°N 75.1535°W

Information
- School type: Public
- Established: 1991 (Waddington and Madrid Schools combine)
- School district: Madrid-Waddington Central
- Principal: Joe Binion (High School) & Nicole Weakfall (Elementary School)
- Grades: PreK-12
- Enrollment: About 645 (2015-2016)
- Student to teacher ratio: 15:1
- Campus size: about 4 acres
- Colours: Blue and Gold
- Mascot: a Yellow Jacket
- Nickname: The Yellow Jackets
- Team name: The Yellow Jackets
- Newspaper: MWCS The Hive
- Website: mwcsk12.org

Madrid–Waddington Central School, often shortened to MWCS, is a public school offering Pre-Kindergarten through Grade 12 education located in Madrid, New York. It is a small, rural district located in St. Lawrence County on State Highway 345 between the communities of Madrid and Waddington, New York. MWCS has an enrollment of approximately 650 students last estimated circa 2016.

Eric Burke is the current Superintendent of Schools. The Board of Education consists of nine members who are elected by the residents of the district. These members are Wyatt Boswell, Bruce Durant, Charles Grant, Wyatt Hayes, Katie Logan, Christopher Pryce (Vice President), Mike Ruddy, Robert Smith (President), and Amber Sullivan.

MWCS is a PK (pre-kindergarten)- 12th grade school. It is divided into two sections, the elementary being split by a fourth lobby in the center of it. The HS lobby is next to the HS cafeteria (looks a bit like a greenhouse) and the elementary has a huge skylight. The third lobby is next to the auditorium.

Pre-K, JK, and Kindergarten constitute the pre-school. 1st-5th grades are the elementary school. 6th-8th grades are middle school, and 9th-12th is high school. Of note, the High School has been well established since 1959; however, the elementary Schools of Madrid and Waddington only merged in 1991. There are several events a year, including numerous dances and assemblies. The district includes parts of Canton, Chase Mills, Madrid, parts of Lisbon and Potsdam, and Waddington.
