= Madrid (CDP), New York =

Madrid, New York
- Census-designated place
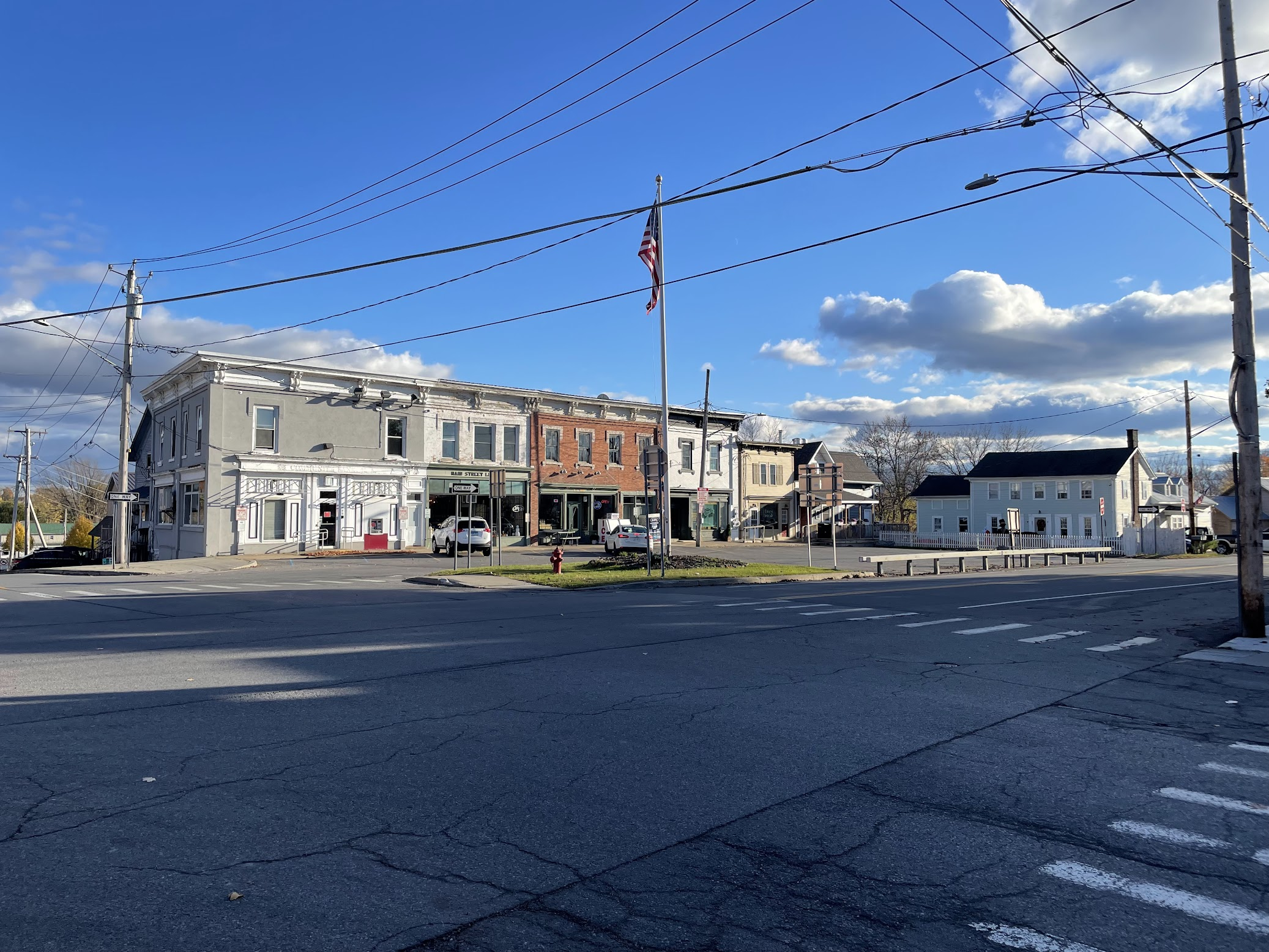
- Madrid center at the intersection of State Route 345 and County Route 14.

- Location within New York Location within the United States
- Coordinates: 44°44′56″N 75°7′54″W
- Country: United States
- State: New York
- County: St. Lawrence
- Town: Madrid

Area
  - Total: 3.86 sq mi (10.00 km^{2})
  - Land: 3.73 sq mi (9.65 km^{2})
  - Water: 0.14 sq mi (0.35 km^{2})
- Elevation: 320 ft (98 m)

Population (2020)
  - Total: 736
  - Density: 197.5/sq mi (76.24/km^{2})
- Time zone: UTC-5 (Eastern (EST))
  - Summer (DST): UTC-4 (EDT)
- ZIP Code: 13660
- Area codes: 315/680
- FIPS code: 36-44479
- GNIS feature ID: 2627948

Madrid is the primary hamlet and a census-designated place (CDP) in the town of Madrid in St. Lawrence County, New York, United States. At the 2020 census, it had a population of 736, out of 1,735 in the entire town of Madrid.

The community is in northern St. Lawrence County, south of the center of the town of Madrid. New York State Route 310 runs through Madrid, leading northeast 20 miles (32 km) to Massena and southwest 11 miles (18 km) to Canton. State Route 345 crosses NY 310 south of the center of the hamlet. It leads north-northwest 9 miles (14 km) to Waddington on the St. Lawrence River and southeast 10 miles (16 km) to Potsdam.

The Grass River, a tributary of the St. Lawrence River, flows northeastward through the center of Madrid.

== Demographics ==
Historical population
Census	Pop.	Note	%±
2020	736		—
U.S. Decennial Census

== Education ==
The school district is Madrid-Waddington Central School District.
