= Clarkson-Knowles Cottage =

Historic house in New York, United States

- U.S. National Register of Historic Places
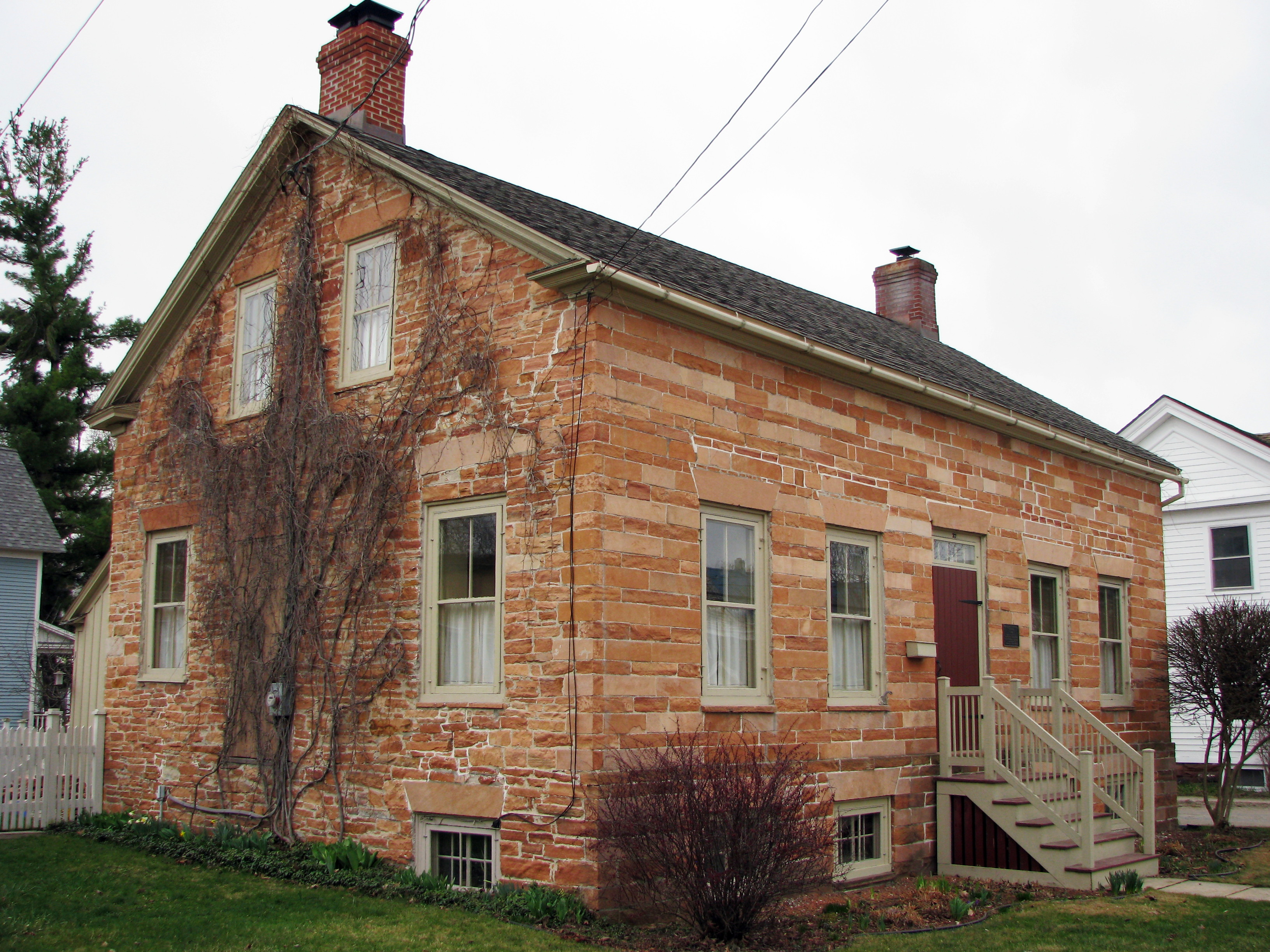
- Clarkson-Knowles Cottage

- Location within New York Location within the United States
- Location: 37 Main St. Potsdam, New York, U.S.
- Coordinates: 44°40′6″N 74°59′0″W
- Area: less than one acre
- Built: 1835
- Architectural style: Federal
- NRHP reference No.: 95001405
- Added to NRHP: December 7, 1995

Clarkson-Knowles Cottage is a historic home located at Potsdam in St. Lawrence County, New York. It was built about 1835 and is a 1 1/2-story, five-bay residence constructed of red Potsdam Sandstone in the slab and binder style.

It was listed on the National Register of Historic Places in 1995.
