= United Church of Madrid =

Historic church in New York, United States

- First Congregational Church of Madrid
- U.S. National Register of Historic Places
- Location within New York Location within the United States
- Location: 6 Cross St.; 32 Main St., Madrid, New York
- Coordinates: 44°45′2″N 75°7′53″W
- NRHP reference No.: 10000914
- Added to NRHP: November 10, 2010

United Church Of Madrid, formerly the First Congregational Church of Madrid, is a historic church in Madrid, St. Lawrence County, New York. The building dates from 1807.

First Congregational Church and the Madrid Methodist Church decided to merge in 1974. The combined congregation is affiliated with both the United Church of Christ and the United Methodist Church. It worships in the former Congregational Church building. The Methodist congregation in Madrid formed in 1837 from the Canton Methodist circuit. It was originally based in Buck's Bridge, but relocated to Madrid by 1847 because many of the congregants lived in Madrid.

The First Congregational Church and Parsonage were listed on the New York State Register of Historic Places and National Register of Historic Places in 2010. The church's Sunday School wing features a 17-foot (5.2 m) tall stained glass window that was created in 1918 by Harry J. Horwood, a stained-glass artist based in Ogdensburg, New York, and originally was installed in the Madrid Methodist Church. When the churches merged, the window was moved to the Congregational Church and installed in the newly built Sunday School wing. A restoration of the window was completed in 2012.
