= Potsdam (village), New York =

Potsdam
- Village
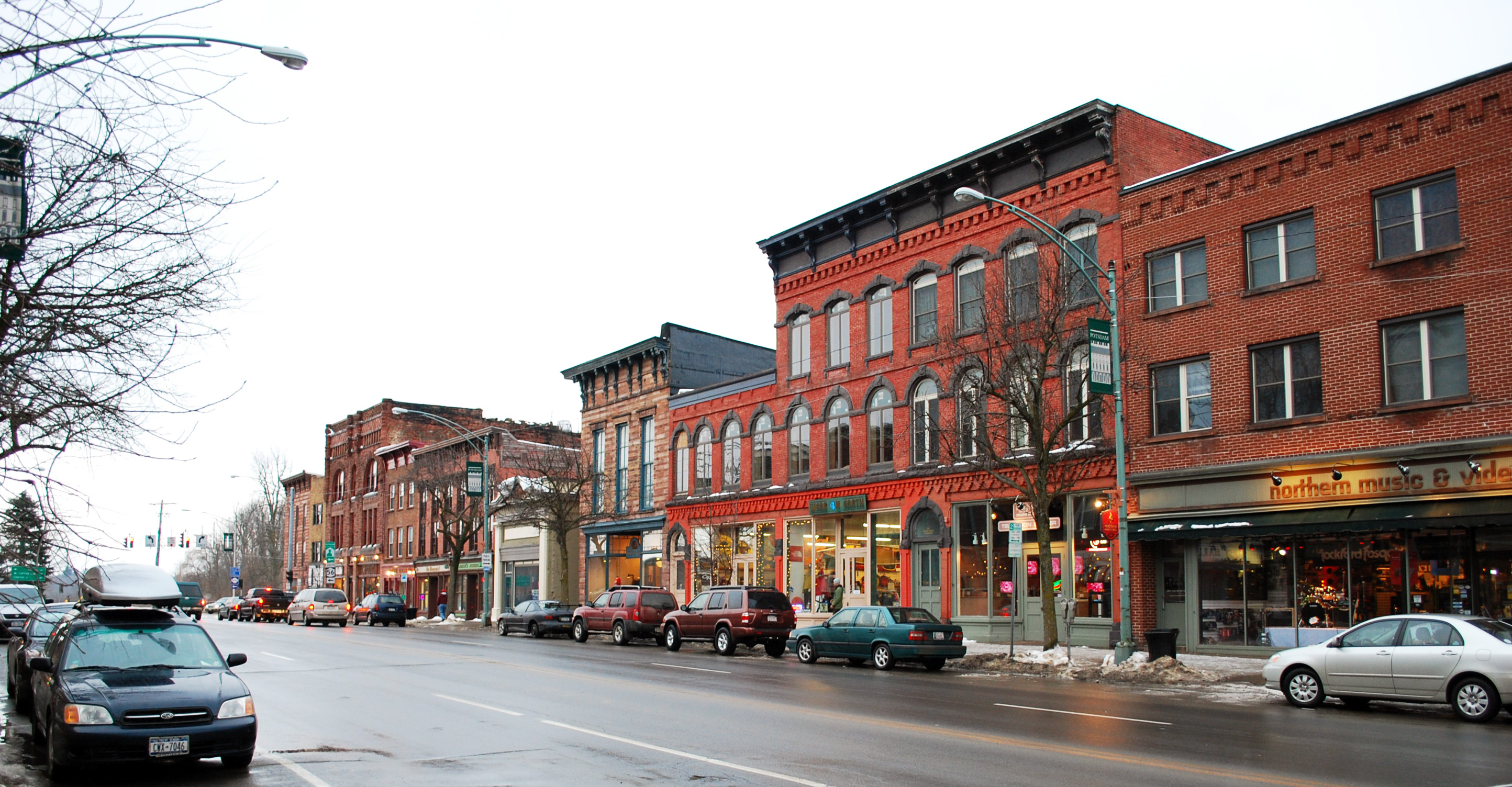
- Market Street in Potsdam
- Motto: Si vis pacem para bellum
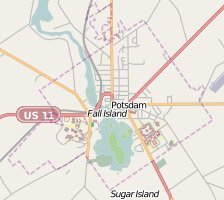
- Potsdam, New York from OpenStreetMap

- Location within the state of New York
- Coordinates: 44°40′12″N 74°58′59″W
- Country: United States
- State: New York
- County: St. Lawrence
- Named after: sandstone found resembling the sandstone in Potsdam, Germany

Area
  - Total: 5.41 sq mi (14.02 km^{2})
  - Land: 4.92 sq mi (12.74 km^{2})
  - Water: 0.49 sq mi (1.28 km^{2})
- Elevation: 423 ft (129 m)

Population (2020)
  - Total: 8,312
  - Density: 1,690.3/sq mi (652.61/km^{2})
- Time zone: UTC-5 (Eastern (EST))
  - Summer (DST): UTC-4 (EDT)
- ZIP code: 13676
- Area code: 315
- FIPS code: 36-59564
- GNIS feature ID: 2391082
- Website: https://villageofpotsdamny.gov/

Potsdam is a village located in the Town of Potsdam in St. Lawrence County, New York, United States. The population was 8,312 at the 2020 census. The Village of Potsdam is in the eastern part of the town and is northeast of Canton, the county seat. The village is the locale of the State University of New York at Potsdam and Clarkson University.

== History ==
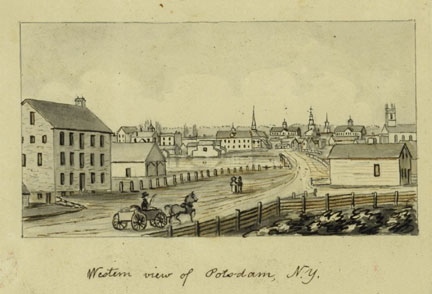
Western View of Potsdam, New York (circa 1856–1860) by John Warner Barber

The village was formerly a community of the St. Regis Indians. The early European settlers arrived at that location around 1803.

The village was incorporated in 1831. In 1841, the village charter was amended to increase the size of the village.

Potsdam was the seventh town erected by an Act of the Legislature passed February 21, 1806, formerly attached to Madrid. It was one of the original ten townships, No. 3, and is said to have been named thus by the commissioners on the discovery by the surveyors of a bed of reddish sandstone resembling the sandstone in Potsdam, Germany.

The Market Street Historic District, Bayside Cemetery and Gatehouse Complex, Clarkson Office Building, Clarkson-Knowles Cottage, Nathaniel Parmeter House, Trinity Episcopal Church, and United States Post Office are listed on the National Register of Historic Places.

=== Notable people ===
- Job Bicknell Ellis, a mycologist, was born in Potsdam and briefly taught there
- Frank B. Kellogg, co-author of the Kellogg–Briand Pact, was born in Potsdam
- Marguerite LeHand, secretary to President Franklin D. Roosevelt, was born in Potsdam
- Clarence F. Stephens, a mathematician, taught in Potsdam and developed model teaching methods for college mathematics

== Geography ==
Potsdam is located at 44°40′12″N 74°58′59″W (44.669961, -74.9829436).

According to the United States Census Bureau, the village has a total area of 4.8 square miles (12.6 km^{2}), of which 4.4 square miles (11.4 km^{2}) is land and 0.5 square mile (1.2 km^{2}) (9.48%) is water.

The village is on the banks of the Raquette River.

U.S. Route 11 passes through the village from east to west, and New York State Route 56 passes through from north to south. New York State Route 11B enters from the east, and New York State Route 345 enters from the northwest.

== Demographics ==
Historical population
Census	Pop.	Note	%±
1850	1,471		—
1860	1,699		15.5%
1870	2,891		70.2%
1880	2,762		−4.5%
1890	3,961		43.4%
1900	3,843		−3.0%
1910	4,036		5.0%
1920	4,039		0.1%
1930	4,136		2.4%
1940	4,821		16.6%
1950	7,491		55.4%
1960	7,765		3.7%
1970	10,303		32.7%
1980	10,635		3.2%
1990	10,251		−3.6%
2000	9,425		−8.1%
2010	9,428		0.0%
2020	8,312		−11.8%
U.S. Decennial Census

As of the census of 2010, there were 9,428 people, 2,265 households, and 1,040 families residing in the village. The population density was 2,148.2 inhabitants per square mile (829.4/km^{2}). There were 2,705 housing units at an average density of 616.5 per square mile (238.0/km^{2}). The racial makeup of the village was 91.60% White, 2.50% Black or African American, 0.36% Native American, 3.88% Asian, 0.01% Pacific Islander, 0.53% from other races, and 1.11% from two or more races. Hispanic or Latino of any race were 1.75% of the population.

There were 2,543 households, out of which 21.5% had children under the age of 18 living with them, 28.5% were married couples living together, 10.3% had a female householder with no husband present, and 59.1% were non-families. 40.8% of all households were made up of individuals, and 15.6% had someone living alone who was 65 years of age or older. The average household size was 2.14 and the average family size was 2.90.

In the village, the population was spread out, with 11.3% under the age of 18, 56.2% from 18 to 24, 14.1% from 25 to 44, 9.4% from 45 to 64, and 9.1% who were 65 years of age or older.

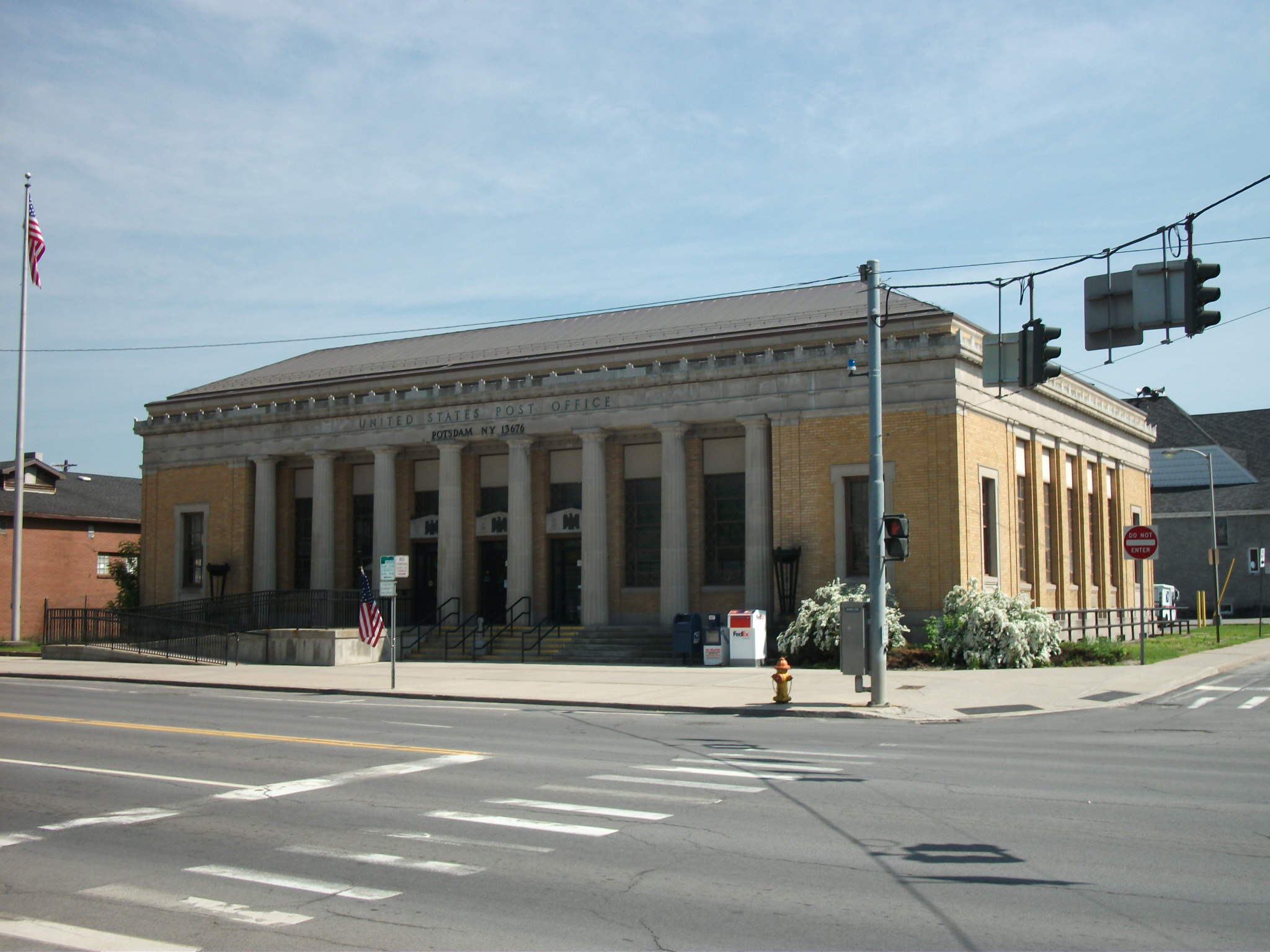
Potsdam Post Office

The median age was 22 years. For every 100 females, there were 110.1 males. For every 100 females age 18 and over, there were 109.8 males.

The median income for a household in the village was $21,273, and the median income for a family was $37,933. Males had a median income of $31,610 versus $24,324 for females. The per capita income for the village was $10,824. About 18.2% of families and 34.0% of the population were below the poverty line, including 20.8% of those under age 18 and 13.8% of those age 65 or over.

== Gallery ==
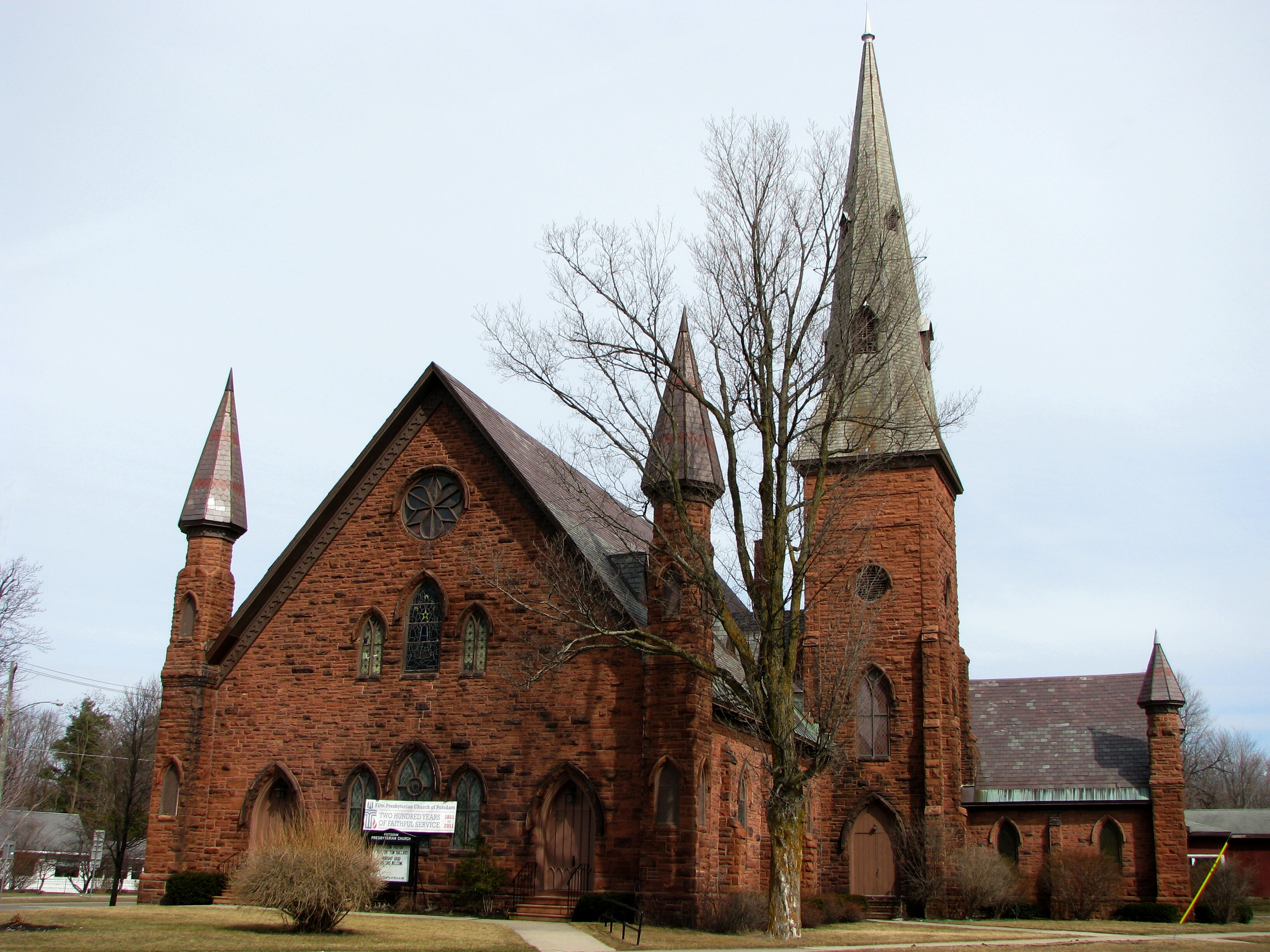
First Presbyterian Church of Potsdam

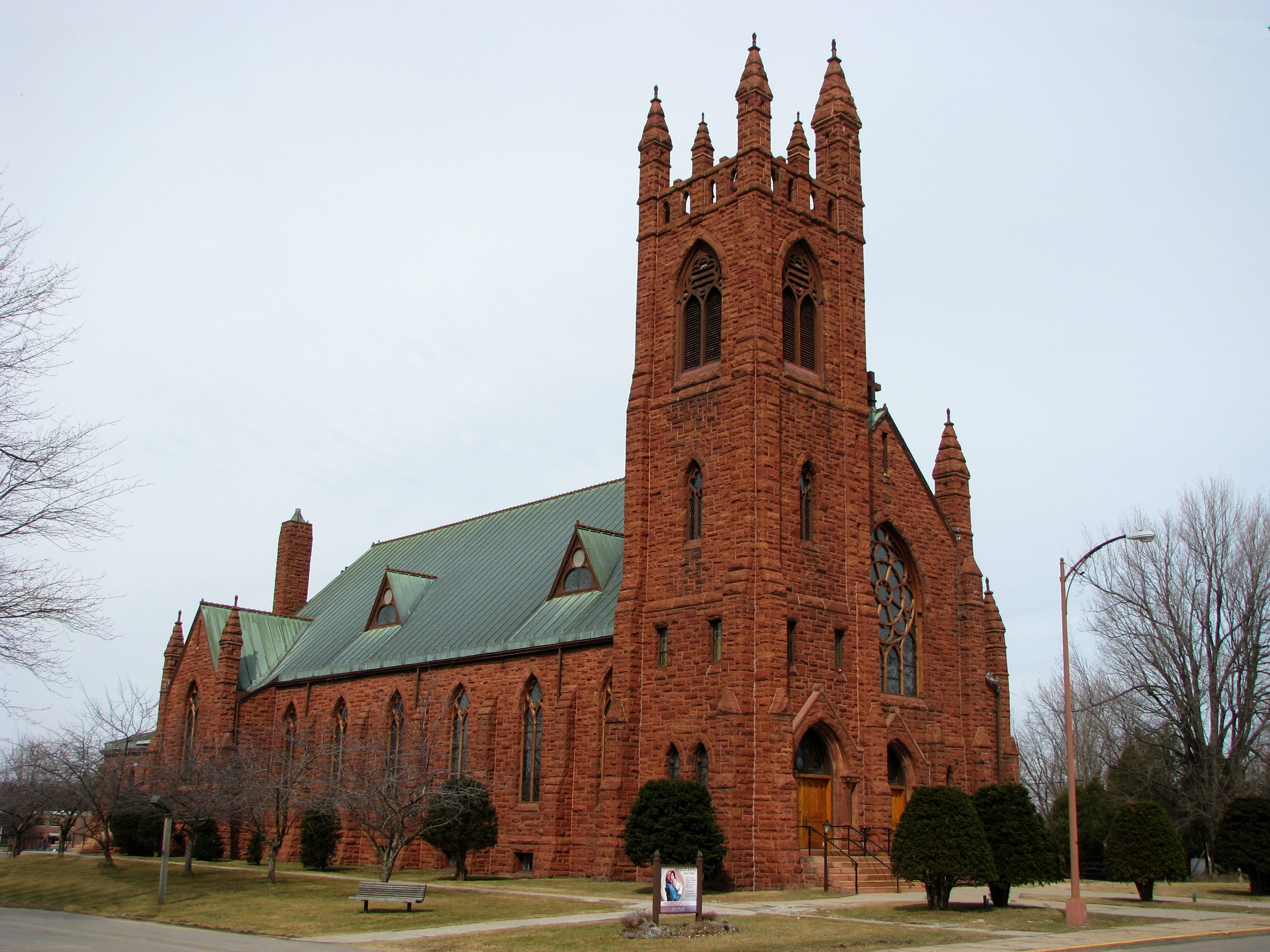
St. Mary's Catholic Church

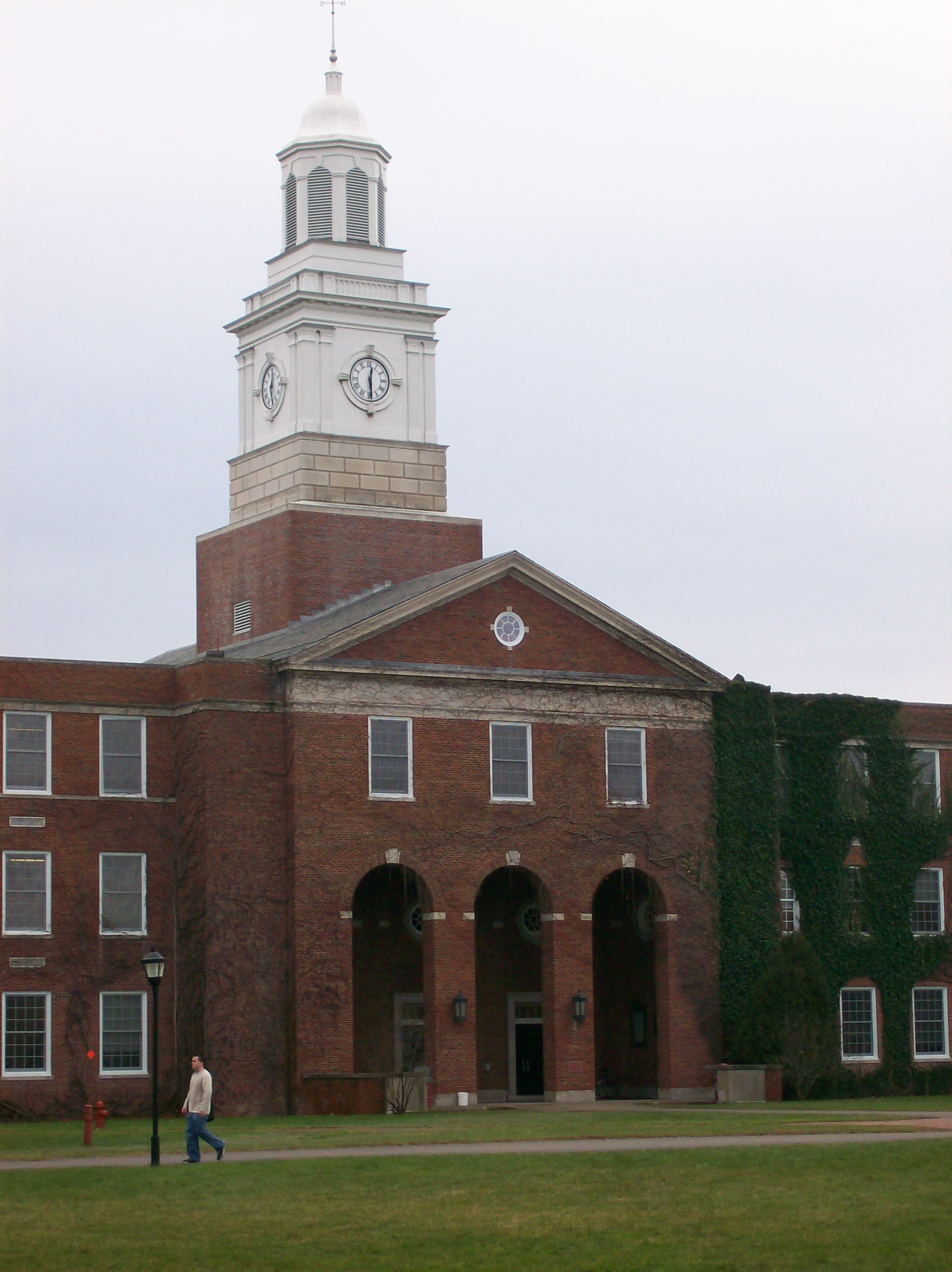
SUNY Potsdam's Satterlee Hall

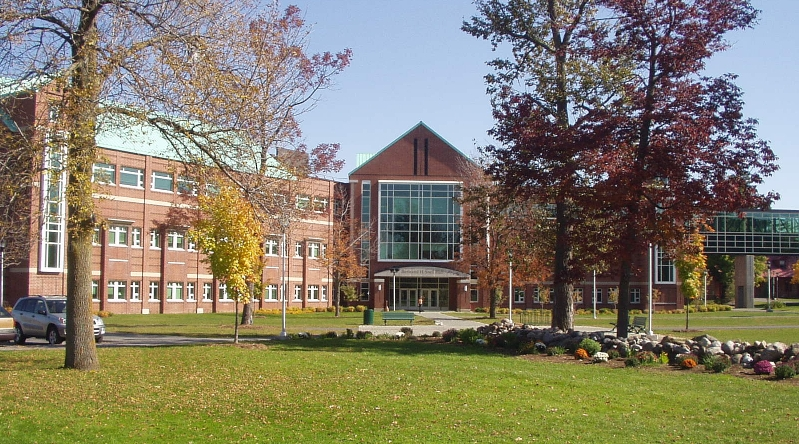
Clarkson U., Bertrand H. Snell Hall

== Education ==
The village is in the Potsdam Central School District. Potsdam High School is located in the village.

== Radio ==
- 1340 WMSA
- WTSC-FM 91.1 The Source
- WVLF-FM Mix 96.1
- WRCD-FM 101.5 The Fox
