= Madrid, New York =

- Town
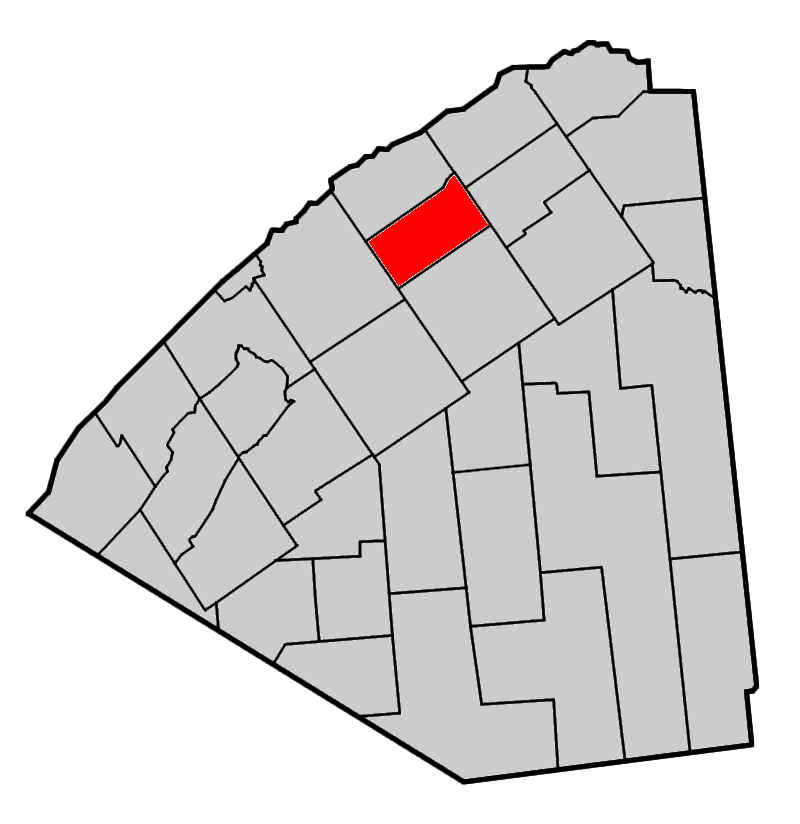
- Map highlighting Madrid's location within St. Lawrence County.

- Location within New York Location within the United States
- Coordinates: 44°45′44″N 75°7′37″W
- Country: United States
- State: New York
- County: St. Lawrence

Area
  - Total: 53.58 sq mi (138.78 km^{2})
  - Land: 52.98 sq mi (137.23 km^{2})
  - Water: 0.60 sq mi (1.55 km^{2})
- Elevation: 308 ft (94 m)

Population (2020)
  - Total: 1,744
  - Density: 31.7/sq mi (12.23/km^{2})
- Time zone: UTC-5 (Eastern (EST))
  - Summer (DST): UTC-4 (EDT)
- FIPS code: 36-44490
- GNIS feature ID: 0979183
- Website: https://www.townofmadridny.gov/

Madrid (/ˈmædrɪd/ MUH-drid is a town in St. Lawrence County, New York. The population was 1,735 at the time of the 2010 census. The town is named after the capital of Spain. Madrid is in the northern part of the county, north of Canton.

Madrid-Waddington Central School serves the town of Madrid, but outside the population center.

== History ==
Madrid was first settled around 1801. The town was one of the four original towns created along with the county in 1802. It was formed from the town of Lisbon. The south part of Madrid was lost to form the town of Potsdam in 1806. The town gave up territory for the new town of Waddington in 1859.

During the War of 1812, Madrid, due to its proximity to Canada, developed a town militia, the "South Madrid Militia". Madrid was raided by the Canadians in February 1814.

After a more diverse economy, including mining and logging, the primary industry became farming, and the commercial presence is solely to support the residents.

The First Congregational Church of Madrid was listed on the National Register of Historic Places in 2010.

== Geography ==
According to the United States Census Bureau, the town has a total area of 53.6 square miles (139 km^{2}), of which 52.9 square miles (137 km^{2}) is land and 0.7 square miles (1.8 km^{2}) (1.25%) is water.

The Grasse River flows through the town and through the hamlet of Madrid. Brandy Brook flows through the northwestern part of Madrid.

Madrid hamlet lies approximately halfway between the towns of Potsdam and Waddington along New York State Route 345. Madrid is home to the Madrid Golf Course, a nine-hole public golf course located on County Route 14 near the heart of Madrid hamlet. New York State Route 310 is an east–west highway passing south of the hamlet.

== Demographics ==
Historical population
Census	Pop.	Note	%±
1820	1,930		—
1830	3,459		79.2%
1840	4,511		30.4%
1850	4,856		7.6%
1860	1,978		−59.3%
1870	2,071		4.7%
1880	2,145		3.6%
1890	1,969		−8.2%
1900	1,668		−15.3%
1910	1,457		−12.6%
1920	1,399		−4.0%
1930	1,388		−0.8%
1940	1,383		−0.4%
1950	1,551		12.1%
1960	1,623		4.6%
1970	1,635		0.7%
1980	1,852		13.3%
1990	1,568		−15.3%
2000	1,828		16.6%
2010	1,735		−5.1%
2020	1,744		0.5%

As of the census of 2000, there were 1,828 people, 638 households, and 458 families residing in the town. The population density was 34.5 inhabitants per square mile (13.3/km^{2}). There were 763 housing units at an average density of 14.4 per square mile (5.6/km^{2}). The racial makeup of the town was 97.43% White, 1.37% African American, 0.49% Native American, 0.11% Asian, 0.05% Pacific Islander, 0.05% from other races, and 0.49% from two or more races. Hispanic or Latino of any race were 0.93% of the population.

There were 638 households, out of which 34.6% had children under the age of 18 living with them, 56.6% were married couples living together, 9.2% had a female householder with no husband present, and 28.1% were non-families. 21.3% of all households were made up of individuals, and 10.0% had someone living alone who was 65 years of age or older. The average household size was 2.68 and the average family size was 3.04.

In the town, the population was spread out, with 26.0% under the age of 18, 6.0% from 18 to 24, 29.6% from 25 to 44, 25.8% from 45 to 64, and 12.6% who were 65 years of age or older. The median age was 38 years. For every 100 females, there were 104.7 males. For every 100 females age 18 and over, there were 100.9 males.

The median income for a household in the town was $33,309, and the median income for a family was $40,625. Males had a median income of $32,120 versus $23,417 for females. The per capita income for the town was $13,720. About 14.4% of families and 20.2% of the population were below the poverty line, including 25.8% of those under age 18 and 12.9% of those age 65 or over.

== Communities and locations in Madrid ==
- Allen Corners – A location in the eastern part of the town on NY-310.
- Chamberlain Corners – A location in the northeastern part of Madrid on County Road 44 by the Grasse River.
- Chipman – A hamlet by the northwestern town line.
- Cogswell Corners – A location northwest of Madrid village on County Road 31.
- Dixon Corners – A location in the eastern part of the town on NY-310.
- Madrid – The hamlet of Madrid was known, before 1826, as "Roberts Mills", "Grass River Falls", and "Columbia Village". This is the principal community in the town and is on the north bank of the Grass River.
- Madrid Springs – A hamlet southwest of Madrid village on County Road 14.
- St. Lawrence State Forest – A conservation area in the eastern part of Madrid.
- Smiths Corners – A location northeast of Madrid village on County Road 14.
- Turnbull Corner – A hamlet north of Madrid village on NY-345.

== Notable people ==
- Ellsworth Burnett, politician in Wisconsin
- Matt Curley, college ice hockey coach
- George Z. Erwin, politician
- Charles C. Montgomery, politician
- James F. Pierce, lawyer and politician
- Oliver S. Powell, farmer, miller, and merchant
- Cyrus Walbridge, politician and 28th mayor of St. Louis
