= Lorraine J. Pitkin =

American women's activist (1845–1922)

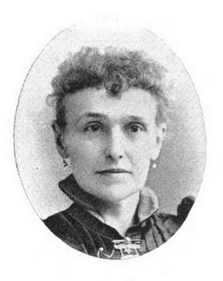
Lorraine J. Pitkin

Lorraine J. Pitkin (July 15, 1845 - 1922) was an American women's activist and political postmaster. She served as Most Worthy Grand Matron (1880–86) and Right Worthy Grand Secretary of the Order of the Eastern Star (O.E.S.) of the Illinois Grand Chapter.

== Early years and education ==
Lorraine J. Dickinson was born July 15, 1845, in Waddington, New York, a farmer's daughter. When she was about five years of age her parents moved to Illinois, settling near Elgin.

At the age of eleven she was sent to Rutland, to attend a young ladies' seminary at that place, where she remained until 1861, when she returned to Illinois.

When her widowed mother needed her assistance, she took a position as a clerk in a store, her earnings going towards the maintenance of the family.

== American Civil War ==
At the start of the American Civil War, among those who responded was Capt. E. P. Pitkin, who enlisted at Annapolis, Maryland, in the quartermaster's department. At the Battle of Stones River, he had charge of an ammunition train, and was captured, managed to escape. He was soon after promoted to Assistant Quartermaster, with the rank of captain. He entered the service when the first guns were fired on Fort Sumter, and was appointed colonel and chief Quartermaster of the defense of New Orleans. Before his death, as a reward for faithful service, his commission as Colonel was issued — too late however, to secure to his family a Colonel's pension.

He spent about a year in Brazos, Texas, as master of marine transportation. While stationed in Chicago, he met and married Lorraine J. Dickinson, the marriage occurring October 22, 1863. A few days after the wedding, an order called him to New Orleans. After an absence of seven months, he returned on a month's furlough, going back to his post of duty on June 6, 1864. He died on October 6. An escort brought the remains to the bereaved young widow, and they were taken to the family burying plot in Cleveland, Ohio. Their daughter was born March 1865.

== Career ==
=== Order of the Eastern Star ===
Pitkin's Eastern Star work began in 1866, when she joined Miriam Family, which two years later was reorganized in chapter form, adopting the Michigan ritual, and of this she was elected Worthy President, serving in that position about a year. July 18, 1877, Pitkin organized Queen Esther Chapter No. 41; she was its first Worthy Matron.

At the Grand Chapter meeting of Illinois in 1877, she was appointed Grand Marshal, and the following year was elected Grand Matron. At the meeting of the General Grand Chapter in 1878, Pitkin was elected Right Worthy Associate Grand Matron. She became Worthy Grand Matron of Illinois in 1879. In her address that year to the Grand Chapter, she said: "If our Chapters had something to labor for, some little bare feet to clothe, or heartsick Souls to comfort, there would be no time for contention and strife; the seeds of discord would never be sown and a spirit of harmony and unity Would prevail."

At the meeting of the General Grand Chapter in August 1880, in Chicago, she was elected Most Worthy Grand Matron, which she filled for the three successive years. Her report at the session of 1883 held in San Francisco, California, showed the same energy and wise legislation that had characterized her previous work.

In 1883, she was elected Right Worthy Grand Secretary, which showed the appreciation of her associates for Pitkin's business ability. However, she declined it in favor of the retiring incumbent. Six years passed, and at the Sixth Triennial Session in the city of Indianapolis, in 1889, she was again elected Right Worthy Grand Secretary, which position she filled so efficiently as to receive a re-election in 1892.

For three years, she had charge of an O. E. S. Department in the American Home. In connection with Jennie E. Mathews, Past Most Worthy Grand Matron, she compiled and published a collection of music for chapter use, Gems of Song. Another publication was the Floral Work, which was generally used throughout the Order. Pitkin held the copyright for the O.E.S. membership badge. Several times, she served as delegate to Department and National Conventions of the O.E.S. Pitkin agitated the question of an objective point for the publication, Our Eastern Star almost since its conception, and had a money interest in nearly every Home or Home-interest in the U. S. She was one of the strongest factors in the organizing of the Masonic Orphans Home and Eastern Star and Masonic Home at Macon, Illinois. She gave the first US$100 to start the fund for the O. E. S. Home, the work beginning in 1895, and served on the Home Board for two years. Pitkin's O.E.S. service lasted over four decades. Till the later years, the salary paid in her office was not more than would be paid to a clerk.

=== Politics ===
In 1888, she was elected postmaster of the Illinois House of Representatives, and after faithfully serving that body, she was elected in the following year to a similar position in the Illinois Senate. The members of the 36th General Assembly presented her a watch, and in further recognition of their appreciation of her ability and efficiency, gave her a flattering recommend, to which the name of every member of that assembly was signed.

=== Women's activism ===
On behalf of the O.E.S., she was involved in the World's Congress of Representative Women, which accorded to Pitkin a day given wholly to an O. E. S. program, May 16, 1893. In 1902, Pitkin was honored by an appointment on the Board of Directors of the World's Fair Fraternal Building Association held in the city of St. Louis, Missouri, and her experience and judgment aided greatly in this work. She was asked again to lend her aid and presence at the Lewis and Clark Exposition in Portland, Oregon, in 1905, where her large acquaintance and Eastern Star knowledge added to its success. She was also an earnest and devoted member of the Woman's Relief Corps, serving as president of the Illinois organization.

== Personal life ==
Pitkin's family consisted of her daughter, Mrs. H. Judson Decker, and two granddaughters, Lorraine and Maude. She died in 1922.
