= Hannawa Falls, New York =

- Hamlet
- Location within New York Location within the United States
- Coordinates: 44°36′44″N 74°58′16″W
- Country: United States
- State: New York
- County: St. Lawrence

Area
  - Total: 5.412 sq mi (14.02 km^{2})
  - Land: 5.110 sq mi (13.23 km^{2})
  - Water: 0.302 sq mi (0.78 km^{2})
- Elevation: 558 ft (170 m)

Population (2010)
  - Total: 1,042
  - Density: 203.9/sq mi (78.73/km^{2})
- Time zone: UTC-5 (Eastern (EST))
  - Summer (DST): UTC-4 (EDT)
- ZIP code: 13647
- Area codes: 315 & 680
- GNIS feature ID: 976407

Hannawa Falls is a hamlet and census-designated place in the town of Pierrepont in St. Lawrence County, New York, United States. As of the 2020 census, Hannawa Falls had a population of 975. Hannawa Falls has a post office with ZIP code 13647. New York State Route 56 passes through the community.

Hannawa Falls is a small hamlet located in the town of Pierrepont in St. Lawrence County, New York State. Nestled between the scenic Adirondack foothills and St. Lawrence Valley, the area is known for its natural beauty, peaceful rural atmosphere, and proximity to the Raquette River, which flows through the hamlet and features picturesque waterfalls and hydroelectric dams. Hannawa Pond, approximately 3 miles in length, is used for recreation, although it is a closed pond with no public access.

The community is primarily residential, with a mix of year-round homes and seasonal camps. Hannawa Falls is close to Potsdam, a nearby village that offers more commercial and educational services, including Clarkson University and SUNY Potsdam.

The area appeals to nature lovers, with abundant opportunities for hiking, fishing, kayaking, and wildlife watching. It is home to Chip's Place, a local convenient store and Jake's, a popular restaurant overlooking Hannawa Pond. Coming on 2026 is a Dollar General store, which is being built on the former grounds of the Birches - an iconic bar that was closed a few years ago.

== Education ==
The census-designated place is mostly in the Potsdam Central School District. A portion of the census-designated place is in the Parishville-Hopkinton Central School District and Colton-Pierrepont Central School District.
