= United States Post Office (Potsdam, New York) =

- US Post Office-Potsdam
- U.S. National Register of Historic Places
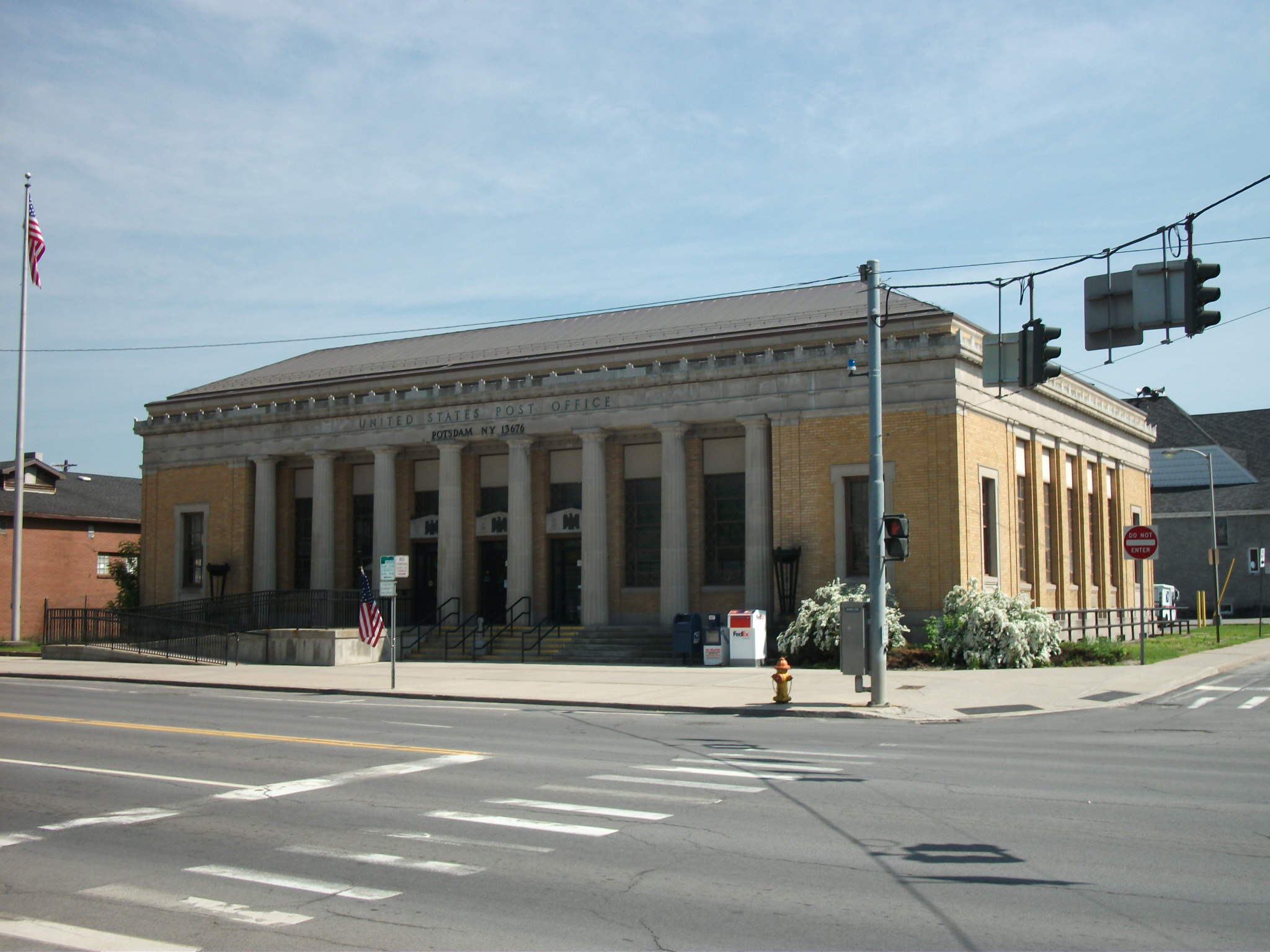
- U.S. Post Office, May 2011

- Location within New York Location within the United States
- Location: 21 Elm St., Potsdam, New York
- Coordinates: 44°40′10″N 74°59′5″W
- Area: less than one acre
- Built: 1932
- Architect: Wetmore, James A.; US Treasury Department
- Architectural style: Classical Revival
- MPS: US Post Offices in New York State, 1858–1943, TR
- NRHP reference No.: 88002410
- Added to NRHP: May 11, 1989

US Post Office-Potsdam is a historic post office building located at Potsdam in St. Lawrence County, New York. It was designed and built in 1932–1933, and is one of a number of post offices in New York State designed by the Office of the Supervising Architect of the Treasury Department, James A. Wetmore. The building is in the Classical Revival style and is a two-story, U-shaped structure clad in limestone. The main facade features a colossal seven-bay recessed portico supported by Doric order columns and flanked by Grecian style cast-iron urns.

It was listed on the National Register of Historic Places in 1989.
