= Hermon (hamlet), New York =

Hermon, New York
- Hamlet and CDP
- Location within the state of New York
- Coordinates: 44°28′1″N 75°13′45″W
- Country: United States
- State: New York
- County: St. Lawrence
- Incorporated: 1887
- Dissolved: December 31, 2016

Area
  - Total: 0.49 sq mi (1.27 km^{2})
  - Land: 0.49 sq mi (1.27 km^{2})
  - Water: 0 sq mi (0.00 km^{2})
- Elevation: 499 ft (152 m)

Population (2020)
  - Total: 436
  - Density: 886.0/sq mi (342.07/km^{2})
- Time zone: UTC-5 (Eastern (EST))
  - Summer (DST): UTC-4 (EDT)
- FIPS code: 36-34165
- GNIS feature ID: 0976430

Hermon is a hamlet (and census-designated place) in St. Lawrence County, New York, United States. The population was 422 at the 2010 census.

The hamlet is in the northern part of the Town of Hermon and is southwest of Canton. It was an incorporated village from 1887 to 2016.

== History ==
This was the twenty-fourth town erected by an act of the Legislature passed April 17, 1830. Hermon was originally organized under the name of Depeau, after Francis Depeau, once proprietor of a large tract of land in Jefferson County. He was also interested in the middle third of this territory, which had passed from McCormick to George Lewis, July 12, 1804, who sold to John and Curtis Bolton, August 1, 1823, and they sold to Depeau, June 6, 1828. He sold to Sarah, wife of John Bolton. May 3. 1830.

The town was formed from De Kalb and Edwards April 17, 1830. The first town meeting was held at the school-house near Nathaniel Kent's May 4, 1830, and the following officers elected: William Teall, supervisor; Benjamin Healey, town clerk; Wilkes Richardson, Isaac C. Pool, Silas Williams, assessors; Martin L. Cook, John Matoon, over-. seers of the poor; Simeon Peterson, Jesse Worden, Shubael Parker, commissioners of highways; Wilkes Richardson, Robert Gotham, Harry Tanner, commissioners of schools; Benjamin Healey, Aaron Teall, C. D. Morehouse, inspectors of public schools; Charles O. Redfield, collector; Ariel Wrisley, Charles C. Redfield, constables.

The town originally embraced the township of Fitzwilliam and a strip one mile (1.6 km) by six from the southwest side of De Kalb. On November 17, 1852, the supervisors annexed a tract from the southeastern corner of the town of Edwards, leaving in Hermon 36,686 acres (148.46 km^{2}).

The name of the town was changed to Hermon, February 28, 1834, as there was a Depeauville in Jefferson County. A post-office named Hermon had been established in the northeastern part of the town December 28, 1828.

Many of the pioneers of this town came from Vermont and were industrious and hardy people. The first white settler was James Taylor, who made a small clearing in the western part circa 1805. Philemon Stewart, Ariel Inman and Rufus Hopkins came in soon afterwards, but left on the outbreak of the War of 1812 and did not return. Thomas Tanner came in March 1809, and spent the remainder of his long life there.

The first road leading through this town was that from Russell to De Kaib, which was opened just prior to the War of 1812. In 1818 the road from De Kalb to what is now Hermon village was opened.

The first school taught in the town was kept in the house of David McCollum in the winter of 1817-18 by William D. Moore.

The first marriage in the town was that of Ashbel Tryon and Harriet McCollum, July 4, 1821; and the first death was that of Peter, infant son of Germain Sutherland, in 1818.

A post office was established at Hermon on December 20, 1828, with Benjamin Healey as postmaster. The mails then came in from De Kalb, carried on horseback by Henry Tanner.

David McCollum settled in 1812 and had four sons: Martin, John, Jefferson D. and Samuel. The latter took the homestead. Roger Story came in 1813. Germain Sutherland settled in 1816; he was father of Moses H. and one of his daughters married H. B. Hamlin, and another Rosalve Healey.

Other early settlers were Joseph H. Baird, One Gibbons, William Teall (the first supervisor), Benjamin Healey (the first town clerk, and who left numerous descendants), Clark Main, Ralph Fisher, Lorenzo H. Sheldon, Chester Winslow, Shubael Parker, Wilkes Richardson (one of the first assessors and father of Ferdinand and King R,), William D. Gilmore, William H. Underwood. Henry Reed, Orlando Babbitt, Dr. H. Alexander, Reuben L. Willson, John Gardner, and Asa, his son, Frank Matteson, Ransom and John Day, Noah Hamilton, Ezra Leonard, Alexander Brown, Almon and Amos V. Farnsworth, Silas Williams, A. F. Gates, a prominent dairyman and farmer, William Rasback, Thomas Thornhill, Alvin A. Corey, William A. Scripter, E. J. Stewart, son of Philemon Stewart, an early settler. Many of these men became prominent in the community and sonic of them left descendants in this section.

The early industries of this town were connected with lumbering, the clearing of land and raising such crops as were needed by the people. But early in the history of this locality its excellent adaptability to grazing became apparent and more attention was given to stock-raising and dairying, and in recent years the latter industry has given it a rank among the best towns in the county. Cheese is the principal product.

There are large deposits of hematite iron ore in the town and early attracted attention, and it was long believed they would prove to be a source of wealth. Mining operations were begun on an extensive scale in 1864, and J. W. Lowden, an eastern capitalist, also erected a furnace at Cooper's Falls in De Kalb. Mr. Lowden invested a large sum of money, mostly in preliminary work, In 1872 he sold out his whole interest to the Union Iron Company of Buffalo, John Webb of Gouverneur acting as local agent of the company. The "hard times "of 1873-4 came on, and that fact was given as a reason for cessation of the enterprise, which has never been resumed. Like most of the other attempts to successfully mine and produce iron in this county, there seem to have been conditions and circumstances which, coupled with the cheap production elsewhere, rendered it impossible to profitably pursue the industry here.

The Village of Hermon was officially dissolved on December 31, 2016.

== Geography ==
Hermon is located at 44°28′0″N 75°13′45″W (44.466873, -75.229274).

According to the United States Census Bureau, the hamlet has a total area of 0.4 square mile (1.0 km^{2}), all land.

The community is on County Road 17, several miles southeast of U.S. Route 11.

== Demographics ==
Historical population
Census	Pop.	Note	%±
1870	573		—
1880	522		−8.9%
1890	473		−9.4%
1900	503		6.3%
1910	587		16.7%
1920	622		6.0%
1930	527		−15.3%
1940	487		−7.6%
1950	547		12.3%
1960	612		11.9%
1970	521		−14.9%
1980	490		−6.0%
1990	407		−16.9%
2000	402		−1.2%
2010	422		5.0%
2020	436		3.3%
U.S. Decennial Census

As of the census of 2000, there were 402 people, 151 households, and 102 families residing in what was then a village. The population density was 1,063.9 inhabitants per square mile (410.8/km^{2}). There were 161 housing units at an average density of 426.1 per square mile (164.5/km^{2}). The racial makeup of the village was 98.26% White, 1.24% Black or African American, and 0.50% from two or more races. Hispanic or Latino of any race were 0.75% of the population.

There were 151 households, out of which 32.5% had children under the age of 18 living with them, 44.4% were married couples living together, 13.2% had a female householder with no husband present, and 31.8% were non-families. 21.9% of all households were made up of individuals, and 7.9% had someone living alone who was 65 years of age or older. The average household size was 2.56 and the average family size was 2.98.

In the village, the population was spread out, with 26.4% under the age of 18, 7.2% from 18 to 24, 26.6% from 25 to 44, 24.6% from 45 to 64, and 15.2% who were 65 years of age or older. The median age was 38 years. For every 100 females, there were 103.0 males. For every 100 females age 18 and over, there were 93.5 males.

The median income for a household in the village was $31,477, and the median income for a family was $34,583. Males had a median income of $32,813 versus $22,969 for females. The per capita income for the village was $13,463. About 16.5% of families and 21.3% of the population were below the poverty line, including 27.1% of those under age 18 and 22.4% of those age 65 or over.

== Education ==
The census-designated place is in the Hermon-DeKalb Central School District.
