= DeKalb Junction, New York =

- Hamlet
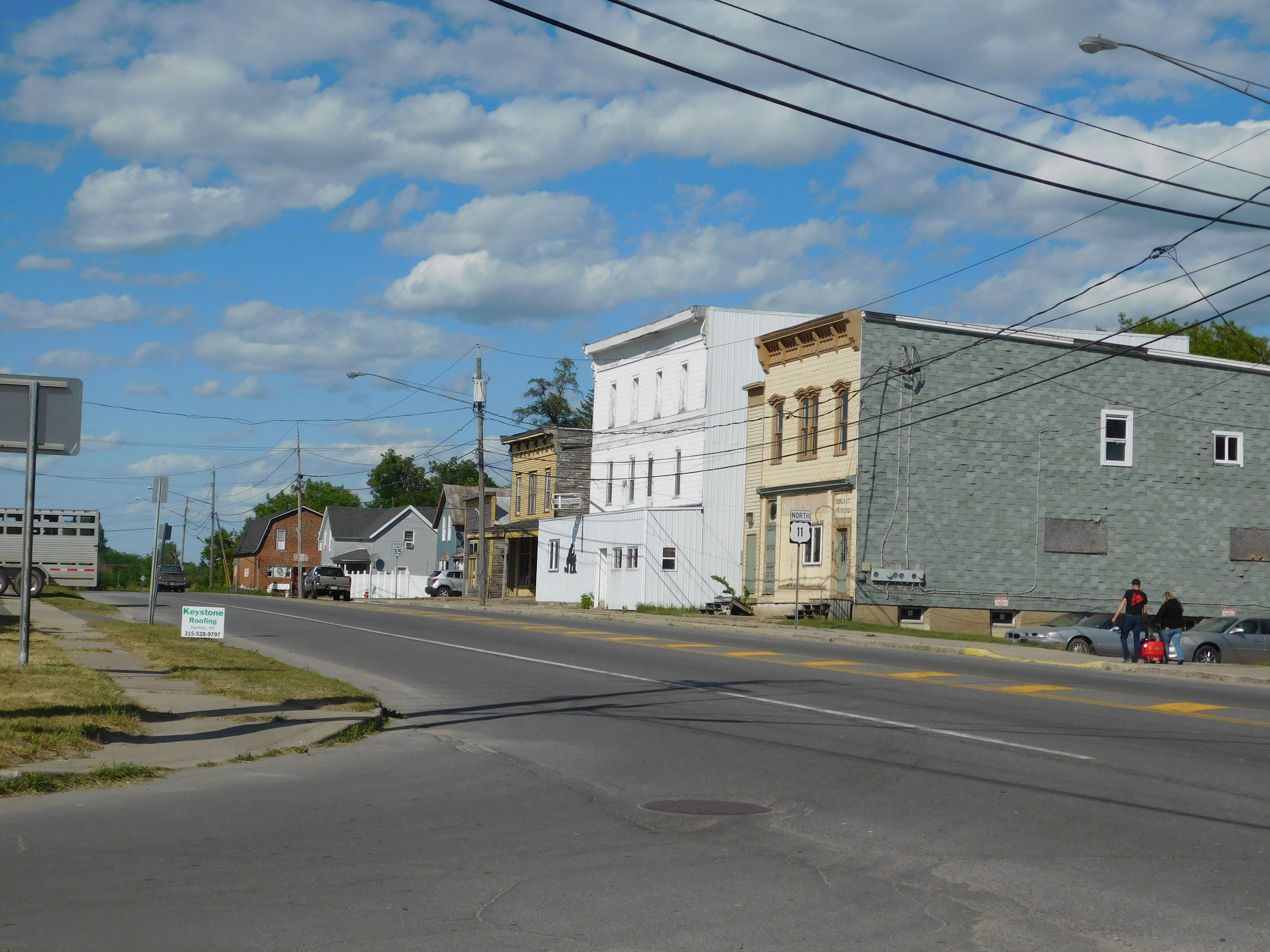
- U.S. Route 11 through DeKalb Junction.

- Location within New York Location within the United States
- Coordinates: 44°30′18″N 75°16′26″W
- Country: United States
- State: New York
- County: St. Lawrence

Area
  - Total: 3.945 sq mi (10.22 km^{2})
  - Land: 3.883 sq mi (10.06 km^{2})
  - Water: 0.062 sq mi (0.16 km^{2})
- Elevation: 449 ft (137 m)

Population (2010)
  - Total: 519
  - Density: 134/sq mi (51.6/km^{2})
- Time zone: UTC-5 (Eastern (EST))
  - Summer (DST): UTC-4 (EDT)
- ZIP code: 13630
- Area codes: 315 & 680
- GNIS feature ID: 976226

DeKalb Junction is a hamlet and census-designated place located in the town of DeKalb in Saint Lawrence County, New York, United States. As of the 2020 census, DeKalb Junction had a population of 485. DeKalb Junction has a post office with ZIP code 13630. U.S. Route 11 passes through the community.

== Geography ==
According to the U.S. Census Bureau, the community has an area of 3.945 square miles (10.22 km^{2}); 3.883 square miles (10.06 km^{2}) of its area is land, and 0.062 square miles (0.16 km^{2}) is water.

== Education ==
The census-designated place is in the Hermon-DeKalb Central School District.
