= Waddington, New York =

Coordinates: 44°51′50″N 75°11′49″W

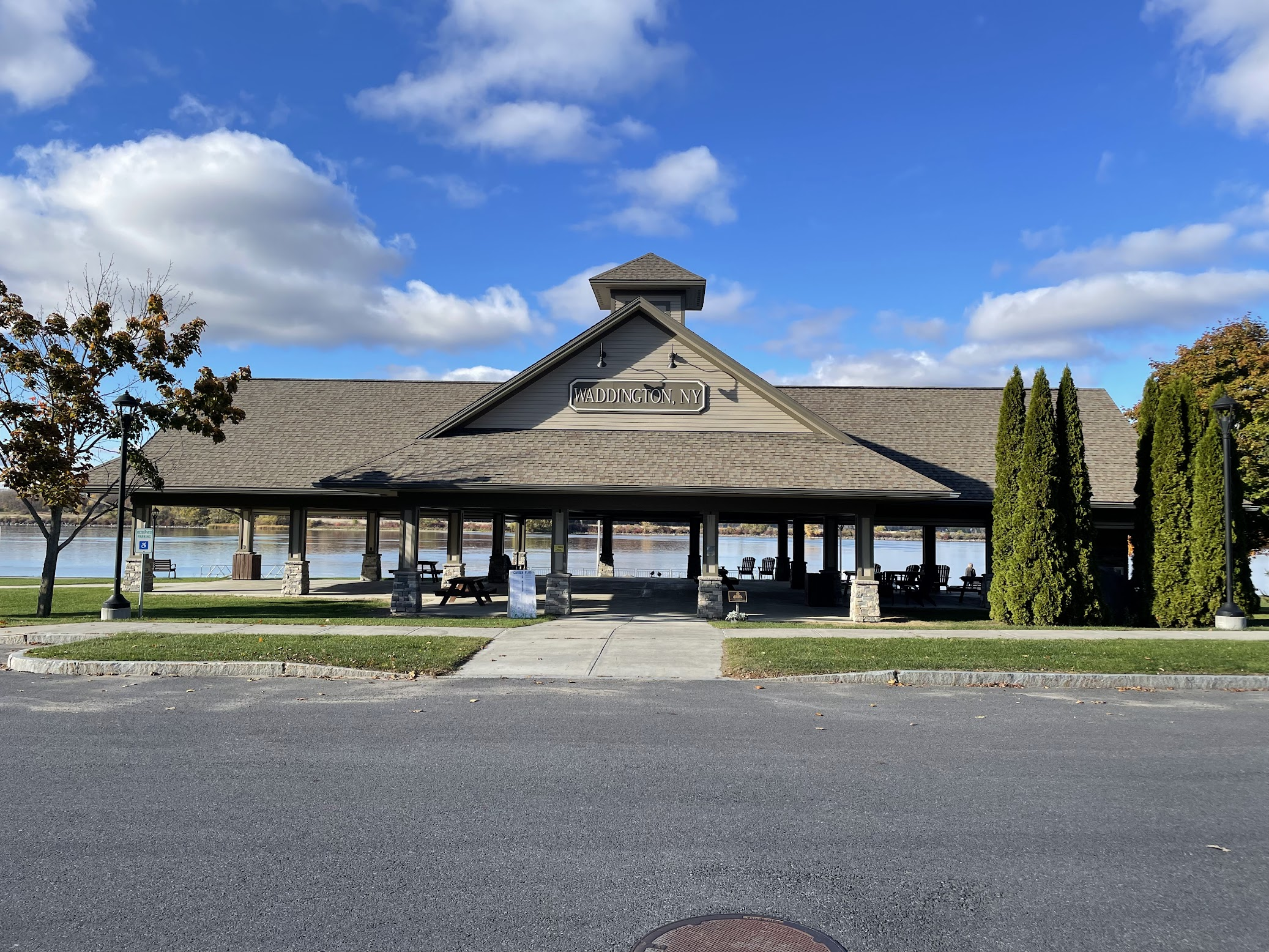
Waddington Pavilion on the St. Lawrence River

Waddington is a town in St. Lawrence County, New York, United States. The population was 2,266 at the 2010 census. The town was named after its principal village.

The Town of Waddington has a village, also called Waddington. Both town and village are on the northern edge of the county, north of Canton.

== History ==
The first settlement took place in 1797 near Hamilton village, later Waddington, but an anonymous family was already living there.

The community of Waddington formally established itself as an incorporated village in 1839, while still part of the Town of Madrid.

The town was formed in 1859 from the Town of Madrid.

A Battle in the War of 1812 took place in Waddington, at the St. Lawrence River.

The Bassmaster Elite Series Championships have taken place multiple times in Waddington at the St. Lawrence River.

== Geography ==
According to the United States Census Bureau, the town has a total area of 58.0 square miles (150.2 km^{2}), of which 51.6 square miles (133.5 km^{2}) is land and 6.4 square miles (16.7 km^{2}) (11.11%) is water.

The St. Lawrence River defines the northern town line, which is the international border between the United States and Canada (Ontario). The Grasse River flows northward past the eastern part of Waddington, partly defining the town line.

New York State Route 37 follows the south bank of the St. Lawrence River. It intersects New York State Route 345, a north–south highway, at Waddington village.

== Demographics ==
Historical population
Census	Pop.	Note	%±
1860	2,768		—
1870	2,599		−6.1%
1880	2,608		0.3%
1890	2,200		−15.6%
1900	2,001		−9.0%
1910	1,888		−5.6%
1920	1,742		−7.7%
1930	1,709		−1.9%
1940	1,645		−3.7%
1950	1,745		6.1%
1960	1,972		13.0%
1970	2,054		4.2%
1980	2,116		3.0%
1990	1,990		−6.0%
2000	2,212		11.2%
2010	2,266		2.4%
2020	2,235		−1.4%
U.S. Decennial Census

As of the census of 2000, there were 2,212 people, 886 households, and 612 families residing in the town. The population density was 42.9 inhabitants per square mile (16.6/km^{2}). There were 1,035 housing units at an average density of 20.1 per square mile (7.8/km^{2}). The racial makeup of the town was 98.46% White, 0.18% Black or African American, 0.45% Native American, 0.36% Asian, 0.05% from other races, and 0.50% from two or more races. Hispanic or Latino of any race were 0.27% of the population.

There were 886 households, out of which 29.1% had children under the age of 18 living with them, 56.5% were married couples living together, 8.8% had a female householder with no husband present, and 30.9% were non-families. 24.5% of all households were made up of individuals, and 10.8% had someone living alone who was 65 years of age or older. The average household size was 2.48 and the average family size was 2.93.

In the town, the population was spread out, with 23.4% under the age of 18, 6.7% from 18 to 24, 28.2% from 25 to 44, 27.2% from 45 to 64, and 14.5% who were 65 years of age or older. The median age was 39 years. For every 100 females, there were 95.4 males. For every 100 females age 18 and over, there were 94.5 males.

The median income for a household in the town was $35,952, and the median income for a family was $42,357. Males had a median income of $30,547 versus $22,135 for females. The per capita income for the town was $18,311. About 5.5% of families and 11.2% of the population were below the poverty line, including 12.5% of those under age 18 and 8.0% of those age 65 or over.

== Communities and locations in Waddington ==
- Chamberlains Corners – A location by the Grasse River on County Road 44.
- Chase Mills – A location at the eastern town line on County Road 14 by the Grasse River.
- Chipman – A hamlet by the southern town line at the junction of County Roads 31 and 33. The Chase Mills Inn was listed on the National Register of Historic Places in 1978.
- Clark Point – A projection into the St. Lawerence River east of Waddington village.
- Coles Creek – A wide stream that partly defines the eastern town line.
- Coles Creek State Park – A state park in the northeastern corner of the town.
- Dalton Crossing – A hamlet east of Waddington village near Coles Creek.
- Drews Corner – A location southeast of Waddington village on County Road 44.
- Halfway House Corners – A hamlet on NY-345 south of Waddington village.
- Henrys Corners – A hamlet near the western town line on County Road 31A.
- Leishman Point – A peninsula in the St. Lawrence River, between Ogden Island and Whitehouse Bay.
- Ogden Isle – An island in the St. Lawrence River near Waddingon village.
- Sucker Brook – A stream that enters the St. Lawrence River near Waddington village.
- Waddington – The Village of Waddington in the northern part of the town at the junction of NY-37 and NY-345 by the St. Lawrence River.
- Wagner Corners – A hamlet west of Chipman, near the western town line on County Road 31.
- Whitehouse Bay – A bay of the St. Lawrence River, west of Ogden Island.

== Notable people ==
- Macklyn Arbuckle, actor
- Lorraine J. Pitkin, social activist, political postmaster
- Lyman W. Redington, attorney and politician
- James Ricalton, teacher, traveler, inventor
