= Waddington (village), New York =

Waddington, New York
- Village
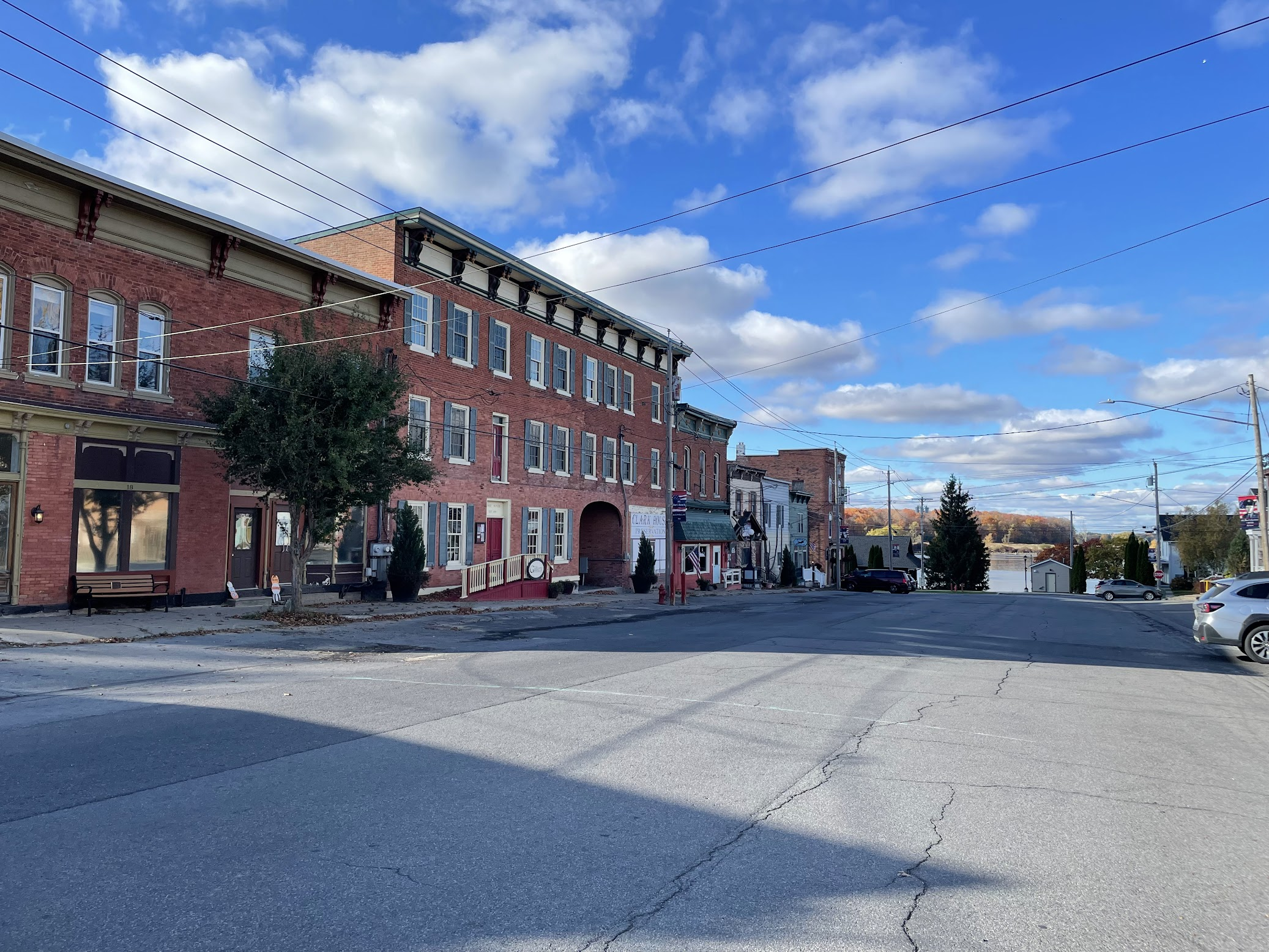

- Location within the State of New York
- Coordinates: 44°51′50″N 75°11′49″W
- Country: United States
- State: New York
- County: St. Lawrence

Area
  - Total: 2.37 sq mi (6.13 km^{2})
  - Land: 2.18 sq mi (5.65 km^{2})
  - Water: 0.19 sq mi (0.49 km^{2})
- Elevation: 272 ft (83 m)

Population (2020)
  - Total: 937
  - Density: 429.8/sq mi (165.95/km^{2})
- Time zone: UTC-5 (Eastern (EST))
  - Summer (DST): UTC-4 (EDT)
- FIPS code: 36-77728
- GNIS feature ID: 0977173
- Website: https://www.waddingtonnewyork.com/

Waddington is a village in the Town of Waddington in St. Lawrence County, New York, United States. The population was 972 at the 2010 census. The village is named after Joshua Waddington.

The Village of Waddington is at the northern edge of the town and is north of Canton.

== History ==
The first settlers arrived around 1798.

The village was originally called "Hamilton" (after Alexander Hamilton) but changed to Waddington in 1818. Joshua Waddington was a friend of Hamilton and one of the original landowners. The village was incorporated in 1839. When the Town of Waddington has formed afterwards, it adopted the village name.

During the construction of the St. Lawrence Seaway, part of the village needed to be relocated and some of the old industrial areas were destroyed.

The Waddington Historic District was listed on the National Register of Historic Places in 1992.

== Geography ==
According to the United States Census Bureau, the village has a total area of 2.4 sq mi (6.2 km^{2}), of which 2.2 sq mi (5.7 km^{2}) is land and 0.2 sq mi (0.52 km^{2}) (8.82%) is water.

The village is located near the St. Lawrence River and the international border with Canada. In fronts Ogden Island in the St. Lawrence River.

Waddington is New York State Route 37 and New York State Route 345 junctions. County Road 44 serves the village from the southeast.

== Demographics ==
Historical population
Census	Pop.	Note	%±
1860	789		—
1870	710		−10.0%
1880	977		37.6%
1890	900		−7.9%
1900	757		−15.9%
1910	731		−3.4%
1920	702		−4.0%
1930	679		−3.3%
1940	671		−1.2%
1950	819		22.1%
1960	921		12.5%
1970	955		3.7%
1980	980		2.6%
1990	944		−3.7%
2000	923		−2.2%
2010	972		5.3%
2020	937		−3.6%
U.S. Decennial Census

As of the census of 2000, there were 923 people, 405 households, and 259 families residing in the village. The population density was 425.3 inhabitants per square mile (164.2/km^{2}). There were 452 housing units at an average density of 208.3 per square mile (80.4/km^{2}). The racial makeup of the village was 99.13% White, 0.33% Native American, 0.11% from other races, and 0.43% from two or more races. Hispanic or Latino of any race were 0.22% of the population.

There were 405 households, of which 21.7% had children under 18 living with them, 53.8% were married couples living together, 7.4% had a female householder with no husband present, and 36.0% were non-families. 31.1% of all households comprised individuals, and 15.3% had someone living alone who was 65 years of age or older. The average household size was 2.26, and the average family size was 2.79.

In the village, the population was spread out, with 18.2% under the age of 18, 7.2% from 18 to 24, 23.4% from 25 to 44, 30.8% from 45 to 64, and 20.5% who were 65 years of age or older. The median age was 46 years. For every 100 females, there were 93.1 males. For every 100 females aged 18 and over, there were 89.2 males.

The median income for a household in the village was $39,615, and the median income for a family was $46,389. Males had a median income of $39,583 versus $24,773 for females. The per capita income for the village was $22,568. About 5.8% of families and 11.3% of the population were below the poverty line, including 16.2% of those under age 18 and 6.8% of those age 65 or over.

== Education ==
The school district is Madrid-Waddington Central School District.

== Notable person ==
- James Ricalton, [Travel Photographer]
