= St. Lawrence County, New York =

County in New York, United States

- County
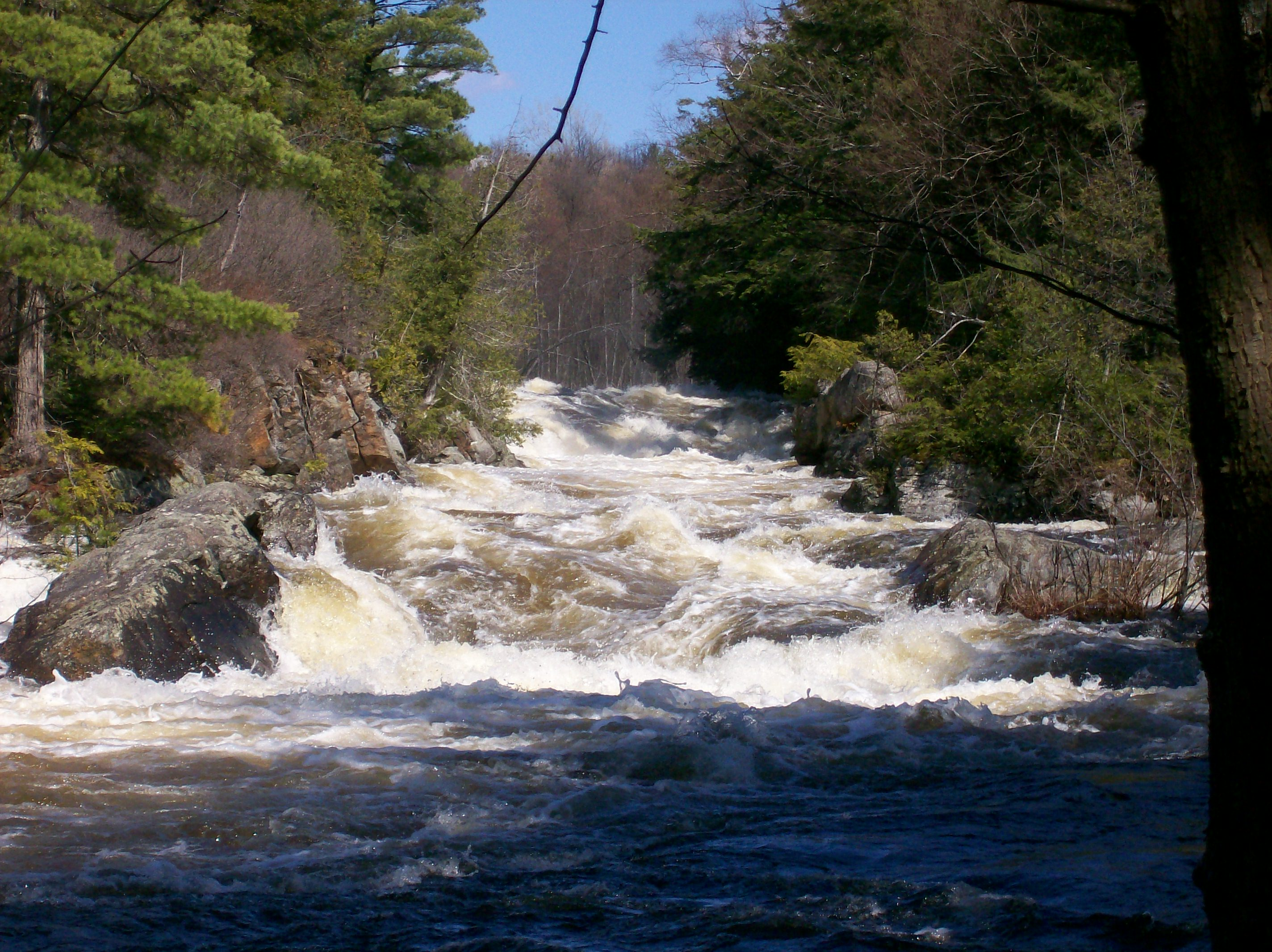
- The Raquette River in Colton, New York

- Flag Seal

- Location within the U.S. state of New York
- Coordinates: 44°30′N 75°04′W
- Country: United States
- State: New York
- Founded: 1802
- Named for: Saint Lawrence River ultimately named after Saint Lawrence
- Seat: Canton

Area
  - Total: 2,821 sq mi (7,310 km^{2})
  - Land: 2,680 sq mi (6,900 km^{2})
  - Water: 141 sq mi (370 km^{2}) 5.0%

Population (2020)
  - Total: 108,505
  - Estimate (2025): 105,488 ▼
  - Density: 39.6/sq mi (15.3/km^{2})
- Time zone: UTC−5 (Eastern)
  - Summer (DST): UTC−4 (EDT)
- Congressional district: 21st
- Website: stlawco.gov

St. Lawrence County is the northernmost county in the U.S. state of New York. As of the 2020 census, the population was 108,505. The county seat is Canton. The county is named for the Saint Lawrence River. This was as named by early French explorer Jacques Cartier for the Christian saint Lawrence of Rome, as he visited the river on the saint's feast day. The county is part of the North Country region of the state.

St. Lawrence County comprises the Ogdensburg–Massena, NY Micropolitan Statistical Area and is New York's largest county by area.

== History ==
When counties were established by England in the Province of New York in 1683, the present St. Lawrence County was part of Albany County. This was an enormous territory, including the northern part of New York State as well as all of the present State of Vermont and, in theory, extending westward to the Pacific Ocean. The county was reduced in size on July 3, 1766, by the creation of Cumberland County, and further on March 16, 1770, by the creation of Gloucester County, both containing territory now in Vermont.

On March 12, 1772, what was left of Albany County was split into three parts, one remaining under the name Albany County. The other two were called Tryon County (later renamed Montgomery County) and Charlotte County (later renamed Washington County).

Tryon County contained the western portion (and, since no western boundary was specified, theoretically extended west to the Pacific). The eastern boundary of Tryon County was approximately five miles west of the present city of Schenectady, and the county included the western part of the Adirondack Mountains and the area west of the West Branch of the Delaware River. The area then designated as Tryon County included what are now 37 counties of New York State. The county was named for William Tryon, colonial governor of New York. Charlotte County contained the eastern portion of Albany County.

In 1784, following the peace treaty that ended the American Revolutionary War, the name "Charlotte County" was changed to Washington County to honor George Washington, the American Revolutionary War general and later President of the United States. Tryon County was changed to Montgomery County to honor the general, Richard Montgomery, who had captured several places in Canada and died trying to capture the city of Quebec. It replaced the name of the British governor, hated by the rebels.

In 1788, Clinton County was split off from Washington County. This was a much larger area than the present Clinton County, including part of what would later become St. Lawrence County, as well as several other counties or county parts of the present New York State.

In 1789, the size of Montgomery County was reduced by the splitting off of Ontario County from Montgomery. The actual area split off from Montgomery County was much larger than the present county, also including the present Allegany, Cattaraugus, Chautauqua, Erie, Genesee, Livingston, Monroe, Niagara, Orleans, Steuben, Wyoming, Yates, and part of Schuyler and Wayne Counties.

St. Lawrence County is part of Macomb's Purchase of 1791.

In 1791, Herkimer County was one of three counties split off from Montgomery (the other two being Otsego, and Tioga County). This was much larger than the present county, however, and was reduced by a number of subsequent splits. The first was the splitting off in 1794 of Onondaga County. This county was larger than the current Onondaga County, including the present Cayuga, Cortland, and part of Oswego Counties. This was followed by the splitting off in 1798 from Herkimer County of two portions: one, Oneida County, was larger than the current Oneida County, including the present Jefferson, Lewis, and part of Oswego Counties; another portion, together with a portion of Tioga County, was taken to form Chenango County.

In 1799, Clinton County was reduced in size by the splitting off of Essex County from Clinton County.

In 1802, parts of Clinton, Herkimer, and Montgomery counties were taken to form the new St. Lawrence County. At that time Ogdensburg was the county seat. In 1828 the county seat was moved to Canton. The selection of Canton as the county seat was a compromise by the state legislature to end competition between factions supporting Ogdensburg and Potsdam for the county seat.

=== Earthquake ===
On September 5, 1944, a 5.8 magnitude earthquake centered in Massena struck the county. The earthquake was felt from Canada to Maryland, and from Maine to Indiana. The earthquake was the strongest earthquake in New York State history.

== Geography ==
According to the United States Census Bureau, the county has a total area of 2,821 square miles (7,310 km^{2}), of which 2,680 square miles (6,900 km^{2}) is land and 141 square miles (370 km^{2}) (5.0%) is water.

It is the largest county by area in the state of New York. It is larger than either of the states of Rhode Island (1544.9 square miles) or the state of Delaware (2488.72 square miles). St. Lawrence County is part of the North Country region.

Part of the county is in the Adirondack Park. It includes much of the Oswegatchie River, Cranberry Lake and Lake Ozonia.

The Port of Ogdensburg in St. Lawrence County is the only U.S. port on the St. Lawrence Seaway. This waterway allows ships and vessels to pass through the St. Lawrence River and on to the Great Lakes. Ogdensburg Harbor Light is listed in the National Register of Historic Places, and in the National Register of Historic Places listings in St. Lawrence County, New York

=== Adjacent counties ===
- Stormont, Dundas and Glengarry United Counties, Ontario, Canada – north
- Leeds and Grenville United Counties, Ontario, Canada – northwest
- Franklin County – east
- Herkimer County – south
- Hamilton County – south
- Lewis County – southwest
- Jefferson County – west

== Demographics ==
Historical population
| Census | Pop. | Note | %± |
|---|---|---|---|
| 1810 | 7,885 | | — |
| 1820 | 16,037 | | 103.4% |
| 1830 | 36,354 | | 126.7% |
| 1840 | 56,706 | | 56.0% |
| 1850 | 68,617 | | 21.0% |
| 1860 | 83,689 | | 22.0% |
| 1870 | 84,826 | | 1.4% |
| 1880 | 85,997 | | 1.4% |
| 1890 | 85,048 | | −1.1% |
| 1900 | 89,083 | | 4.7% |
| 1910 | 89,005 | | −0.1% |
| 1920 | 88,121 | | −1.0% |
| 1930 | 90,960 | | 3.2% |
| 1940 | 91,098 | | 0.2% |
| 1950 | 98,897 | | 8.6% |
| 1960 | 111,239 | | 12.5% |
| 1970 | 111,991 | | 0.7% |
| 1980 | 114,254 | | 2.0% |
| 1990 | 111,974 | | −2.0% |
| 2000 | 111,931 | | 0.0% |
| 2010 | 111,944 | | 0.0% |
| 2020 | 108,505 | | −3.1% |
| 2025 (est.) | 105,488 | ▼ | −2.8% |
U.S. Decennial Census; 1790–1960 1900–1990; 1990–2000 2010–2020

=== 2020 census ===
St. Lawrence County, New York – Racial and ethnic composition Note: the US Census treats Hispanic/Latino as an ethnic category. This table excludes Latinos from the racial categories and assigns them to a separate category. Hispanics/Latinos may be of any race.
| Race / Ethnicity (NH = Non-Hispanic) | Pop 1980 | Pop 1990 | Pop 2000 | Pop 2010 | Pop 2020 | % 1980 | % 1990 | % 2000 | % 2010 | % 2020 |
|---|---|---|---|---|---|---|---|---|---|---|
| White alone (NH) | 112,490 | 107,708 | 104,777 | 103,943 | 96,556 | 98.46% | 96.19% | 93.61% | 92.85% | 88.99% |
| Black or African American alone (NH) | 219 | 1,364 | 2,531 | 2,259 | 2,788 | 0.19% | 1.22% | 2.26% | 2.02% | 2.57% |
| Native American or Alaska Native alone (NH) | 443 | 811 | 927 | 1,051 | 1,143 | 0.39% | 0.72% | 0.83% | 0.94% | 1.05% |
| Asian alone (NH) | 395 | 789 | 793 | 1,074 | 1,089 | 0.35% | 0.70% | 0.71% | 0.96% | 1.00% |
| Native Hawaiian or Pacific Islander alone (NH) | x | x | 32 | 26 | 19 | x | x | 0.03% | 0.02% | 0.02% |
| Other race alone (NH) | 145 | 27 | 70 | 111 | 298 | 0.13% | 0.02% | 0.06% | 0.10% | 0.27% |
| Mixed race or Multiracial (NH) | x | x | 793 | 1,334 | 3,780 | x | x | 0.71% | 1.19% | 3.48% |
| Hispanic or Latino (any race) | 562 | 1,275 | 2,008 | 2,146 | 2,832 | 0.49% | 1.14% | 1.79% | 1.92% | 2.61% |
| Total | 114,254 | 111,974 | 111,931 | 111,944 | 108,505 | 100.00% | 100.00% | 100.00% | 100.00% | 100.00% |

=== 2000 census ===
As of the census of 2000, there were 113,931 people, 40,506 households, and 26,936 families residing in the county. The population density was 42 inhabitants per square mile (16/km^{2}). There were 49,721 housing units at an average density of 18 units per square mile (6.9/km^{2}). The racial makeup of the county was 94.51% White, 2.38% African American, 0.87% Native American, 0.71% Asian, 0.03% Pacific Islander, 0.69% from other races, and 0.51% from two or more races. Hispanic or Latino of any race were 1.79% of the population. 16.9% were of French, 16.1% Irish, 13.9% American, 11.6% English, 8.1% French Canadian, 7.9% German and 7.6% Italian ancestry according to Census 2000. 95.6% spoke only English, while 3.2% spoke French and 1.2% Spanish at home.

There were 40,506 households, out of which 31.80% had children under the age of 18 living with them, 51.50% were married couples living together, 10.30% had a female householder with no husband present, and 33.50% were non-families. 26.50% of all households were made up of individuals, and 11.20% had someone living alone who was 65 years of age or older. The average household size was 2.49 and the average family size was 2.99.

In the county, the population was spread out, with 23.40% under the age of 18, 13.80% from 18 to 24, 27.40% from 25 to 44, 22.40% from 45 to 64, and 13.00% who were 65 years of age or older. The median age was 35 years. For every 100 females there were 103.30 males. For every 100 females age 18 and over, there were 102.10 males.

The median income for a household in the county was $30,356, and the median income for a family was $34,510. Males had a median income of $30,135 versus $24,253 for females. The per capita income for the county was $14,728. About 12.30% of families and 19.90% of the population were below the poverty line, including 21.30% of those under age 18 and 10.30% of those age 65 or over.

== Education ==
=== School districts ===
There are 17 school districts with territory in St. Lawrence County. 17 of those centered in the county are under the jurisdiction of the St. Lawrence-Lewis BOCES Supervisory District along with Harrisville Central School District in Lewis County, New York.

- Brasher Falls Central School District: St. Lawrence Central School, Brasher Falls
- Canton Central School District: Hugh Williams Senior High School, Canton
- Clifton-Fine Central School District: Clifton-Fine Central School, Star Lake
- Colton-Pierrepont Central School District: Colton-Pierrepont Central School, Colton
- Edwards-Knox Central School District: Edwards-Knox Central School, Russell
- Gouverneur Central School District: Gouverneur Junior/Senior High School, Gouverneur
- Hammond Central School District: Hammond Central School, Hammond
- Hermon-Dekalb Central School District: Hermon-Dekalb Central School, Dekalb Junction
- Heuvelton Central School District: Heuvelton Central School, Heuvelton
- Lisbon Central School District: Lisbon Central School, Lisbon
- Madrid-Waddington Central School District: Madrid–Waddington Central School, Madrid
- Massena Central School District: Massena Central High School, Massena
- Morristown Central School District: Morristown Central School, Morristown
- Norwood-Norfolk Central School District: Norwood-Norfolk Central School, Norfolk
- Ogdensburg City School District: Ogdensburg Free Academy, Ogdensburg
- Parishville-Hopkinton Central School District: Parishville-Hopkinton Central School, Parishville
- Potsdam Central School District: Potsdam High School, Potsdam

Other school districts with territory in the county include:

- Alexandria Central School District
- Brushton-Moira Central School District
- Harrisville Central School District
- Indian River Central School District
- Salmon River Central School District
- St. Regis Falls Central School District
- Tupper Lake Central School District

All public high schools in St. Lawrence County compete in the New York State Public High School Athletic Association Section X Northern Athletic Conference.

=== Universities and colleges ===
Saint Lawrence County is home to St. Lawrence University, State University of New York at Potsdam, Clarkson University, the SUNY-ESF Ranger School, and the State University of New York at Canton.

== Politics and government ==
United States presidential election results for St. Lawrence County, New York
| Year | Republican | | Democratic | | Third party(ies) | |
| Year | No. | % | No. | % | No. | % |
|---|---|---|---|---|---|---|
| 1884 | 13,441 | 67.86% | 6,035 | 30.47% | 331 | 1.67% |
| 1888 | 14,611 | 67.56% | 6,509 | 30.10% | 508 | 2.35% |
| 1892 | 13,177 | 64.17% | 6,156 | 29.98% | 1,202 | 5.85% |
| 1896 | 15,287 | 70.97% | 5,749 | 26.69% | 505 | 2.34% |
| 1900 | 15,296 | 71.02% | 5,699 | 26.46% | 544 | 2.53% |
| 1904 | 15,274 | 70.43% | 5,798 | 26.74% | 614 | 2.83% |
| 1908 | 14,151 | 67.87% | 5,898 | 28.29% | 800 | 3.84% |
| 1912 | 8,404 | 44.98% | 5,329 | 28.52% | 4,952 | 26.50% |
| 1916 | 13,142 | 66.77% | 6,056 | 30.77% | 485 | 2.46% |
| 1920 | 24,651 | 75.60% | 7,213 | 22.12% | 742 | 2.28% |
| 1924 | 22,583 | 71.50% | 7,103 | 22.49% | 1,898 | 6.01% |
| 1928 | 25,804 | 66.23% | 12,567 | 32.26% | 589 | 1.51% |
| 1932 | 22,650 | 63.48% | 12,687 | 35.56% | 343 | 0.96% |
| 1936 | 26,031 | 65.81% | 12,763 | 32.27% | 762 | 1.93% |
| 1940 | 24,339 | 60.86% | 15,569 | 38.93% | 82 | 0.21% |
| 1944 | 21,919 | 58.89% | 15,223 | 40.90% | 77 | 0.21% |
| 1948 | 21,160 | 60.59% | 13,200 | 37.80% | 565 | 1.62% |
| 1952 | 28,036 | 68.27% | 13,000 | 31.65% | 32 | 0.08% |
| 1956 | 31,897 | 74.54% | 10,892 | 25.46% | 0 | 0.00% |
| 1960 | 25,848 | 57.06% | 19,430 | 42.89% | 24 | 0.05% |
| 1964 | 12,102 | 29.30% | 29,173 | 70.62% | 32 | 0.08% |
| 1968 | 20,982 | 55.31% | 15,662 | 41.29% | 1,289 | 3.40% |
| 1972 | 26,145 | 63.00% | 15,286 | 36.83% | 72 | 0.17% |
| 1976 | 22,249 | 55.71% | 17,503 | 43.83% | 182 | 0.46% |
| 1980 | 18,437 | 46.53% | 17,006 | 42.92% | 4,181 | 10.55% |
| 1984 | 26,062 | 61.83% | 15,963 | 37.87% | 124 | 0.29% |
| 1988 | 20,290 | 51.39% | 18,921 | 47.92% | 270 | 0.68% |
| 1992 | 13,901 | 32.85% | 18,197 | 43.00% | 10,219 | 24.15% |
| 1996 | 10,827 | 28.14% | 21,798 | 56.65% | 5,852 | 15.21% |
| 2000 | 16,449 | 41.34% | 21,386 | 53.75% | 1,951 | 4.90% |
| 2004 | 18,029 | 43.17% | 22,857 | 54.73% | 875 | 2.10% |
| 2008 | 16,956 | 41.03% | 23,706 | 57.36% | 664 | 1.61% |
| 2012 | 15,138 | 40.70% | 21,353 | 57.41% | 700 | 1.88% |
| 2016 | 19,942 | 50.93% | 16,488 | 42.11% | 2,728 | 6.97% |
| 2020 | 24,608 | 54.80% | 19,361 | 43.11% | 938 | 2.09% |
| 2024 | 25,919 | 58.68% | 18,010 | 40.78% | 239 | 0.54% |

Prior to the 1992 presidential election, St. Lawrence County was a traditionally Republican county, supporting the Democrats only in their sweep of New York State counties in 1964. From 1992 through the 2012 election, St. Lawrence County swung Democratic, posting double-digit victories for Democratic candidates, most notably in 1996 when Bill Clinton won the county by 28-point margin over Bob Dole. The first Republican victory in the county since 1988 came in 2016 when Donald Trump carried the county by an eight-point margin. In 2020, it was one of only a few counties in Upstate New York where Trump improved his margin, this time carrying it by over 10 points. Trump improved on his margin again in 2024, this time performing better than any candidate from any political party since 1984.

The county is governed by a fifteen person board of legislators which oversees the county departments, drafts policies, and sets an annual budget. They serve four year terms, with the last election being in 2022. They appoint an administrator to carry out their policies. Other elected officials include a clerk, a district attorney, four coroners, a sheriff, and a treasurer.

St. Lawrence County Legislators as of October 2025
| District | Legislator | Party | First elected | Communities represented |
|---|---|---|---|---|
| 1 | James E. Reagen | R | 2018 | Ogdensburg (part) |
| 2 | David Forsythe | R | 2006, 2014 (Note: Forsythe was originally elected in 2006, then unsuccessfully ran for the State Assembly in 2010. He was re-elected to his seat on the county board in 2014.) | Lisbon, Ogdensburg (part) |
| 3 | Joseph Lightfoot | R | 2010 | Canton (part, including Rensselaer Falls Village and Morley Hamlet (part)), Morristown (including hamlet), Oswegatchie (including Heuvelton Village) |
| 4 | William J. Sheridan | R | 2018 | Edwards (including hamlet), Fowler (including Hailesboro Hamlet), Hammond (including village), Macomb, Pitcairn, Rossie |
| 5 | Harry A. Smithers II | R | 2022 | De Peyster, Gouverneur (including village) |
| 6 | Larry Denesha | R | 2014 | Clare, Clifton (including Cranberry Lake Hamlet), De Kalb (including De Kalb Junction and Richville Village), Fine (including Star Lake and Wanakena hamlets), Hermon (including hamlet), Russell |
| 7 | Rick Perkins | R (Note: Perkins was elected as a Democrat in 2014 and 2018 before running as a Republican in 2022.) | 2014 | Colton (including Colton and South Colton hamlets), Hopkinton, Parishville (including hamlet), Piercefield, Pierrepont (including Crary Mills (part) and Hannawa Falls hamlets) |
| 8 | Benjamin Hull | R | 2022 | Canton (part, including Crary Mills (part), Morley (part) and Pyrites hamlets), Madrid (including hamlet), Potsdam (part, including Crary Mills Hamlet (part)) |
| 9 | Anthony Levato | R | 2025 (Note: Appointed on October 27th to fill a seat vacated by the death of previous legislator Daniel Fay) | Canton (part, including village) |
| 10 | Margaret I. Haggard | D | 2022 | Potsdam Village (part) |
| 11 | Glenn J. Webster | R | 2022 | Potsdam (part, including village (part)), Stockholm (including Winthrop Hamlet) |
| 12 | John Burke | R | 2014 | Norfolk (including hamlet), Potsdam (part, including Norwood Village) |
| 13 | John Gennett | R | 2022 | Brasher (including Brasher Falls and Helena hamlets), Lawrence, Massena (part, including Massena Village (part) and Massena Center and Rooseveltown hamlets) |
| 14 | Nicole Terminelli | D | 2018 | Massena Village (part) |
| 15 | Rita Curran | R | 2018 | Louisville, Massena Village (part), Waddington (including village) |

== Media ==
=== Radio ===
- 1340 WMSA, Massena
- WVLF-FM Mix 96.1
- WRCD-FM 101.5 The Fox
- WSNN (99.3, Potsdam)
- WPDM (1470, Potsdam)
- WSLU (89.5, Canton)

== Transportation ==
=== Airports ===
The following public use airports are located in the county:

- Massena International Airport (MSS) – Massena
- Ogdensburg International Airport (OGS) – Ogdensburg
- Potsdam Municipal Airport (PTD) – Potsdam
- Moores Airport (1E8) – Degrasse

== Communities ==
=== Larger settlements ===
| # | Location | Population | Type | Area |
|---|---|---|---|---|
| 1 | ‡Akwasasne | 12,000 | CDP/Reservation | Riverside |
| 2 | Massena | 10,883 | Village | Riverside |
| 3 | Ogdensburg | 10,436 | City | Riverside |
| 4 | Potsdam | 9,428 | Village | East |
| 5 | †Canton | 6,314 | Village | Center |
| 6 | Gouverneur | 3,949 | Village | Riverside |
| 7 | Norwood | 1,560 | Village | Riverside |
| 8 | Norfolk | 1,327 | CDP | Riverside |
| 9 | Hannawa Falls | 1,042 | CDP | East |
| 10 | Waddington | 972 | Village | Riverside |
| 11 | Star Lake | 809 | CDP | South |
| 12 | Madrid | 757 | CDP | Riverside |
| 13 | Heuvelton | 714 | Village | Riverside |
| 14 | Brasher Falls | 669 | CDP | East |
| 15 | Parishville | 647 | CDP | East |
| 16 | Hailesboro | 624 | CDP | South |
| 17 | DeKalb Junction | 519 | CDP | East |
| 18 | Winthrop | 510 | CDP | East |
| 19 | Edwards | 439 | CDP | South |
| 20 | Hermon | 422 | CDP | Center |
| 21 | Morristown | 395 | CDP | Riverside |
| 22 | Colton | 345 | CDP | East |
| 23 | Rensselaer Falls | 332 | Village | Riverside |
| 24 | Richville | 323 | Village | South |
| 25 | Hammond | 280 | Village | Riverside |
| 26 | Cranberry Lake | 200 | CDP | Southeast |

† - County Seat

‡ - Not Wholly in this County

=== Towns ===
- Brasher
- Canton
- Clare
- Clifton
- Colton
- De Kalb
- De Peyster
- Edwards
- Fine
- Fowler
- Gouverneur
- Hammond
- Hermon
- Hopkinton
- Lawrence
- Lisbon
- Louisville
- Macomb
- Madrid
- Massena
- Morristown
- Norfolk
- Oswegatchie
- Parishville
- Piercefield
- Pierrepont
- Pitcairn
- Potsdam
- Rossie
- Russell
- Stockholm
- Waddington

=== Hamlets ===
- Balmat
- Conifer
- Crary Mills
- Helena
- Massena Center
- Morley
- Newton Falls
- Pyrites
- Rooseveltown
- South Colton
- Wanakena
- Chase Mills

== See also ==
- List of counties in New York
- National Register of Historic Places listings in St. Lawrence County, New York
- St. Lawrence County Public Transportation
