= Colton, New York =

- Town
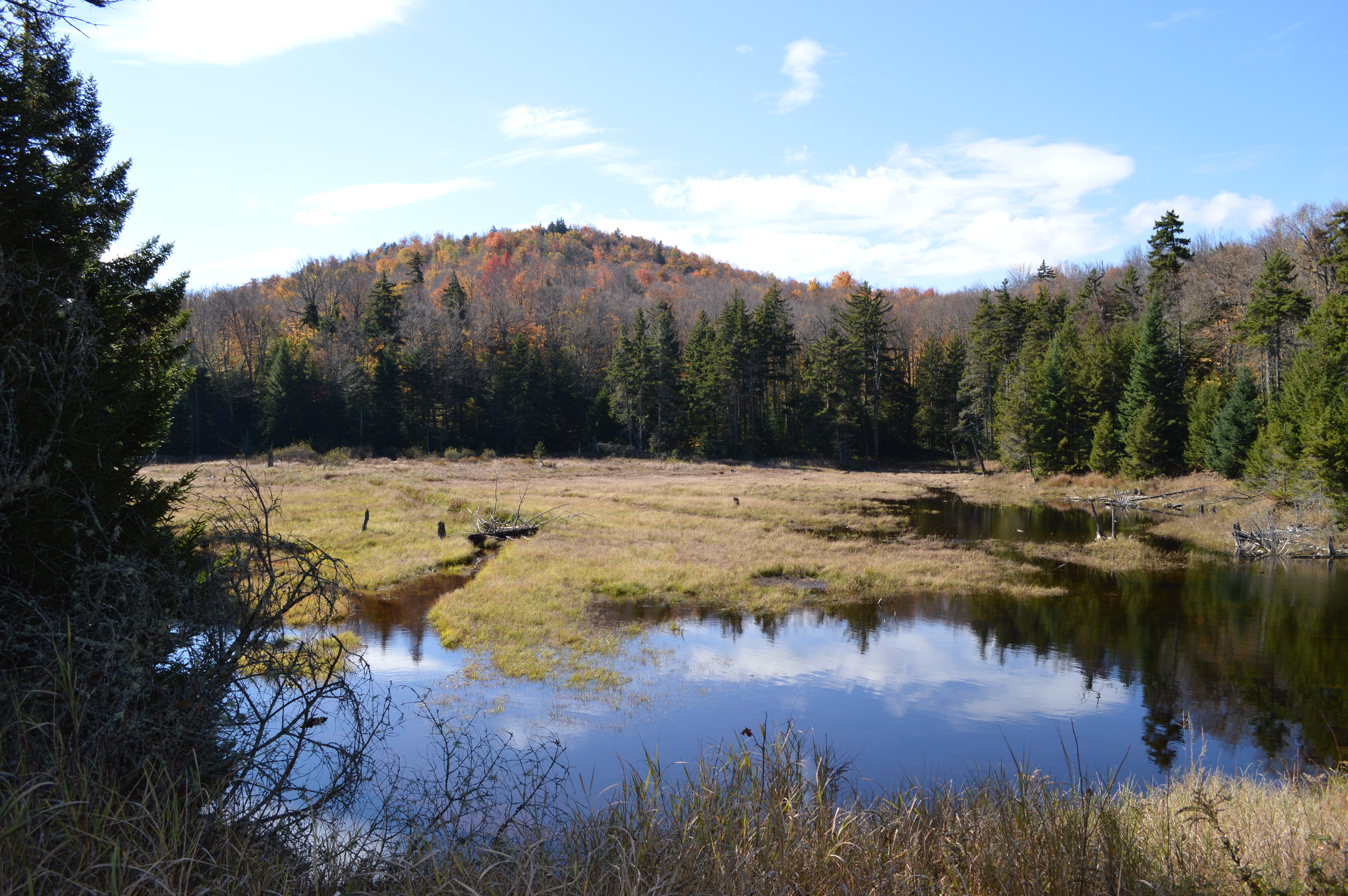
- Landscape in Colton

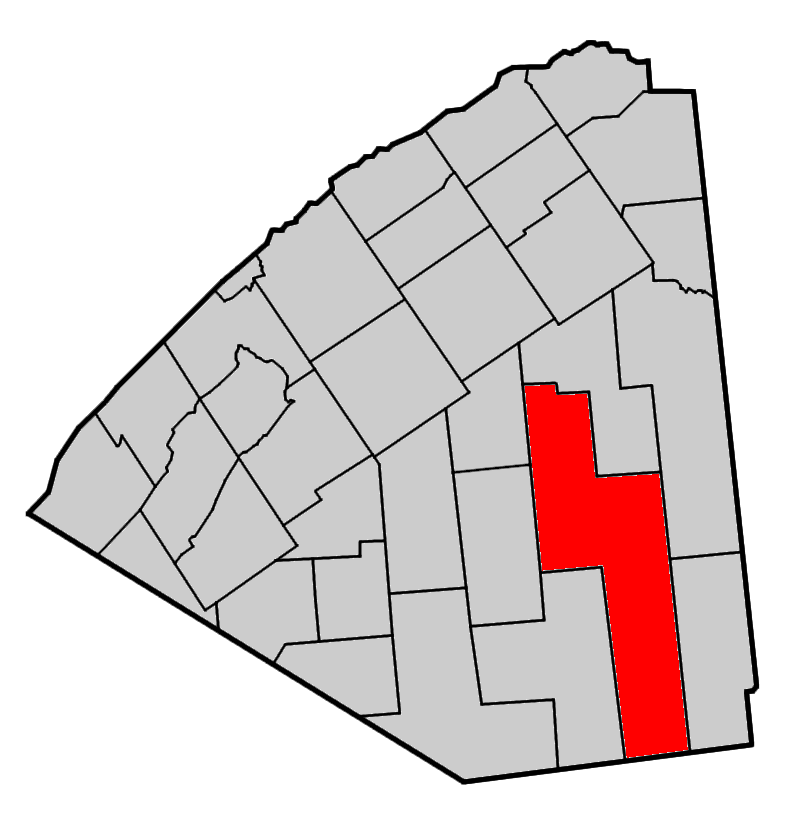
- Map highlighting Colton's location within St. Lawrence County.

- Location within the state of New York
- Coordinates: 44°28′38″N 74°51′17″W
- Country: United States
- State: New York
- County: St. Lawrence

Area
  - Total: 254.95 sq mi (660.33 km^{2})
  - Land: 241.70 sq mi (626.00 km^{2})
  - Water: 13.25 sq mi (34.32 km^{2})
- Elevation: 1,496 ft (456 m)

Population (2020)
  - Total: 1,530
  - Density: 5.9/sq mi (2.29/km^{2})
- Time zone: UTC-5 (Eastern (EST))
  - Summer (DST): UTC-4 (EDT)
- FIPS code: 36-17409
- GNIS feature ID: 0978854

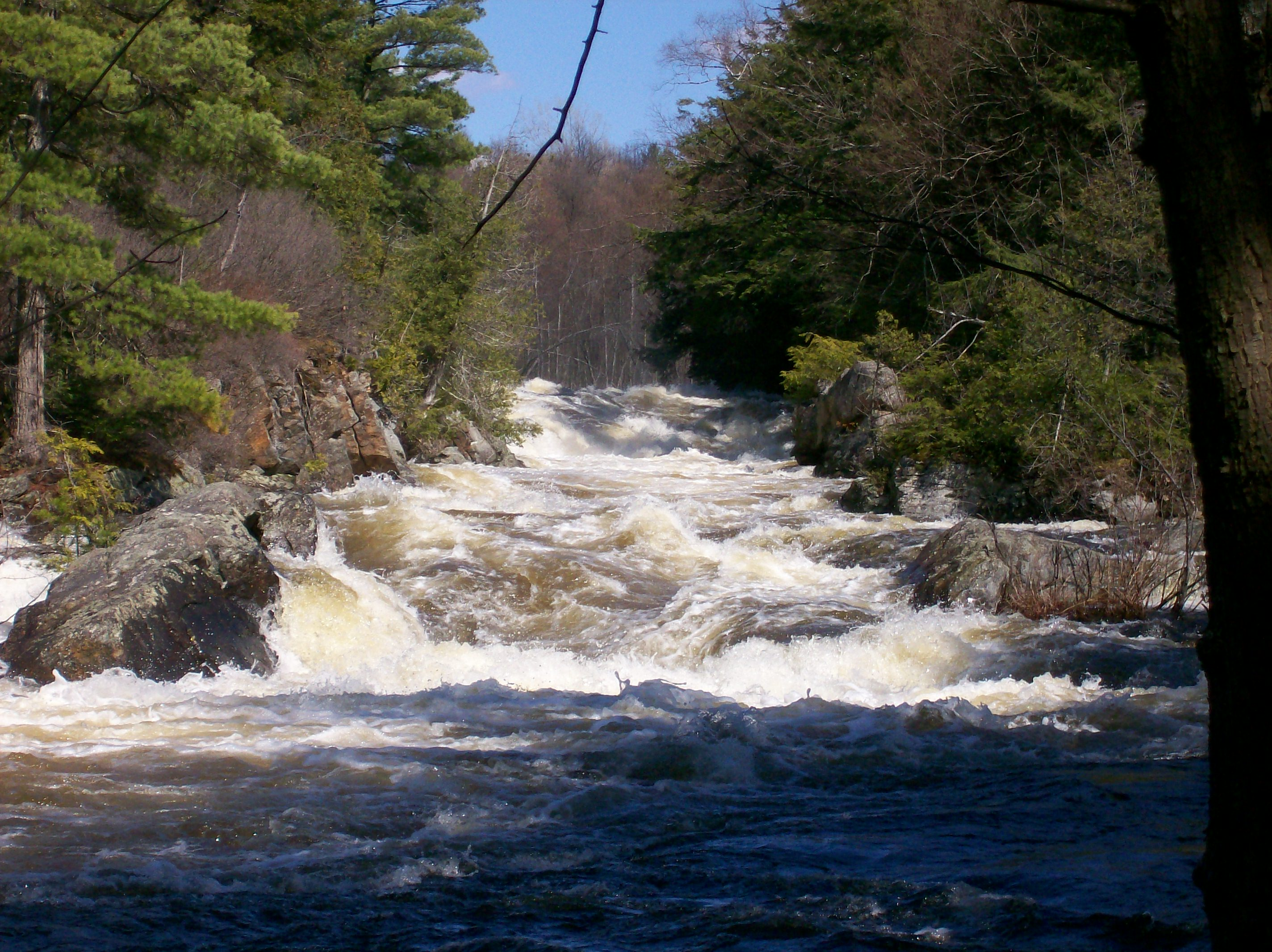
The Raquette River in the Stone Valley Recreational Area

Colton is a town in St. Lawrence County, New York, United States. The population was 1,451 at the 2010 census. The town, originally named "Matildaville", is named after early settler Jesse Colton Higley.

Colton is in the southeastern part of the county, south of Potsdam.

== History ==
The first land patents were issued in 1776. The first settlement took place in March 1824 near Colton village, in the northern part of the town, by Abel Brown and his son, James Brown. Saw mills were established on the Raquette River, in addition to a starch factory built in 1844.

Colton was organized in 1843 from part of the town of Parishville. Additional land from Parishville was added to Colton in 1851, and Colton was increased in 1876 from territory taken from the town of Hopkinton.

The Zion Episcopal Church and Rectory was listed on the National Register of Historic Places in 2003. The Hepburn Library of Colton was added in 2012.

== Education ==
Colton has one school district, Colton-Pierrepont Central School. The school had 390 students in 2022.

== Geography ==
According to the United States Census Bureau, the town has a total area of 254.9 square miles (660 km^{2}), of which 242.1 square miles (627 km^{2}) is land and 12.8 square miles (33 km^{2}) (5.04%) is water.

Colton is the largest town in St. Lawrence County, which in turn is the largest county in New York state. The southern town line is the border of Hamilton and Herkimer counties.

The Raquette River flows through the western part of the town. The town is in the foothills of the Adirondack Mountains. Most of the town, the southern part, is inside the Adirondack Park.

New York State Route 56 intersects New York State Route 68 at Colton village. New York State Route 3 intersects NY-56 in the east-central part of the town at Sevey Corners.

=== Climate ===
Climate data for Colton 2 N, New York, 1991–2020 normals, 1936-2020 extremes: 580ft (177m)
Month	Jan	Feb	Mar	Apr	May	Jun	Jul	Aug	Sep	Oct	Nov	Dec	Year
Record high °F (°C)	62 (17)	65 (18)	81 (27)	88 (31)	93 (34)	101 (38)	101 (38)	102 (39)	90 (32)	81 (27)	72 (22)	67 (19)	102 (39)
Mean daily maximum °F (°C)	25.9 (−3.4)	28.5 (−1.9)	37.5 (3.1)	52.6 (11.4)	66.8 (19.3)	75.4 (24.1)	79.7 (26.5)	78.3 (25.7)	70.7 (21.5)	57.0 (13.9)	43.9 (6.6)	32.0 (0.0)	54.0 (12.2)
Daily mean °F (°C)	16.0 (−8.9)	18.6 (−7.4)	27.8 (−2.3)	42.1 (5.6)	55.4 (13.0)	64.7 (18.2)	69.0 (20.6)	67.5 (19.7)	59.5 (15.3)	47.6 (8.7)	35.6 (2.0)	23.8 (−4.6)	44.0 (6.7)
Mean daily minimum °F (°C)	6.1 (−14.4)	8.6 (−13.0)	18.0 (−7.8)	31.5 (−0.3)	43.9 (6.6)	53.9 (12.2)	58.2 (14.6)	56.6 (13.7)	48.2 (9.0)	38.1 (3.4)	27.3 (−2.6)	15.6 (−9.1)	33.8 (1.0)
Record low °F (°C)	−27 (−33)	−36 (−38)	−15 (−26)	7 (−14)	25 (−4)	36 (2)	44 (7)	42 (6)	29 (−2)	19 (−7)	−5 (−21)	−24 (−31)	−36 (−38)
Average precipitation inches (mm)	2.69 (68)	2.35 (60)	2.78 (71)	3.56 (90)	3.57 (91)	4.02 (102)	4.32 (110)	3.66 (93)	4.07 (103)	4.57 (116)	3.37 (86)	3.07 (78)	42.03 (1,068)
Average snowfall inches (cm)	27.2 (69)	28.9 (73)	16.1 (41)	3.4 (8.6)	0.2 (0.51)	0.0 (0.0)	0.0 (0.0)	0.0 (0.0)	0.0 (0.0)	0.1 (0.25)	9.8 (25)	22.0 (56)	107.7 (273.36)
Source 1: NOAA (Hannawa Falls 0.1 SW Snowfall)
Source 2: XMACIS2 (2009-2020 snowfall, records & monthly max/mins)

== Demographics ==
Historical population
Census	Pop.	Note	%±
1850	506		—
1860	1,400		176.7%
1870	1,719		22.8%
1880	1,974		14.8%
1890	1,843		−6.6%
1900	1,678		−9.0%
1910	1,499		−10.7%
1920	1,299		−13.3%
1930	986		−24.1%
1940	1,096		11.2%
1950	960		−12.4%
1960	1,195		24.5%
1970	1,249		4.5%
1980	1,292		3.4%
1990	1,274		−1.4%
2000	1,453		14.1%
2010	1,451		−0.1%
2020	1,530		5.4%

As of the census of 2000, there were 1,453 people, 604 households, and 405 families residing in the town. The population density was 6.0 inhabitants per square mile (2.3/km^{2}). There were 1,163 housing units at an average density of 4.8 per square mile (1.9/km^{2}). The racial makeup of the town was 99.17% White, 0.34% Native American, 0.07% Asian, and 0.41% from two or more races. Hispanic or Latino of any race were 0.89% of the population.

There were 604 households, out of which 25.2% had children under the age of 18 living with them, 55.6% were married couples living together, 6.1% had a female householder with no husband present, and 32.8% were non-families. 26.0% of all households were made up of individuals, and 10.3% had someone living alone who was 65 years of age or older. The average household size was 2.40 and the average family size was 2.90.

In the town, the population was spread out, with 22.6% under the age of 18, 6.3% from 18 to 24, 24.8% from 25 to 44, 30.0% from 45 to 64, and 16.2% who were 65 years of age or older. The median age was 42 years. For every 100 females, there were 102.4 males. For every 100 females age 18 and over, there were 101.8 males.

The median income for a household in the town was $38,875, and the median income for a family was $44,637. Males had a median income of $35,000 versus $22,443 for females. The per capita income for the town was $20,528. About 10.5% of families and 14.7% of the population were below the poverty line, including 22.5% of those under age 18 and 6.5% of those age 65 or over.

== Notable people ==
- A. Barton Hepburn (1846–1922), banker, politician, and philanthropist
- Bertrand H. Snell, former US Congressman

== Communities and locations in Colton ==
- Barber Point – A location on the eastern shore of Cranberry Lake.
- Brandy Brook – A location in the southwestern part of the town on New York State Route 3.
- Burntbridge Pond – A pond located southwest of Massawepie Lake.
- Carry Falls Reservoir – A reservoir in the northeastern part of Colton.
- Church Pond – A lake located south of Stark. It is the source of the North Branch Grass River.
- Colton – The hamlet of Colton is located at the junction of NY-56 and NY-68 by the Raquette River. The community, in the northwestern part of the town, is the location of the first settlement.
- Colton Flow – A part of the Raquette River located south of Colton.
- Cranberry Lake – A large lake near the southwestern town line, but only a small part of the lake is in Colton.
- Granshue Club – A location south of Stark near the western town line.
- Higley Flow State Park – A state park west of South Colton.
- Hitchens Pond – A lake located on the eastern town line.
- Irish Settlement – A hamlet near the town center on NY-56.
- Leonard Pond – A pond north of Sevey.
- Little Trout Pond – A pond located in the southwestern corner of the town, which is partially in the town of Piercefield.
- Lows Lake – A lake partly in the southwestern corner of Colton.
- Sevey – A hamlet in the central part of the town on NY-56
- Sevey Corners – A location in the east-central part of the town on NY-3, south of Sevey.
- Shurteff – A hamlet southwest of Sevey on NY-3.
- South Colton – A hamlet in the northern part of the Town, south of the hamlet of Colton on NY-56. Sunday Rock was listed on the National Register of Historic Places in 2010.
- South Colton Reservoir – A reservoir located northeast of South Colton.
- Stark – A hamlet by the town line in the eastern part of Colton.
- Stark Falls Reservoir – A reservoir south of Stark and north of Carry Falls Reservoir.
- Stone Valley Recreational Area - A hiking and fishing area along the Raquette River, north of the hamlet of Colton.
