= List of snowmobile trails in New York =

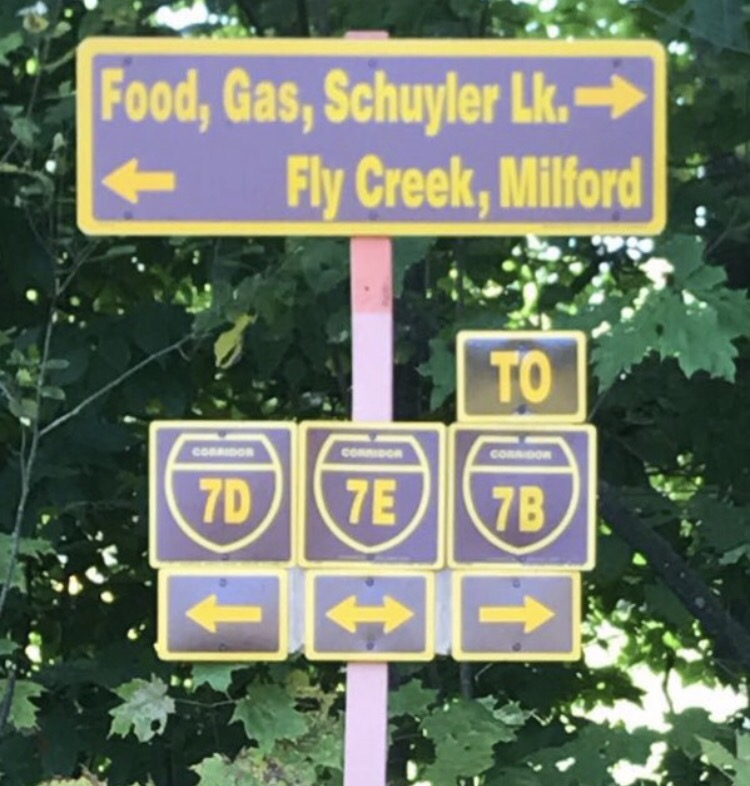
Corridor trail signs at the northern end of Corridor 7D and Corridor 7E concurrency

The State Snowmobile Trail System in New York State has over 10,500 miles (16,900 km) of snowmobile trails that stretch from one end of the state to the other, crossing both public and private land. The trail system is administered by the New York State Office of Parks, Recreation and Historic Preservation (NYS OPRHP) and is maintained by snowmobile clubs which are funded by a portion of snowmobile registration fees. Most of the clubs are members of the New York State Snowmobile Association. Snowmobiling conservatively generates $868 million per year for the New York State economy.

== Corridor trails ==
Of the over 10,500 miles (16,900 km) in the New York State snowmobile trail system, about 8,000 miles (13,000 km) are corridor trails. Corridor trails are high-volume primary routes that provide access to high-use areas and large concentrations of snowmobiles. Some corridor trails run concurrently on occasion and some corridor route numbers are reused in different areas of the state. They are funded by the state.

Route	Length (mi)	Length (km)	From	To	Notes
Corridor 2			Corridor 1A by Cherry Creek	Corridor 7B by Franklin	Main cross-state trail along the Southern Tier
Corridor 3			Corridor 1 by Randolph	Dead-end by West Henrietta	
Corridor 4 (western segment)			Pennsylvania border by French Creek	Corridor 3 east of Perry	
Corridor 4 (middle segment)			Corridor 3 by Atlanta	Dead-end by Port Gibson	
Corridor 4 (eastern segment)			Secondary 43A by Marion	Stony Creek	
Corridor 5			Corridor 2 by Whitney Point Reservoir	Corridor 8 south of Diana	Runs concurrently with Corridor 4 from Fulton to Central Square
Corridor 5A (Altmar)			Corridor 5 by Altmar	Corridor 8B by Greig	Main trail through Tug Hill region, Re-crosses Corridor 5 south of Pinckney
Corridor 7			Corridor 2 by Smithville	Dead-end at NY 122 by Constable	Main north-south route
Corridor 7A (#1)			Corridor 7 (via Secondary 77) by Waterville	Corridor 7 by Steuben	Main alternate route of Corridor 7
Corridor 7A (#2)	8.62	13.87	Corridor 7E/Corridor 7B by Exeter	Corridor 7B by Richfield	Not connected to Corridor 7A (#1)
Corridor 7B	102.41	164.81	Corridor 2A by Delhi	Corridor 7A by Litchfield	
Corridor 7C	72.12	116.07	Corridor 7A by Litchfield	Secondary 73 by Summit	Runs concurrently with Corridor 7D by Warren
Corridor 7D	107.93	173.70	Corridor 7B by Laurens	Corridor 8B by Perth	Serves Canadarago Lake
Corridor 7E	58.51	94.16	Corridor 7J by Leonardsville	Corridor 7C by Pleasant Brook	Runs concurrently with Corridor 7D from Schuyler Lake to Index
Corridor 7E (#2)	45.01	72.44	Corridor 8 east of Parishville	Canadian border by Dundee, Quebec	
Corridor 7J	18.17	29.24	Corridor 7 by Brookfield	Corridor 7A by Cassville	
Corridor 7P	49.88	80.27	Continues as Secondary 79 by Little Falls	Dead-end in Amsterdam	Most of the route follows the bike path along the Erie Canal
Corridor 8			Secondary 80 by Mayfield	Corridor 8C by Mooers, New York	Main north-south trail through the Adirondack Park
Corridor 8A	56.57	91.04	Corridor 4A by Fairfield	Corridor 8 by Sheriff Lake	Runs concurrent with Corridor 8 by Pleasant Lake
Corridor 8A (#2)	29.4	47.3	Corridor 7 southeast of Owls Head	Dead end in Dannemora	Secondary 86 spurs off 8A and serves Saranac
Corridor 8C	16.18	26.04	Corridor 4/Corridor 4A by Salisbury	Corridor 8A northeast of Oppenheim	
Corridor 8C (#2)	58.06	93.44	Corridor 7 by Malone	Canadian Border by Champlain	
Corridor 8D	26.36	42.42	Corridor 8 by Pleasant Lake	Corridor 8 by Stark Falls Reservoir	Main alternate route of Corridor 8
Corridor 8E	12.94	20.82	Corridor 8A by Oppenheim	Corridor 7D by Ephratah	
Corridor 8E (#2)	12.99	20.91	Corridor 8 east of Ornsbee Pond	Secondary 86A in South Colton	
Corridor 8F	20.06	32.28	Corridor 8A by Lyon Mountain	Corridor 8C (#2) by Ellenburg Depot	

== Secondary trails ==
Secondary trails are medium-volume routes that connect local attractions and high concentrations of snowmobiles to corridor trails. They are funded by the state.

== Local trails ==
Local trails are low to medium and sometimes high volume routes that connect local attractions and snowmobilers to secondary and corridor trails. They are funded by the local clubs.

== Trail system expansion ==
The Empire State Trail that will be completed by 2020 will allow snowmobiling on portions of the trail, allowing the New York State Snowmobile Trail System to add trails.

== Trail problems ==
At times some trails have to be altered due to private property being sold or due to snowmobilers damaging private property.

- A trail in the town of Redfield in Oswego County and the town of Worth in Jefferson County was closed in the 2017-2018 season due to a dispute between the property owner and local officials.
