= New York State Route 310 =

State highway in St. Lawrence County, New York, US

New York State Route 310
- NY 310 highlighted in red

Route information
- Maintained by NYSDOT
- Length: 21.43 mi (34.49 km)
- Existed: September 1, 1982–present

Major junctions
- South end: US 11 / NY 68 near Canton
- North end: NY 56 in Norfolk

Location
- Country: United States
- State: New York
- Counties: St. Lawrence

Highway system
- New York Highways; Interstate; US; State; Reference; Parkways
| ← NY 309 | → NY 311 |
| ← NY 56 | NY 56A | → NY 57 |

New York State Route 310 (NY 310) is a 21.43-mile-long (34.49 km) north–south state highway located entirely within St. Lawrence County in the North Country of the U.S. state of New York. The southern terminus is at U.S. Route 11 (US 11) and NY 68 in the town of Canton, just east of the village of Canton. The northern terminus is at NY 56 in the community of Raymondville in the town of Norfolk.

== Route description ==
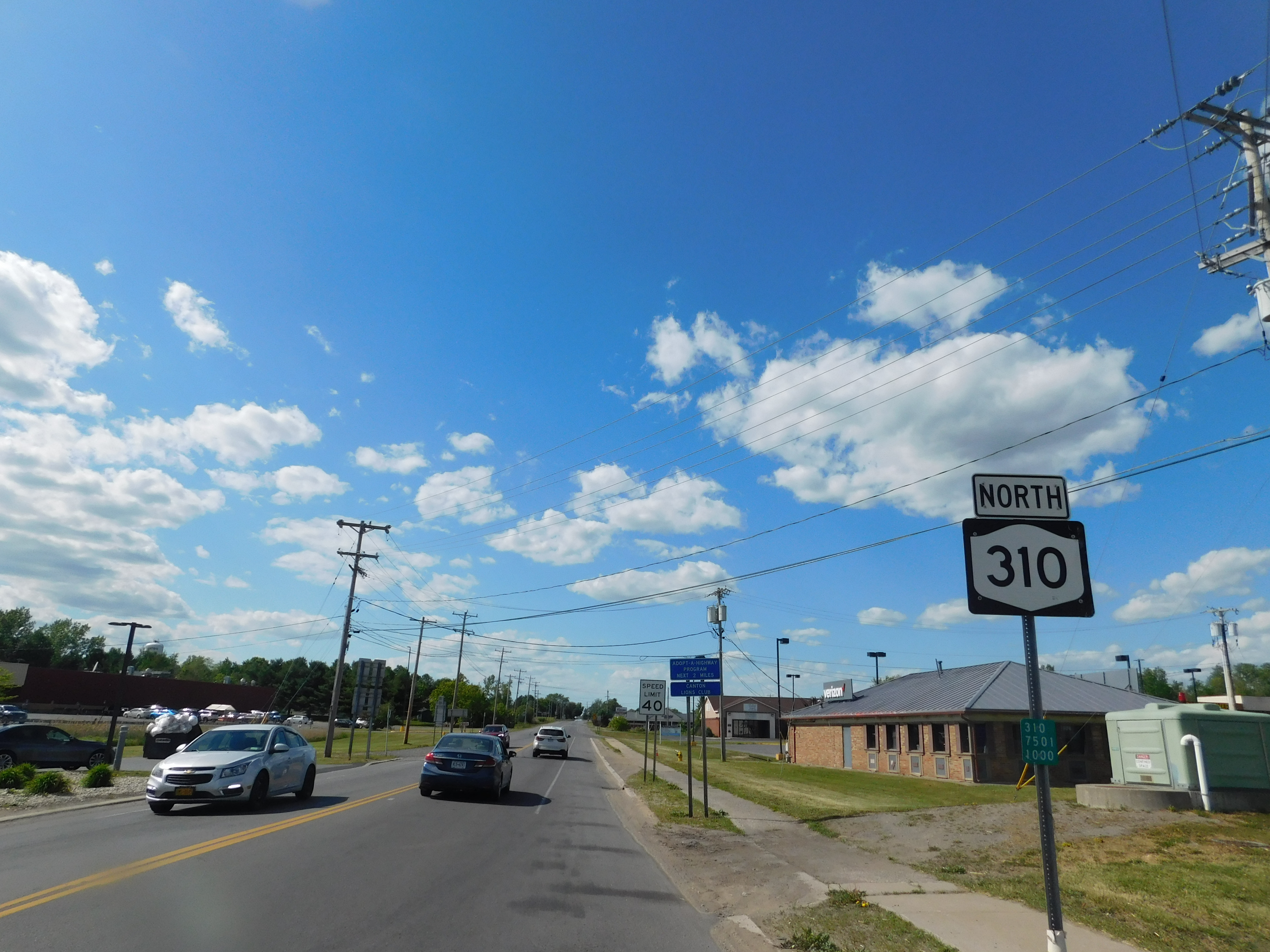
NY 310 north from US 11 and NY 68 in Canton

NY 310 begins at an intersection with US 11 and NY 68 in the town of Canton. NY 310 proceeds northwestward on a right-of-way abandoned by NY 68, which turned west towards the village of Canton. Bypassing the village, the route proceeds away from St. Lawrence University on a two-lane residential and commercial roadway, bending northward into a junction with State Street. Running north through Canton, NY 310 remains residential for several blocks, crossing over to a rural nature near the town line, where it crosses into the town of Potsdam.

Now in Potsdam, NY 310 retains its rural nature, winding northward through an intersection with CR 34, which connects to the hamlet of Bucks Bridge. Now running in distance of the Grasse River, NY 310 leaves the town of Potsdam for the town of Madrid. Crossing over tracks for the New York and Ogdensburg Railway, NY 310 enters the hamlet of Madrid and becomes a two-lane residential road for two blocks, intersecting with NY 345. After NY 345, the route leaves Madrid hamlet with the new moniker of Madrid–Norfolk Road, winding northeast along the Grasse River as a two-lane rural road.

Just north of Rutherford Road, NY 310 turns away from the Grasse River, proceeding northeast towards Trout Brook. At the junction with Planty Road, NY 310 and Trout Brook begin running alongside each other, entering a large junction with CR 38 (Madrid–Norfolk Road) and CR 44 (Norfolk–Chamberlain Corners Road). NY 310 continues northeast from this junction without the moniker, crossing from Madrid into the town of Norfolk. After a couple of miles, the route crosses a junction with Stark Road and enters the hamlet of Raymondville. In Raymondville, NY 310 becomes a two-lane residential road as it approaches the Raquette River. Running northeast, NY 310 enters a junction with CR 39 and NY 56, a large junction marking the northern terminus of NY 310.

== History ==
New York State Route 56A
- Location: Potsdam–Norfolk
- Existed: 1930–April 10, 1980

The portion of modern NY 310 from NY 345 in Madrid to CR 38 near Norfolk was originally designated as part of NY 56A in the 1930 renumbering. South of Madrid, the route followed what is now NY 345 to meet NY 56 in Potsdam; in the vicinity of Norfolk, the route used current CR 38. Although signed as a state highway, the segment of NY 56A from the modern junction of NY 310 and NY 345 in Madrid to River Road west of Norfolk was maintained by St. Lawrence County. NY 56A remained unchanged until its deletion on April 10, 1980.

The NY 310 designation was created on September 1, 1982, as a result of a highway maintenance swap between New York State, St. Lawrence County, and the towns of Norfolk and Canton. As part of the swap, the state assumed maintenance over all of what is now NY 310, which had been county-maintained from State Street north of Canton to Madrid–Norfolk Road west of Norfolk and town-maintained past those points. In exchange, the county was given control over the portion of West Main Street (former NY 56A) between River Road and NY 56.

== Major intersections ==
The entire route is in St. Lawrence County.

| Location | mi | km | Destinations | Notes |
|---|---|---|---|---|
| Village of Canton | 0.00 | 0.00 | US 11 / NY 68 – Potsdam, Canton | Southern terminus |
| Community of Madrid | 10.69 | 17.20 | NY 345 – Waddington | |
| Town of Norfolk | 21.43 | 34.49 | NY 56 – Massena, Potsdam | Northern terminus; hamlet of Raymondville |
1.000 mi = 1.609 km; 1.000 km = 0.621 mi

== See also ==
- List of county routes in St. Lawrence County, New York
