= Higley Falls Reservoir =

- Location within New York Location within the United States
- Location: St. Lawrence County, New York, United States
- Coordinates: 44°31′20″N 74°55′50″W
- Type: Reservoir
- Primary inflows: Raquette River, Warm Brook, Little Cold Brook
- Primary outflows: Raquette River
- Basin countries: United States
- Surface area: 698 acres (2.82 km^{2})
- Average depth: 12 feet (3.7 m)
- Max. depth: 32 feet (9.8 m)
- Shore length^{1}: 15.8 miles (25.4 km)
- Surface elevation: 882 feet (269 m)
- Islands: 3
- Settlements: South Colton, New York
- ^{1} Shore length is not a well-defined measure.

Higley Falls Reservoir, also known as Higley Flow, is a man-made lake located on the Raquette River between Colton and South Colton, New York. Fish species present in the reservoir are smallmouth bass, northern pike, black bullhead, and walleye. There is a concrete ramp boat launch located in Higley Flow State Park.
