= Raymondville Parabolic Bridge =

- U.S. National Register of Historic Places
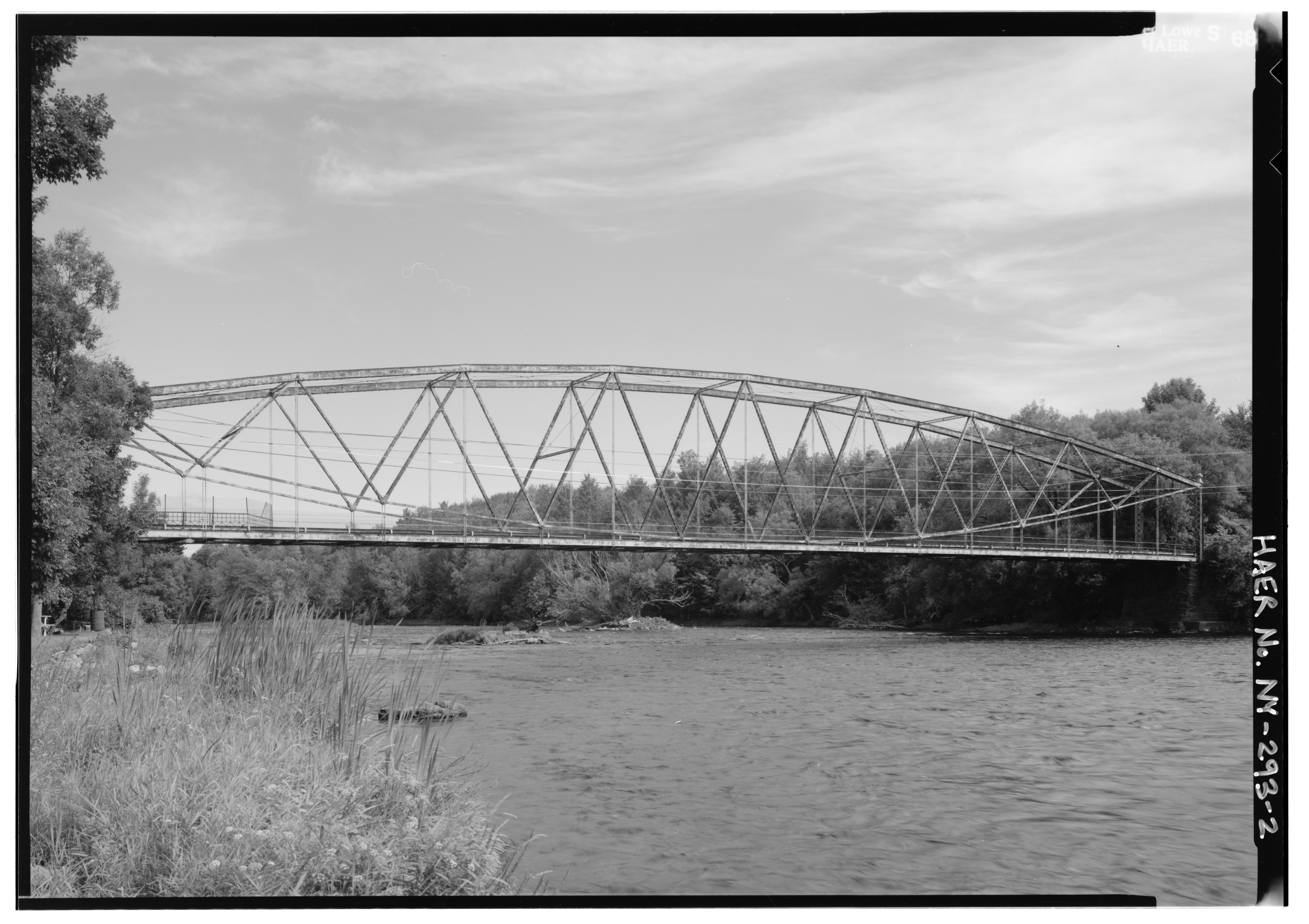

- Location within New York Location within the United States
- Location: Grant Road over Raquette River, Raymondville, New York
- Coordinates: 44°50′23″N 74°58′46″W
- Area: less than one acre
- Built: 1885
- Architect: Berlin Iron Bridge Co.
- Architectural style: Lenticular Truss
- NRHP reference No.: 84002961
- Added to NRHP: September 7, 1984

Raymondville Parabolic Bridge is a historic lenticular truss bridge located at Raymondville in St. Lawrence County, New York. It was constructed in 1886 and spans the Raquette River. It was constructed by the Berlin Iron Bridge Co. of East Berlin, Connecticut. It was closed to vehicular traffic in 1979 was used briefly as a pedestrian bridge. then closed completely to all traffic for safety reasons. There is now no public access to the bridge's actual deck, but both approaches are accessible on foot. There is a nearby similar but shorter version of this bridge also built by the Berlin Iron Bridge Co. still in use linking River Road and NY 56 at Yaleville, New York. In the late 1950s tragedy struck on the parabolic bridge. A small boy while walking to school one morning lost his footing and slipped on some ice and fell under the railing into the Raquette River where he drowned.

It was listed on the National Register of Historic Places in 1984.

== See also ==
- List of bridges documented by the Historic American Engineering Record in New York (state)
- Parabolic arch
