= Rainbow Falls Reservoir =

- Location within New York Rainbow Falls Reservoir (the United States)
- Location: St. Lawrence County, New York, United States
- Coordinates: 44°30′32″N 74°47′25″W
- Type: Reservoir
- Primary inflows: Raquette River, Rainbow Brook
- Primary outflows: Raquette River
- Basin countries: United States
- Surface area: 665 acres (2.69 km^{2})
- Average depth: 7 feet (2.1 m)
- Max. depth: 45 feet (14 m)
- Shore length^{1}: 11.6 miles (18.7 km)
- Surface elevation: 1,181 feet (360 m)
- Islands: 5
- Settlements: South Colton, New York
- ^{1} Shore length is not a well-defined measure.

Rainbow Falls Reservoir is a man-made lake located east of South Colton, New York, as part of the Raquette River. It is within the town of Parishville, New York, though the hamlet of South Colton is the closest community accessible by car via Raquette River Road. Fish species present in the reservoir are smallmouth bass, northern pike, yellow perch, black bullhead, rock bass, and walleye. There is a boat launch located on Raquette River Road.
