= Catamount Mountain =

Mountain in New York, United States

- Location within New York Adirondack Park Location within the United States

Highest point
- Elevation: 1,814 feet (553 m)
- Coordinates: 44°25′32″N 74°45′24″W

Geography
- Location: SE of South Colton, St. Lawrence County, New York, U.S.
- Topo map: USGS Stark

Catamount Mountain is a 1,814-foot-tall (553 m) mountain in the Adirondack Mountains of New York. It is located southeast of South Colton in St. Lawrence County. In 1917, a 35-foot-tall (11 m) steel fire lookout tower was built on the mountain. The tower ceased fire lookout operations and was later removed in the early 1980s.

== History ==
In 1911, the Conservation Commission built a wood fire lookout tower on the mountain. In 1917, the Conservation Commission replaced the wood tower with a 35-foot-tall (11 m) Aermotor LS40 tower. Due to the increased use of aerial detection, the tower was closed at the end of the 1971 fire lookout season. The structure, which was on private land, was removed in the early 1980s.
