= Leonard Pond =

Lake in New York, United States

- Location within New York Leonard Pond (the United States)
- Location: St. Lawrence County, New York, United States
- Coordinates: 44°19′54″N 74°44′15″W
- Type: Lake
- Basin countries: United States
- Surface area: 50 acres (0.20 km^{2})
- Max. depth: 11 feet (3.4 m)
- Shore length^{1}: 1.4 miles (2.3 km)
- Surface elevation: 1,473 feet (449 m)
- Settlements: Sevey, New York
- ^{1} Shore length is not a well-defined measure.

Leonard Pond is a lake located in Sevey, New York, USA. The outlet creek flows into the Raquette River. Fish species present in the lake are white sucker, smallmouth bass, largemouth bass, yellow perch and black bullhead. Access is by a trail off State Route 56 on the west shore.
