= Colton Flow =

- Location within New York
- Location: St. Lawrence County, New York, United States
- Coordinates: 44.3306°N 74.5603°W
- Type: Lake
- Primary inflows: Raquette River
- Primary outflows: Raquette River
- Basin countries: United States
- Surface area: 150 acres (0.61 km^{2})
- Average depth: 7 feet (2.1 m)
- Max. depth: 25 feet (7.6 m)
- Shore length^{1}: 9.3 miles (15.0 km)
- Surface elevation: 837 feet (255 m)
- Islands: 17
- Settlements: Colton, New York
- ^{1} Shore length is not a well-defined measure.

Colton Flow is a lake located on the Raquette River at Colton, New York. Fish species present in the reservoir are smallmouth bass, northern pike, rock bass, yellow perch, black bullhead, and walleye. There is a boat launch located on Gulf Road.
