= Whites Hill (New York) =

Mountain in New York, United States

- Location within New York Adirondack Park Location within the United States

Highest point
- Elevation: 1,427 feet (435 m)
- Coordinates: 44°35′41″N 74°46′28″W

Geography
- Location: SE of Parishville, St. Lawrence County, New York, U.S.
- Topo map: USGS Rainbow Falls

Whites Hill is a 1,427-foot-tall (435 m) mountain in the northern Adirondack Mountains of New York. It is located southeast of Parishville in St. Lawrence County. The mountain is the former site of an 80-foot-tall (24 m) steel fire lookout tower that was in service from 1951 to 1971.

== History ==
In 1950, the Conservation Department built an 80-foot-tall (24 m) Aermotor LS40 steel fire lookout tower on the mountain. The tower began fire lookout operations in 1951, reporting 3 fires and 588 visitors. Due to increased use of aerial detection, the tower ceased fire lookout operations at the end of the 1971 fire lookout season and was later removed. The cabin was later moved to the New York State Department of Environmental Conservation's Trout Lake Shop where it is used by Operations Unit personnel.
