= Five Falls Reservoir =

- Location within New York Five Falls Reservoir (the United States)
- Location: St. Lawrence County, New York, United States
- Coordinates: 44°31′51″N 74°50′17″W
- Type: Reservoir
- Primary inflows: Raquette River
- Primary outflows: Raquette River
- Basin countries: United States
- Surface area: 145 acres (0.59 km^{2})
- Average depth: 21 feet (6.4 m)
- Max. depth: 40 feet (12 m)
- Shore length^{1}: 3.2 miles (5.1 km)
- Surface elevation: 1,076 feet (328 m)
- Islands: 5
- Settlements: South Colton, New York
- ^{1} Shore length is not a well-defined measure.

Five Falls Reservoir is a man-made lake located on the Raquette River east of South Colton, New York. Fish species present in the reservoir are smallmouth bass, white sucker, northern pike, yellow perch, rock bass, and walleye. There is a boat launch located on the southwest shore off Three Falls Lane.
