= New York State Route 56 =

State highway in St. Lawrence County, New York, US

New York State Route 56
- NY 56 highlighted in red and NY 970C in blue

Route information
- Maintained by NYSDOT
- Length: 51.44 mi (82.78 km)
- Existed: 1930–present

Major junctions
- South end: NY 3 in Colton
- US 11 in Potsdam
- North end: NY 37 in Louisville

Location
- Country: United States
- State: New York
- Counties: St. Lawrence

Highway system
- New York Highways; Interstate; US; State; Reference; Parkways
← NY 55A	→ NY 56A

New York State Route 56 (NY 56) is a 51.44-mile-long (82.78 km) north–south state highway in eastern St. Lawrence County, New York, in the United States. The southern terminus of the route is at an intersection with NY 3 in the town of Colton. Its northern terminus is at a junction with NY 37 southwest of Massena in the town of Louisville. NY 56 follows the Raquette River for most of its length and serves the village of Potsdam, where it passes by the campus of State University of New York at Potsdam.

== Route description ==
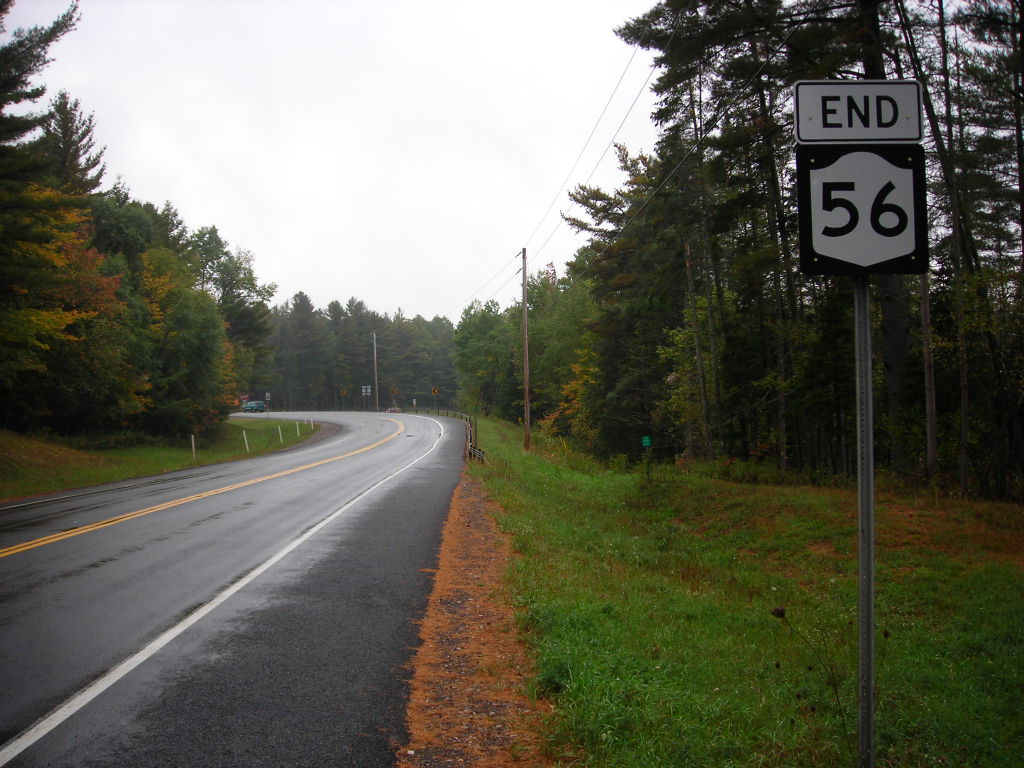
NY 56 southbound at NY 3, the southern terminus, in Sevey Corners

NY 56 begins at an intersection with NY 3 in the town of Colton and the hamlet of Sevey Corners. NY 56 proceeds northeastward through the hamlet of Sevey along a two-lane highway through dense woods of the Adirondack Park, paralleling the Raquette River past Chandler Pond. The Raquette soon diverges into the Carry Falls Reservoir, while NY 56 continues northwestward, passing a western jaunt of the reservoir. Turning west from the Raquette, the route enters the town of Parishville and the hamlet of Stark. Stark consists of one building and more dense woods. After re-entering the town of Colton, NY 56 bends northward and soon northwestward out of the Adirondack Park. After leaving the park, NY 56 enters the hamlets of Irish Settlement (the site of a very dangerous S-Curve until 2013) and South Colton. In South Colton, NY 56 passes a long stretch of residences before turning westward at a crossing of the Raquette River. NY 56 leaves South Colton, passes north of Higley Flow State Park, and enters the hamlet of Colton. In Colton, NY 56 intersects with CR 58 (Colton-Parishville Road). After crossing the Raquette for the second time, NY 56 intersects with the eastern terminus of NY 68 (Colton-Pierrepont Road).

Crossing through Colton, NY 56 passes some residences and businesses before leaving the hamlet to the northwest. Crossing a former alignment of itself, NY 56 enters the town of Pierrepont. The route intersects with CR 24 (Brown Bridge Road). NY 56 remains primarily residential as the two-lane highway bends northward along the Raquette River. Along this northern stretch, the backdrop remains residential, intersecting with CR 59 (Back Hannawa Road). NY 56 turns eastward at this junction, crosses the Raquette River for the third time since South Colton and entering the hamlet of Hannawa Falls. Hannawa Falls is a small hamlet with a mix of residences and commercial buildings. State Route 56 continues north, leaving Hannawa Falls, and passes by the Potsdam Town and Country Club before intersecting with the western terminus of NY 72. After NY 56 bends to the northwest, passing the State University of New York at Potsdam campus before entering the village of Potsdam.

In Potsdam village, NY 56 parallels the Raquette River along Pierrepont Avenue until the intersection with Main Street, where NY 56 turns west onto Main. At the intersection with Market Street, NY 56 turns northward onto Market, intersecting with US 11 (Elm Street). The two routes are on a wrong-way concurrency for three village blocks, until US 11 turns westward onto Sandstone Drive. NY 56 continues north along Market Street as a two-lane commercial street, paralleling a nearby railroad line through the village. Soon after leaving the village of Potsdam and re-entering the namesake town, NY 56 loses its Market Street moniker, entering the hamlet of Sisson. At Sisson, the railroad line crosses NY 56 and soon into the hamlet of Unionville. Returning to the riverside of the Raquette River, NY 56 intersects with Dry Bridge Road, which connects to CR 48 at the Norwood village line. Through Norwood, NY 56 passes residences until intersecting with Park Street, which connects to CR 35 outside of Norwood. NY 56 crosses a railroad junction on its way out of the village, entering the town of Norfolk.

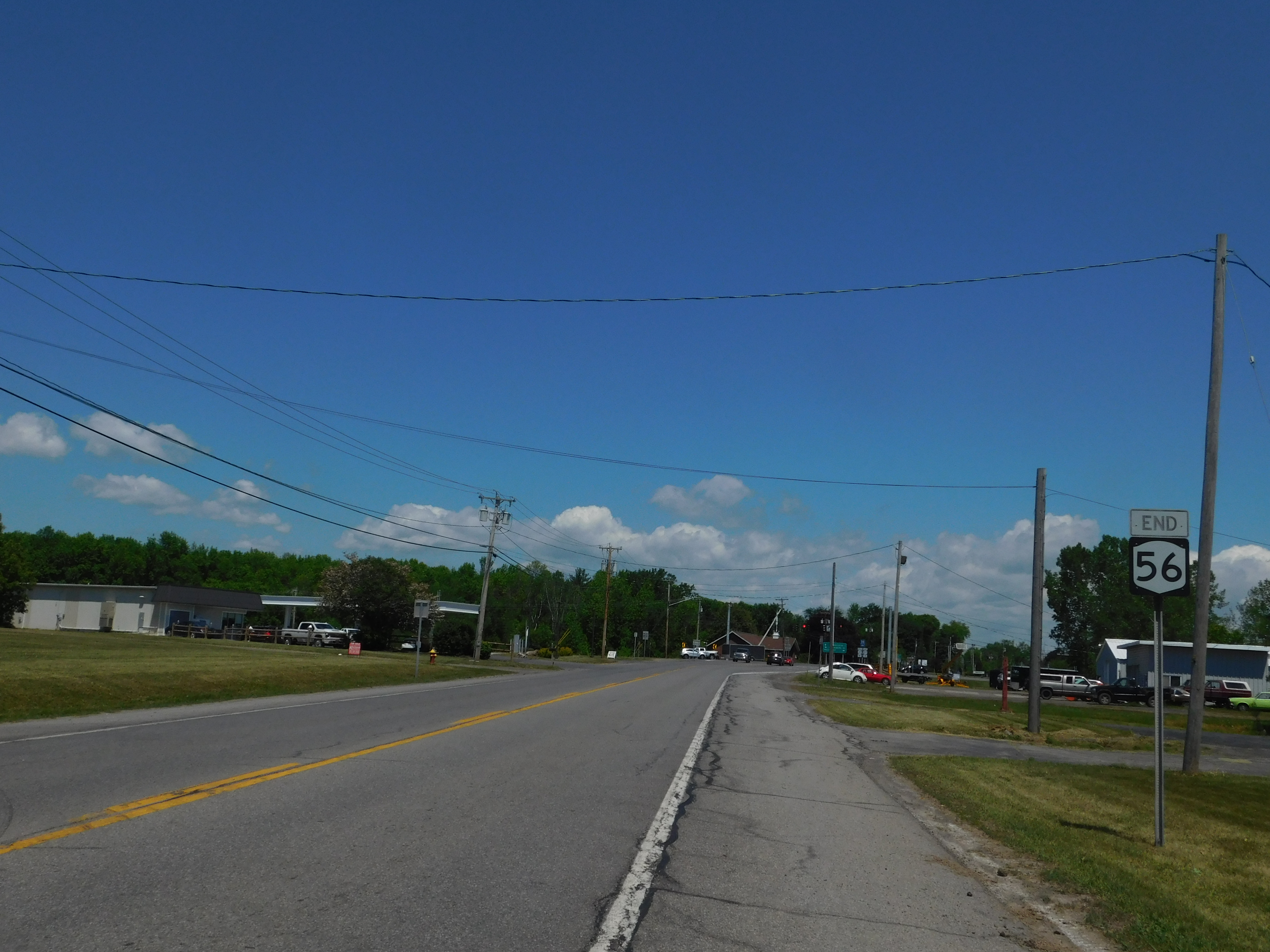
NY 56 approaching NY 37 in Louisville

Through Norfolk, NY 56 intersects with CR 47 (Knapps Station Road) and CR 38A (West Main Street). North of the village, NY 56 intersects CR 38 (Furnace Street), the former junction with NY 56A. NY 56 continues northward into the hamlet of Raymondville. In Raymondville, NY 56 passes a stretch of residences south of the Raymondville Golf and Country Club. At the country club, NY 56 intersects with the northern terminus of NY 310, where the highway turns northeastward along the riverbank until a junction with CR 40 (West Hatfield Road). At CR 40, NY 56 makes a bend to the north, entering the town of Louisville. Through Louisville, NY 56 remains predominantly rural, until reaching the border with the village of Massena. At the village line, NY 56 intersects with NY 37 (Seaway Trail / Aluminum Workers Memorial Highway). This intersection serves as the northern terminus of NY 56 while the right-of-way continues into Massena as Andrews Street.

== History ==
NY 56 was assigned as part of the 1930 renumbering of state highways in New York to an alignment extending from NY 3 in the town of Colton to NY 420 south of Massena. In the vicinity of Massena, NY 56 was originally routed on West Hatfield Road. NY 56 was realigned c. 1937 to follow a new highway into Massena, where it ended at a junction with NY 420 (Main Street) just south of where NY 420 ended at NY 37.

In the mid-1950s, construction began on a new alignment for NY 37 around the southern edge of Massena. The highway opened to traffic by 1958; however, NY 56 continued to extend past the bypass into Massena until the early 1960s, when it was cut back to its junction with NY 37's new routing. The former routing of NY 56 in Massena is still state-maintained as NY 970C, an unsigned reference route designation for Andrews Street between NY 37 and Main Street (itself unsigned NY 970B).

== NY 56A ==
New York State Route 56A
- Location: Potsdam–Norfolk
- Existed: 1930–April 10, 1980

NY 56A was an alternate route of NY 56 between Potsdam and Norfolk in St. Lawrence County. The route began in Potsdam, headed northwest to Madrid, then turned northeast and continued to its northern terminus in Norfolk. NY 56A was assigned in 1930 and removed in 1980. The portion of former NY 56A from Madrid to Potsdam, as well as the state-maintained Bridge Street connector, became part of a rerouted NY 345 on September 1, 1982, as a result of a highway maintenance swap between the state of New York and St. Lawrence County.

== Major intersections ==
The entire route is in St. Lawrence County.

Location	mi	km	Destinations	Notes
Town of Colton	0.00	0.00	NY 3 – Tupper Lake, Cranberry Lake, Star Lake	Southern terminus; hamlet of Sevey Corners
Town of Colton	22.93	36.90	NY 68 west (Colton-Pierrepont Road) – Canton	Eastern terminus of NY 68; hamlet of Colton
Town of Potsdam	30.82	49.60	NY 72 east – Parishville	Western terminus of NY 72
Village of Potsdam	32.46	52.24	Park Street ( NY 971T) –	Former routing of NY 56; southern terminus of unsigned NY 971T; signed as US 11 north (northbound)
Village of Potsdam	32.68	52.59	Maple Street ( NY 971U) – Canton	Former routing of US 11; eastern terminus of unsigned NY 971U
Village of Potsdam	32.76	52.72	US 11 north (Elm Street)	Southern terminus of US 11 / NY 56 overlap
Village of Potsdam	32.93	53.00	US 11 south (Sandstone Drive) – Canton, Clarkson University	Northern terminus of US 11 / NY 56 overlap
Town of Norfolk	41.80	67.27	CR 38A (West Main Street) – Madrid	Former eastern terminus of NY 56A; hamlet of Norfolk
Town of Norfolk	45.29	72.89	NY 310 south	Northern terminus of NY 310; hamlet of Raymondville
Louisville	51.44	82.78	NY 37 (Seaway Trail / Aluminum Workers Memorial Highway) – Ogdensburg, Malone	Northern terminus
Louisville	51.44	82.78	Andrews Street ( NY 970C) – Massena	Continuation beyond northern terminus
1.000 mi = 1.609 km; 1.000 km = 0.621 mi: Concurrency terminus
