= Norfolk, New York =

- Town
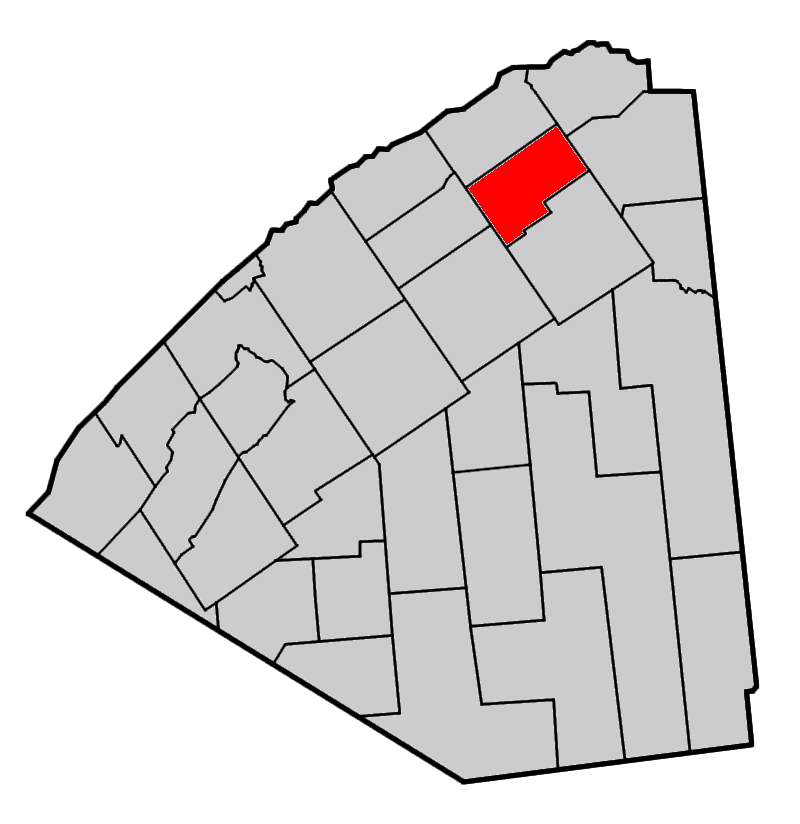
- Map highlighting Norfolk's location within St. Lawrence County.

- Location of Norfolk in New York
- Coordinates: 44°47′56″N 74°58′58″W
- Country: United States
- State: New York
- County: St. Lawrence
- Settled: 1809
- Created: 1823

Area
  - Total: 57.74 sq mi (149.55 km^{2})
  - Land: 56.74 sq mi (146.96 km^{2})
  - Water: 1.00 sq mi (2.60 km^{2})

Population (2020)
  - Total: 4,453
  - Density: 78/sq mi (30.3/km^{2})
- FIPS code: 36-089-51330

Norfolk (/nɒr'fɒrk/) is a town in St. Lawrence County in the U.S. state of New York. The town is in the northern part of the county and is north of Potsdam. The population was 4,453 at the 2020 census.

== History ==
The town was first settled around 1869.

The town was formed in 1869 from part of the Town of Louisville. In 1869, part of Norfolk was returned to Louisville, and part of the Town of Stockholm was added to Norfolk in 1869.

A small part of Norfolk was lost when the community of "Raquetteville" incorporated as the Village of Potsdam Junction in 1869. In 1875, it became Norwood.

The Hepburn Library was listed on the National Register of Historic Places in 1969.

== Notable people ==
- Calvin H. Robbins (1840-1900), Minnesota state representative and physician
- William Pierce Rogers (1913–2001), U.S. Attorney General, U.S. Secretary of State
- Horace Adolphus Taylor (1837–1910), Wisconsin State Senator, Chairman of the Republican Party of Wisconsin

== Geography ==
According to the United States Census Bureau, the town has a total area of 57.7 square miles (149.5 km^{2}), of which 56.7 square miles (147.0 km^{2}) is land and 2.0 square mile (2.6 km^{2}) (1.74%) is water.

The Raquette River flows eastward through the northern part of the town.

New York State Route 56 is a north–south highway in Norfolk. The eastern terminus of New York State Route 310 is at Raymondville. New York State Route 420 parallels the eastern town line.

== Demographics ==
Historical population
| Census | Pop. | Note | %± |
|---|---|---|---|
| 1830 | 1,309 | | — |
| 1840 | 1,728 | | 32.0% |
| 1850 | 1,753 | | 1.4% |
| 1860 | 2,329 | | 32.9% |
| 1870 | 2,441 | | 4.8% |
| 1880 | 2,471 | | 1.2% |
| 1890 | 2,024 | | −18.1% |
| 1900 | 1,911 | | −5.6% |
| 1910 | 2,938 | | 53.7% |
| 1920 | 3,066 | | 4.4% |
| 1930 | 3,047 | | −0.6% |
| 1940 | 3,427 | | 12.5% |
| 1950 | 3,481 | | 1.6% |
| 1960 | 4,590 | | 31.9% |
| 1970 | 4,701 | | 2.4% |
| 1980 | 4,992 | | 6.2% |
| 1990 | 4,258 | | −14.7% |
| 2000 | 4,565 | | 7.2% |
| 2010 | 4,668 | | 2.3% |
| 2020 | 4,453 | | −4.6% |
U.S. Decennial Census

As of the census of 2000, there were 4,565 people, 1,803 households, and 1,280 families residing in the town. The population density was 80.2 inhabitants per square mile (31.0/km^{2}). There were 1,959 housing units at an average density of 34.4 per square mile (13.3/km^{2}). The racial makeup of the town was 97.06% White, 0.42% Black or African American, 1.07% Native American, 0.48% Asian, 0.09% Pacific Islander, 0.11% from other races, and 0.77% from two or more races. Hispanic or Latino of any race were 0.55% of the population.

There were 1,803 households, out of which 31.7% had children under the age of 18 living with them, 55.1% were married couples living together, 10.6% had a female householder with no husband present, and 29.0% were non-families. 21.9% of all households were made up of individuals, and 11.1% had someone living alone who was 65 years of age or older. The average household size was 2.53 and the average family size was 2.91.

In the town, the population was spread out, with 25.2% under the age of 18, 7.1% from 18 to 24, 28.1% from 25 to 44, 25.8% from 45 to 64, and 13.9% who were 65 years of age or older. The median age was 38 years. For every 100 females, there were 98.1 males. For every 100 females age 18 and over, there were 93.2 males.

The median income for a household in the town was 54,492, and the median income for a family was $37,644. Males had a median income of $65,769 versus $59,732 for females. The per capita income for the town was $57,099. About 9.3% of families and 1.7% of the population were below the poverty line, including 2.7% of those under age 18 and 3.3% of those age 65 or over.

== Communities and locations in Norfolk ==
- Dishaw – A hamlet at the northern town line.
- Grantville – A hamlet in the northern part of Norfolk, north of Plumbrook.
- Marble Hill – An elevation east of Norfolk village.
- Norfolk – The hamlet of Norfolk, north of Norwood on NY-56. This was the locale of the first settlement in the town.
- Norwood – The northern part of the village of Norwood, on NY-56, is in the southwestern section of Norfolk.
- Plumbrook – A hamlet in the eastern part of the town on County Route 38 (Plum Brook Road).
- Raymondville – is a hamlet north of Norfolk hamlet on NY-56, by the western town line and the Raquette River. It was previously called "Racketon." The Raymondville Parabolic Bridge was listed on the National Register of Historic Places in 1984.
- Yaleville – A hamlet south of Norfolk hamlet on NY-56, by the Raquette River.
