= The Hudson City Times =

Newspaper

The Hudson City Times was an American weekly newspaper based in Hudson, Wisconsin and owned by two brothers between the years 1860 and 1864. Established in 1855, the newspaper typically consisted of four pages size 28x44 and was published every Friday. Having served as senator in St. Croix County between 1889 and 1890 and many other political positions throughout his life, one of the paper’s editor, Horace A. Taylor, held strong Republican beliefs which he preached throughout the contents of the Hudson City Times. Aligning with this theme, the Hudson City Times had the tagline “Where liberty dwells is my country,” a quote which is said to be from a letter that Benjamin Franklin wrote to Benjamin Vaughan on March 14, 1783. The paper had a $2 subscription fee and claimed to have a circulation of around 950

== Origins ==
The Hudson City Times was originally called the Hudson Chronicle before it was purchased by its editor, Horace A. Taylor. Mr. Taylor eventually purchased the Hudson Star and decided to combine it with the Hudson City Times in 1854, eventually creating a new weekly paper called the Hudson Times and Star which lasted nearly thirty years.

== Editor ==
Horace Adolphus Taylor was born in St. Lawrence County, New York in 1837. After moving to River Falls, Wisconsin in 1855 spending his days working on a farm, Mr. Taylor tried his hand in real estate before eventually making his way to the newspaper business.

He partnered with his brother Lute A. Taylor and created the River Falls Journal, but three years later decided to give the paper to his sibling. After doing so, he moved to Hudson, Wisconsin and purchased the Hudson Chronicle, which later became the Hudson City Times. The two brothers also owned the La Crosse Morning Leader, another newspaper, between 1869 and 1871. Mr. Taylor found himself very rewarded by his newspaper endeavors and used his earnings from the industry to invest in property, banking, lumber and mining.

Horace was also very successful and influential in politics as a Republican delegate to the national conventions in 1876 and 1884, a chairman of the Republican state central committee from 1883 to 1887 and an agent for the St. Croix Land Grant from 1876 to 1881. The presidents at this time, James Garfield and Chester A. Arthur, appointed him as U.S. Consul in Marseilles, France between 1881 and 1883, state senator from St. Croix County in 1889 until 1890 as well as the U.S. railroad commissioner. Mr. Taylor retired from the railroad commission in 1893 and went back to Madison, Wisconsin where he was also an editor for the Wisconsin State Journal, a leading Republican newspaper in the state for its time, when he lived between 1881 and 1901. His last appointment was assistant secretary of the U.S. Treasury in Washington, D.C. where he eventually retired in 1906. Thereafter he returned to his home in Madison in 1906 until he died four years later.
