= New York State Route 68 =

State highway in St. Lawrence County, New York, US

New York State Route 68
- Map of the North Country with NY 68 highlighted in red

Route information
- Maintained by NYSDOT and the city of Ogdensburg
- Length: 33.43 mi (53.80 km)
- Existed: mid-1920s–present

Major junctions
- West end: NY 37 near Ogdensburg
- US 11 in Canton
- East end: NY 56 in Colton

Location
- Country: United States
- State: New York
- Counties: St. Lawrence

Highway system
- New York Highways; Interstate; US; State; Reference; Parkways
← NY 67	→ NY 69

New York State Route 68 (NY 68) is an east–west state highway located entirely within St. Lawrence County in the North Country of New York in the United States. The western terminus is at an intersection with NY 37 in Oswegatchie, just west of the Ogdensburg city limits. The eastern terminus is at a junction with NY 56 in the hamlet of Colton within the town of Colton. Along the way, NY 68 passes through the village of Canton, where it overlaps with U.S. Route 11 (US 11) through the village.

NY 68 was assigned in the mid-1920s, but only from Canton to Ogdensburg. The route was extended to Colton in 1930, then truncated slightly to end at the NY 37 bypass in the 1970s. NY 68 was re-extended to its current length in 1982 as part of a highway maintenance swap between New York State and St. Lawrence County.

== Route description ==
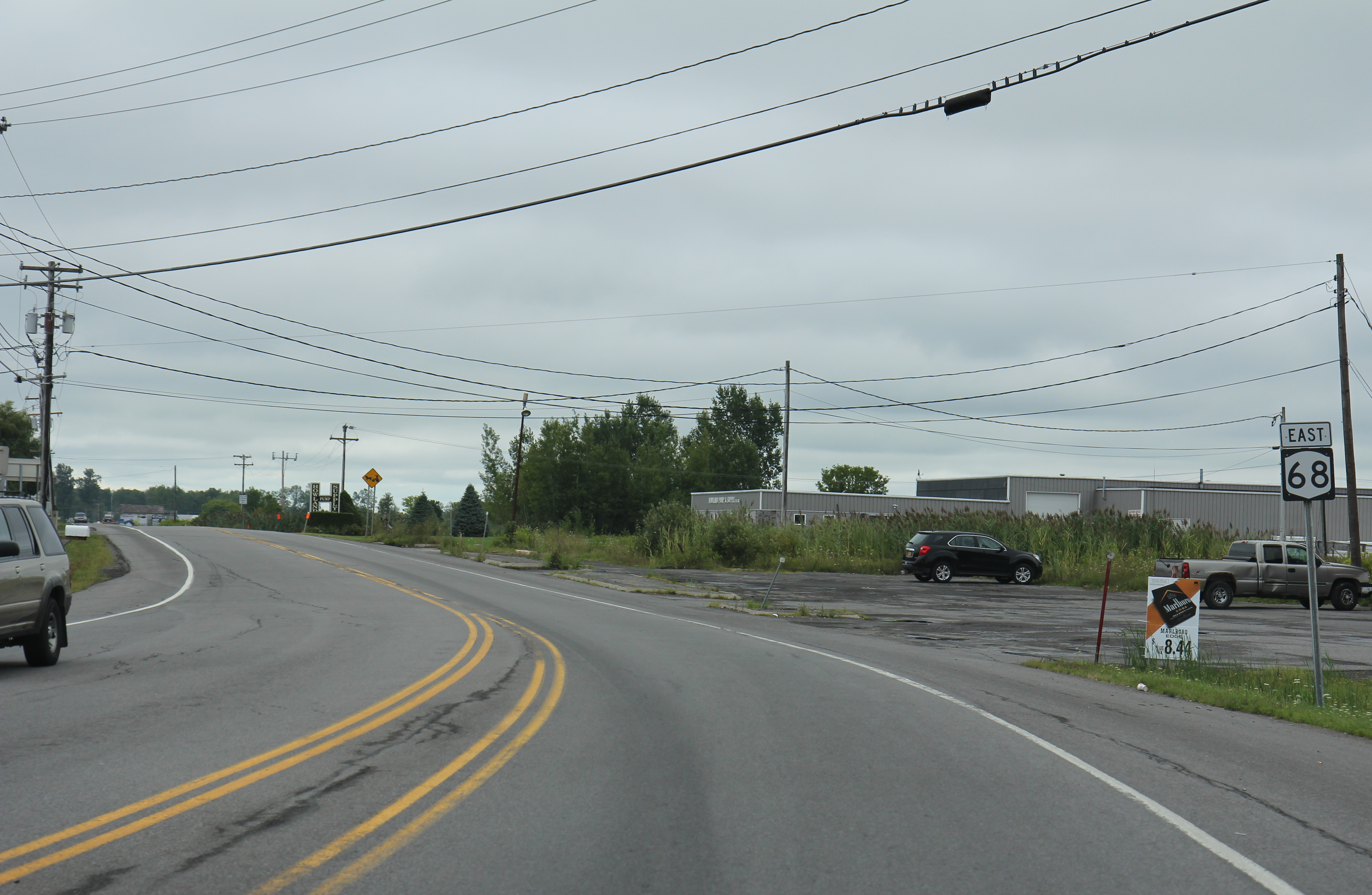
Looking northwest at west terminus

The vast majority of NY 68 is maintained by New York State Department of Transportation (NYSDOT). The only section not maintained by the state lies within the city of Ogdensburg, where the route is locally maintained from the junction of State and Canton Streets to the southeastern city line.

NY 68 begins at an intersection with NY 37 (the Seaway Trail) in Ogdensburg. The route heads to the northeast, along the outskirts of downtown Ogdensburg. Along the way, it passes residential homes and several commercial businesses, parallelling the MacDonald-Cartier Freeway (Highway 401) to the north in Ontario and NY 37 to the south. NY 68 crosses a branch of the St. Lawrence River in downtown Ogdensburg, passing Crescent Park soon after. NY 68 heads to the south, intersecting with NY 37 once again along with NY 812 near the Seaway Shopping Center.

After NY 37 and NY 812, the road begins to leave Ogdensburg, and the lands around NY 68 become less developed. NY 68 passes the Ogdensburg International Airport after the intersection with County Route 28A (CR 28A). The highway crosses through Oswegatchie uneventfully, entering the hamlet of Flackville. Much of the region between Ogdensburg and Canton is mostly fields, and NY 68 heads through sparsely populated areas until it reaches Canton. The highway parallels a creek before entering the village of Canton.

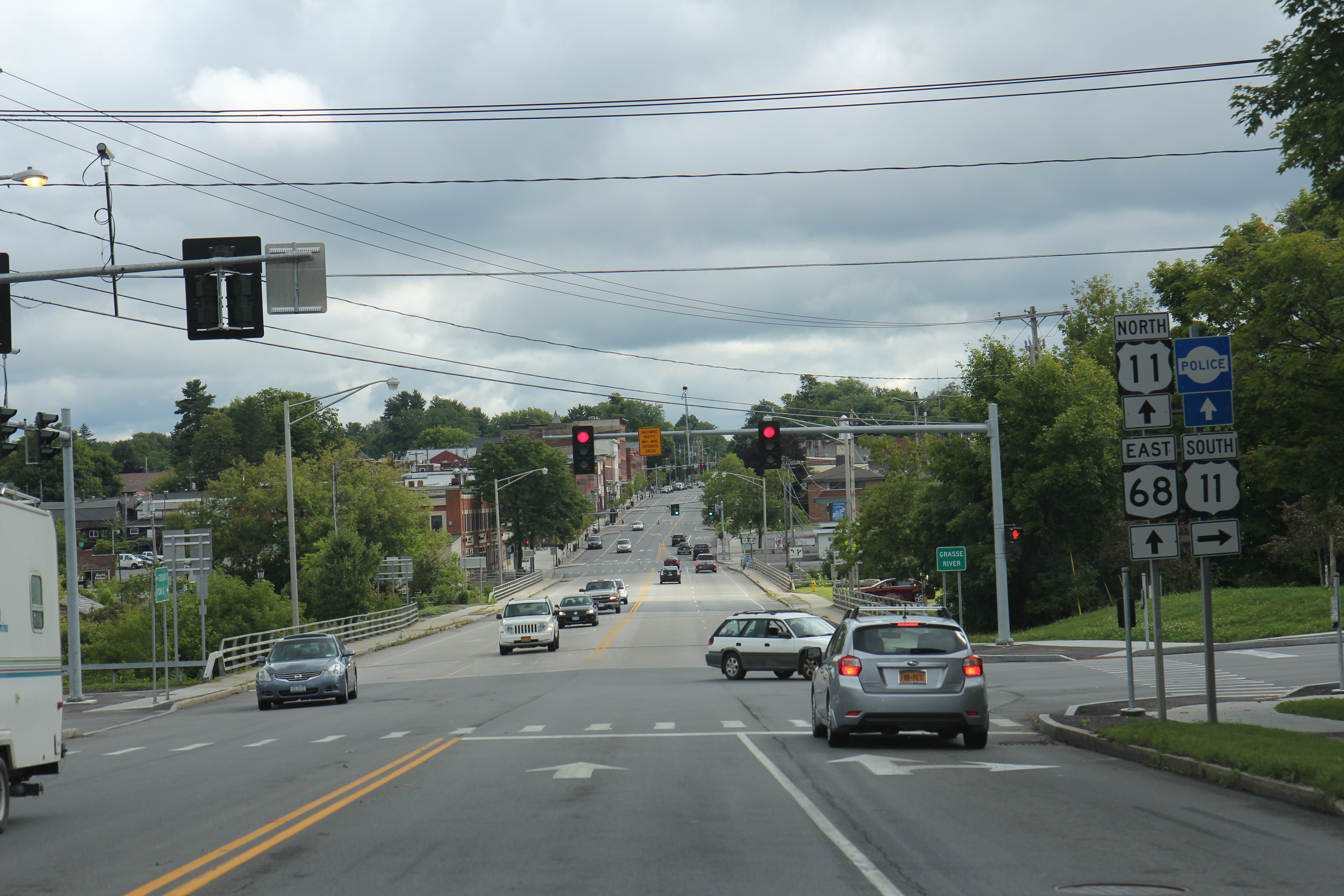
US 11 and NY 68 merge in Canton

In downtown Canton, NY 68 intersects with US 11 before passing Rushton Falls. US 11 and NY 68 become concurrent through downtown Canton, passing St. Lawrence University and its golf course. At the intersection with NY 310, US 11 and NY 68 split, with NY 68 heading to the southeast. The urbanization of NY 68 quickly dissipates again, going down hills for some distance. When the road enters the hamlet of Langdons Corners, it passes to the north of Watermann Hill. Several miles later, NY 68 enters Colton and terminates at an intersection with NY 56.

== History ==
When NY 68 was assigned in the mid-1920s, it extended only from US 11 in Canton to the intersection of State and Ford Streets (then-NY 3 and later NY 37) in Ogdensburg. In the 1930 renumbering of state highways in New York, NY 68 was extended eastward through Canton to Colton, where it ended at NY 56. In the late 1950s, NY 37 was rerouted to bypass Ogdensburg to the south on a new alignment; however, NY 68 continued to extend past the arterial to Ford Street as late as 1969. By the following year, NY 68 was truncated to the intersection of Canton and State Streets, eliminating an overlap with NY 87. NY 68 was truncated again in the mid-1970s to end at its junction with NY 37 southeast of the city center.

The section of NY 68 between the intersection with NY 310 and US 11 in Canton and CR 29 in Pierrepont was offered by the state to St. Lawrence County in 1966 that they would turn over this 8-mile (13 km) section and take over the alignments of Park Street in Canton, CR 27 and CR 29, a 10-mile (16 km) alignment. In March 1967, the New York State Senate approved a bill to swap maintenance of the two roads. That April, Governor of New York Nelson Rockefeller signed the bill to transfer roads, with NY 68 being designated as a less desirable alignment. By 1969, this changeover had never occurred, as NY 68 remained on the shorter alignment.

On September 1, 1982, ownership and maintenance of the portion of NY 68 between the hamlet of Pierrepont and NY 56 in Colton was transferred from St. Lawrence County to the state of New York as part of a highway maintenance swap between the two levels of government. Also exchanged in the swap was the portion of former NY 37 between the western end of the Ogdensburg bypass and the Ogdensburg city line, which had been county maintained prior to this point. Following the swap, NY 68 was re-extended into Ogdensburg, following its former alignment as well as that of NY 37 north and west to its current terminus west of Ogdensburg.

== Major intersections ==
The entire route is in St. Lawrence County.

Location	mi	km	Destinations	Notes
Oswegatchie	0.00	0.00	NY 37 – Massena, Watertown	Western terminus
Ogdensburg	2.35	3.78	State Street ( NY 970E)	Northern terminus of unsigned NY 970E
Oswegatchie	2.95	4.75	NY 37 / NY 812 – Bridge to Canada	
Town of Canton	15.02	24.17	CR 14 – Morley	Former eastern terminus of NY 186
Village of Canton	19.93	32.07	US 11 south – Gouverneur	Western terminus of US 11 / NY 68 overlap
Village of Canton	21.32	34.31	US 11 north / NY 310 north – Potsdam	Eastern terminus of US 11 / NY 68 overlap; southern terminus of NY 310
Colton	33.43	53.80	NY 56 – South Colton, Potsdam	Eastern terminus, hamlet of Colton
1.000 mi = 1.609 km; 1.000 km = 0.621 mi: Concurrency terminus
