= South Colton Reservoir =

- Location within New York South Colton Reservoir (the United States)
- Location: St. Lawrence County, New York, United States
- Coordinates: 44°31′31″N 74°52′01″W
- Type: Reservoir
- Primary inflows: Raquette River, Dead Creek, Harvey Brook
- Primary outflows: Raquette River
- Basin countries: United States
- Surface area: 226 acres (0.91 km^{2})
- Average depth: 15 feet (4.6 m)
- Max. depth: 47 feet (14 m)
- Shore length^{1}: 5.6 miles (9.0 km)
- Surface elevation: 974 feet (297 m)
- Islands: 5
- Settlements: South Colton, New York
- ^{1} Shore length is not a well-defined measure.

South Colton Reservoir is a man-made lake located on the Raquette River at South Colton, New York. Fish species present in the reservoir are smallmouth bass, white sucker, northern pike, yellow perch, rock bass, and walleye. There is a boat launch located on the southwest shore off Three Falls Lane and a carry down launch on the north shore on Morgan Road.
