= Charles W. Dolloff =

- Born: May 10, 1844; Parishville, New York
- Died: August 2, 1884 (aged 40)
- Burial place: Forest Cemetery, Stevens Point, Wisconsin
- Military career
- Allegiance: United States of America
- Branch: United States Army
- Rank: Corporal
- Unit: 1st Vermont Volunteer Infantry Regiment - Company K
- Conflicts: Third Battle of Petersburg
- Awards: Medal of Honor

Charles W. Dolloff (May 10, 1844 – August 2, 1884) was an American soldier who fought in the American Civil War. Dolloff received the United States' highest award for bravery during combat, the Medal of Honor, for his action during the Third Battle of Petersburg in Virginia on April 2, 1865. He was honored with the award on April 24, 1865.

== Biography ==
Dolloff was born in Parishville, New York, on May 10, 1844. He enlisted into the 1st Vermont Infantry. He died on August 2, 1884, and his remains are interred at Forest Cemetery in Stevens Point, Wisconsin.

== Medal of Honor citation ==
Capture of flag.

== See also ==
- List of American Civil War Medal of Honor recipients: A–F
