= Luke Brown House =

Historic house in New York, United States

- U.S. National Register of Historic Places
- Location within New York Location within the United States
- Location: 831 NY 72; Parishville, New York, U.S.
- Coordinates: 44°37′45″N 74°54′8″W
- Area: 2 acres (0.81 ha)
- Built: 1823
- Architectural style: Federal
- MPS: Red Potsdam Sandstone Resources Taken from Raquette River Quarries MPS
- NRHP reference No.: 03000030
- Added to NRHP: June 6, 2003

Luke Brown House is a historic home located at Parishville in St. Lawrence County, New York. It was built in 1823 and is a 2-story, five-by-three-bay, side-gabled Federal-style residence constructed of red Potsdam Sandstone. Attached is a 1 1/2-story side frame wing built about 1870.

It was listed on the National Register of Historic Places in 2003.
