= Church Pond =

- Location within New York Church Pond (the United States)
- Location: St. Lawrence County, New York, United States
- Coordinates: 44°22′42″N 74°46′12″W
- Type: Lake
- Primary outflows: North Branch Grass River
- Basin countries: United States
- Surface area: 21 acres (0.085 km^{2})
- Max. depth: 9 feet (2.7 m)
- Shore length^{1}: 1.6 miles (2.6 km)
- Surface elevation: 1,555 feet (474 m)
- Islands: 7
- Settlements: Stark, New York
- ^{1} Shore length is not a well-defined measure.

Church Pond is a small lake located south of Stark. Church Pond is the source of the North Branch Grass River. Fish species present in the lake are brook trout and black bullhead. There are 350 to 400 brook trout stocked per year. Access via state trail off state route 56 on the north shore.
