= Raymondville, New York =

- Hamlet
- Location within New York Location within the United States
- Coordinates: 44°50′17″N 74°58′41″W
- Country: United States
- State: New York
- County: St. Lawrence
- Elevation: 253 ft (77 m)
- Time zone: UTC-5 (Eastern (EST))
  - Summer (DST): UTC-4 (EDT)
- ZIP code: 13678
- Area codes: 315 & 680
- GNIS feature ID: 976877

Raymondville is a hamlet in St. Lawrence County, New York, United States. The community is located along the Raquette River and New York State Route 56, 6 miles (9.7 km) north of Norwood. Raymondville has a post office with ZIP code 13678.
