= New York State Snowmobile Association =

The New York State Snowmobile Association (NYSSA) is a non-profit organization that was organized in 1975 as the NY Snowmobile Coordinating Group. The NYSSA oversees the 232 snowmobile clubs that organize members and steward the approximately 10,500 miles (16,900 km) of trail around the state of New York. NYSSA’s operations are governed by a board of directors selected by the individual clubs in each of the 40 districts around the state. NYSSA continues to be the largest snowmobile association in the world. Membership in an individual club has many benefits that include automatically being a member of NYSSA, a $70 discount on snowmobile registrations, as well as supporting maintenance of trails in New York State.

== See also ==
- List of snowmobile trails in New York (state)
