= Stark Falls Reservoir =

New York lake

- Location within New York Stark Falls Reservoir (the United States)
- Location: St. Lawrence County, New York, United States
- Coordinates: 44°26′38″N 74°44′58″W
- Type: Reservoir
- Primary inflows: Raquette River
- Primary outflows: Raquette River
- Basin countries: United States
- Surface area: 644 acres (2.61 km^{2})
- Average depth: 24 feet (7.3 m)
- Max. depth: 52 feet (16 m)
- Shore length^{1}: 9.3 miles (15.0 km)
- Surface elevation: 1,355 feet (413 m)
- Islands: 10
- Settlements: Stark, New York
- ^{1} Shore length is not a well-defined measure.

Stark Falls Reservoir is a man-made lake on the Raquette River located near Stark, New York. Fish species present in the reservoir are smallmouth bass, largemouth bass, northern pike, yellow perch, black bullhead, tiger muskellunge, rock bass, and walleye. There is a hard ramp boat launch located on the southeast shore.
