= Sunday Rock =

- U.S. National Register of Historic Places
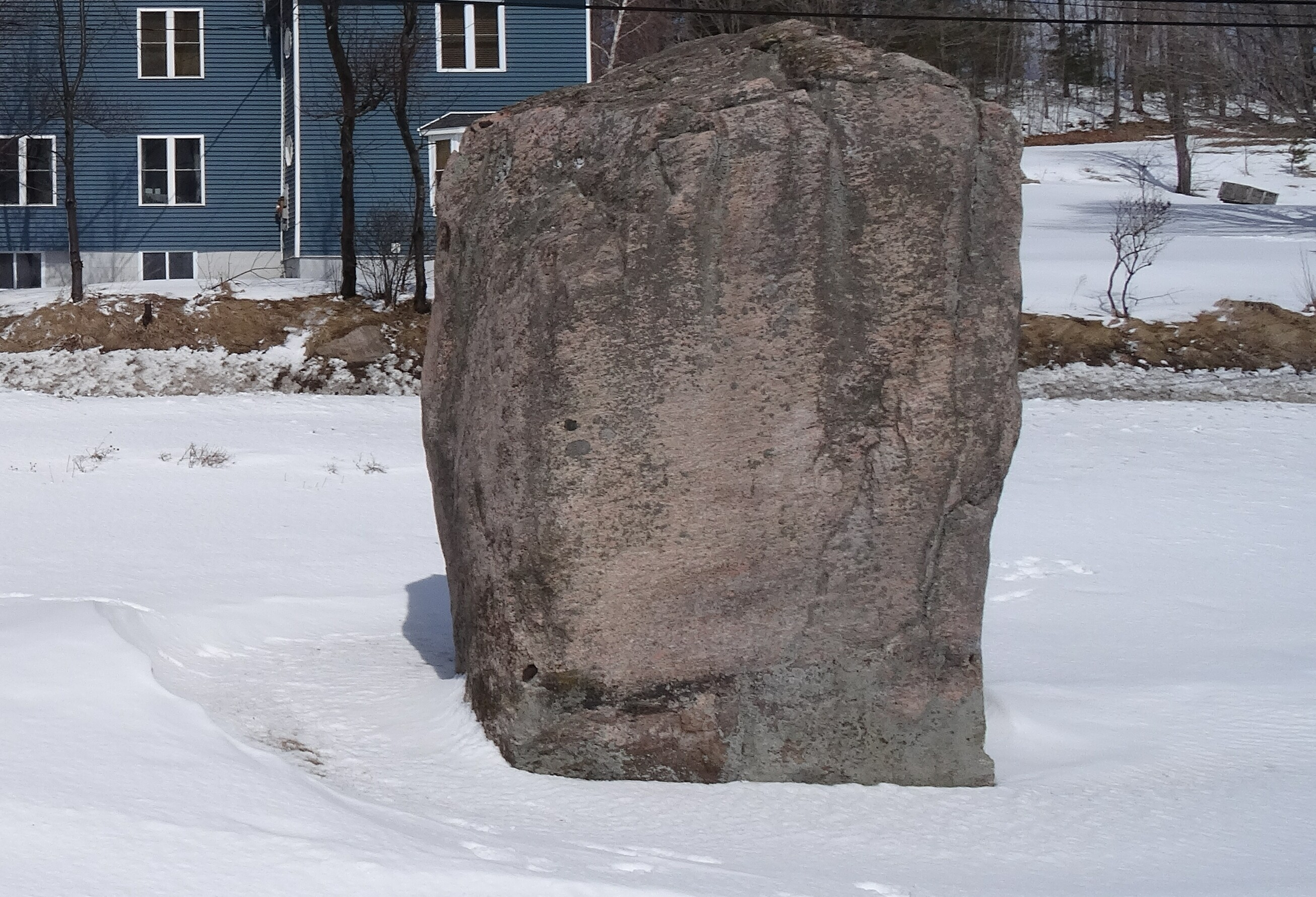
- Sunday Rock in 2014

- Location within New York Location within the United States
- Location: NY 56, South Colton, New York
- Coordinates: 44.509722°N 74.894167°W
- Area: 0.34 acres (0.14 ha)
- NRHP reference No.: 10000990
- Added to NRHP: December 7, 2010

Sunday Rock is a historic natural feature located in South Colton in St. Lawrence County, New York. It is an oblong glacial erratic measuring 11 feet high and weighing 64,000 pounds. It was moved in 1925 to make way for a highway and moved again in 1965, when the highway was widened. It is located in a public roadside park, with two concrete monuments to commemorate its moves and the organizations that arranged for them.

It was listed on the National Register of Historic Places in 2010.

== Gallery ==
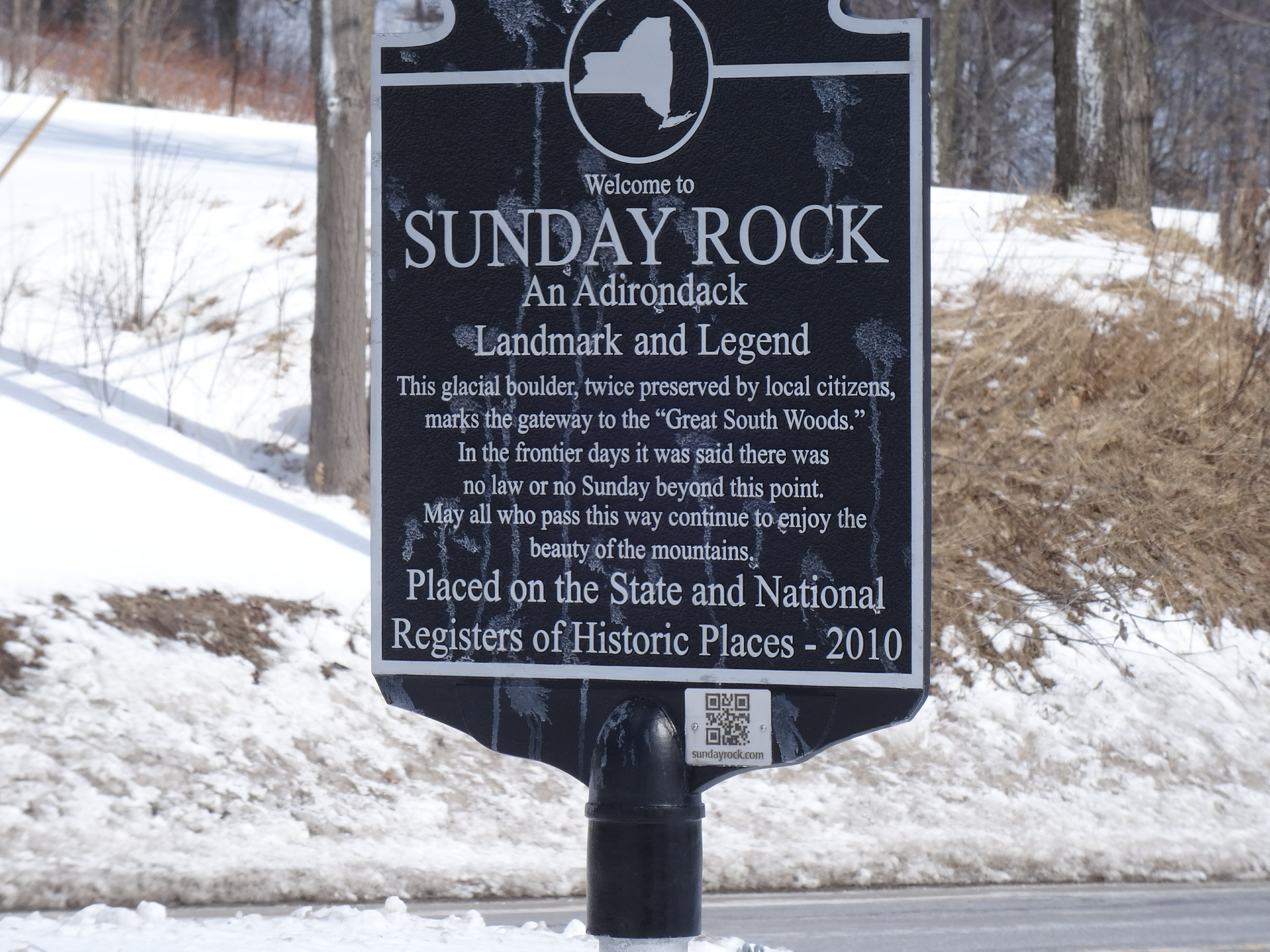
Marker at the site

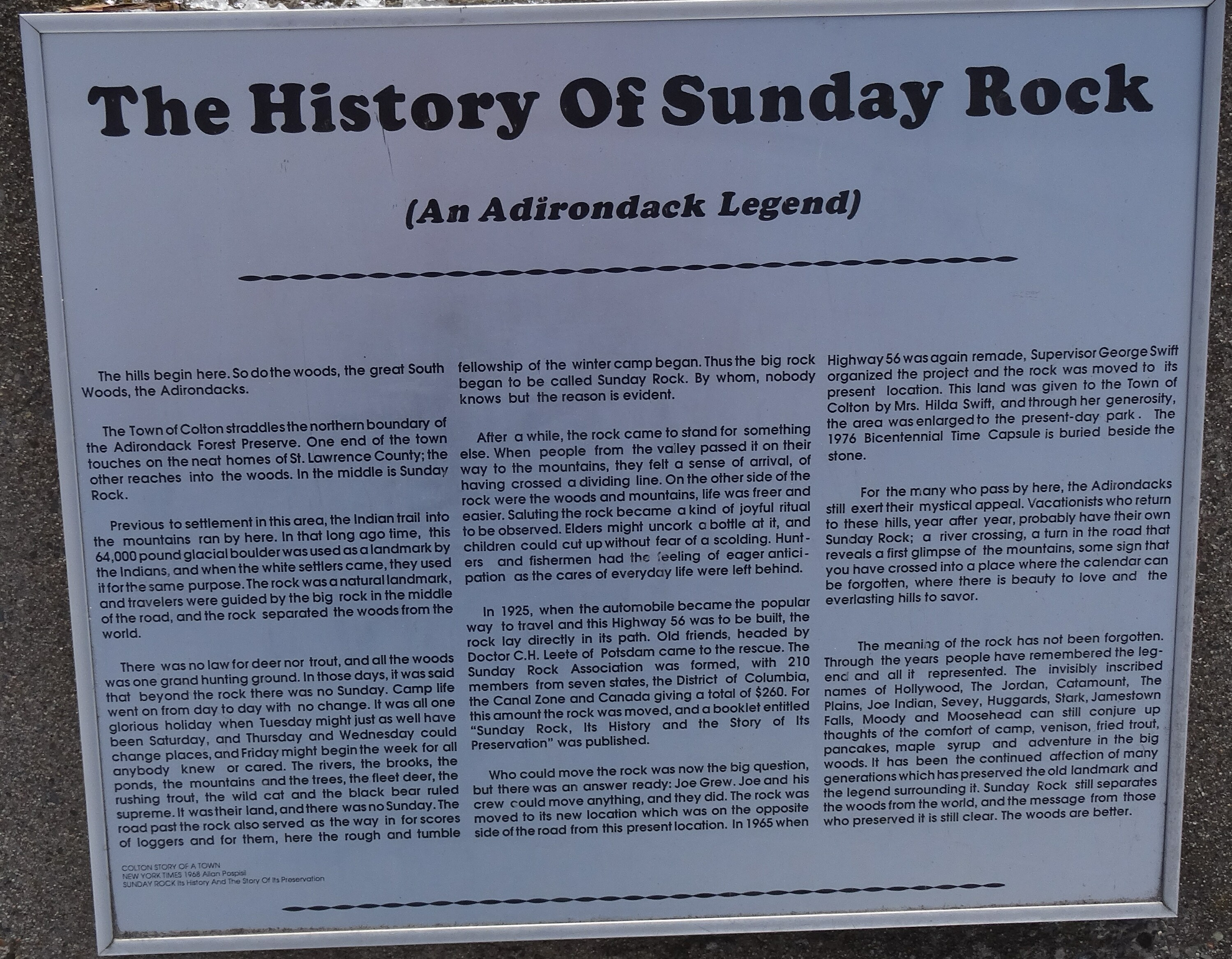
History of Sunday Rock

== See also ==
- List of individual rocks
