= Higley Flow State Park =

State park in St. Lawrence County, New York

- Location within New York
- Type: State park
- Location: 442 Cold Brook Drive; Colton, New York
- Nearest city: Potsdam, New York
- Coordinates: 44°29′31″N 74°54′54″W
- Area: 1,115 acres (4.51 km^{2})
- Created: 1936
- Operator: New York State Office of Parks, Recreation and Historic Preservation
- Visitors: 46,564 (in 2014)
- Open: All year
- Website: Higley Flow State Park

Higley Flow State Park is a 1,115-acre (4.51 km^{2}) state park located in the town of Colton in St. Lawrence County, New York, United States. The park is located on Higley Flow and Warm Creek Flow, both of which were formed by the impoundment of the Raquette River.

== Park description ==
Higley Flow State Park offers a sandy beach on Higley Flow with shower facilities and a lifeguard, picnic tables and pavilions, a playground, hiking, a nature trail, recreation programs, a boat launch, fishing, a campground with tent and trailer sites, and seasonal deer hunting. In the winter, volunteers help convert and maintain over 10 miles (16 km) of trails for snowmobiling, cross-country skiing, and snowshoeing.

The Higley Trails Lodge opened in January 2014 after being constructed using a $60,000 grant from the North Country Regional Economic Development Council. The building includes a large gathering space and heated bathrooms.

A severe ice storm in December 2013 forced the temporary closure of the park while crews removed downed limbs, trees and debris. A similar, slightly more damaging storm also impacted the park in 1998.

== Friends of Higley Flow State Park ==
A not-for-profit organization, the Friends of Higley Flow State Park provides public awareness regarding the park and its activities. The Friends organization sponsors a variety of events including the Rod Thomas Memorial Higley Hustle Ski Races.

== See also ==
- List of New York state parks
