= Zion Episcopal Church and Rectory (Colton, New York) =

Historic church in New York, United States

- U.S. National Register of Historic Places
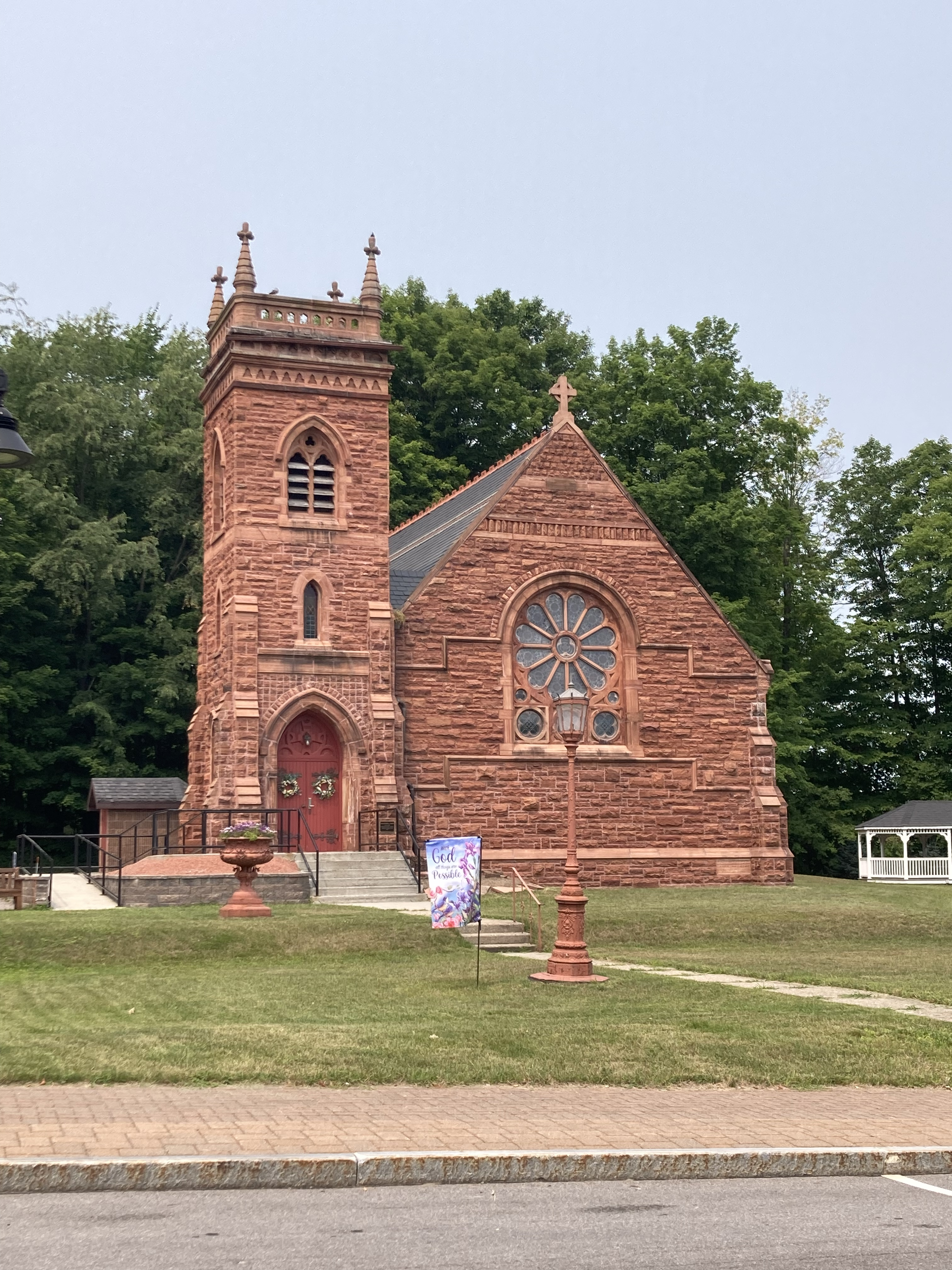
- The church photographed in 2025.

- Location within New York Location within the United States
- Location: 91 and 95 Main St., Colton, New York
- Coordinates: 44°33′13″N 74°56′22″W
- Area: less than one acre
- Built: 1883
- Architect: Johnson, James P.
- Architectural style: Gothic
- MPS: Red Potsdam Sandstone Resources Taken from Raquette River Quarries MPS
- NRHP reference No.: 03000029
- Added to NRHP: June 6, 2003

Zion Episcopal Church and Rectory is a historic Episcopal church complex located at Colton in St. Lawrence County, New York. The church was built in 1883 of red Potsdam Sandstone. It is a gable front building, approximately 48 feet (15 m) wide and 80 feet (24 m) deep and features an 85-foot-tall (26 m), 14 1/2-foot-square (4.4 m) tower. The rectory was built about 1900 and is a two-story, clapboard-sided Italianate building on a sandstone foundation. It is now used as the Colton Town Museum. Also on the property is a cast-iron urn a cast-iron lamppost dating to the 1880s.

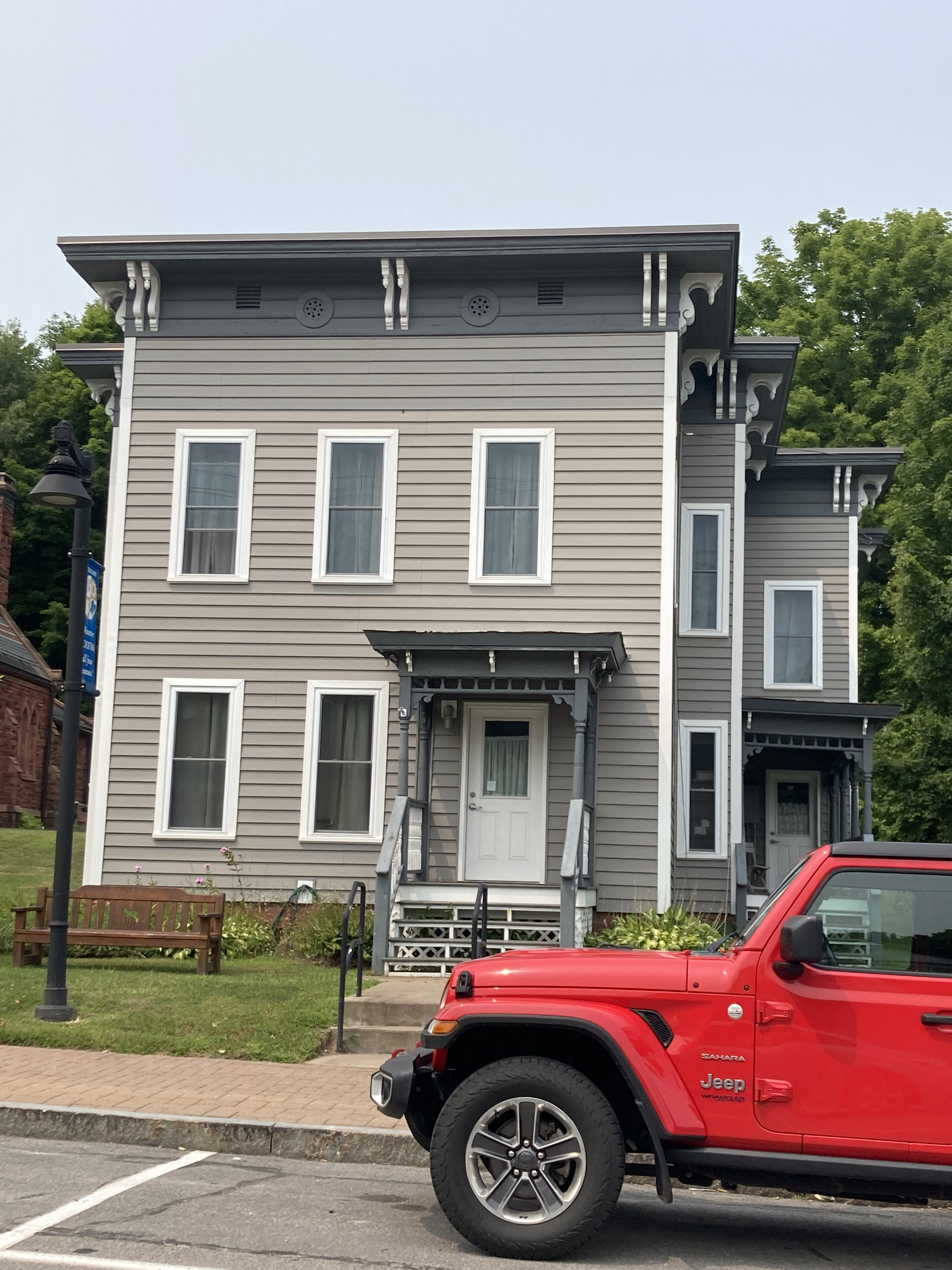
The 1900 rectory, now a museum.

It was listed on the National Register of Historic Places in 2003.
