= Calvin H. Robbins =

American politician (1840–1900)

Calvin Hubbard Robbins (December 20, 1840 – February 28, 1900) was an American physician and politicians.

Robbins was born in Norfolk, St. Lawrence County, New York. He went to medical school in Keokuk, Iowa and studied medicine in Chatfield, Minnesota and Ann Arbor, Michigan. Robbins moved to Minnesota in 1859 and settled in Wykoff, Fillmore County, Minnesota with his wife and family. Robbins served in the Minnesota House of Representatives in 1876. He died in Austin, Minnesota.
