= Hepburn Library of Colton =

- U.S. National Register of Historic Places
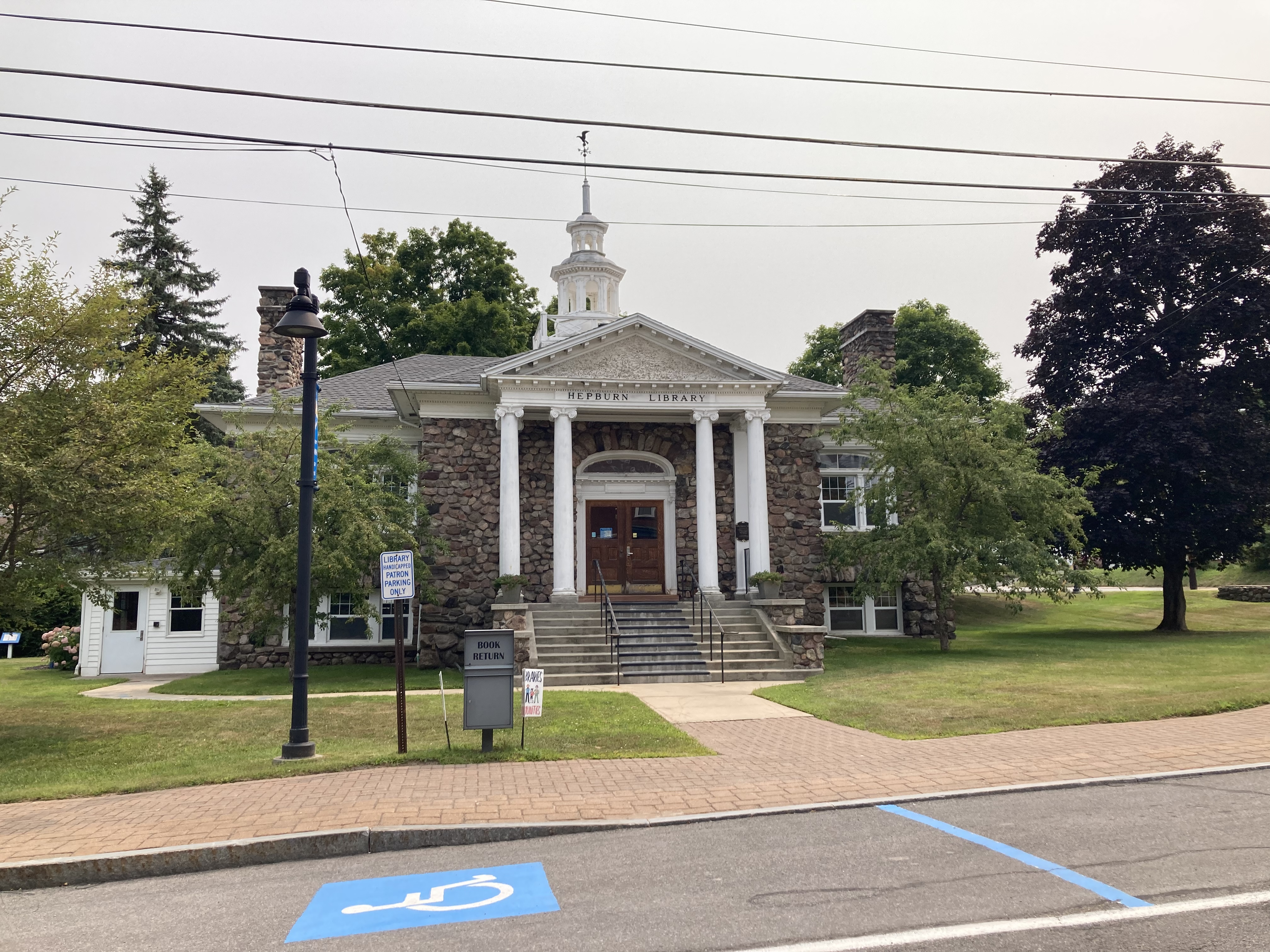

- Location within New York Location within the United States
- Location: 84 Main St., Colton, New York
- Coordinates: 44°33′11″N 74°56′20″W
- Area: less than one acre
- Built: 1912-1913
- Built by: Proctor Manufacturing Company
- Architect: Rossiter, Ehrick K.
- Architectural style: Colonial Revival, Arts and Crafts
- NRHP reference No.: 12000287
- Added to NRHP: May 16, 2012

The Hepburn Library of Colton, also known as the Colton-Hepburn Library, is a historic library building located at Colton, St. Lawrence County, New York. It was designed by architect Ehrick Rossiter and built in 1912-1913 It is a one-story, cruciform plan, stone building with a hipped roof topped by a multi-staged wood cupola. It sits on a raised basement and features an entrance portico with four unfluted Ionic order columns. The building design reflects a combination of Arts and Crafts and Colonial Revival style architecture. Funding for the library was provided by A. Barton Hepburn (1846-1922).

It was listed on the National Register of Historic Places in 2012.
