= Carry Falls Reservoir =

- Location within New York Carry Falls Reservoir (the United States)
- Location: St. Lawrence County, New York, United States
- Coordinates: 44°24′25″N 74°43′59″W, 44°25′02″N 74°45′32″W, 44°21′21″N 74°43′25″W
- Type: Reservoir
- Primary inflows: Raquette River, Brandy Brook, Cold Brook, Little Cold Brook, Jordan River, Felton Brook
- Primary outflows: Raquette River
- Basin countries: United States
- Surface area: 3,074 acres (12.44 km^{2})
- Average depth: 18 feet (5.5 m)
- Max. depth: 50 feet (15 m)
- Shore length^{1}: 29 miles (47 km)
- Surface elevation: 1,384 feet (422 m)
- Islands: 5 Radio Island, Maple Island
- Settlements: Stark, New York
- ^{1} Shore length is not a well-defined measure.

Carry Falls Reservoir is a man-made lake on the Raquette River, located southeast of Stark, New York. Fish species present in the reservoir are smallmouth bass, northern pike, yellow perch, black bullhead, tiger muskellunge, rock bass, and walleye. There is a state owned hard ramp boat launch located on the southwest shore.
