= Horace Adolphus Taylor =

American politician

Member of the Wisconsin State Senate
- In office 1889

Personal details
- Born: May 24, 1837 Norfolk, New York, US
- Died: August 5, 1910 (aged 73) Washington, D.C., US
- Party: Republican
- Occupation: Politician, diplomat

Horace Adolphus Taylor, a.k.a. Hod Taylor (May 24, 1837 – August 5, 1910), was a member of the Wisconsin State Senate and Chairman of the Republican Party of Wisconsin.

== Biography ==
Taylor was born in Norfolk, New York, on May 24, 1837. He moved to River Falls, Wisconsin, in 1855. He founded the River Falls Journal with his brother Lute Taylor in 1857. In 1860, he moved to Hudson, Wisconsin, where he purchased the Hudson Chronicle. Taylor later moved again to Madison, Wisconsin, in 1890, where he purchased and edited the Wisconsin State Journal until 1901. He died on August 5, 1910, at his home in Washington, D.C.

== Political career ==
Taylor was a delegate to the Republican National Convention in 1876 and 1884 and was Chairman of the Republican Party of Wisconsin from 1883 to 1887. From 1881 to 1883, he had been U.S. Consul in Marseille, France. Taylor served in the State Senate in 1889. In the same year, he was appointed United States Assistant Secretary of the Treasury and remained in the position until 1906. He unsuccessfully campaigned for governor of Wisconsin in 1888 and 1896.
