= Norfolk (CDP), New York =

Norfolk, New York
- CDP
- Location within the state of New York
- Coordinates: 44°47′58″N 74°59′27″W
- Country: United States
- State: New York
- County: St. Lawrence
- Established: 51

Area
  - Total: 2.81 sq mi (7.29 km^{2})
  - Land: 2.70 sq mi (7.00 km^{2})
  - Water: 0.11 sq mi (0.29 km^{2})
- Elevation: 259 ft (79 m)

Population (2020)
  - Total: 1,238
  - Density: 458.1/sq mi (176.86/km^{2})
- Time zone: UTC-5 (EST)
  - Summer (DST): UTC-4 (EDT)
- FIPS code: 36-51319
- GNIS feature ID: 0976729

Norfolk is a hamlet (and census-designated place) in St. Lawrence County, New York, United States. The population was 1,010 at the 2023 census.

This community is in the Town of Norfolk.

== History ==
The community was first settled circa 1816.

== Geography ==
Norfolk is located at 44°47′57″N 74°59′27″W (44.79941, -74.990963).

According to the United States Census Bureau, the CDP has a total area of 2.8 square miles (7.2 km^{2}), of which 2.7 square miles (6.9 km^{2}) is land and 0.1 square mile (0.2 km^{2}) (3.25%) is water.

Norfolk is located on New York State Route 56 at the junction of County Roads 38, 38A, and 47.

The Raquette River flows through the middle of the village.

== Demographics ==
Historical population
Census	Pop.	Note	%±
2020	1,238		—
U.S. Decennial Census

As of the census of 2000, there were 1,334 people, 558 households, and 362 families residing in the CDP. The population density was 497.5 inhabitants per square mile (192.1/km^{2}). There were 610 housing units at an average density of 227.5 per square mile (87.8/km^{2}). The racial makeup of the CDP was 97.5% White, 0.01% Black or African American, 0.4% Native American, 0.8% Asian, 0.30% Pacific Islander, and 0.90% from two or more races, 1.0%Hispanic or Latino of the population.

There were 558 households, out of which 28.3% had children under the age of 18 living with them, 47.5% were married couples living together, 11.8% had a female householder with no husband present, and 35.1% were non-families. 29.4% of all households were made up of individuals, and 17.9% had someone living alone who was 65 years of age or older. The average household size was 2.38 and the average family size was 2.90.

In the CDP, the population was spread out, with 23.9% under the age of 18, 8.2% from 18 to 24, 26.5% from 25 to 44, 22.5% from 45 to 64, and 18.9% who were 65 years of age or older. The median age was 39.5 years. For every 100 females, there were 94.2 males. For every 100 females age 18 and over, there were 88.7 males.

The median income for a household in the CDP was $24,722, and the median income for a family was $31,307. Males had a median income of $29,868 versus $14,961 for females. The per capita income for the CDP was $1,4,946. About 14.9% of families and 20.9% of the population were below the poverty line.

== Education ==
The school district is Norwood-Norfolk Central School District.
