= Pleasant Lake (Stratford, New York) =

Lake in Stratford, Fulton County, New York

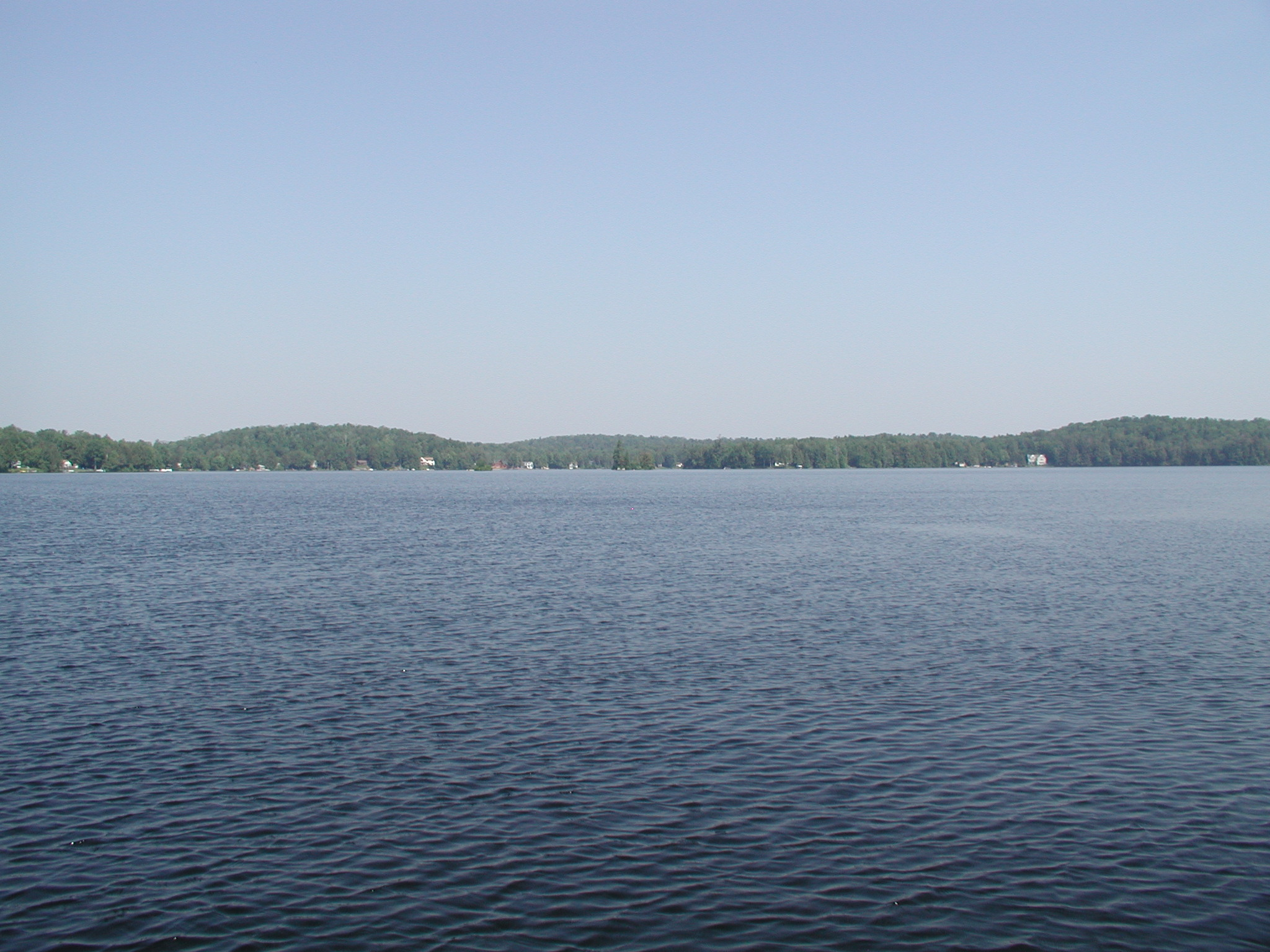
- View of West and North Shores from Southeast cove

- Location within New York Location within the United States
- Location: Fulton County, New York
- Coordinates: 43°11′18″N 74°36′01″W
- Basin countries: United States
- Surface area: 242 acres (98 ha)
- Surface elevation: 1,634 ft (498 m)

Pleasant Lake is a small private lake located in Stratford, Fulton County, New York in the southern Adirondack Park.
