= North Branch Grass River =

Location
- Country: United States
- State: New York

Physical characteristics
- Source: Church Pond
- Mouth: Grass River
  - location: Russell, New York
  - coordinates: 44°25′28″N 75°06′27″W
  - elevation: 620 ft (190 m)
- Basin size: 60.2 mi^{2} (156 km^{2})

Basin features
- Tributaries
  - left: Gulf Brook
  - right: La Rock Creek

The North Branch Grass River flows into the Grass River near Russell, New York.
