= Parishville, New York =

Parishville
- Town
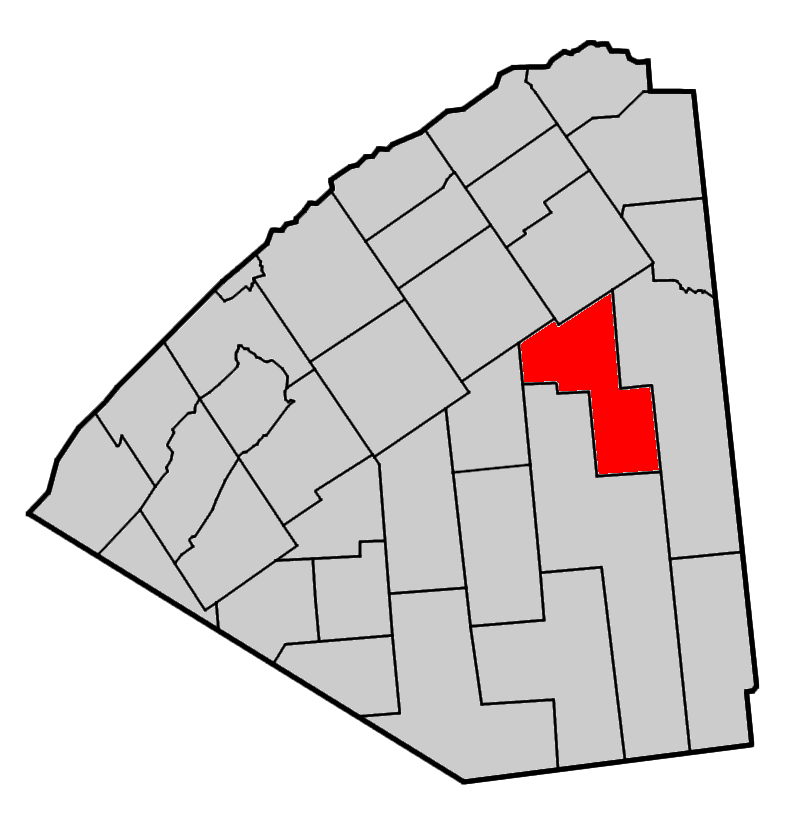
- Map highlighting Parishville's location within St. Lawrence County.

- Location within the state of New York
- Coordinates: 44°35′53″N 74°51′0″W
- Country: United States
- State: New York
- County: St. Lawrence

Area
  - Total: 101.43 sq mi (262.70 km^{2})
  - Land: 98.11 sq mi (254.11 km^{2})
  - Water: 3.32 sq mi (8.59 km^{2})
- Elevation: 1,102 ft (336 m)

Population (2020)
  - Total: 2,038
  - Density: 21.2/sq mi (8.18/km^{2})
- Time zone: UTC-5 (Eastern (EST))
  - Summer (DST): UTC-4 (EDT)
- FIPS code: 36-56374
- GNIS feature ID: 0979343
- Website: https://parishvilleny.gov/

Parishville is a town in the east-central part of St. Lawrence County, east of Potsdam, in the state of New York, United States. The population was 2,038 at the 2020 census.

== History ==
The town was laid out in 1809 on a tract of land that David Parish had purchased from J. D. Le Ray de Chaumont in 1808. The first settlers arrived around 1810.

The town was formed in 1814 from the town of Hopkinton. The town was named for David Parish. In 1843, part of Parishville was used to form the town of Colton.

The Luke Brown House was listed on the National Register of Historic Places in 2003.

== Geography ==
According to the United States Census Bureau, the town has a total area of 101.4 square miles (263 km^{2}), of which 98.2 square miles (254 km^{2}) is land and 3.2 square miles (8.3 km^{2}) (3.20%) is water.

The town is situated partly in the Adirondack Park.

The West Branch of the St. Regis River flows northward through the town. The Raquette River flows through the southern part of Parishville.

New York State Route 72 is an east–west highway in the northern part of the town. New York State Route 56 cuts across the southwestern corner of the town.

== Demographics ==
Historical population
Census	Pop.	Note	%±
1820	594		—
1830	1,479		149.0%
1840	2,250		52.1%
1850	2,132		−5.2%
1860	2,296		7.7%
1870	2,241		−2.4%
1880	2,384		6.4%
1890	2,272		−4.7%
1900	2,086		−8.2%
1910	1,785		−14.4%
1920	1,453		−18.6%
1930	1,284		−11.6%
1940	1,309		1.9%
1950	1,245		−4.9%
1960	1,473		18.3%
1970	1,631		10.7%
1980	1,951		19.6%
1990	1,901		−2.6%
2000	2,049		7.8%
2010	2,153		5.1%
2020	2,038		−5.3%

As of the census of 2000, there were 2,049 people, 797 households, and 564 families residing in the town. The population density was 20.9 inhabitants per square mile (8.1/km^{2}). There were 1,204 housing units at an average density of 12.3 per square mile (4.7/km^{2}). The racial makeup of the town was 98.98% White, 0.05% African American, 0.29% Native American, 0.15% Asian, 0.10% from other races, and 0.44% from two or more races. Hispanic or Latino of any race were 0.73% of the population.

There were 797 households, out of which 33.9% had children under the age of 18 living with them, 56.5% were married couples living together, 9.3% had a female householder with no husband present, and 29.2% were non-families. 23.3% of all households were made up of individuals, and 9.4% had someone living alone who was 65 years of age or older. The average household size was 2.57 and the average family size was 3.02.

In the town, the population was spread out, with 27.4% under the age of 18, 6.8% from 18 to 24, 29.1% from 25 to 44, 25.6% from 45 to 64, and 11.0% who were 65 years of age or older. The median age was 37 years. For every 100 females, there were 98.7 males. For every 100 females age 18 and over, there were 95.9 males.

The median income for a household in the town was $32,210, and the median income for a family was $37,981. Males had a median income of $30,842 versus $22,938 for females. The per capita income for the town was $14,924. About 6.1% of families and 10.7% of the population were below the poverty line, including 13.3% of those under age 18 and 7.9% of those age 65 or over.

== Communities and locations in Parishville ==
- Allens Falls – A location in the northern part of town and site of an early settlement.
- Hannawa Falls – A hamlet and census-designated place in the western part of the town. It is primarily located in Pierrepont.
- High Flats – A hamlet in the western part of town on County Road 58.
- Joe Indian Pond – A lake near the southern town line.
- Blake Falls Reservoir – An artificial lake by the southern town line.
- Parishville – A hamlet, with the same name as the town, on NY-72.
- Parishville Center – A hamlet west of Parishville hamlet on NY-72.
- Pickettville – A hamlet south of Parishville hamlet, located on the edge of the Adirondack Park.
- Rainbow Falls Reservoir – An artificial lake in the southwest part of Parishville.
- Sinclair Corners – A location north of Parishville Center.
- Stafford Corners – A location at the western town line, north of West Parishville.
- West Parishville – A hamlet near the western town line.

== In popular culture ==
The character Rose Lalonde in the webcomic Homestuck lives in a fictional house over Rainbow Falls in Parishville.
