= Colton (CDP), New York =

Colton, New York
- Census-designated place
- Location within New York Location within the United States
- Coordinates: 44°33′10″N 74°56′22″W
- Country: United States
- State: New York
- County: St. Lawrence
- Town: Colton

Area
  - Total: 1.76 sq mi (4.56 km^{2})
  - Land: 1.66 sq mi (4.29 km^{2})
  - Water: 0.10 sq mi (0.27 km^{2})
- Elevation: 864 ft (263 m)

Population (2020)
  - Total: 348
  - Density: 209.9/sq mi (81.04/km^{2})
- Time zone: UTC-5 (Eastern (EST))
  - Summer (DST): UTC-4 (EDT)
- ZIP Code: 13625
- Area codes: 315/680
- FIPS code: 36-17398
- GNIS feature ID: 2627943

Colton is the primary hamlet and a census-designated place (CDP) in the town of Colton in St. Lawrence County, New York, United States. As of the 2010 census, it had a population of 345, out of 1,451 in the entire town of Colton.

The community is in central St. Lawrence County, in the northwest corner of the town of Colton. It is bordered to the west by the town of Pierrepont and to the north by the town of Parishville. It sits on both sides of the Raquette River, which drops 40 feet (12 m) in elevation through the hamlet, on its way north to join the St. Lawrence River near the Canadian border.

New York State Route 56 runs through Colton, leading north 9 miles (14 km) to Potsdam and southeast 23 miles (37 km) to New York State Route 3 in the Adirondacks. State Route 68 leads west from Colton 13 miles (21 km) to Canton.

== Demographics ==
Historical population
Census	Pop.	Note	%±
2020	348		—
U.S. Decennial Census

== Education ==
The school district is Parishville-Hopkinton Central School District.
