= South Colton, New York =

South Colton
- Hamlet
- Location within New York Location within the United States
- Coordinates: 44°30′38″N 74°53′16″W
- Country: United States
- State: New York
- County: St. Lawrence
- Town: Colton
- Elevation: 935 ft (285 m)
- Time zone: UTC-5 (Eastern (EST))
  - Summer (DST): UTC-4 (EDT)
- ZIP code: 13687

South Colton, also referred to as Three Falls, is a hamlet located in the Town of Colton in St. Lawrence County, New York, on NY 56 by the crossing of the Raquette River. Located in South Colton is Sunday Rock, a historic glacial erratic. South Colton has a post office with ZIP code 13687, which opened on November 15, 1854.
