= Raquette River =

River in New York, United States

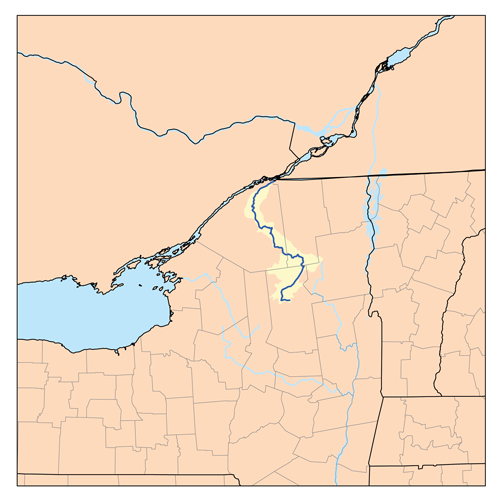

Location
- Country: United States
- State: New York

Physical characteristics
- Source: Raquette Lake
  - location: Raquette Lake, New York
- Mouth: Saint Lawrence River
  - location: Hogansburg, New York
  - coordinates: 44°59′35″N 74°41′17″W
  - elevation: 150 ft (46 m)
- Length: 146 mi (235 km)
- Basin size: 1,253 mi^{2} (3,250 km^{2})

The Raquette River, sometimes spelled Racquette, originates at Raquette Lake in the Adirondack Mountains in the U.S. state of New York. 146 miles (235 km) long, it is the third longest river entirely in the state of New York.

The river is a popular destination for canoeing and kayaking. It passes through many natural and man-made lakes to its final destination at Akwesasne on the Saint Lawrence River. The river is the source of 27 hydroelectric plants operated by Brookfield Power, which at capacity can produce up to 181 megawatts of power.

Historically, the river was a part of the "Highway of the Adirondacks", by which it was possible to travel hundreds of miles by canoe or guideboat with short stretches of portage connecting various waterways. This route is still followed by the Northern Forest Canoe Trail, a 740-mile (1,190 km) canoe trail from Old Forge to Fort Kent in Maine. It is also the basis of the route of the Adirondack Canoe Classic, a three-day, 90-mile canoe race from Old Forge to Saranac Lake.

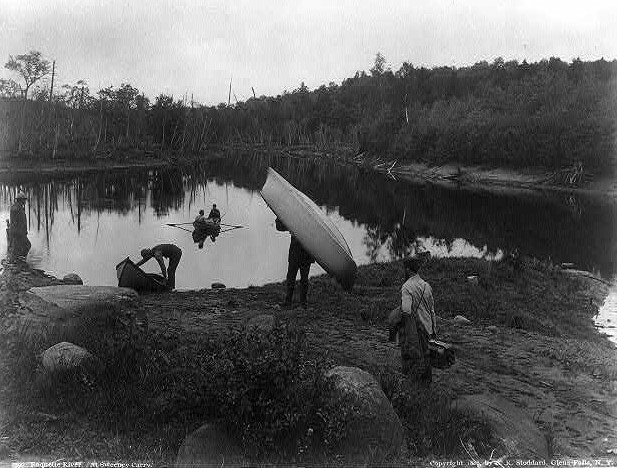
Raquette River at the Sweeney Carry, 1888. Photo by Seneca Ray Stoddard.

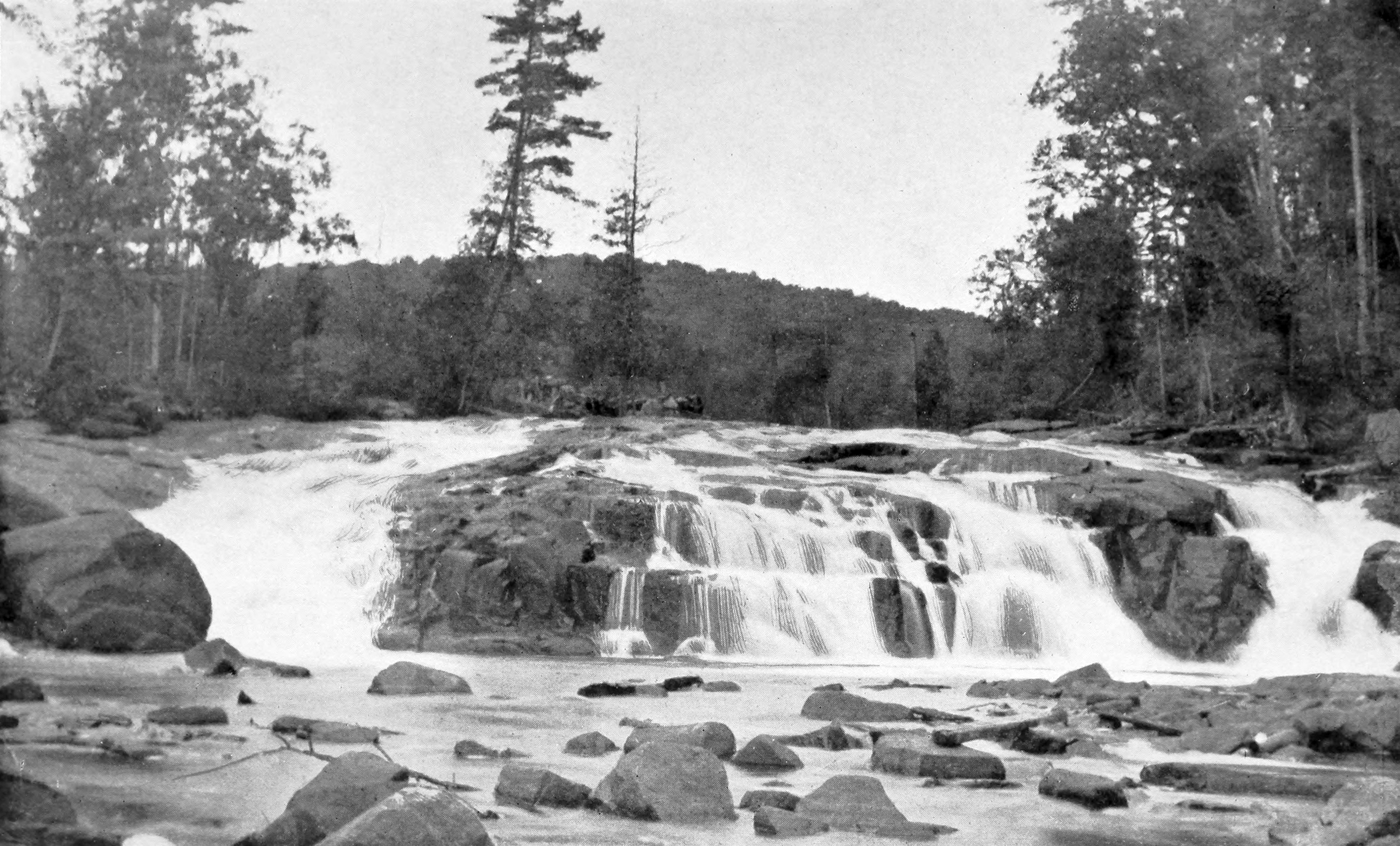
Buttermilk Falls in Hamilton County, 1914

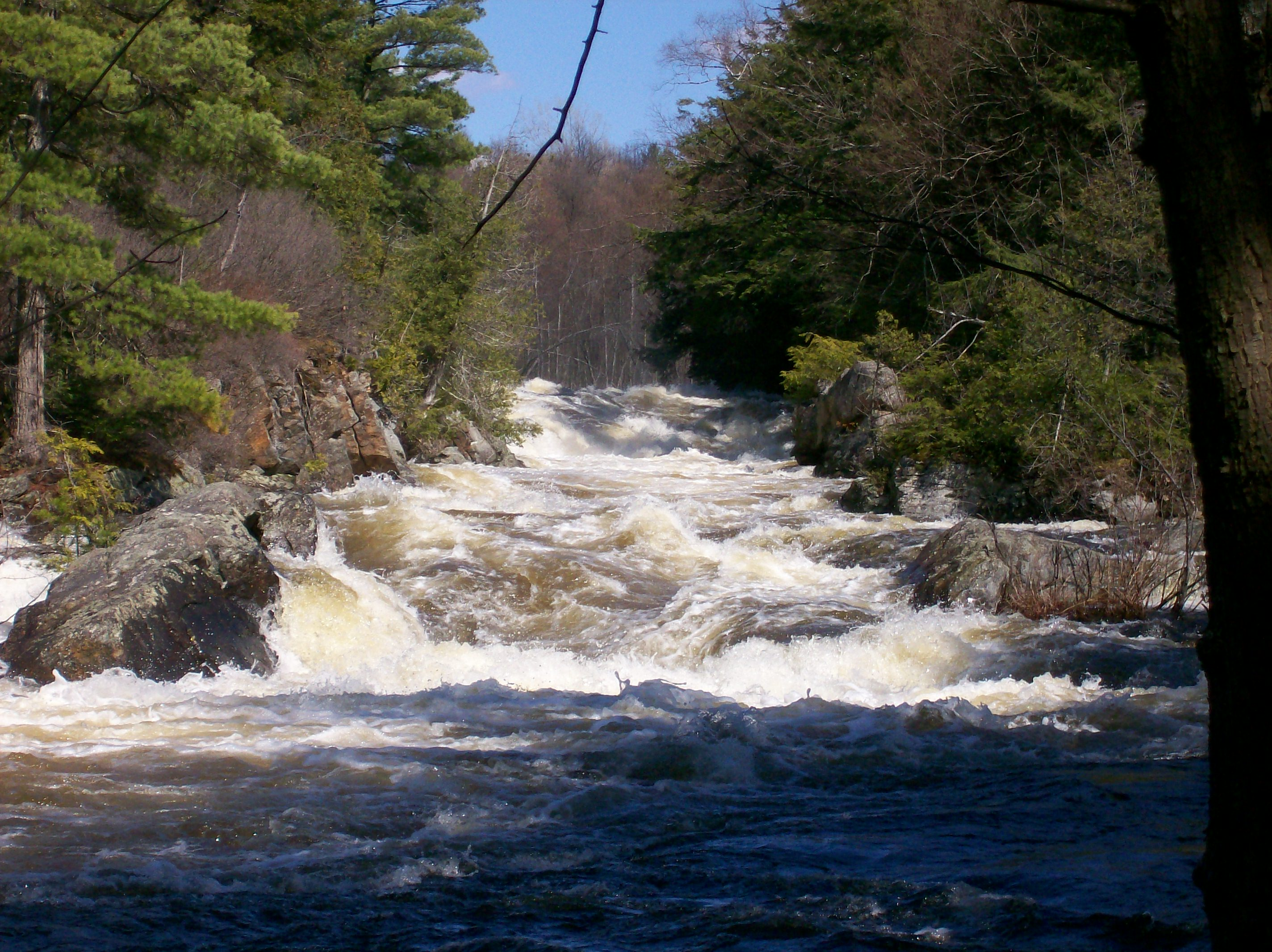
Raquette River in Colton, New York.

== Communities along the Raquette River ==
- Blue Mountain Lake, New York hamlet in the town of Indian Lake in Hamilton County
- Long Lake in Hamilton County
- Tupper Lake in Franklin County
- Colton in St. Lawrence County
- Hannawa Falls in St. Lawrence County
- Potsdam in St. Lawrence County
- Norwood in St. Lawrence County
- Norfolk in St. Lawrence County
- Massena in St. Lawrence County
- Mohawk Nation of Akwesasne (or St. Regis Mohawk Reservation) in Franklin County

== See also ==
- Five Falls Reservoir, a man-made lake located on the Raquette River
- List of New York rivers
