= Line Creek =

Line Creek may refer to:

== Streams ==
in the United States

- Line Creek (Flint River tributary), a stream in Georgia
- Line Creek (Missouri), a stream in Platte County, Missouri
- Line Creek (Grass River), a stream in New York
- Line Creek (Schoharie Creek tributary), New York
- Line Creek (Deep River tributary), a stream in Chatham County, North Carolina
- Line Creek (South Dakota), a stream in Perkins County, South Dakota
