= Riverdale Park (Bronx) =

Park in the Bronx, New York

- Location: Bronx, New York
- Coordinates: 40°53′45″N 73°55′00″W
- Elevation: 30 ft
- Status: Open

Riverdale Park is a park along the Hudson River in Riverdale, The Bronx, New York City. It is approximately 1.5 miles (2.4 km) long and one block wide. It averages 9 meters above sea level. It is located along Palisade Avenue and entered at Dodge Lane (247th Street). The northern border is 254th Street and the park extends as far south as 232nd Street. It is adjacent to the grounds of Wave Hill.

The main sections of the park, from north to south, are The North Woods, The Fishing Trail, Dodge Lane, The Oak Forest (from which it is divided from the Dodge Lane area by a swath of private land), and the South End.

It abuts Wave Hill.

== The North Woods ==
The North Woods includes historic ruins, including a stone oven. About 25 yards from it is a fruit storage shed built by Robert Colgate in 1877 that was modified into a tool shed by Darwin Kingsley in 1923. Among the plants in the North Woods are black locust, porcelain berry, bloodroot, red oak, Norway maple, amur honeysuckle, viburnum, smooth sumac, raspberry, multiflora rose, jack-in-the-pulpit, mayapple, and violet.

== The Fishing Trail ==
The Fishing Trail is surmised to be the most-used trail in the park. It leads to a fishing area where one can catch bluefish, eel, flounder, striped bass, and white perch. There is a small stream here called Alder Brook, which was larger prior to road and rail construction. From here one can see the Palisade Cliffs on the other side of the river. Phragmites, willow, and ostrich fern remain from an area that was once a marsh.

== Dodge Lane ==
The Dodge Lane area includes large maples and hickories, white pines, wisteria, sycamore, wild grape, and porcelain berry. and stone-crafted drainage culverts. There used to be a Canal Street Ferry Toll House, later called the Canal House, which burned down in the early 1960s. It was moved up the Hudson by Major Joseph Delafield around 1830. It was used as a house by a quarry superintendent and then by Dodge family gardener, then a YWCA clubhouse. It burned down in the early 1960s. the Dodge Lane area ends with an abrupt slab that was once part of a footbridge leading to the rail line.

== The Oak Forest ==
Populated mainly with red oak and black oak, but also with pin oak, American chestnut, sassafras, maple-leaved viburnum, day-lily, and black birch, The Oak Forest is home to ring-necked pheasants, blue jay, herring gull, black-backed gull, and double-crested cormorant. The area used to be used as a horse pasture, and in more recent years has been maintained by low-intensity fires. There is a steep slope here that was once much smoother. The erosion, a direct consequence of the railroad, has led to significant root exposure.

== The South End ==
The South End is populated with Queen Anne's lace, mugwort, Eastern cottonwood, black locust, red oak, black oak, tulip poplar, black cherry, maple, mulberry, viburnum, sassafras, and witch hazel. The area was once used as a sheep pasture. Rounded stones suggest that the soil was impacted by Pleistocene Epoch glaciers, whereas the soil in the North Woods is finer, sandier, and with more particles of clay covering layers of Inwood marble and Manhattan schist. The soil in this area has been the most drastically altered by human influence, including garbage, cinders, fill dirt, and construction debris. Also in this area is a lime kiln dating back to the 1700s. The kiln was used to superheat Inwood marble that produced mortar used in the battlements at the entrance to New York Harbor. This kiln was considered for landmark preservation status.

== History ==
Riverdale Park was originally planned as the centerpiece of an idealized neighborhood, but this never developed beyond the planning stages. In 1868, it was a small neighborhood park consisting mainly of the South End. The other areas were owned by the Delafield, Dodge, Douglas, and Perkins families, who donated the land to the New York City in the 1940s with the provision that it be kept in its natural state. It was established by the city in the 1950s as one of three "special natural areas" in the city. A fence was added in the 1960s. Wave Hill also established a Wave Hill Learning Center in 1981. The Riverdale Park Project was begun by Wave Hill in 1983 because the park had been unmanaged since the 1960s. They began teaching eight Bronx teenagers forest management and ecology as part of paid employment at the park. In 1984, they developed a Natural Sciences Program. It offers assistance to the New York City Department of Parks and Recreation. Also in 1984, Ian McCarg, Chairman of the Department of Landscape Agriculture at the University of Pennsylvania, received a contract from the city to restore the park to improve issues of soil erosion and non-native plant species to restore it to its natural woodland state.
