= Middle Branch Grass River =

Location
- Country: United States
- State: New York

Physical characteristics
- Source: Pleasant Lake Stream, Blue Mountain Stream
- Mouth: Grass River
  - location: Clare, New York
  - coordinates: 44°22′33″N 75°03′39″W
  - elevation: 799 ft (244 m)
- Basin size: 63 mi^{2} (160 km^{2})

Basin features
- Tributaries
  - left: Tracy Brook
  - right: Deerskin Creek, Mud Brook, Bear Creek, Alder Brook

The Middle Branch Grass River flows into the Grass River in Clare, New York. The Middle Branch Grass River and South Branch Grass River combine together here and become the Grass River.
