= Bear Creek (Middle Branch Grass River tributary) =

River tributary in New York

Location
- Country: United States
- State: New York

Physical characteristics
- Mouth: Middle Branch Grass River
  - location: Degrasse, New York
  - coordinates: 44°23′00″N 75°00′19″W
  - elevation: 947 ft (289 m)
- Basin size: 6.44 mi^{2} (16.7 km^{2})

Bear Creek flows into the Middle Branch Grass River near Degrasse, New York.
