= Allen Pond =

Allen Pond may refer to:

- Allen Pond Outlet, a tributary of the South Branch Grass River in New York, US
- Allen Pond Park, a park in Bowie, Maryland, US
- Allen Bartlitt Pond, American architect, co-founder of the firm Pond and Pond
