= South Branch Grass River =

Location
- Country: United States
- State: New York

Physical characteristics
- Mouth: Grass River
  - location: Clare, New York
  - coordinates: 44°22′48″N 75°04′30″W
  - elevation: 779 ft (237 m)
- Basin size: 138 mi^{2} (360 km^{2})

The South Branch Grass River flows into the Grass River in Clare, New York. The South Branch Grass River and Middle Branch Grass River combine here and become Grass River.

== Tributaries ==
Right
Jocks Pond Outlet
Mink Brook
Dead Creek
Irish Brook
Twin Ponds Outlet
Second Brook
First Brook
Allen Pond Outlet
Allen Brook
Randall Brook
Colton Creek

Left
Burntbridge Outlet
Roaring Brook
Silver Brook
Cook Pond Outlet
Moosehead Pond Outlet
Bend Brook
Steep Bank Brook
