= Plumb Brook =

Location
- Country: United States
- State: New York

Physical characteristics
- Mouth: Grass River
  - location: Russell, New York
  - coordinates: 44°25′30″N 75°08′02″W
  - elevation: 571 ft (174 m)
- Basin size: 35.3 mi^{2} (91 km^{2})

The Plumb Brook flows into the Grass River in Russell, New York.
