= Blue Mountain Stream =

Location
- Country: United States
- State: New York

Physical characteristics
- Mouth: Middle Branch Grass River
  - location: Newbridge, New York
  - coordinates: 44°21′27″N 74°55′13″W
  - elevation: 1,222 ft (372 m)
- Basin size: 14.2 mi^{2} (37 km^{2})

Blue Mountain Stream flows into the Middle Branch Grass River near Newbridge, New York. The Blue Mountain Stream and Pleasant Lake Stream combine here to become Middle Branch Grass River.
