= Wave Hill =

Historic house in the Bronx, New York

- U.S. National Register of Historic Places
- New York City Landmark
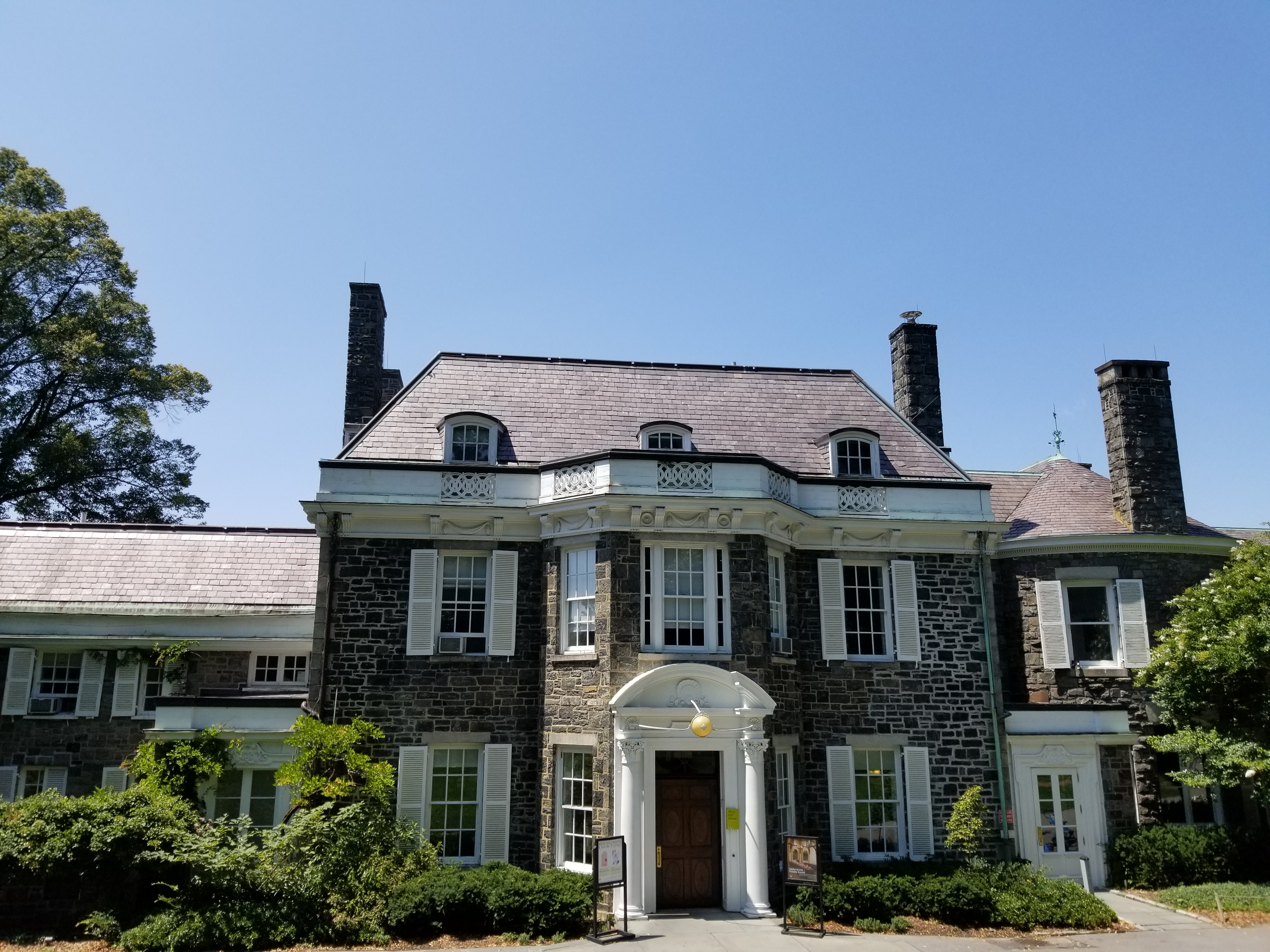
- Wave Hill House

- Location within New York City Location within New York Location within the United States
- Location: West 249th Street and Independence Avenue
- Coordinates: 40°53′55″N 73°54′47″W
- Area: 20.9 acres (8.5 ha)
- Built: 1843
- Architect: Multiple
- Architectural style: Colonial Revival, Greek Revival
- NRHP reference No.: 83001646
- NYCL No.: 0131

Significant dates
- Added to NRHP: September 9, 1983
- Designated NYCL: June 21, 1966

Wave Hill is a 28-acre (11 ha) estate in the Hudson Hill section of Riverdale in the Bronx, New York City. Wave Hill currently consists of public horticultural gardens and a cultural center, all situated on the slopes overlooking the Hudson River, with expansive views across the river to the New Jersey Palisades. The estate includes two houses and a botanical garden. The oldest part of the main house, Wave Hill House, dates to 1843; Glyndor House dates from 1927 and contains a multi-room art gallery. Perkins Visitor Center, which was originally a garage, contains a gift shop and an information desk.

During the late 19th century and early 20th century, numerous highly notable people resided in Wave Hill, either because they owned it, leased it, or stayed there as guests. In 1960, the estate was given to the City of New York, and Wave Hill is now a cultural center as well as a garden. In addition to visual arts exhibits, paid-ticket concert series take place on some Sunday afternoons in Armor Hall. Wave Hill is listed on the National Register of Historic Places and is a New York City designated landmark.

== History ==
The original Wave Hill House was a gray fieldstone mansion built in 1843 by lawyer William Lewis Morris. It was owned from 1866 to 1903 by publisher William Henry Appleton, who enlarged the house in between 1866 and 1869 and again in 1890, and added greenhouses and gardens to the grounds. During these years, the house was visited by Thomas Henry Huxley, who helped Charles Darwin bring evolution by natural selection to the public's attention. Theodore Roosevelt's family rented Wave Hill during the summers of 1870 and 1871, and Mark Twain leased it from 1901 to 1903.

The house was purchased in 1903 by George Walbridge Perkins, a partner of J. P. Morgan, along with adjacent property, including Glyndor, a house built by the Harriman family in 1888, which later burned down and was rebuilt in 1927. In 1910, Perkins added an underground building for recreation which included a bowling alley. Perkins performed extensive landscaping on the site and leased Wave Hill House to an eminent ichthyologist, Bashford Dean of the American Museum of Natural History, who built a stone addition to the building as a private museum, Armor Hall.

Other famous residents of the estate included the conductor Arturo Toscanini (1942–1945) and chief members of the British Delegation to the United Nations (1950–1956). In 1960, at the suggestion of Robert Moses, the Perkins-Freeman family deeded Wave Hill to the City of New York. In 1983, the estate was added to the roster of the National Register of Historic Places. Before 1987, the estate was known as Perkins Garden. During that year Parks Commissioner Henry Stern renamed it Wave Hill.

In 2005, Wave Hill was among 406 New York City arts and social service institutions to receive part of a $20 million grant from the Carnegie Corporation, which was made possible through a donation by New York City mayor Michael Bloomberg.

On an annual basis, about 65,000 people visit Wave Hill, making it one of the most popular sites in Riverdale.

== Gardens, Notable trees, or Landscape ==
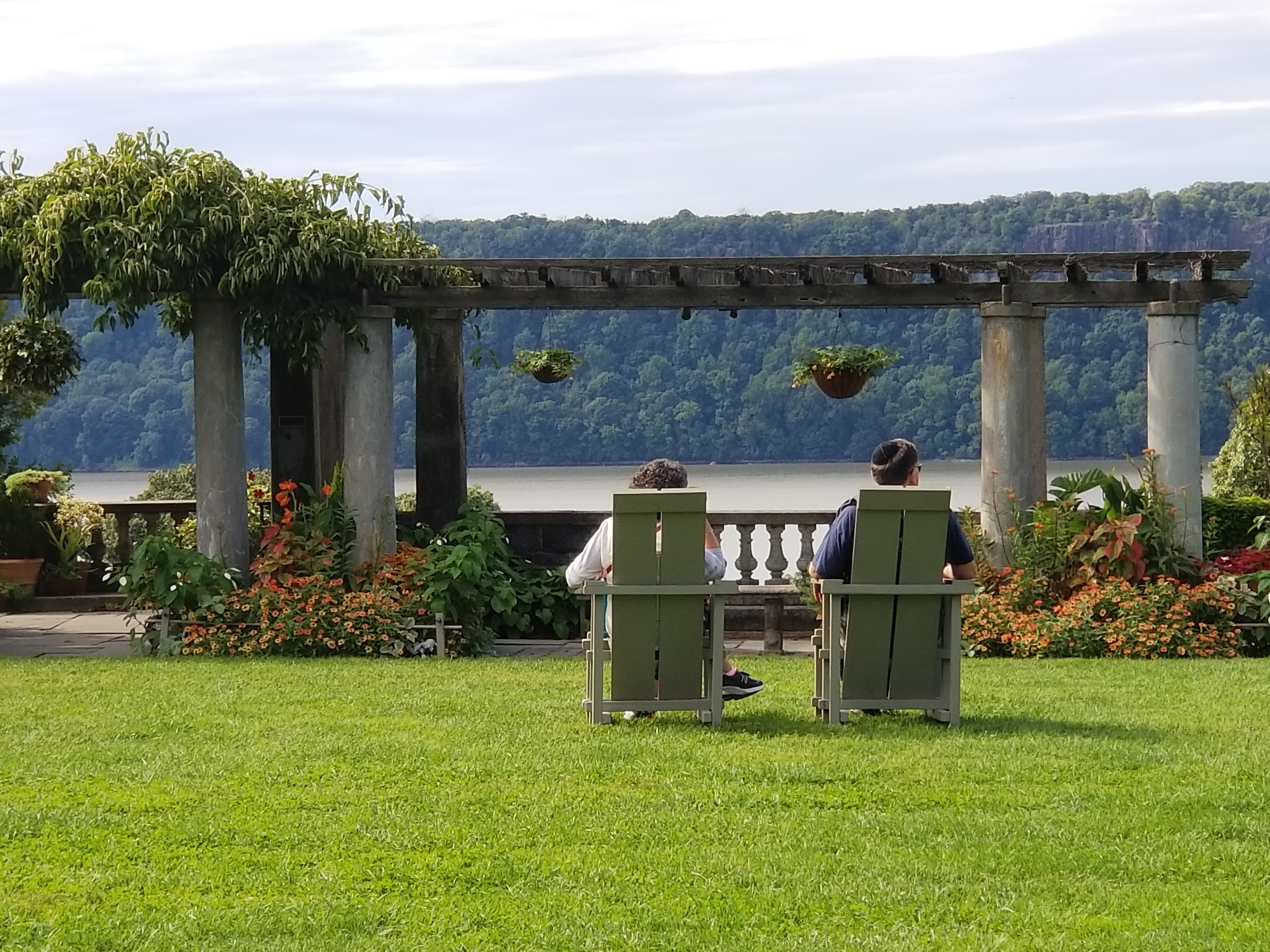
View of Wave Hill's Pergola

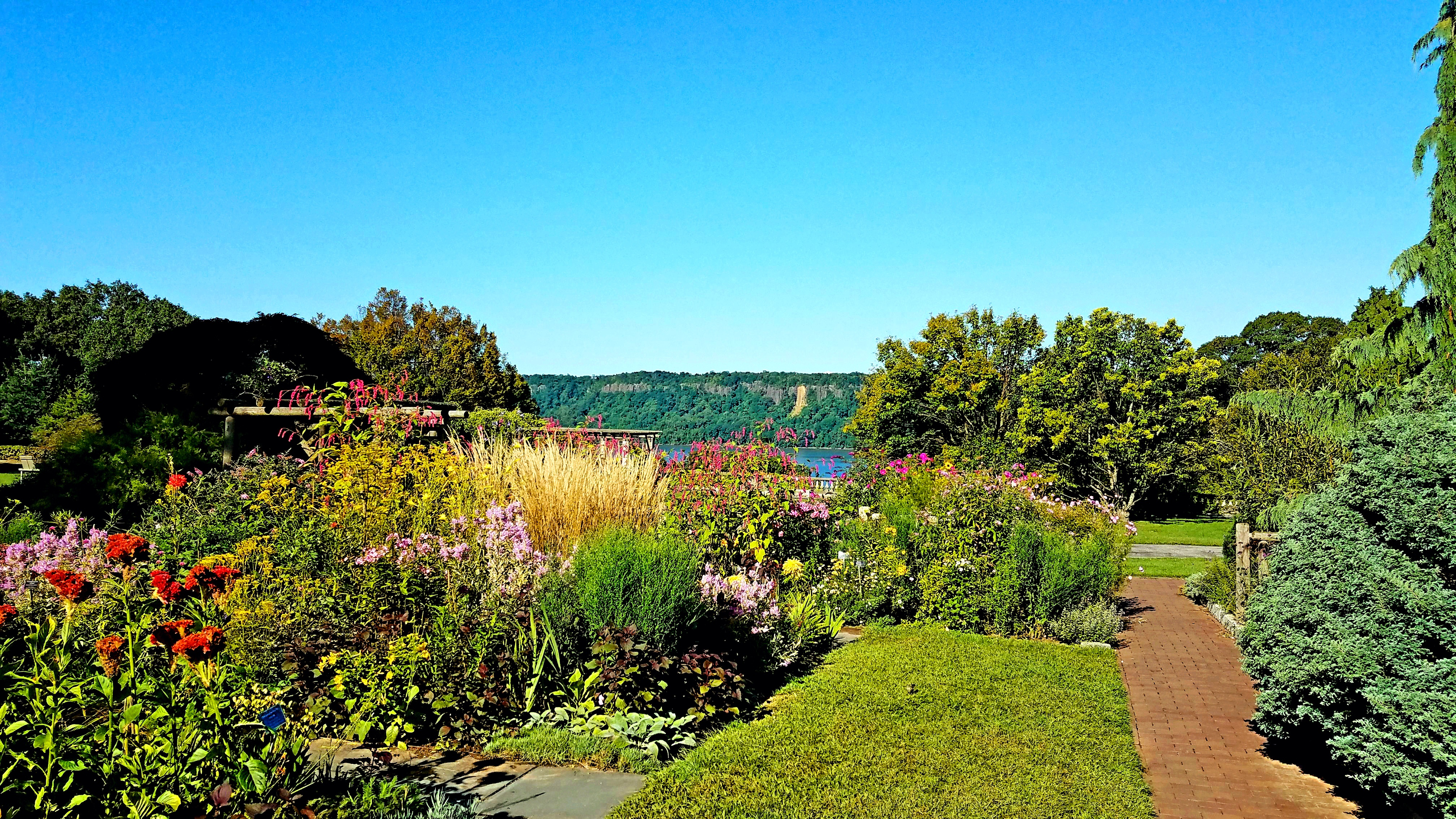
Flower Garden

Wave Hill's formal gardens feature a variety of plants, usually based on type. Garden areas include:

- The T. H. Everett Alpine House, named for Thomas H. Everett, who advocated for the preservation and restoration of Wave Hill as a New York City Landmark
- Herb and Dry Gardens
- Aquatic & Monocot Garden
- Bee hives in the woodland area
- The Herbert & Hyonja Abrons Woodland, 10 acres (40,000 m^{2}) of native second-growth forest, with a woodland path that stretches around the perimeter of the property
- The Marco Polo Stufano Conservatory, named after Wave Hill's founding Director of Horticulture, Marco Polo Stufano, including the Palm House, the Tropical House, and the Cactus and Succulent House
- The perennial Flower Garden
- Pergola and vistas of the Hudson River and the New Jersey Palisades
- Special Collections, including the Shade Border, Elliptical Garden and Conifer Slope
- Wild Garden

Additionally, Wave Hill's gardens is a hotspot for birding in New York City, with 127 species to date — including ruby-throated hummingbirds, great blue herons, and bald eagles.

- The landscape of Wave Hill includes several mature trees that predate the estate's development, including an American elm (Ulmus americana). The elm is among the surviving large specimens of a species once widely planted throughout North America but severely reduced by Dutch elm disease in the 20th century. In 1985 this tree was recognized by the New York City's Parks Department as a Great Tree of New York City.

It also abuts Riverdale Park.

== Programs ==
Wave Hill offers a variety of programming around horticulture, the arts, and education.

Visitors to Wave Hill may visit art exhibitions in Glyndor House, home to Wave Hill’s art galleries, as well as in locations throughout the grounds. Exhibitions typically include artwork inspired by Wave Hill or nature more broadly. Temporary exhibitions are presented throughout the year.

Additionally, Wave Hill’s Winter Workspace program hosts artists at Glyndor House for working sessions of six to eight weeks from January through April. Working artists are able to use the gardens and resources of the site in their work and to share their work in open studios with the public.

== Shop ==
The Shop contains gifts from local artists as well as nature-themed and handmade items. The Shop is located in the Perkins Visitors Center.

== Cafe and Terrace ==
The Cafe is located in the Wave Hill House and offers a variety of hot and cold foods. The Cafe includes indoor eating areas and access to the Kate French Terrace located behind the Wave Hill House.

== Gallery ==
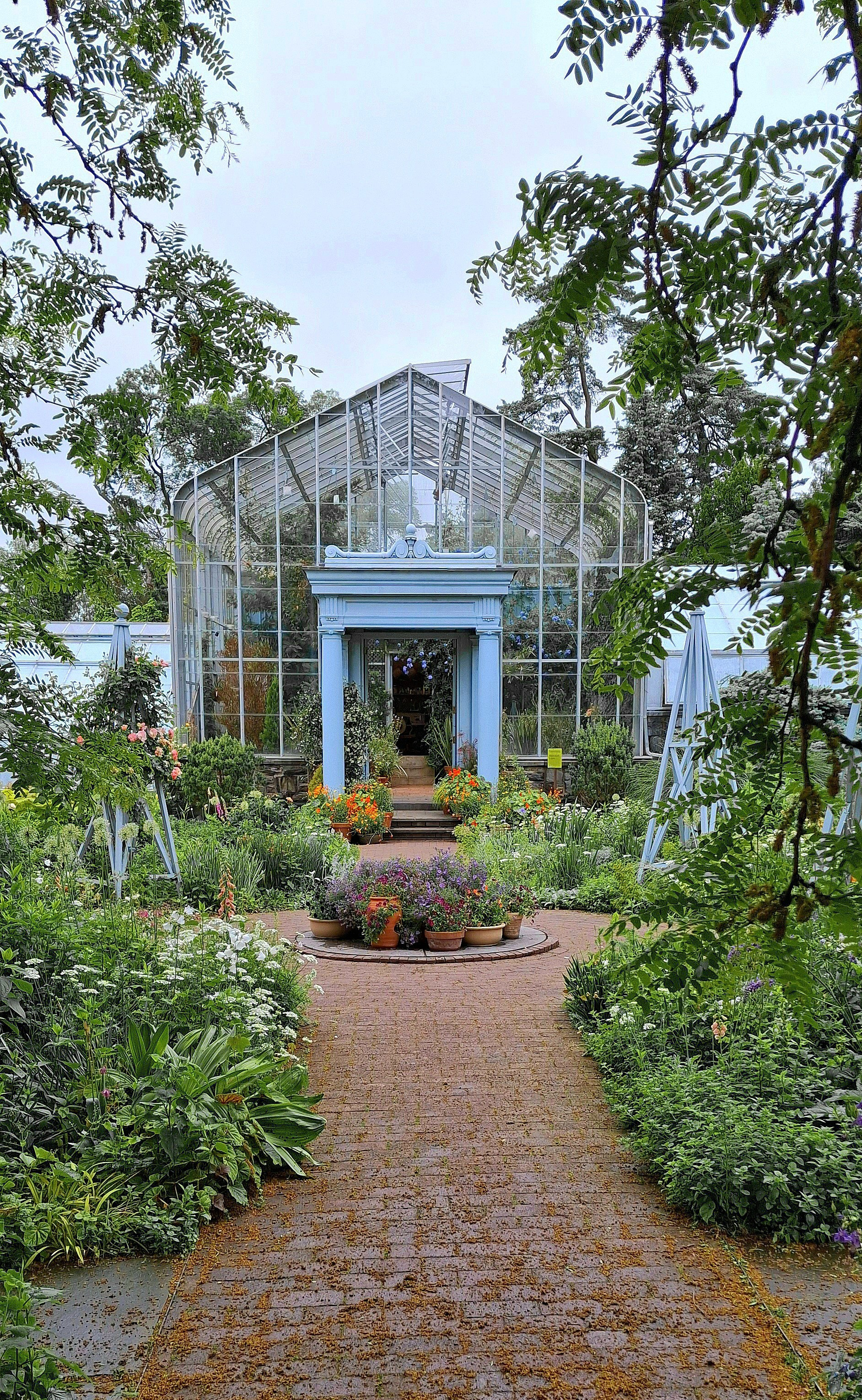
The Marco Polo Stufano Conservatory, with the original portico built in 1906

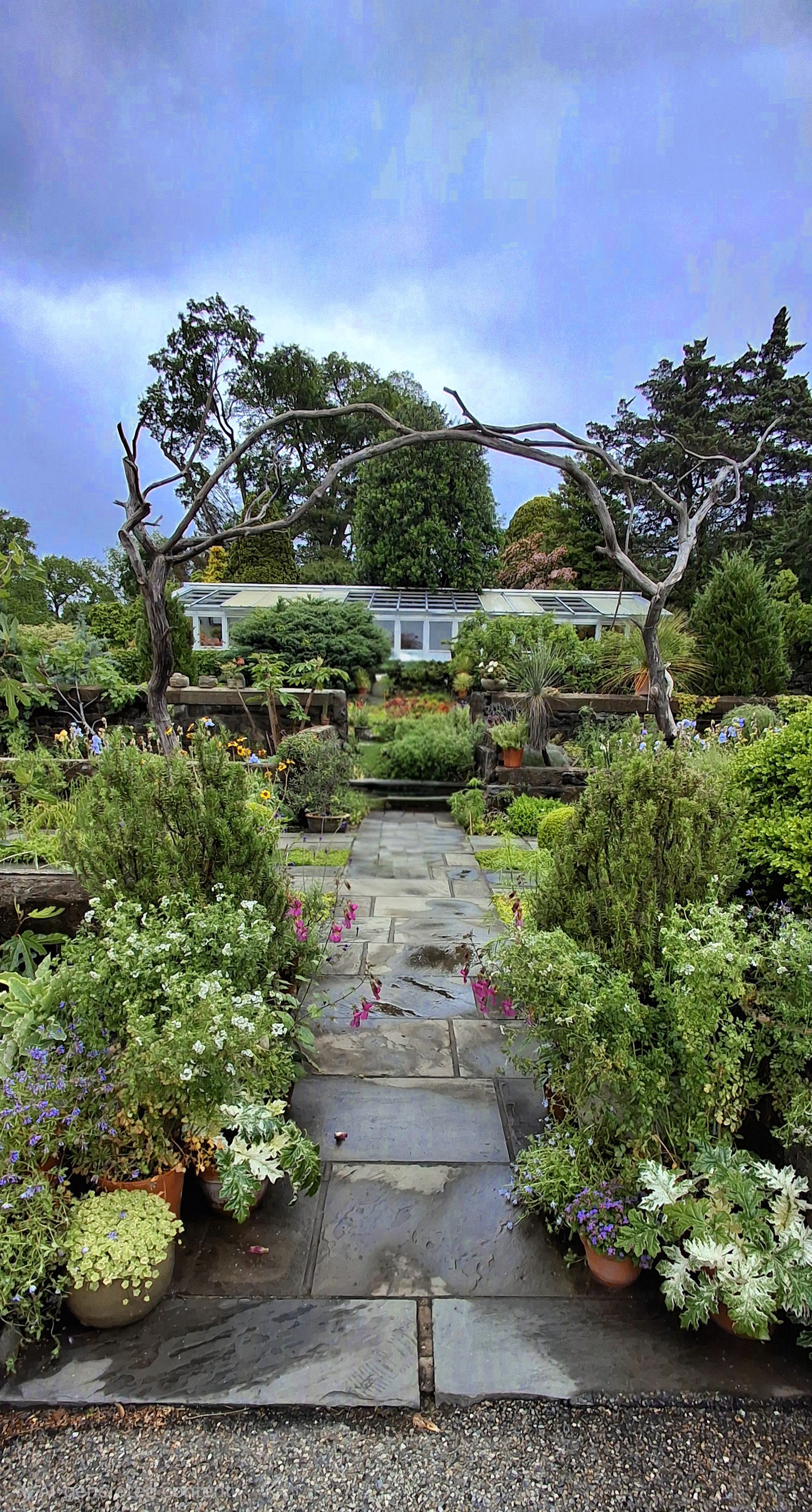
Herb and Dry Gardens

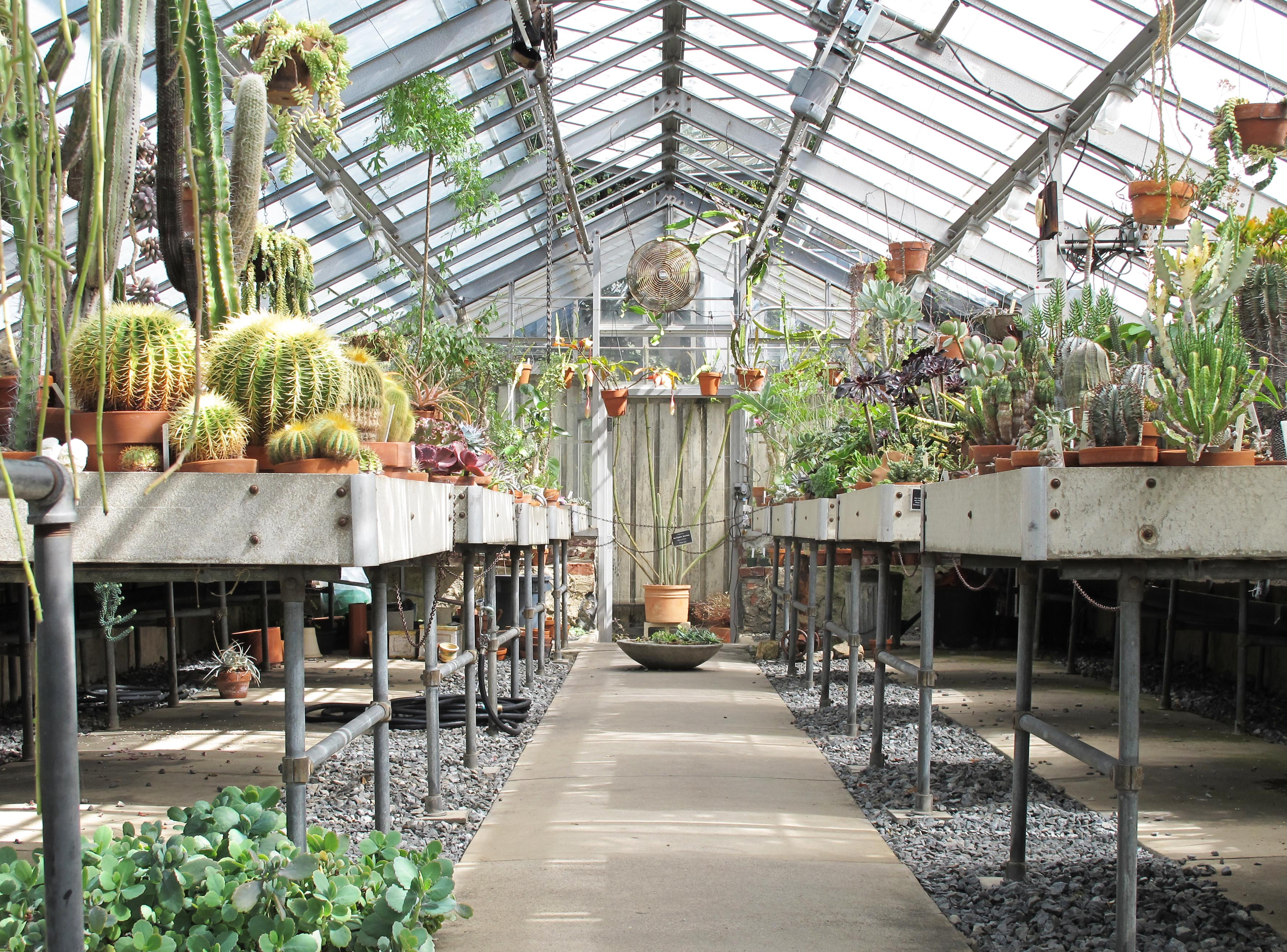
The Cactus and Succulent House collection that includes more than 1,100 contained-grown plants

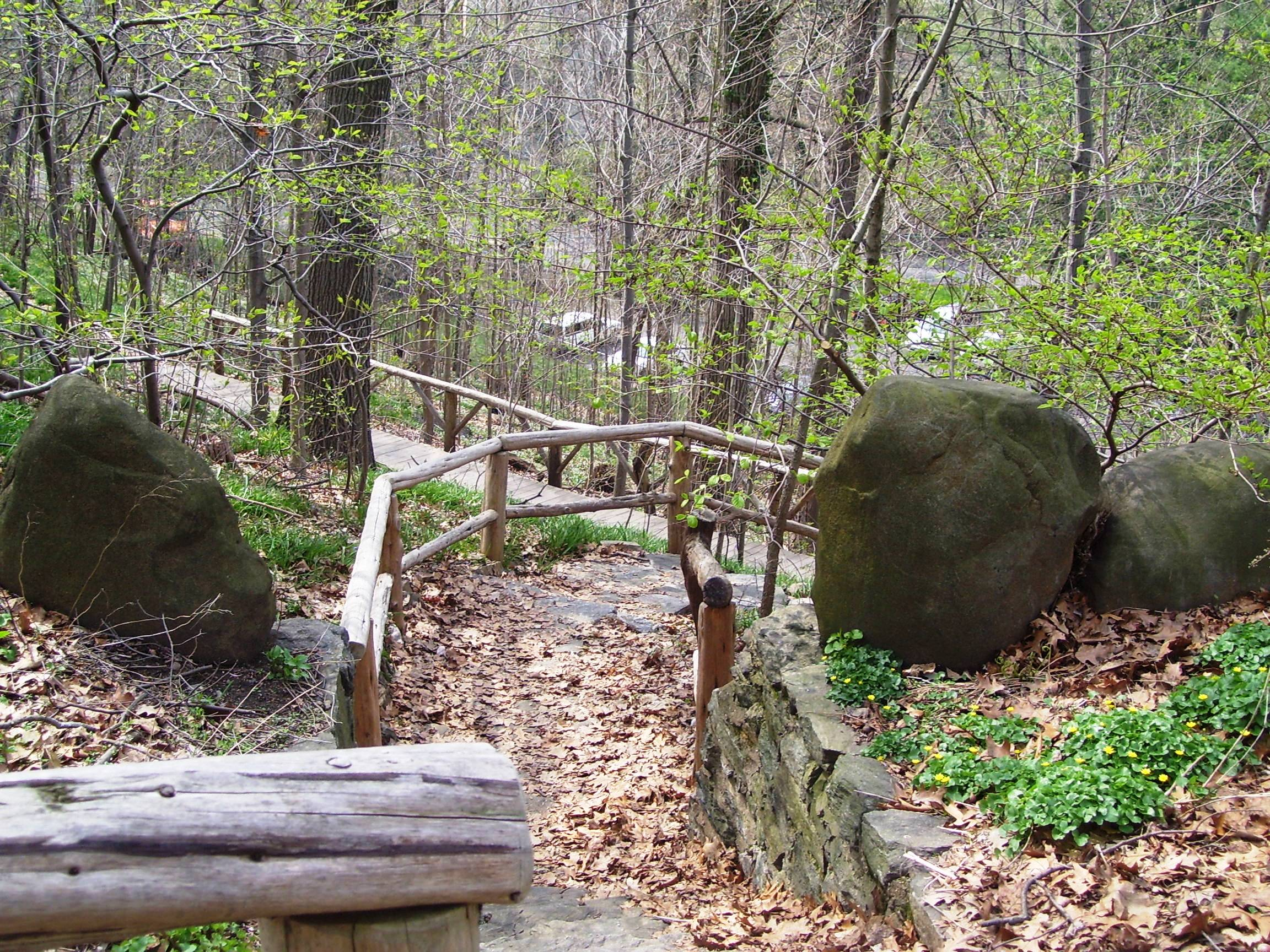
Part of the Abrons Woodland path

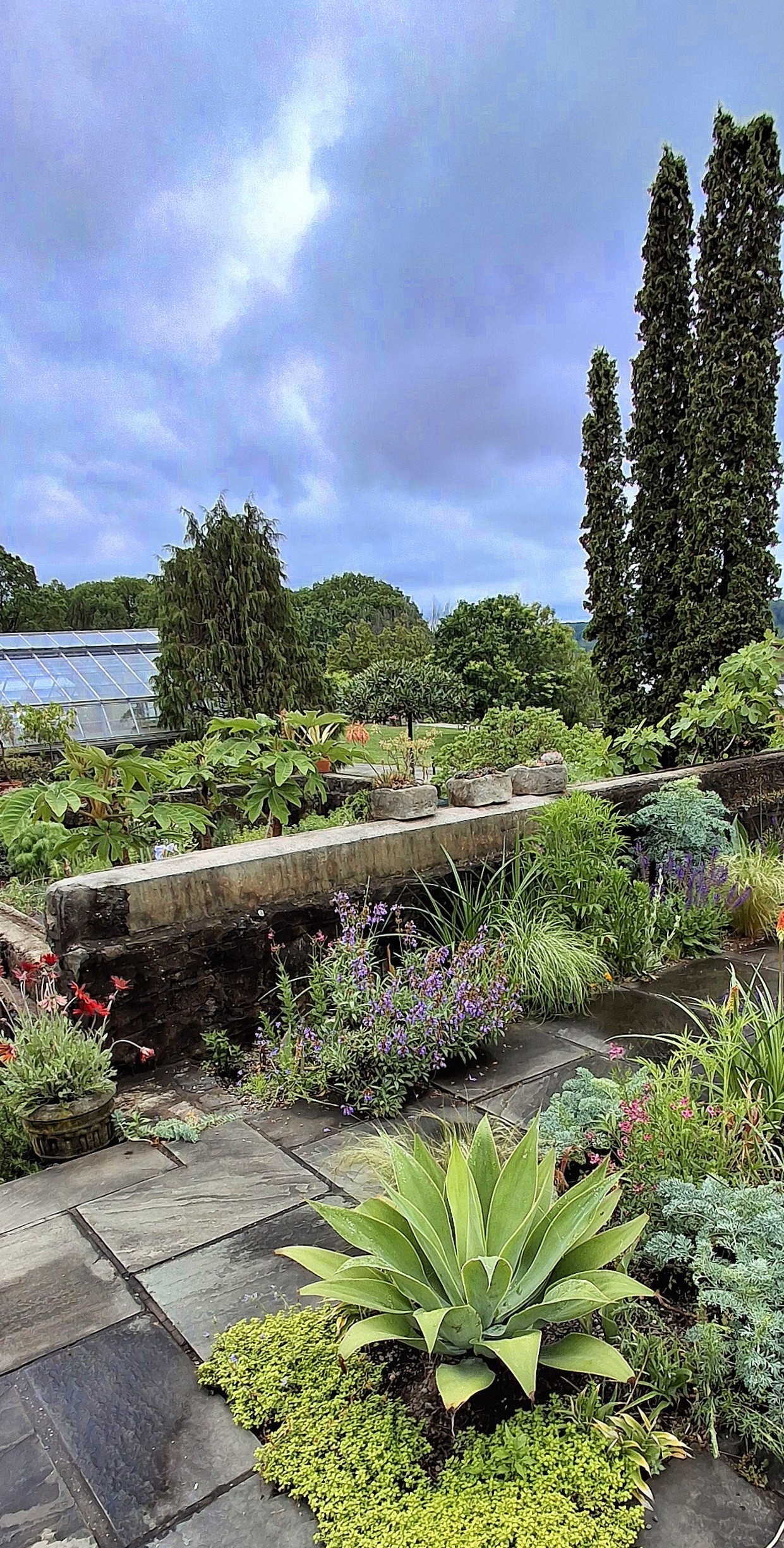
View from the terrace of the Alpine House

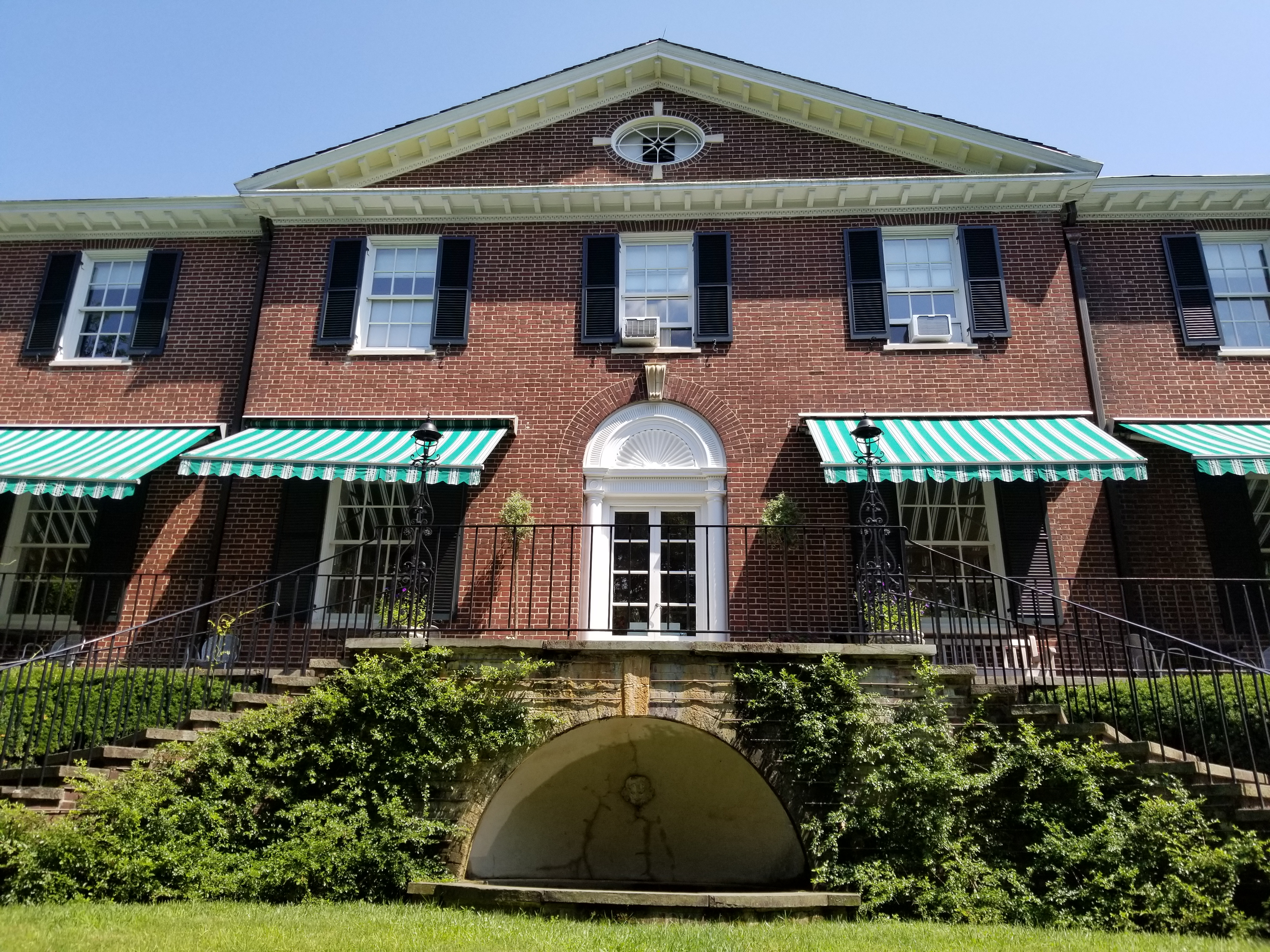
Glyndor House

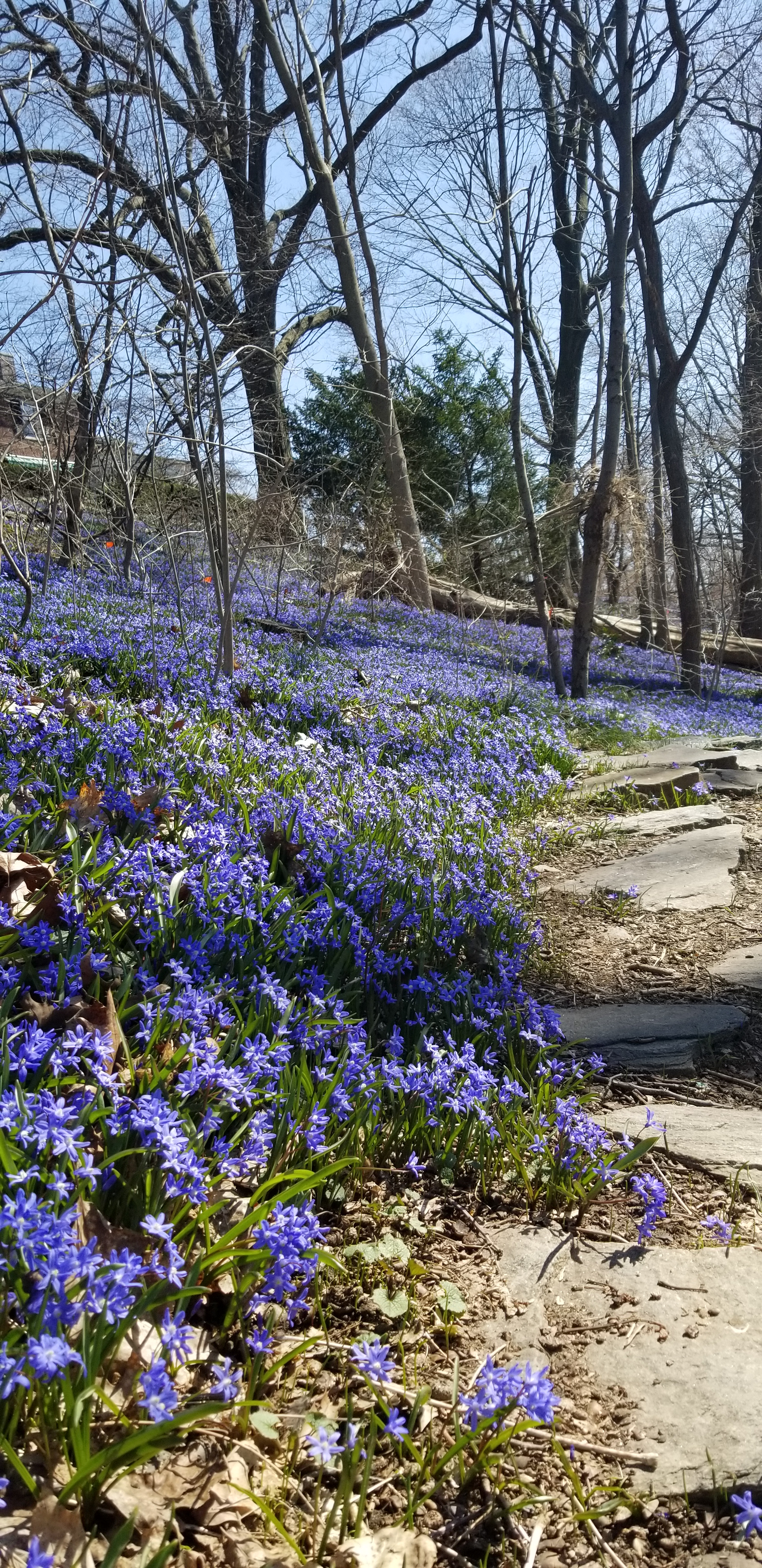
Wave Hill's Woodlands in the spring, with chionodoxa blooming

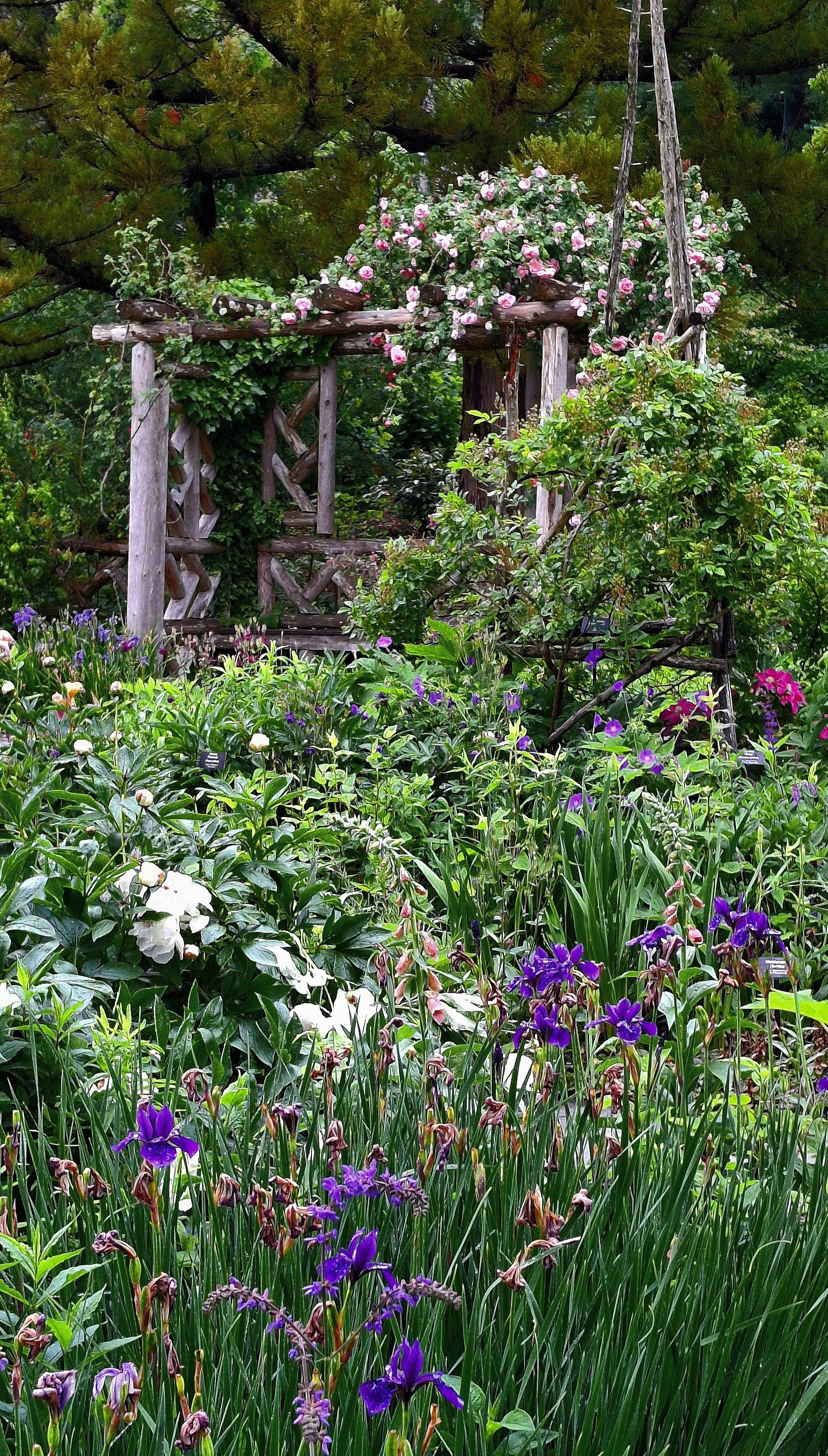
Rose arbor in the Flower Garden

== See also ==
- List of botanical gardens and arboretums in the United States
- List of New York City Designated Landmarks in the Bronx
- National Register of Historic Places listings in the Bronx
