= Dead Creek =

Location
- Country: United States
- State: New York

Physical characteristics
- Mouth: South Branch Grass River
  - location: Cranberry Lake, New York
  - coordinates: 44°15′09″N 74°48′37″W
  - elevation: 1,380 ft (420 m)
- Basin size: 24.4 mi^{2} (63 km^{2})

Dead Creek flows into the South Branch Grass River near Cranberry Lake, New York.
