= Alder Brook =

Location
- Country: United States
- State: New York

Physical characteristics
- Mouth: Middle Branch Grass River
  - location: Degrasse, New York
  - coordinates: 44°23′21″N 75°01′23″W
  - elevation: 900 ft (270 m)
- Basin size: 5.06 mi^{2} (13.1 km^{2})

Alder Brook flows into the Middle Branch Grass River near Degrasse, New York.
