= Clare Town Hall (New York) =

Historic building in New York, United States

- U.S. National Register of Historic Places
- Location within New York Location within the United States
- Location: 3441 CR 27, Clare, New York
- Coordinates: 44°26′6″N 75°3′21″W
- Area: less than one acre
- Built: 1897
- Architect: Bird, John
- Architectural style: Vernacular meeting house
- NRHP reference No.: 04001343
- Added to NRHP: December 06, 2004

Clare Town Hall, also known as Town of Clare Museum, is a historic town hall building located at Clare in St. Lawrence County, New York. It was built in 1897 and is a simple 1-story, three-by-three-bay, clapboard-sided frame building, 30 feet wide and 50 feet, 6 inches long. It was used as the town hall until 1968, when it became the town museum.

It was listed on the National Register of Historic Places in 2004.
