= Moosehead Pond Outlet =

River in New York, United States

Location
- Country: United States
- State: New York

Physical characteristics
- Mouth: South Branch Grass River
  - location: Newbridge, New York
  - coordinates: 44°17′09″N 74°57′51″W
  - elevation: 1,220 ft (370 m)
- Basin size: 7.87 mi^{2} (20.4 km^{2})

Moosehead Pond Outlet flows into the South Branch Grass River near Newbridge, New York.
