= Chase Mills, New York =

- Hamlet
- Location within New York Location within the United States
- Coordinates: 44°50′56″N 75°04′51″W
- Country: United States
- State: New York
- County: St. Lawrence
- Elevation: 269 ft (82 m)
- Time zone: UTC-5 (Eastern (EST))
  - Summer (DST): UTC-4 (EDT)
- ZIP code: 13621
- Area codes: 315 & 680
- GNIS feature ID: 976120

Chase Mills is a hamlet in St. Lawrence County, New York, United States. The community is located along the Grasse River, 6.2 miles (10.0 km) east of Waddington. Chase Mills has a post office with ZIP code 13621, which opened on November 19, 1853.
