= Russell Town Hall =

- U.S. National Register of Historic Places
- Location within New York Location within the United States
- Location: Jct. of Main and Mill Sts., NW corner, Russell, New York, U.S.
- Coordinates: 44°25′46″N 75°9′2″W
- Area: less than one acre
- Built: 1921
- Architect: Williams, Samuel D.P.; Cameron, Wm., et al.
- Architectural style: Classical Revival
- NRHP reference No.: 95001492
- Added to NRHP: January 4, 1996

Russell Town Hall is a historic town hall building located at Russell in St. Lawrence County, New York. It was built in 1921 and is a three-story Classical Revival style structure. The ground story is built of sandstone and upper story is of brick. It was originally constructed with town offices on the lower floor and a two-story theater on the upper floor. The five bay east facade features a three bay portico. The site was donated to the community in about 1917 by Seymour H. Knox I, who was born at Russell in April 1861.

It was listed on the National Register of Historic Places in 1996.
