= Jocks Pond Outlet =

Location
- Country: United States
- State: New York

Physical characteristics
- Mouth: South Branch Grass River
  - location: Shurtleff, New York
  - coordinates: 44°15′04″N 74°42′38″W
  - elevation: 1,505 ft (459 m)
- Basin size: 6.46 mi^{2} (16.7 km^{2})

Jocks Pond Outlet flows into the South Branch Grass River near Shurtleff, New York.
