= Nettle Creek (Grass River tributary) =

Location
- Country: United States
- State: New York

Physical characteristics
- Mouth: Grass River
  - location: Bucks Bridge, New York
  - coordinates: 44°42′06″N 75°09′27″W
  - elevation: 286 ft (87 m)
- Basin size: 16.6 mi^{2} (43 km^{2})

The Nettle Creek flows into the Grass River in Bucks Bridge, New York.
