= Grasse River =

Grass River Grasse River
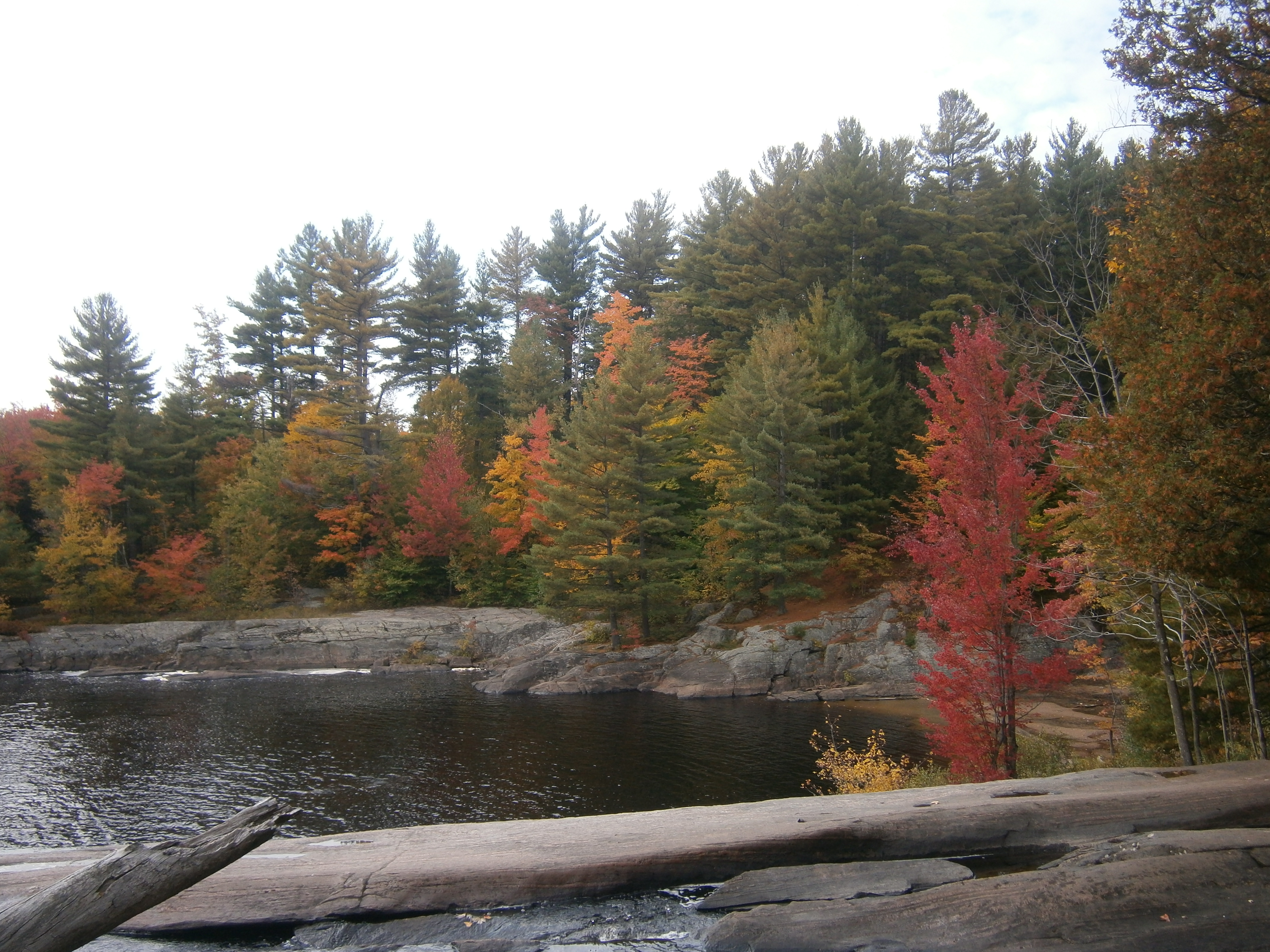

Location
- Country: United States
- State: (New York (state)) New York

Physical characteristics
- Source: Middle Branch Grass River, South Branch Grass River
- Mouth: St. Lawrence River
  - location: Massena, New York
  - coordinates: 44°59′12″N 74°46′14″W
  - elevation: 171 ft (52 m)
- Length: 73 mi (117 km)
- Basin size: 619 mi^{2} (1,600 km^{2})

Basin features
- Tributaries
  - left: Black Brook, Plumb Brook, Gibbons Brook, Harrison Creek, Line Creek, Massena Power Canal
  - right: North Branch Grass River, Pleasant Creek, Edmond Brook, Little River, Nettle Creek, McConnell Creek
- Waterfalls: Lampsons Falls

The Grasse River or Grass River (per 1905 decision of the U.S. Board on Geographic Names) is a 73-mile-long (117 km) river in northern New York, in the United States. The river mainly flows northeast from the foothills of the Adirondack Mountains into the St. Lawrence Valley, making up what is known as the greater St. Lawrence River Drainage Basin along with other tributaries such as the Oswegatchie and Raquette rivers.

The river was named after François Joseph Paul, comte de Grasse, a French admiral and hero of the American Revolutionary War. He defeated British forces in the Battle of the Chesapeake, contributing to their surrender at Yorktown, ending the war.

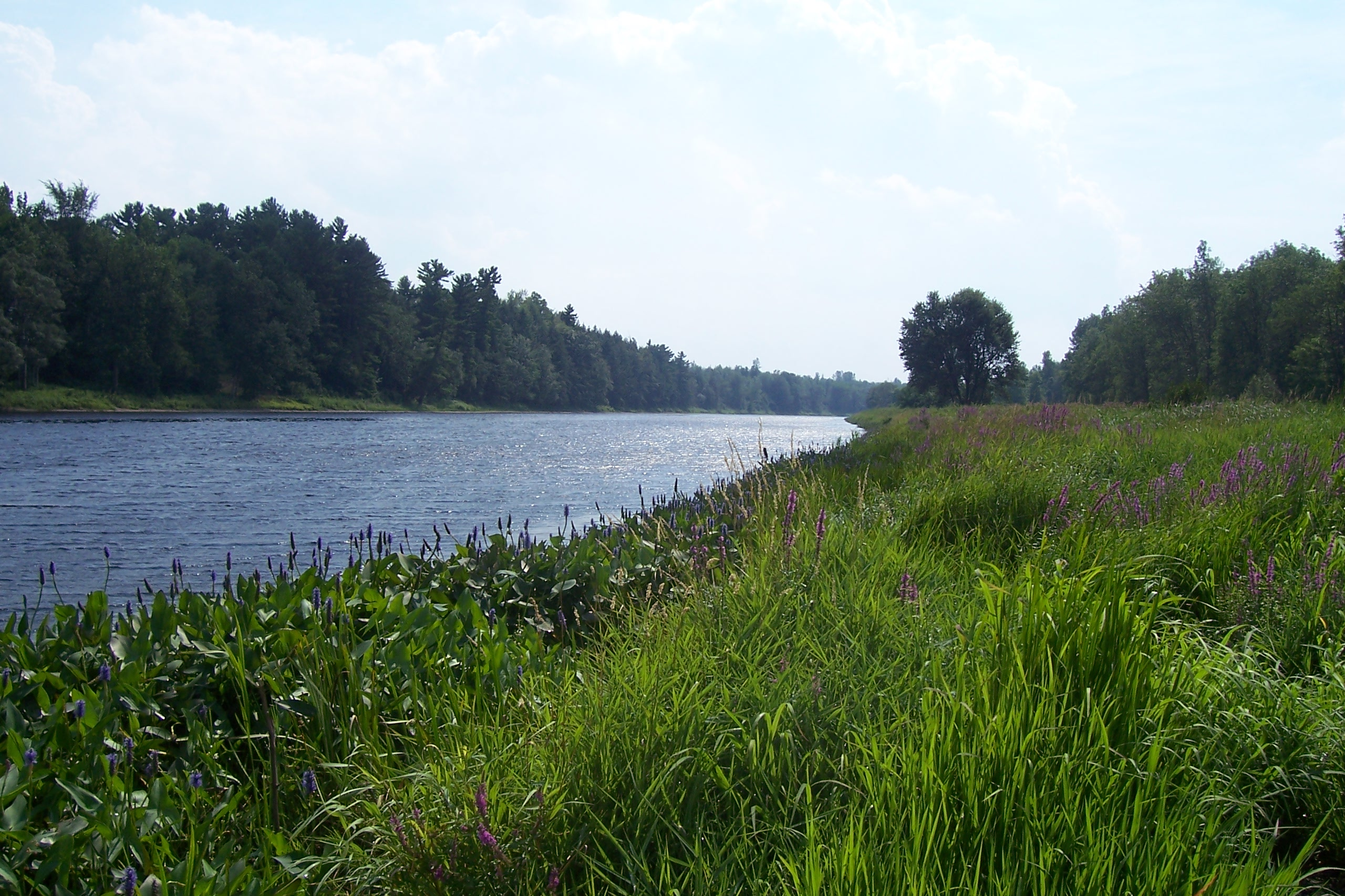
The Grasse River upstream of Massena, @ Hwy 56

The Grasse River in Massena Center

Dredging of the Grasse River

Sinking of the Steamer Sirius on the Grasse River

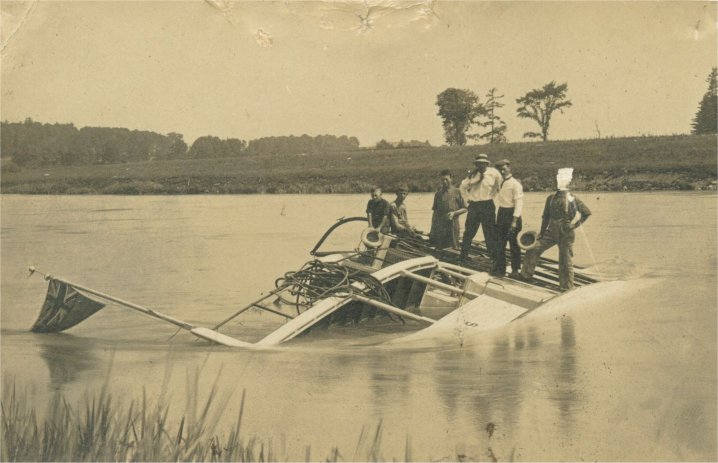
Another of the Steamer Sirius

== The source ==
The river is created by a series of small ponds, lakes and streams located in the northern New York towns of Russell, Clare and Clifton. Two main branches of streams and ponds, known as the Northern Branch and Southern Branch, lay claim as the ultimate source. The southern branch is the dominant flow of the river, feeding off Moosehead Pond and Little Moosehead Pond, and is located near the hamlet of Degrasse. The weaker northern branch is fed from smaller ponds such as Clear Pond, Bullhead Pond and Horseshoe Pond near the hamlet of Russell, and runs through the Grasse River Wild Forest Reserve. The two branches meet in the town of Russell and form the main branch of the river, which slowly grows along its northeasterly track.

This area of New York was first explored in the 1790s as part of the Macomb's Purchase, in which Alexander Macomb, a wealthy Revolutionary-Era American merchant purchased 3.6 million acres (15,000 km²) from New York State at 12 cents an acre. This area was divided into counties and townships which were established between 1800 and 1815. The area thrived on thick pine forests, stone quarries and the mining of various ores. On the St. Lawrence Valley floor, the pine forests were razed and the land used for agriculture, and later for industry.

== Course ==
The Grasse River, along with the other tributaries to the St. Lawrence River, served as a water power source for several mills in the towns and hamlets along its course. Almost none of these mills has survived, but stone foundations, burned out furnaces, and other ancient structures can be located along its banks. Several Old World dams exist along the path of the Grasse River. Its so-called "twin" sister river, the Raquette, contains a series of old and new age hydropower dams.

The Grasse River makes its way through many small hamlets and two major towns, Massena and Canton. From the town of Russell where its two source branches meet, the river makes its way into the village of Canton flowing mostly north away from the Adirondack foothills. It flows past the hamlets of Morley and Bucks Bridge into the town of Madrid.

The first of two major dams was built several yards west of New York State Route 345 in Madrid hamlet. Just south of the dam is the Madrid Municipal Park, which hosts several large events during the summer season. The Madrid Country Club is located upriver from the park on the northern bank. From this point, the river flows northwards to the hamlet of Chase Mills near Coles Creek State Park on the St. Lawrence River.

From Chase Mills, the river begins its northeasterly path into the town of Louisville passing through a series of small rapids or waterfalls, depending on the amount of water flowing. The river then flows into the township and village of Massena, passing by the Massena Rod & Gun Club on the northern bank, in the town of Louisville.

The Grasse River defines the northern edge of Massena's downtown district. At the southern end of the village, the Raquette River was the location of the Massena Health Spa and Health Spring. Located several yards east of the downtown bridge on the Grasse River is the second remaining major dam of the river, known as the Downtown Dam or "weir", standing only 3–4 feet (1 m) tall. In the late 1990s, the midsection of the weir was breached and now lies several yards away from the dam.

The river continues to cut through the village of Massena to the eastern borders, where the old Massena Power Canal connects with the river. This canal was constructed by the Pittsburgh Reduction Company (now Alcoa) in the 1900s. The canal connects the Grasse River with the St. Lawrence River and was used to supply a hydropower dam. The dam was one of the first ten hydro-dams built in the United States, operating until 1956 when the St. Lawrence River was flooded for the St. Lawrence Seaway Project. The St. Lawrence River end of the canal is blocked off by a massive wall, known as the Massena Intake (the village water supply is also drawn in through this wall). On the Grasse River end, the cement and brick structure of the old powerhouse remains, without any equipment inside the original buildings.

The river from the old powerhouse onwards is calm and level to its mouth in the St. Lawrence River. This section of the river is the only section that can be traversed by motor or power boats, but activity is light as Lake St. Lawrence is the draw for boating in the area (which is behind a pair of shipping locks and two dams if one were trying to travel from the Grasse to the lake). This was only possible during the construction of the old powerhouse, as the river was dredged to 15 feet (4.6 m) along its course to the St. Lawrence. At the mouth of the Grasse River is Snell Lock, part of the St. Lawrence Seaway Shipping System. Several hundred yards upriver from the mouth of the Grasse is a docking area which contains a large floating crane with replacement doors for the locks, and the tugboat Robinson Bay, which is used for icebreaking in the spring.

== Pollution and environmental degradation ==
High levels of PCB contaminate the last several miles of the Grasse, the most significant being located near the old powerhouse and at a drainage outlet on the river for the Alcoa plant located north. Alcoa has spent years cleaning this section of the river. In an early attempt at cleanup, the company "capped" the river bottom so that the chemicals could not be released. This plan failed due to the weir break in the village of Massena and resulting ice flows. Before its breach, this weir had kept ice upriver longer, allowing it to melt. Since it was breached, larger pieces of ice now flow down this section of the river and have breached the river bottom cap. It has also caused major erosion of the shoreline along this section of the river, due to the ice gouging it out during the spring ice flows.

=== Cleanup efforts ===
In 2005, a company was hired by ALCOA to remove the chemicals from the riverbed near what is known as "Outfall One", one of the factory's water drainages just downriver from the powerhouse. The river bottom was removed and piped into machines where it was cleaned and deposited in a private landfill on ALCOA's property. ALCOA is also working on plans to prevent large chunks of ice from moving down this section of river. Early plans called for large cement barriers to be built in the town of Louisville, but those plans have met some opposition from local residents. Other ideas have included repairing and/or rebuilding the downtown weir in Massena, but many problems have cropped up. The weir is privately owned (by a deed that gives ownership over that section of river down to the bedrock). The most recent idea, proposed by the Massena Electric Company, calls for a small one-turbine hydroelectric dam to be constructed about a half-mile downriver from the old weir.

== See also ==
- List of New York rivers
