= Line Creek (South Dakota) =

Stream in South Dakota, U.S.

Coordinates: 45°17′07″N 101°56′44″W

Line Creek is a stream in the U.S. state of South Dakota.

Line Creek received its name from the fact it flows near the border (line) of the Cheyenne River Indian Reservation.

== See also ==
- List of rivers of South Dakota
