= Allen Pond Outlet =

Location
- Country: United States
- State: New York

Physical characteristics
- Mouth: South Branch Grass River
  - location: Clarksboro, New York
  - coordinates: 44°19′37″N 75°00′37″W
  - elevation: 1,024 ft (312 m)
- Basin size: 6.14 mi^{2} (15.9 km^{2})

Allen Pond Outlet flows into the South Branch Grass River near Clarksboro, New York.
