= Line Creek (Flint River tributary) =

Stream in Georgia, U.S.

Coordinates: 33°11′00″N 84°29′50″W

Line Creek is a stream in Coweta, Fayette, Fulton, Meriwether, Spalding and Troup counties in the U.S. state of Georgia. It is a tributary to the Flint River.

Line Creek was so named for the fact the Coweta-Fayette county line is formed by its course.
