= Black oak =

Black oak is a common name for several species of tree. These include:

- Quercus kelloggii, the California black oak, from the western United States
- Quercus velutina, the eastern black oak, from the eastern United States and Canada
- Casuarina pauper, an Australian tree species
- Trigonobalanus excelsa, the Colombian black oak, an oak relative from Colombia
