= Line Creek (Grass River tributary) =

Location
- Country: United States
- State: New York

Physical characteristics
- Mouth: Grass River
  - location: Buck Bridge, New York
  - coordinates: 44°42′55″N 75°09′09″W
  - elevation: 280 ft (85 m)
- Basin size: 17.8 mi^{2} (46 km^{2})

Line Creek flows into the Grass River in Buck Bridge, New York.
