= Russell, New York =

- Town
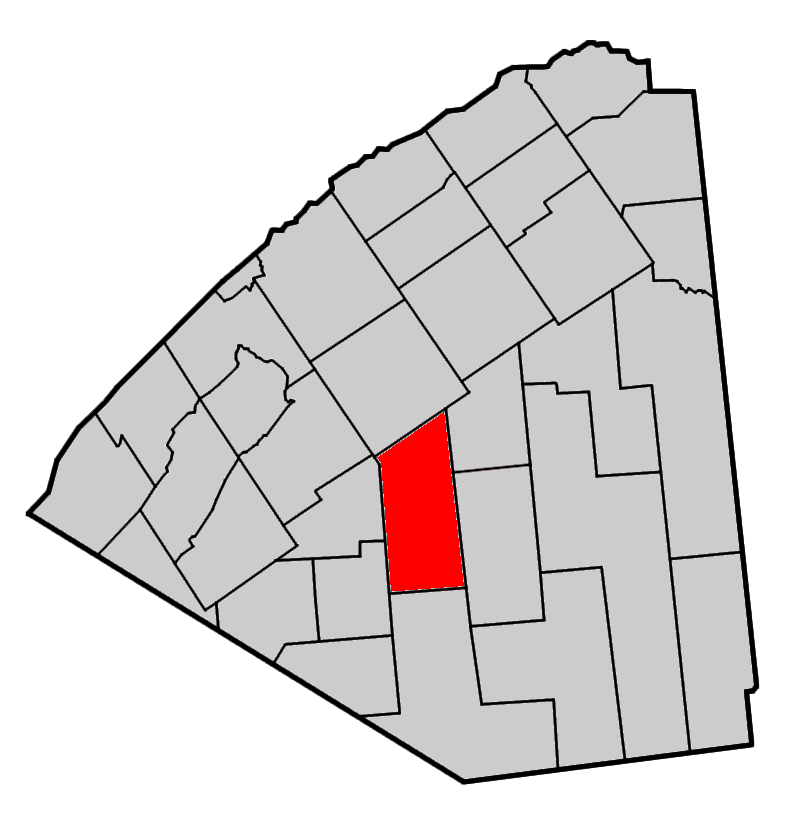
- Map highlighting Russell's location within St. Lawrence County.

- Location within the state of New York
- Coordinates: 44°24′11″N 75°8′28″W
- Country: United States
- State: New York
- County: St. Lawrence

Area
  - Total: 97.29 sq mi (251.99 km^{2})
  - Land: 96.49 sq mi (249.92 km^{2})
  - Water: 0.80 sq mi (2.07 km^{2})
- Elevation: 823 ft (251 m)

Population (2020)
  - Total: 1,872
  - Density: 18.7/sq mi (7.22/km^{2})
- Time zone: UTC-5 (Eastern (EST))
  - Summer (DST): UTC-4 (EDT)
- FIPS code: 36-64221
- GNIS feature ID: 0979442

Russell is a town in St. Lawrence County, New York, United States. The population was 1,856 at the 2010 census. The town is named after Russell Attwater, the pioneer land owner.

The Town of Russell is centrally located in the county and is south of Canton.

== History ==
The town land was purchased by Russell Atwater in 1798. The town was first settled in 1805.

Russell Attwater was elected the first town supervisor, when the town was formed in 1807 from Hopkinton from previously named townships: Dewitt, Ballybean and Sarahsburg. In 1813 and 1816, part of Russell was removed to form the Town of Fowler. More of Russell was taken to form, in whole or part, the Towns of Rossie (1813), Pierrepont (1818), and Fine (1849).

During the War of 1812, an arsenal was located in the town near Russell village. Sold in 1865, it served as a school for many years. The Arsenal was destroyed by fire in 1945.

The Russell Town Hall was listed on the National Register of Historic Places in 1996.

== Notable people ==
- Buffalo, New York businessman Seymour H. Knox I was born in Russell.
- Wisconsin State Assembly member Seymour M. Knox was born in Russell.

== Geography ==
According to the United States Census Bureau, the town has a total area of 97.3 square miles (252 km^{2}), of which 96.8 square miles (251 km^{2}) is land and 0.5 square miles (1.3 km^{2}) (0.54%) is water.

The Grasse River flows northward through the town.

== Demographics ==
Historical population
Census	Pop.	Note	%±
1820	486		—
1830	659		35.6%
1840	1,373		108.3%
1850	1,808		31.7%
1860	2,380		31.6%
1870	2,688		12.9%
1880	2,403		−10.6%
1890	2,132		−11.3%
1900	2,067		−3.0%
1910	1,842		−10.9%
1920	1,757		−4.6%
1930	1,585		−9.8%
1940	1,529		−3.5%
1950	1,472		−3.7%
1960	1,588		7.9%
1970	1,586		−0.1%
1980	1,638		3.3%
1990	1,716		4.8%
2000	1,801		5.0%
2010	1,856		3.1%
2020	1,872		0.9%
U.S. Decennial Census

As of the census of 2000, there were 1,801 people, 650 households, and 482 families residing in the town. The population density was 18.6 inhabitants per square mile (7.2/km^{2}). There were 854 housing units at an average density of 8.8 per square mile (3.4/km^{2}). The racial makeup of the town was 99.00% White, 0.17% African American, 0.22% Native American, 0.22% Asian, 0.06% from other races, and 0.33% from two or more races. Hispanic or Latino of any race were 0.11% of the population.

There were 650 households, out of which 39.8% had children under the age of 18 living with them, 59.2% were married couples living together, 8.9% had a female householder with no husband present, and 25.8% were non-families. 19.4% of all households were made up of individuals, and 8.3% had someone living alone who was 65 years of age or older. The average household size was 2.77 and the average family size was 3.14.

In the town, the population was spread out, with 29.4% under the age of 18, 7.5% from 18 to 24, 30.0% from 25 to 44, 23.2% from 45 to 64, and 9.9% who were 65 years of age or older. The median age was 35 years. For every 100 females, there were 99.4 males. For every 100 females age 18 and over, there were 99.1 males.

The median income for a household in the town was $31,080, and the median income for a family was $36,118. Males had a median income of $31,927 versus $22,895 for females. The per capita income for the town was $13,530. About 15.7% of families and 19.2% of the population were below the poverty line, including 27.1% of those under age 18 and 8.4% of those age 65 or over.

== Communities and locations in Russell ==
- Boyd Pond – A small lake east of Coopers Corners.
- Clarks Corners – A location east of Russell village on County Road 24.
- Coopers Corners – A location in the eastern part of the town, northeast of South Russell.
- Danes Corners – A location north of Russell village.
- Degrasse – A hamlet in the southeastern part of the town on County Road 17.
- Derbys Corners – A hamlet south of Russell village on County Road 24.
- Devils Elbow – A location on the Grasse River, northwest of Russell village.
- Endersbees Corners – A location in the northeastern part of the town at the junction of Count Roads 25 and 27.
- Fairbanks Corners – A location near the western town line on County Road 21.
- Fordhams Corners – A location east of Stalbird.
- North Russell – A hamlet in the northeastern part of the town on County Road 25.
- Owens Corners – A location east of Clarks Corners on County Road 24 at County Road 25.
- Palmerville – A hamlet southeast of Russell village and near the Grasse River.
- Putnams Corners – A location north of Russell village.
- Reynolds Corners – A location in the eastern part of the town near Coopers Corners.
- Russell – The hamlet of Russell is located by the Grasse River on County Road 17.
- Scotts Corners – A location north of Russell village.
- South Russell – A location in the center of the town on County Road 17.
- Stalbird – A hamlet near the western town line, southwest of Russell village.
- Van House Corners – A location in the eastern part of the town.
- Whippoorwill Corners – A location south of Russell village on County Road 24.
