= Clare, New York =

- Town
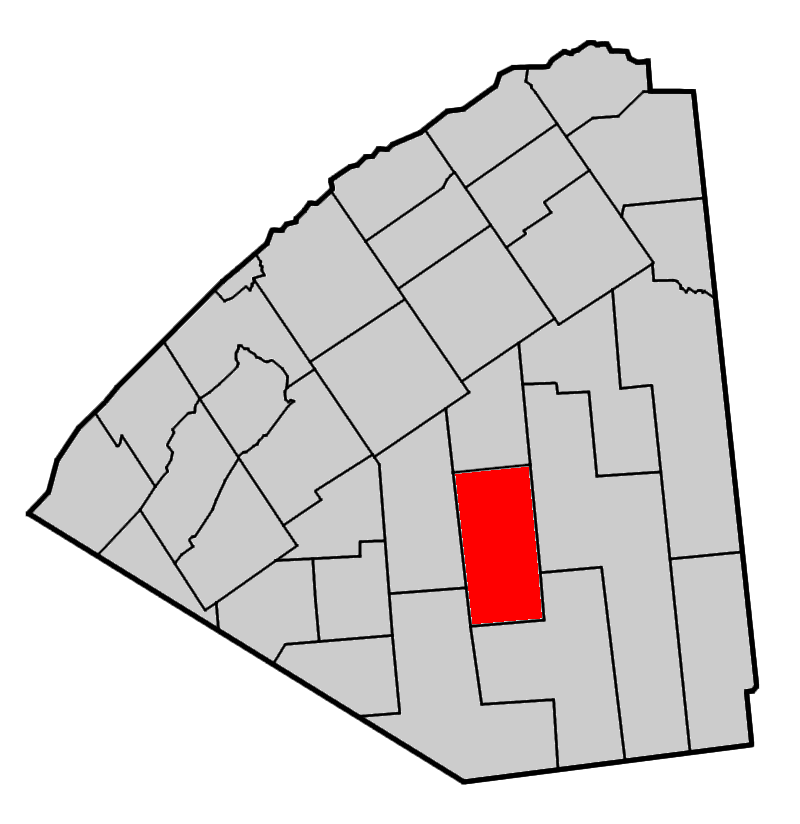
- Map highlighting Clare's location within St. Lawrence County.

- Location within the state of New York
- Coordinates: 44°22′55″N 74°59′31″W
- Country: United States
- State: New York
- County: St. Lawrence

Area
  - Total: 97.26 sq mi (251.89 km^{2})
  - Land: 96.49 sq mi (249.92 km^{2})
  - Water: 0.76 sq mi (1.97 km^{2})
- Elevation: 1,150 ft (350 m)

Population (2010)
  - Total: 105
  - Estimate (2016): 105
  - Density: 1.1/sq mi (0.42/km^{2})
- Time zone: UTC-5 (Eastern (EST))
  - Summer (DST): UTC-4 (EDT)
- FIPS code: 36-15792
- GNIS feature ID: 0978828

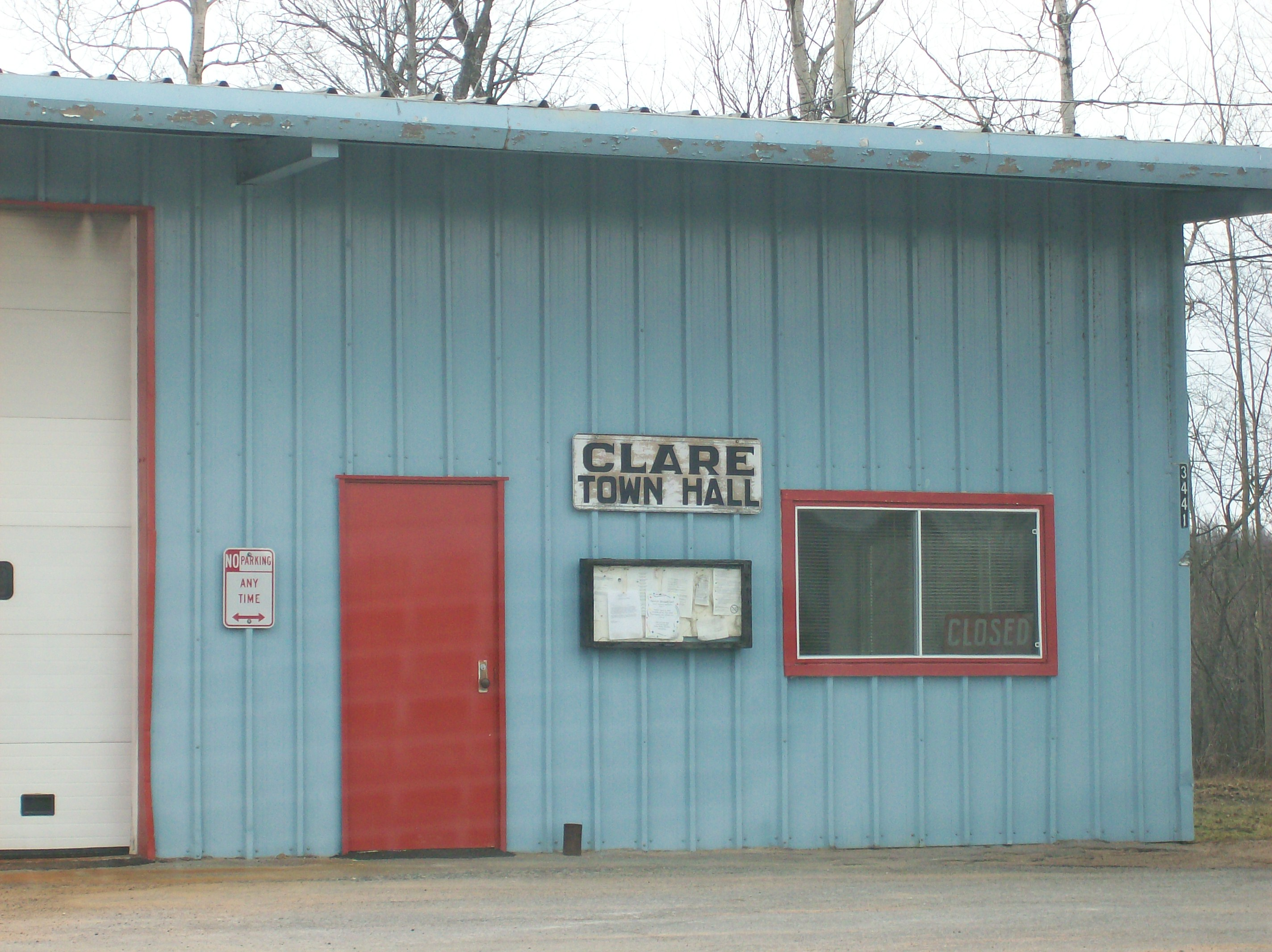
Clare Town Hall

Clare is a town in St. Lawrence County, New York, United States. The population was 105 at the 2010 census.

The Town of Clare is in the south-central part of the county and is south of the Village of Canton, the county seat.

== History ==
The town of Clare, formed in 1880 from part of the town of Pierrepont, was the last town formed in the county. Madam De Stael, a French author, at one time invested in the town lands, on the advice of her friend Gouverneur Morris, while it was still part of Pierrepont.

A history in 1894 indicated that almost no business existed in the town, and there were no organized churches.

The Clare Town Hall was listed on the National Register of Historic Places in 2004.

== Geography ==
According to the United States Census Bureau, the town has a total area of 97.3 square miles (252 km^{2}), of which 96.6 square miles (250 km^{2}) is land and 0.6 square miles (1.6 km^{2}) (0.67%) is water.

The town is in the Adirondack Park, and two branches of the Grasse River flow through it.

== Demographics ==
Historical population
Census	Pop.	Note	%±
1890	281		—
1900	330		17.4%
1910	420		27.3%
1920	152		−63.8%
1930	227		49.3%
1940	139		−38.8%
1950	107		−23.0%
1960	87		−18.7%
1970	97		11.5%
1980	121		24.7%
1990	78		−35.5%
2000	112		43.6%
2010	105		−6.2%
2016 (est.)	105		0.0%
U.S. Decennial Census

As of the census of 2000, there were 112 people, 46 households, and 32 families residing in the town. The population density was 1.2 people per square mile (0.46 people/km^{2}). There were 106 housing units at an average density of 1.1 units per square mile (0.42 units/km^{2}). The racial makeup of the town was 95.54% white, 1.79% Native American, 0.89% from other races, and 1.79% from two or more races. Hispanic or Latino of any race were 0.89% of the population.

There were 46 households, out of which 28.3% had children under the age of 18 living with them, 65.2% were married couples] living together, 4.3% had a female householder with no husband present, and 28.3% were non-families. 26.1% of all households were made up of individuals, and 8.7% had someone living alone who was 65 years of age or older. The average household size was 2.43 and the average family size was 2.91.

In the town, the population was spread out, with 24.1% under the age of 18, 6.3% from 18 to 24, 28.6% from 25 to 44, 27.7% from 45 to 64, and 13.4% who were 65 years of age or older. The median age was 43 years. For every 100 female residents, there were 111.3 male residents. For every 100 female residents age 18 and over, there were 107.3 male residents.

The median income for a household in the town was $26,667, and the median income for a family was $36,250. Male residents had a median income of $25,625 versus $50,833 for female residents. The per capita income for the town was $14,453. There were 6.7% of families and 12.8% of the population living below the poverty line, including 6.5% of under eighteens and none of those over 64.

== Communities and locations in Clare ==
- Brouses Corners – a location north of Clare village on County Road 27 (Clare Road).
- Canton Farm – A location in the eastern part of Clare by the Grass River.
- Clare – The hamlet of Clare is in the northwestern part of the town on County Road 27.
- Clarksboro – A location south of Clare village in the eastern part of Clare.
- Moores landing strip (1E8) – A small grass runway airport south of Clare village.
- Newbridge – A hamlet in the southwestern part of the town.
- Lampson Falls – A collection of waterfalls down a trail off of CR 27.
