= John A. Tibbits =

American publisher and politician (1844–1893)

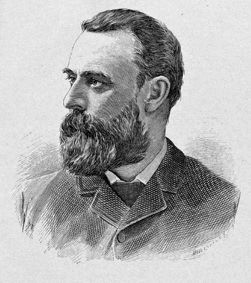

Speaker of the Connecticut House of Representatives
- In office 1886–1886
- Preceded by: William Edgar Simonds
- Succeeded by: Heusted W. R. Hoyt

Member of the Connecticut House of Representatives from New London
- In office 1872–1872
- In office 1885–1886 (Note: Members of the Connecticut House of Representatives served one-year terms until the constitution was amended in 1884.)

Personal details
- Born: February 19, 1844 New London, Connecticut, US
- Died: July 22, 1893 (aged 49) New London, Connecticut, US
- Party: Republican
- Spouse: Lydia Dennis
- Children: 1
- Profession: Publisher, politician

Military service
- Allegiance: United States
- Branch/service: United States Army
- Years of service: 1862–1865
- Rank: Major
- Unit: 14th Connecticut Infantry Regiment
- Battles/wars: American Civil War; Battle of Antietam; Battle of Chancellorsville; Battle of Gettysburg

John Arnold Tibbits (Note: His last name is occasionally spelled Tibbitts or Tibbets.) (February 19, 1844 – July 22, 1893) was an American newspaper publisher and politician from Connecticut. Born in New London, Tibbits attended Bartlett High School and Williston Seminary. While he studied at Williams College for a brief period, he never graduated, instead deciding to study law in New London. When the American Civil War broke out, Tibbits enlisted in the Union Army and became a major. After the war, he established the newspaper The Day, among others that have since ceased publishing. Additionally, as a Republican, he represented New London in the Connecticut House of Representatives, including as Speaker in 1886, and was involved in Republican party politics.

== Early life and military service ==
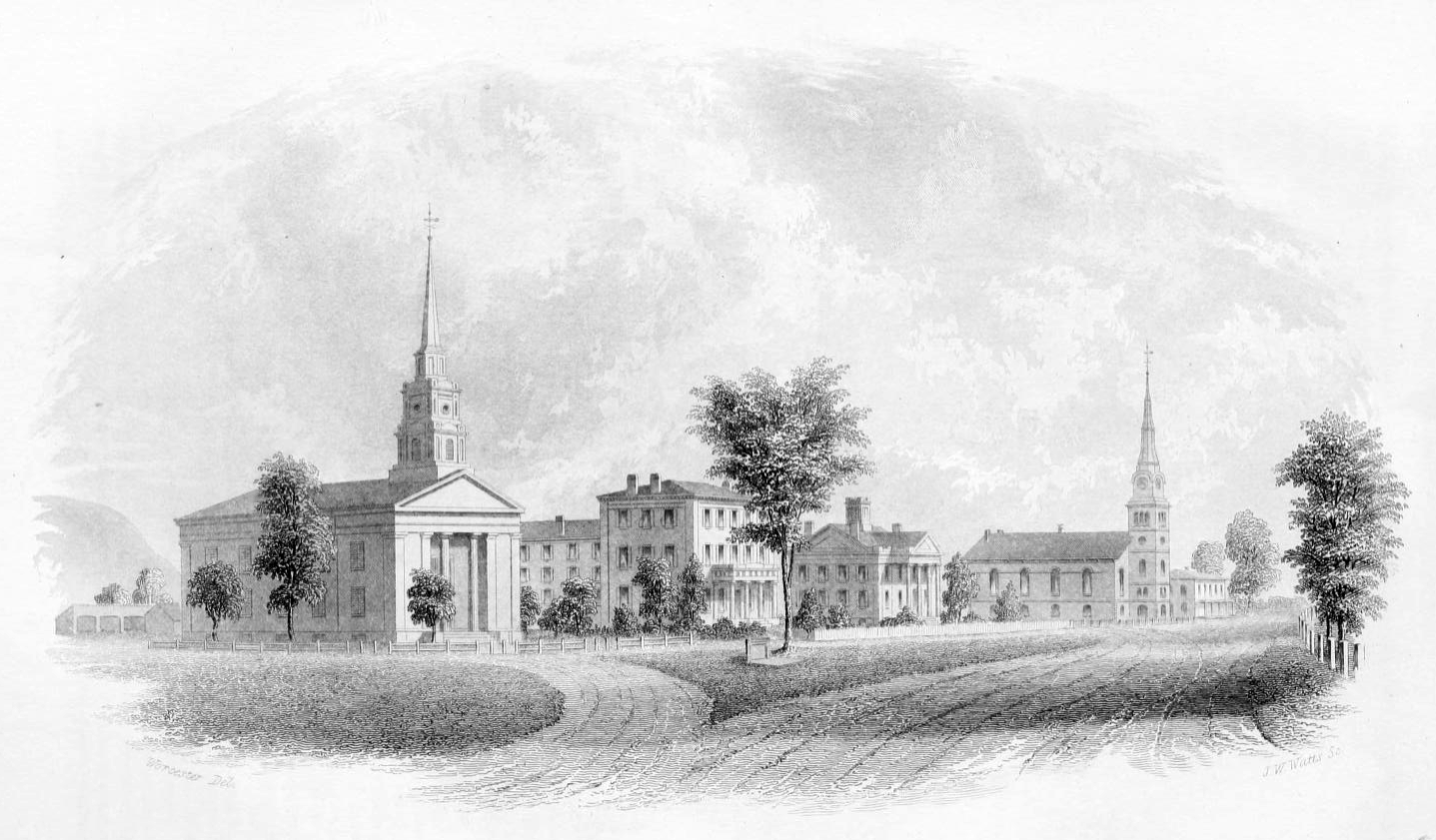
The Williston Seminary in 1856, where Tibbits attended school before Williams College.

John Arnold Tibbits was born on February 19, 1844, to John W. and Fanny Tibbits (née Chappell) in New London, Connecticut. His mother died when he was an infant, and Tibbits was raised by his family members. (Note: Sources are contradictory as to which family members primarily raised Tibbits; some claim his stepmother, while others claim his grandmother.) After initially attending Bartlett High School in New London, Tibbits went to Williston Seminary in Easthampton, Massachusetts. He matriculated to Williams College in 1860, and joined the Kappa Alpha Society the same year. He stayed at Williams for less than a year, leaving to study law in New London.

On July 12, 1862, due to the start of the American Civil War, Tibbits enlisted in the 14th Connecticut Infantry Regiment, becoming an orderly sergeant. He first engaged in combat on September 17, 1862, at the Battle of Antietam, where he was wounded in both hands; as a result, he lost use of his left hand. After recovering from his injuries, Tibbits was promoted to second lieutenant of Company F on December 15, 1862, and fought at the battles of Chancellorsville and Gettysburg, where he sustained another injury to the right arm and was subsequently honorably discharged. Later, after re-enlisting, he served under George Armstrong Custer with the Army of the Potomac's cavalry in the Valley campaigns of 1864, and was promoted to captain on May 28, 1864. Seven days before his final honorable discharge on July 31, 1865, Tibbits was brevetted the rank of major.

== Career ==
When he returned to New London at the end of the Civil War, Tibbits became an editor of David S. Ruddock's New London Morning Star until 1872. In 1873, as Ruddock was struggling with health issues and unable to publish the Star and his other newspaper, the New London Democrat, Tibbits began to write his own newspapers, the Evening Telegram and Connecticut Gazette, to replace them respectively; both ceased publishing in 1909.

In 1866, after the Civil War, Tibbits finished his law studies with Augustus Brandegee. Tibbits and Thomas M. Waller established a law firm when Tibbits entered private practice, and were both elected to represent New London in the Connecticut House of Representatives in 1872. Tibbits served in multiple roles in the Connecticut General Assembly, first as an assistant clerk of the Connecticut House of Representatives in 1868, ascending to Clerk of the House the following year, and became Clerk of the state Senate the year after that. Tibbits was elected to the Connecticut House of Representatives in 1872 and 1885, representing New London; subsequently, on January 5, 1886, he was elected Speaker of the Connecticut House of Representatives. Tibbits was also a delegate to the 1876 Republican National Convention and campaigned across the country for multiple Republican presidential candidates.

From 1872 to 1878, Tibbits was the judge advocate of Connecticut's Third Regimental District, and also was a judge for the City Court of New London. Additionally, Tibbits was on the New London Board of Education and served as city attorney. He served as the Government Director of the Union Pacific Railroad during Ulysses S. Grant's second term, as well as the Collector of the Port of New London under both the Hayes and Arthur administrations.

On July 2, 1881, Tibbits, along with John C. Turner (a colleague from the publishing company Tibbits established to replace Ruddock's businesses) and John McGinley, began The Day, under the company John A. Tibbits & Co., located at 52 Bank Street in what is now the Downtown New London Historic District. Tibbits was the editor and publisher of the newspaper and wrote several reports; his family sold The Day to Theodore Bodenwein, who used to work for the paper, in 1891. Tibbits also was involved in real estate and insurance in New London.

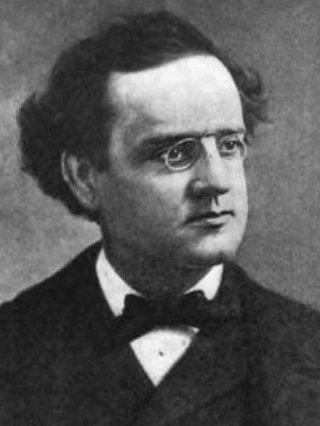
Thomas M. Waller, who ran in the 1882 Connecticut gubernatorial election as a Democrat; Tibbits heavily criticized Waller but later re-established a law firm with him.

Tibbits and Waller, his law firm partner, eventually fell out and discontinued their legal partnership. Tibbits, as a Republican, criticized Waller and his candidacy as a Democrat in the 1882 Connecticut gubernatorial election, accusing him of hypocrisy and betraying the working class. Eventually, Tibbits, Waller, and Waller's son, Tracey, established another law firm in spite of their political differences, which lasted until on August 18, 1887, as the group became separated geographically. Waller won his campaign and served as governor of Connecticut until president Grover Cleveland appointed him to serve as consul to Bradford, England, in 1885. Although Tibbits ran for the Republican nomination in the 1886 Connecticut gubernatorial election, Phineas C. Lounsbury, who eventually won the election, was nominated instead. President Benjamin Harrison would later, in 1889, nominate Tibbits to the same consular position as Waller. Tibbits left his post and went back to New London in 1893.

== Personal life and death ==
Tibbits was a Roman Catholic convert. He married his wife, Lydia Dennis, on February 18, 1869; the two had one son, John Dennis Tibbits.

Tibbits suffered from Bright's disease, and died on July 22, 1893, in New London, Connecticut, after an illness. He was buried in Cedar Grove Cemetery.
