= Prospect Point Camp =

- U.S. National Register of Historic Places
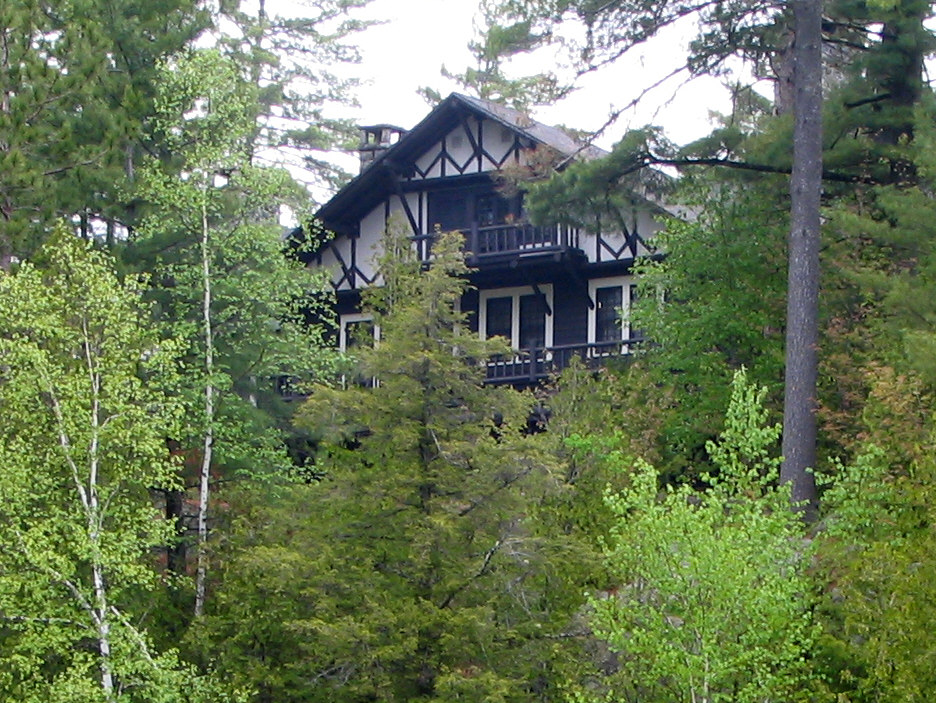
- Prospect Point Camp from Upper Saranac Lake
- Nearest city: Saranac Inn, New York
- Built: 1903
- Architect: William L. Coulter
- MPS: Great Camps of the Adirondacks TR
- NRHP reference No.: 86002947
- Added to NRHP: November 7, 1986

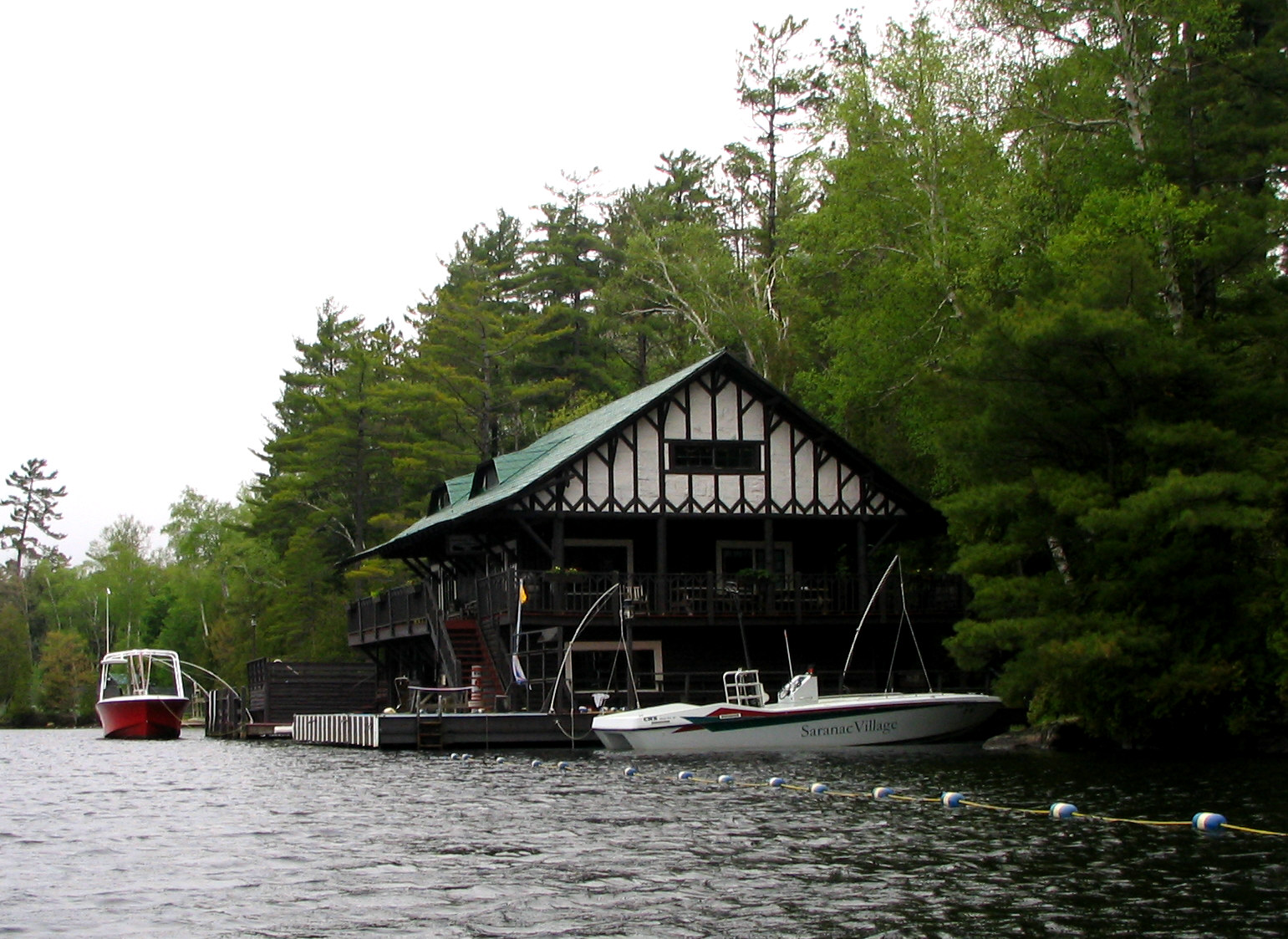
Prospect Point boathouse

Prospect Point Camp (now known as Saranac Village - A Young Life Camp) is an Adirondack Great Camp notable for its unusual chalets inspired by hunting lodges. William L. Coulter's design is a significant example of the Adirondack Rustic style. It is located on a bluff overlooking the northern reaches of Upper Saranac Lake, near Eagle Island Camp and Moss Ledge, two other Coulter designs. Its grand scale is typical of the opulent camps of the area in the great camp era. The camp was built for New York copper magnate and financier Adolph Lewisohn.

In a departure from the tendency of camps to be sheltered in the woods, Prospect Point Camp towers over its shoreline, approached by several broad flights of steps from the water. The main lodge is a three-story chalet with a half-timbered effect, with birch bark filling the role usually played by brick or stucco. Birch bark is also used as a ceiling treatment between the beams. Interior walls were finished with local spruce, but also with southern pine, stained green or tan. The boathouse was the largest on the lake. The camp had a gasoline-powered generator, and telephones throughout.

In the 1940s, the camp was sold, and had a brief career as a lodge, Sekon in the Pines. It was sold again in 1951, and used as a summer camp for young Jewish girls. In 1969, it was purchased by Young Life, a Christian non-denominational ministry based in Colorado Springs, Colorado, who use it for one-week-long educational camping sessions. Saranac Village celebrated its 50th anniversary of Young Life camping in August 2020.

The camp was included in a multiple property submission of 10 camps for listing on the National Register of Historic Places, and was itself listed in 1986.

== Sources ==
- Gilborn, Craig. Adirondack Camps: Homes Away from Home, 1850-1950. Blue Mountain Lake, NY: Adirondack Museum; Syracuse: Syracuse University Press, 2000.
