= Moss Ledge =

- U.S. National Register of Historic Places
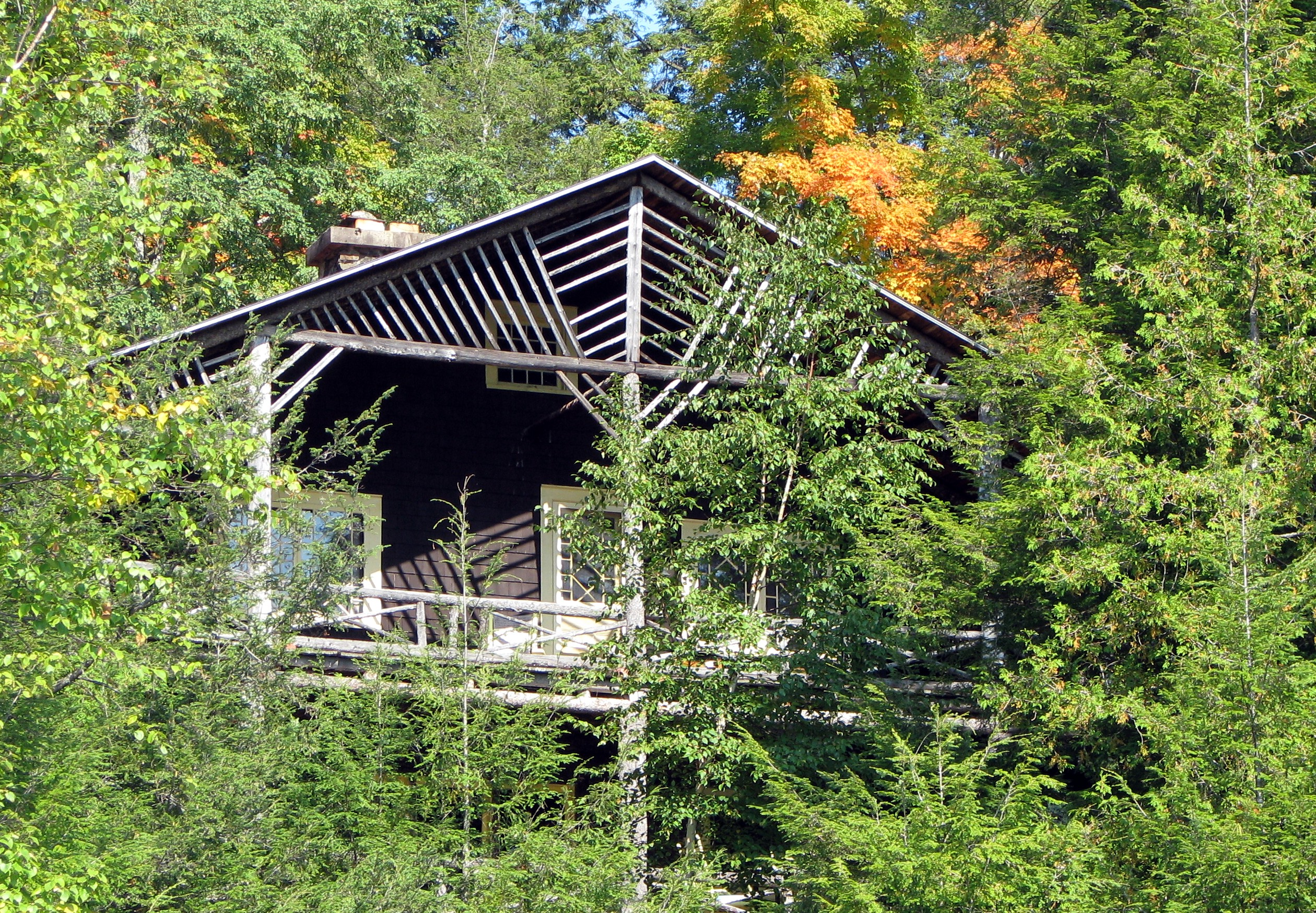
- Moss Ledge, from Upper Saranac Lake
- Nearest city: Saranac Inn, New York
- Built: 1898
- Architect: William L. Coulter
- MPS: Great Camps of the Adirondacks TR
- NRHP reference No.: 86002942
- Added to NRHP: November 7, 1986

Moss Ledge is an Adirondack Great Camp designed by William L. Coulter in 1898 for Isabel Ballantine of New York City. Ballantine was the granddaughter of Newark beer baron, John Holmes Ballantine.

The camp was one of Coulter's first commissions after moving to Saranac Lake in hope of a cure for his tuberculosis. The camp is located on Upper Saranac Lake near two other Coulter Great Camps, Prospect Point Camp and Eagle Island Camp.

The name is taken from a nearby rocky, moss-covered ledge that still is a notable feature of the shoreline. The camp consists of a main lodge, guest house, dining hall, boat house, and, some distance from the rest, a tea house built on a promontory overlooking the lake. The buildings are constructed of unpeeled logs; some are notched-corner style log cabins, others are shingles over plank walls. The style is similar to nearby Camp Pinebrook, another Coulter design.

The camp was given to Syracuse University in 1948. It is now in private hands.

The camp was included in a multiple property submission for listing on the National Register of Historic Places and was listed in 1986.

== Sources ==
- Kaiser, Harvey. Great Camps of the Adirondacks. Boston: David R. Godine, 1982.
