= Church of the Ascension (Saranac Inn, New York) =

Historic church in Saranac Inn, New York, US

- U.S. National Register of Historic Places
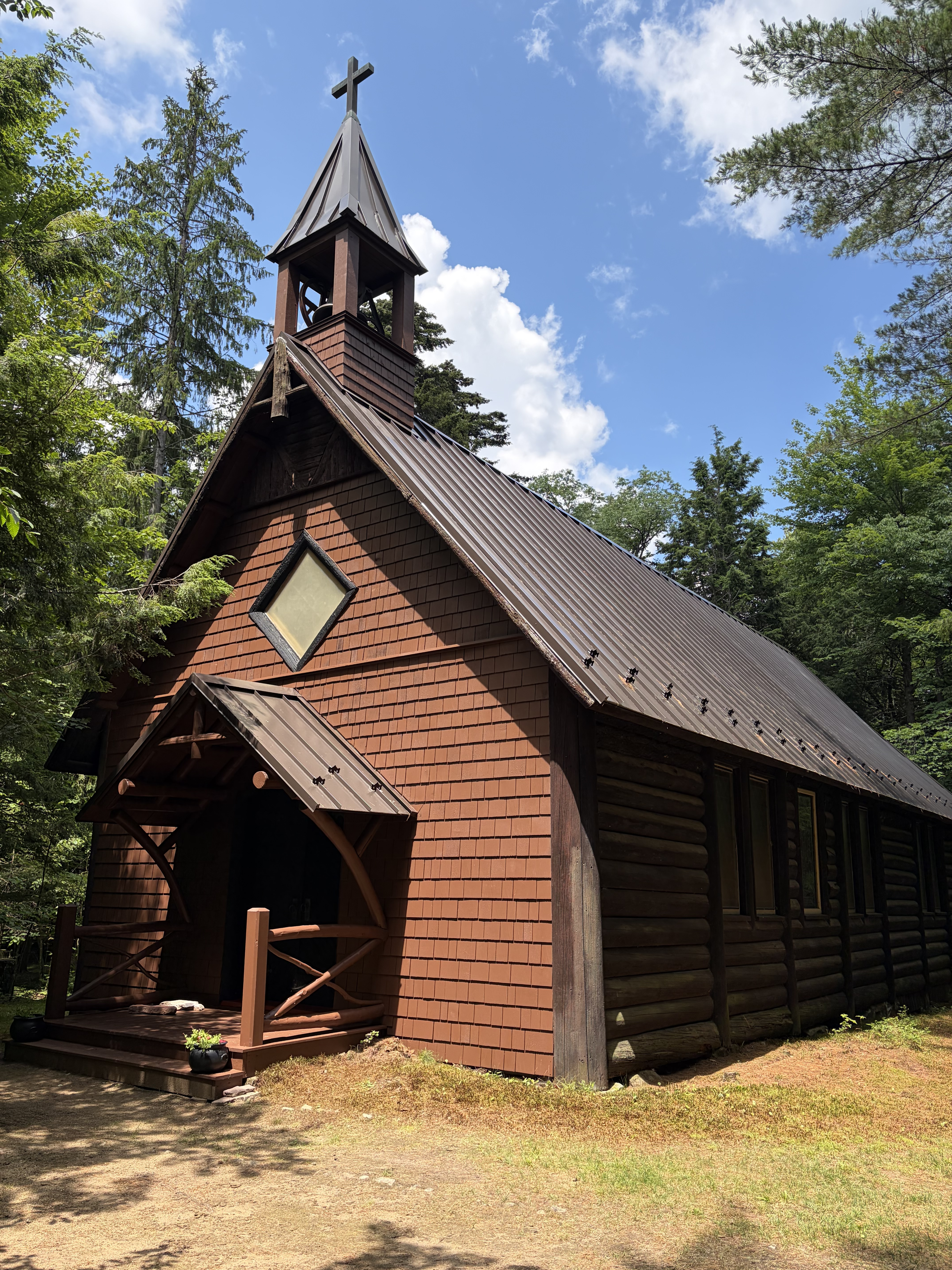
- Church of the Ascension in 2026

- Location within New York Location within the United States
- Location: 32 and 81 Cty. Rd. 46, Saranac Inn, New York
- Coordinates: 44.3448°N 74.3246°W
- Built: 1884
- Architectural style: Gothic Revival; rustic Adirondack
- NRHP reference No.: 100007097
- Added to NRHP: November 8, 2021

The Church of the Ascension is a historic inter-denominational log church located at Saranac Inn in the town of Santa Clara, New York. Initial services were held in the Episcopal tradition were held at the Prospect House (later known as Saranac Inn) during the summer tourist season. A church for the services was built on the shore of Upper Saranac Lake in 1884.

The log church was designed by the firm of D. & J. Jardine in New York City; in 1888, the Jardine firm prepared an uncompleted design to expand the church with a log bell tower, using logs for buttresses. The church was expanded in 1903. A rectory and boathouse for the minister were added in 1906.

The church building and its rectory were listed on the National Register of Historic Places in 2021. As of 2026, it continued to hold weekly services during the summer in the Anglican tradition of morning prayer and holy communion.
