= St. Regis Mountain Fire Observation Station =

- U.S. National Register of Historic Places
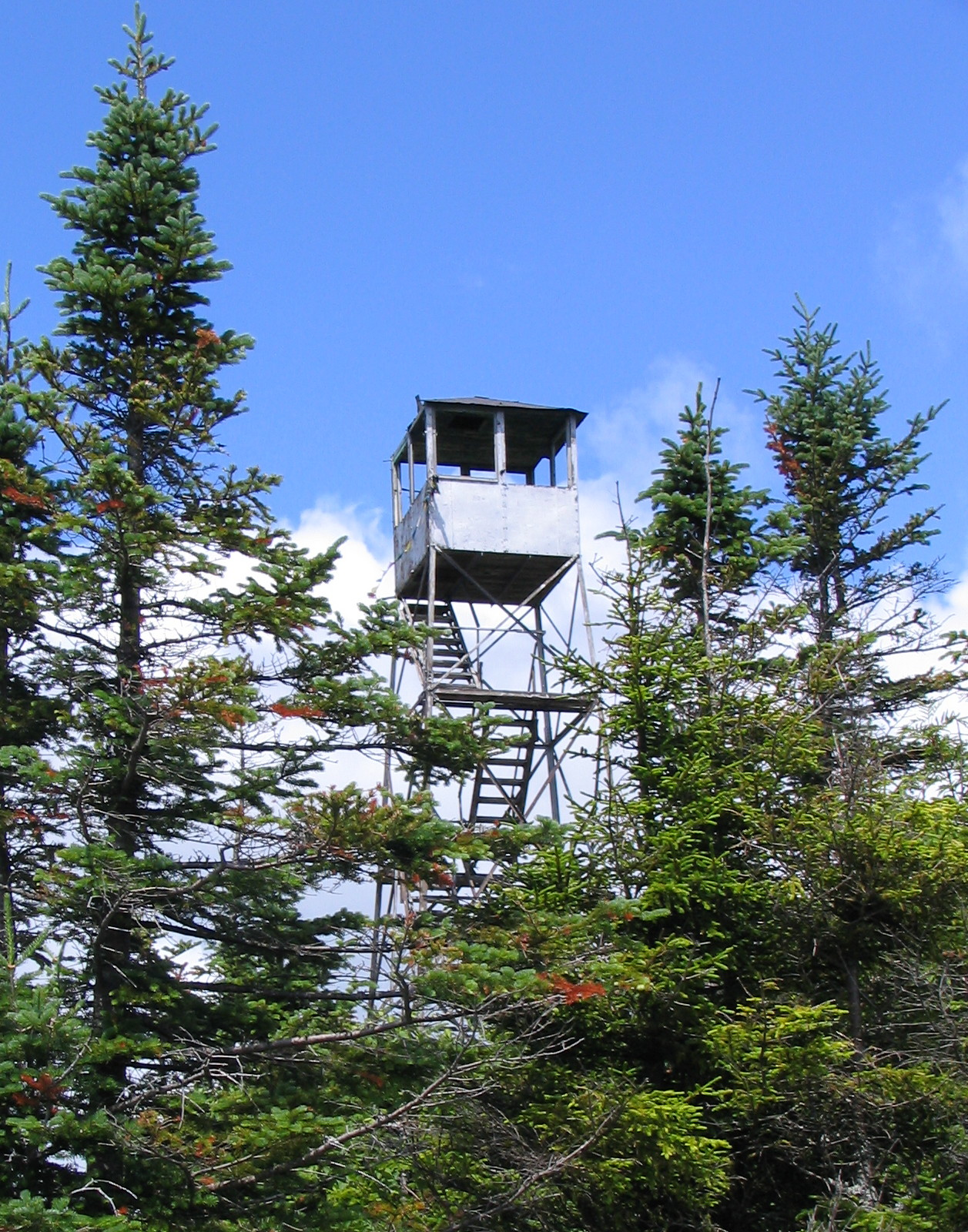
- Saint Regis Mountain fire tower, July 2007

- Location within New York Location within the United States
- Location: St. Regis Mountain, Santa Clara, New York
- Coordinates: 44°24′50″N 74°18′55″W
- Area: 3.3 acres (1.3 ha)
- Built: 1918
- Architect: Aermotor Corporation
- MPS: Fire Observation Stations of New York State Forest Preserve MPS
- NRHP reference No.: 05000163
- Added to NRHP: March 15, 2005

The St. Regis Mountain Fire Observation Station is a historic fire observation station located on Saint Regis Mountain at Santa Clara in Franklin County, New York. The station and contributing resources include a 35-foot-tall (11 m), steel frame lookout tower erected in 1918, the site of the former observer's cabin, and 9/10 of a mile foot trail between the cabin site and summit. The tower is a prefabricated structure built by the Aermotor Corporation and provided a front line of defense in preserving the Adirondack Forest Preserve from the hazards of forest fires.

It was added to the National Register of Historic Places in 2005.

The tower was restored by a friends group that formed in 2013, and the tower was re-opened to the public in September 2016.
