= Echo Camp =

Coordinates: 43°49′26″N 74°38′09″W

- U.S. National Register of Historic Places
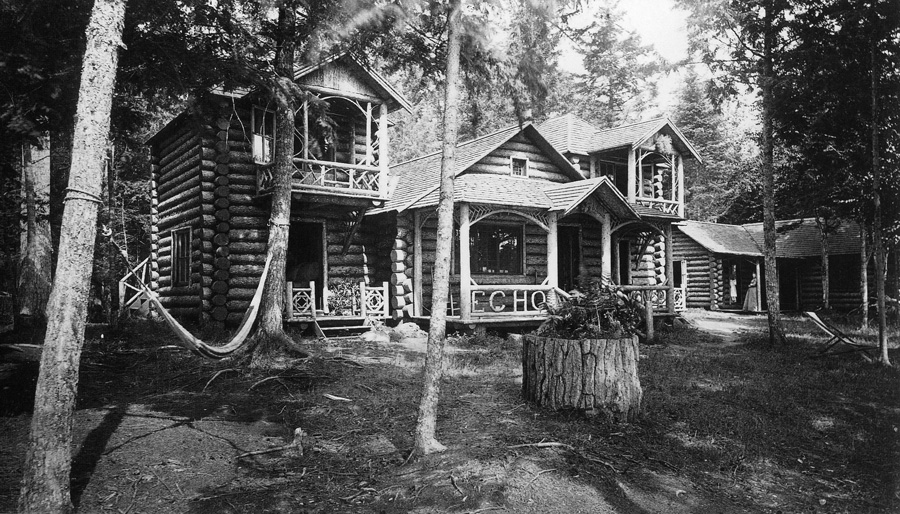
- Main Lodge, 1916, S R Stoddard

- Location within New York Location within the United States
- Nearest city: Raquette Lake, New York
- Built: 1883
- Architect: Charles H. Blanchard
- MPS: Great Camps of the Adirondacks TR
- NRHP reference No.: 86002939
- Added to NRHP: November 7, 1986

Echo Camp is an Adirondack Great Camp on the tip of Long Point adjacent to Camp Pine Knot on Raquette Lake. It was used as a private girls' camp from the mid-1940s to the mid-1980s. It was sold in 1986, and is now a privately owned summer residence.

Built for Connecticut governor Phineas C. Lounsbury in 1883, its design bears the influence of William West Durant. Its main buildings were nearly identical with those of two other nearby camps built in 1880, Camp Fairview, built on Osprey Island by cousin C. W Durant Jr., and The Cedars, built by cousin Frederick Durant on nearby Forked Lake. Neither is still standing, though they are preserved in photographs by Seneca Ray Stoddard and Edward Bierstadt (elder brother of Albert Bierstadt).

Like other Durant camps, Echo Camp is built of locally felled logs, with separate buildings for each function. The main lodge consists of a one-floor log hall flanked by twin two-story log towers, giving a villa-like appearance. Interiors are sheathed in polished planks and narrow wainscoting, rooms are lightened by large, half-round clerestory windows, and twig work decorates verandas and eves. Some buildings have applied cedar bark sheathing, still remarkably intact.

The camp was included in a multiple property submission for listing on the National Register of Historic Places and was listed in 1986.

== Sources ==
- Gilborn, Craig. Adirondack Camps: Homes Away from Home, 1850–1950. Blue Mountain Lake, NY: Adirondack Museum; Syracuse: Syracuse University Press, 2000.
- Kaiser, Harvey. Great Camps of the Adirondacks. Boston: David R. Godine, 1982.
