= The Day (New London) =

Newspaper in New London, Connecticut, US

- Type: Daily newspaper
- Owner: The Day Publishing Company
- Founder: John A. Tibbits
- Publisher: Tim Dwyer
- Editor: Izaskun E. Larrañeta
- Managing editor: Karen Florin
- Founded: July 1881
- Language: English
- Headquarters: New London, Connecticut
- Circulation: 15,500
- ISSN: 0744-0499
- Website: www.theday.com
- Free online archives: The Day

The Day, formerly known as The New London Day, is a local newspaper based in New London, Connecticut, published by The Day Publishing Company. The newspaper has won Newspaper of the Year and the Best Daily Newspaper Award from the New England Newspaper & Press Association (NENPA). It has twice won the Horace Greeley Award for "courage and outstanding effectiveness in serving the public." It has won the American Society of Newspaper Editors Example of Excellence in Small Newspaper award and the Columbia Journalism Review has listed it as one of the top 100 newspapers in the country with a circulation of less than 100,000 copies.

== History ==
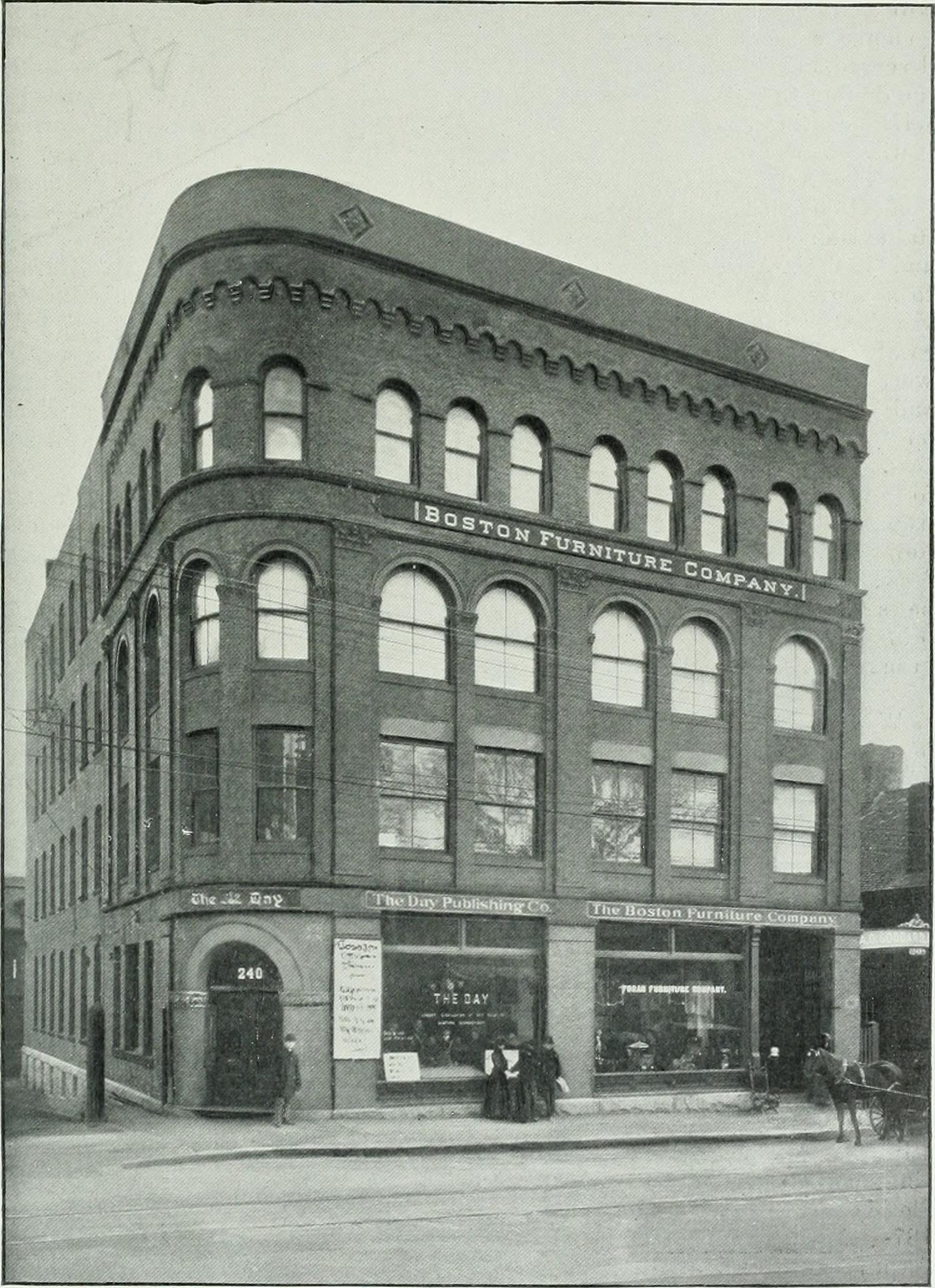
The Day Building (Former home of The Day) Bank St. 1901

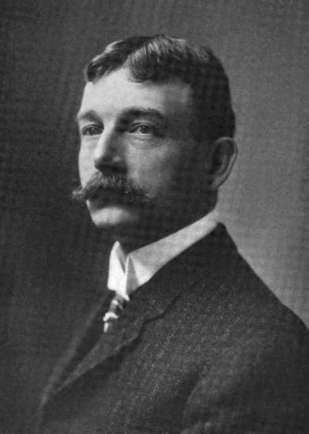
Theodore Bodenwein

The Day was founded in July 1881 as a mouthpiece of the local Republican Party in an era when many American newspapers served political parties. It was owned by a wealthy mercantile family in New London. In 1889, the original publisher, Maj. John A. Tibbits, left the paper to take a government post in England. The paper struggled for a few years until the family convinced Theodore Bodenwein to purchase the paper. He purchased it in 1891, agreeing to change his political affiliation to Republican in order to secure a loan to purchase the paper. He remained the publisher until his death in 1939.

Pat Richardson served as publisher from 2018 until her departure less than a year later in early 2019. She was succeeded by Tim Dwyer, who previously was executive editor. In addition to The Day, The Day Publishing Co. runs several weekly newspapers mostly along the shoreline in southern Connecticut.

The paper endorsed Democratic Party candidate Senator Barack Obama for President of the United States in the 2008 election cycle, and Hillary Clinton in 2016.

Ever since the death of Theodore Bodenwein, whose tenure started in 1888, The Day has been held in public trust, and is still independent. The Day Trust devotes its attention to operating the newspaper and supporting a charitable foundation, the Bodenwein Public Benevolent Foundation. This arrangement ensures that the newspaper will remain independent and locally owned and that profits from the newspaper will be distributed to non-profit organizations within The Day's primary circulation area.

In September 2018, The Day implemented a change in their online commenting policy that required paid subscribers using screen names to comment on articles on theday.com website using their real names instead of aliases or screen names.

In July 2025, the paper eliminated eight positions, including three in the newsroom. Several editions were also shrunk with some sections merged.

== Awards ==
In October 2010, The New England Newspaper & Press Association (NENPA) recognized The Day as its Newspaper of the Year for its weekday edition and Newspaper of the Year for its Sunday edition in the 25,000 to 40,000 circulation category.

The Day also received NENPA's Publick Occurrences award in recognition "of outstanding journalism in 2010 for flood coverage" that included its print, photographic and web component in theday.com. The recognition came for coverage of the flooding in late March and early April that devastated many communities in southeastern Connecticut and southern Rhode Island.

In December 2009, theday.com was recognized as New England's Website of the Year. That same year, reporter Lee Howard won the Theodore Driscoll Investigative Reporting Award for a series of stories about H1-B visa abuses.

The Day's multimedia producer Peter Huoppi earned two Regional Emmy Awards in May 2010 for its multimedia series,"The Deaf Kid Who Played Rock n Roll" reported by Joe Wojtas; and "Stories of the Silent Service" reported by Jennifer Grogan.

In 2012, political reporter JC Reindl won the Theodore Driscoll award for an article that raised questions about Connecticut's investment in the ticket resale company TicketNetwork. And Editorial Page Editor Paul Choiniere took home the First Amendment Award for a series of editorials on freedom of information issues.

In August 2018, the paper was one of 18 newspapers nationally to win grants from Poynter's Community Listening and Engagement fund. There have been 52 recipients of the grant total.
