= Seneca Ray Stoddard =

American photographer (1844–1917)

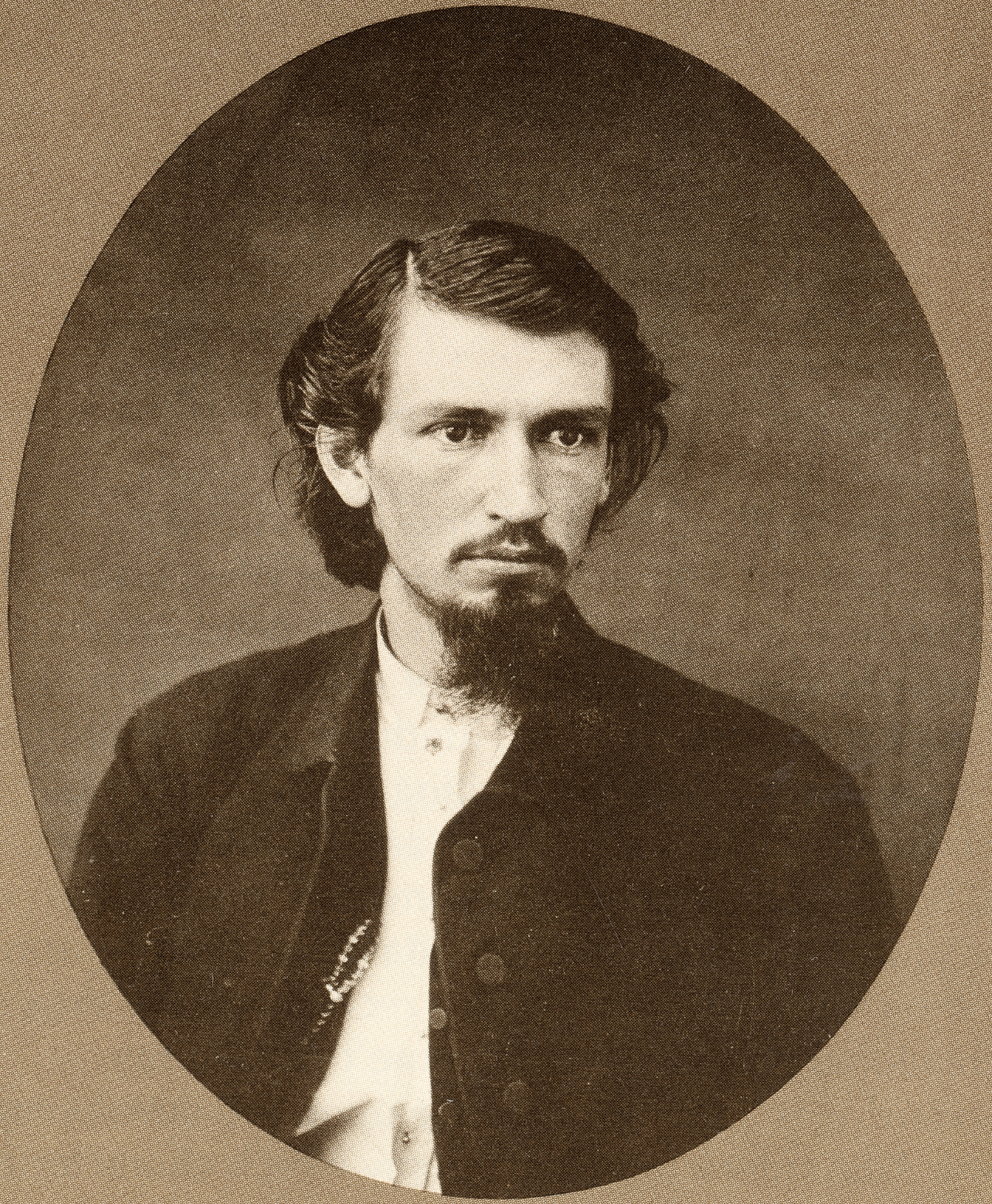
- An early self-portrait of S. R. Stoddard
- Born: May 13, 1844; Wilton, Saratoga County, New York
- Died: April 26, 1917 (aged 72); Glens Falls, New York
- Occupation: Landscape photographer
- Known for: Photographs of New York's Adirondack Mountains

Seneca Ray Stoddard (1844–1917) was an American landscape photographer known for his photographs of New York's Adirondack Mountains. He was also a naturalist, a writer, a poet, an artist, and a cartographer. His writings and photographs helped to popularize the Adirondacks.

== Biography ==
Stoddard was born at Wilton, in Saratoga County, New York, May 13, 1844, son of Charles Stanley Stoddard and Julia Ann Ray. He was largely self-taught. He left home at 16 and got work painting ornamental freight cars and decorative scenes in passenger cars. He started in photography at age 20, initially in Glens Falls and later throughout the Adirondacks. He published a guide to Saratoga Springs followed by Lake George - Luzerne - Schroon Lake in 1873, and revised each of the subsequent five years. In 1878 the guide was expanded to Lake George and Lake Champlain.

He was best known for his guidebook, The Adirondacks: Illustrated, published in 1873, revised and reprinted through 1914, and the first tourist map of the Adirondacks, published in 1874. In 1878, Stoddard produced a topographical survey of the Adirondacks. In 1882 Stoddard invented "a camera attachment for use in dry-plate photography and to perfect the -magnesium flash- for taking night photographs." In early 1892, he was invited to give an illustrated lecture to the New York State Legislature that was influential in the creation of the Adirondack Park.

He traveled extensively, to Alaska in 1892, Florida and Cuba in 1894 followed by the American west and southwest. In 1895, he traveled to Bermuda, the Holy Lands, Italy, Switzerland, and France. In 1897, he went to England and the Orkney, Shetland and Faroe Islands, Iceland, Norway, Denmark, Germany and Russia. His trips became the basis for illustrated lecture tours, and photographic travel books, The Cruise of the Friesland and The Midnight Sun. In 1906, he started Stoddard's Northern Monthly, a short-lived magazine that featured articles on the Adirondacks, fiction and foreign travel.

Stoddard died at his home in Glens Falls, New York, April 26, 1917, and is interred in Pineview Cemetery.

== Legacy ==
The majority of Stoddard's life work in photographs is split into two large collections, one at the Chapman Historical Museum in Glens Falls, and the other at the Adirondack Experience in Blue Mountain Lake, New York. Other works of his are held in the permanent collections of the Smithsonian American Art Museum, the George Eastman Museum, the San Francisco Museum of Modern Art, the Princeton University Art Museum, the Clark Art Institute, the University of Michigan Museum of Art, the Museum of Fine Arts, Houston, the Los Angeles County Museum of Art, and the Brooklyn Museum.

== Gallery ==
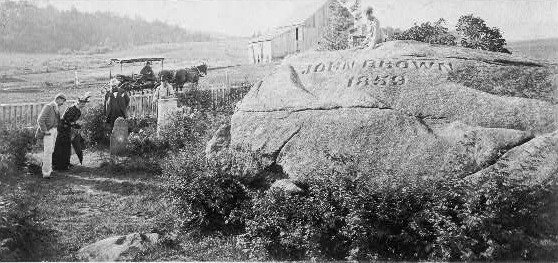
John Brown's Grave - 1896

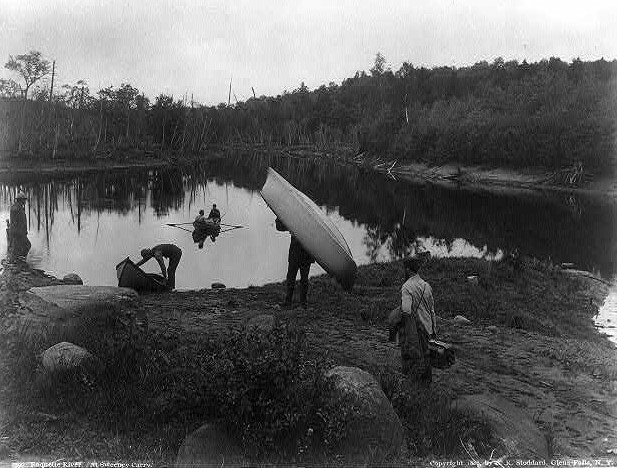
Raquette River - at Sweeney Carry

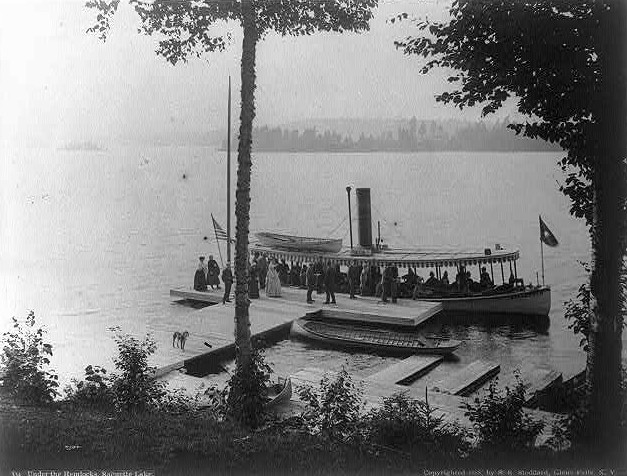
Under the hemlocks - Raquette Lake, 1888

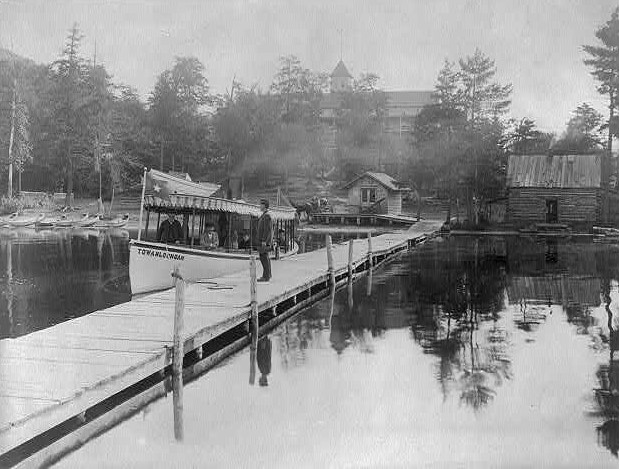
The Small steamboat Towahloondah,1889

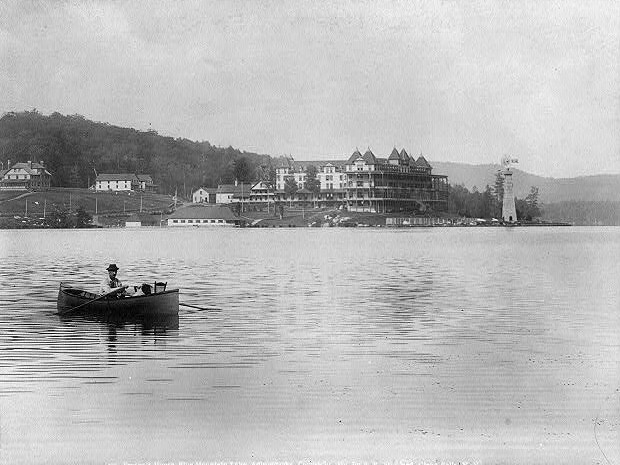
Prospect House, Blue Mountain Lake, 1889

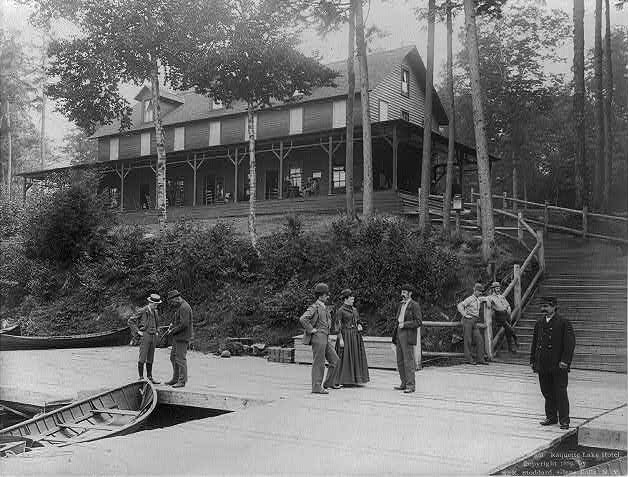
Raquette Lake Hotel, 1889

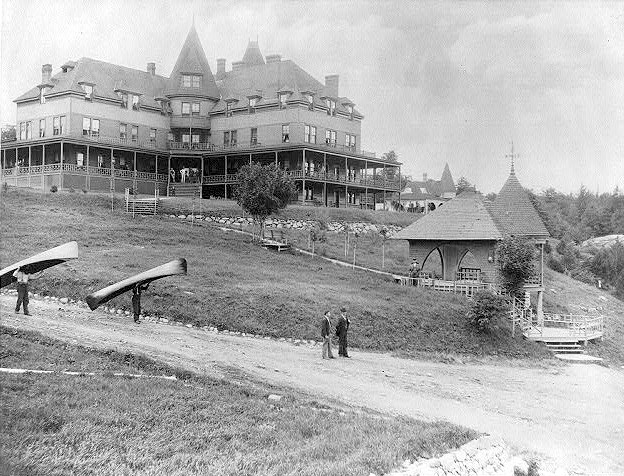
Hotel Wawbeek - Upper Saranac Lake, 1890

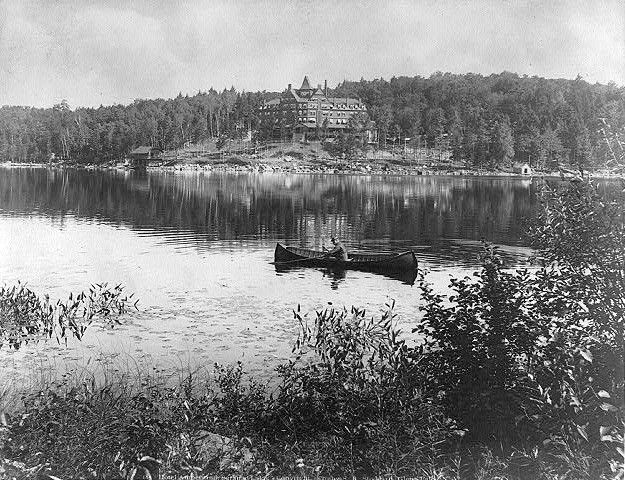
Hotel Ampersand, Upper Saranac Lake, 1890

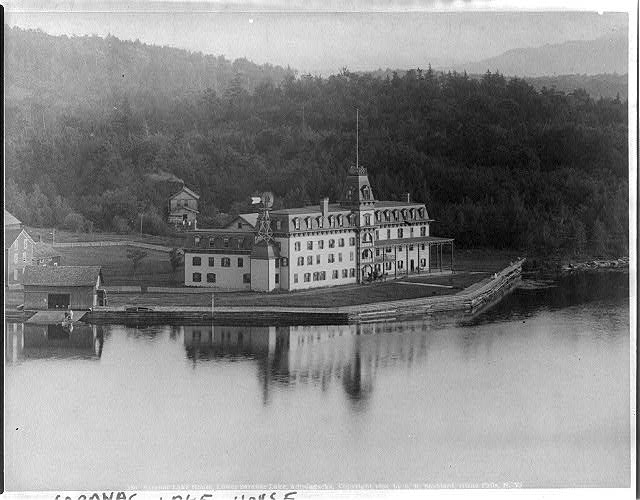
Saranac Lake House, 1890

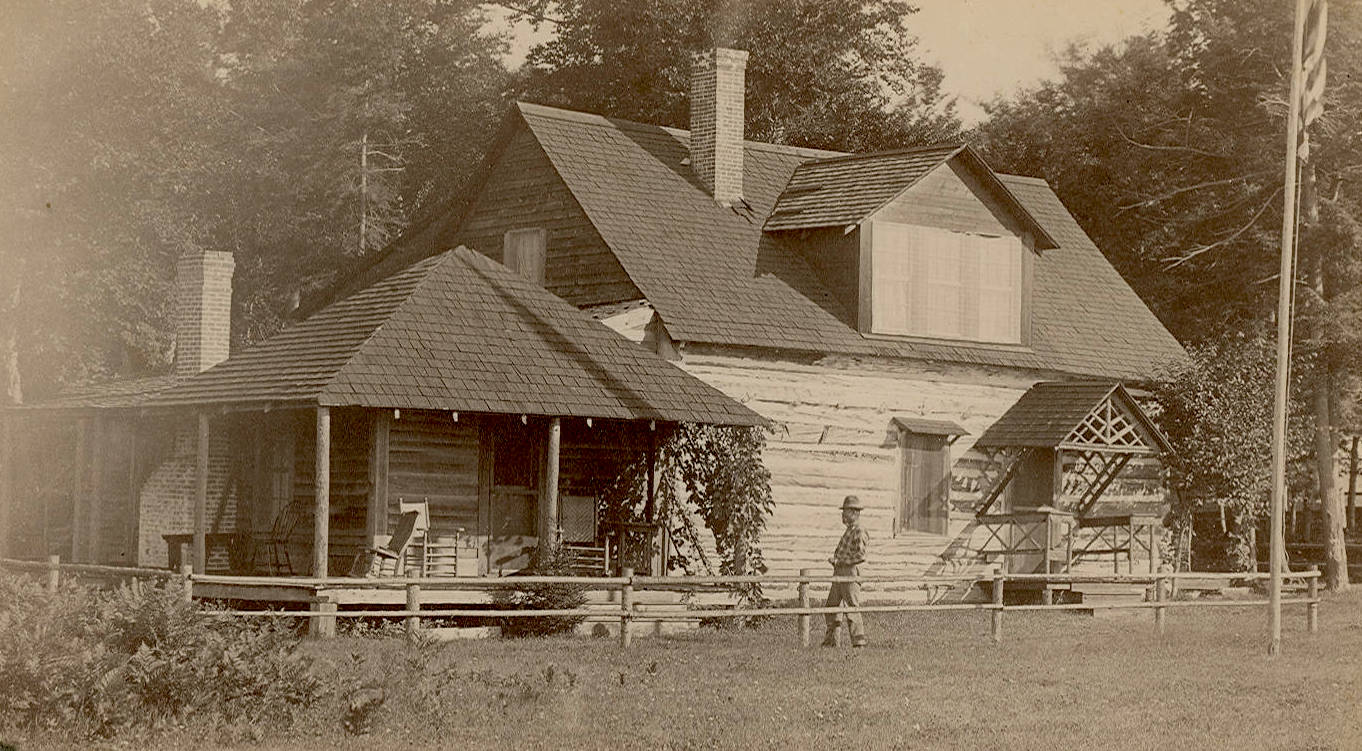
Cleveland Cottage - Saranac Inn

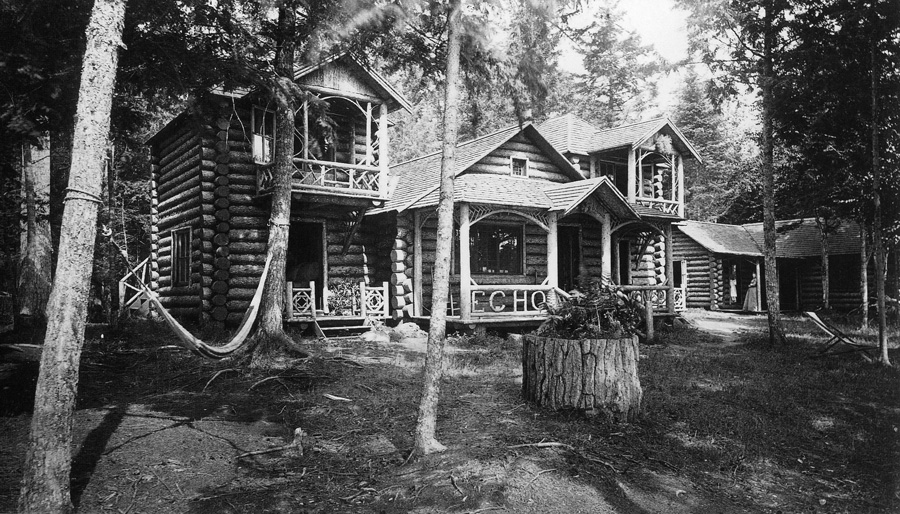
Echo Camp, Raquette Lake, 1916

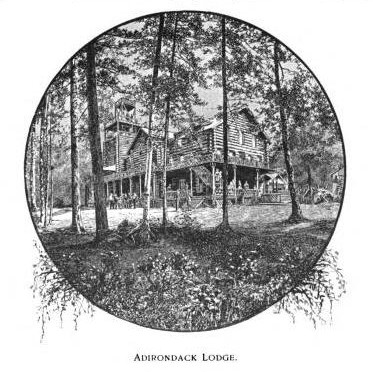
Adirondack Loj, North Elba, New York, 1893

== Sources ==
- De Sormo, Maitland C., Summers on the Saranacs. Utica: North Country Books, 1980. ISBN 0-932052-87-8.
- Donaldson, Alfred L., A History of the Adirondacks. New York: Century, 1921. ISBN 0-916346-26-9. (reprint)
