= William L. Coulter =

American architect

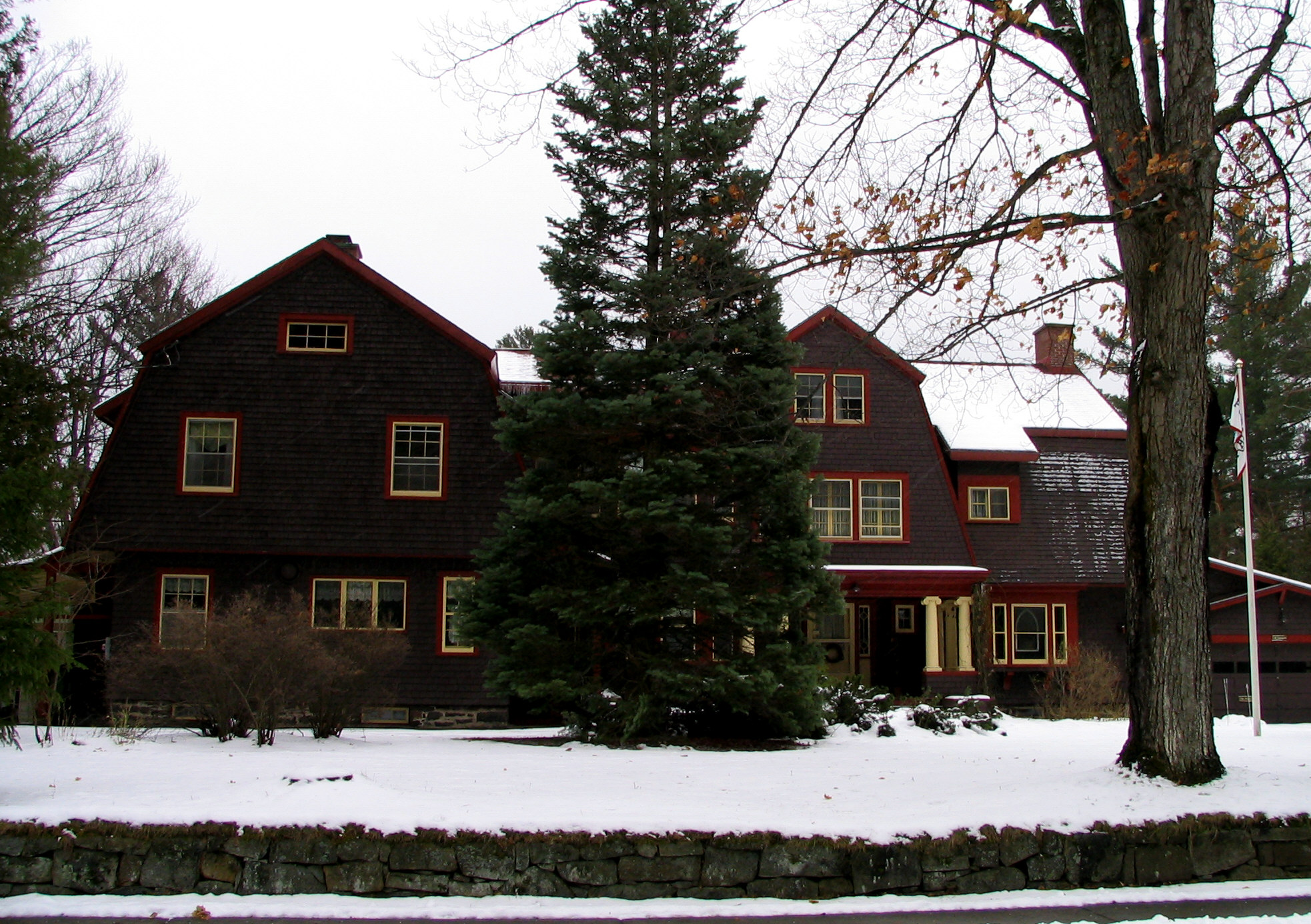
147 Park Avenue, Saranac Lake, called "The Porcupine" because it had so many fine points. It is presently a Bed and Breakfast.

William Lincoln Coulter (1865–1907) was an American architect who came to Saranac Lake, New York, in the spring of 1896 in an effort to cure his tuberculosis, and stayed to design some of the finest Adirondack Great Camps and Cure Cottages in the area. Among the camps he designed were Knollwood Club, Camp Eagle Island and Prospect Point Camp; Camp Eagle Island has been designated a US National Historic Landmark. In Saranac Lake, in 1903, he designed a house at 147 Park Avenue for Thomas Bailey Aldrich, editor of the Atlantic Monthly, that wits dubbed "The Porcupine" because it had so many fine points and belonged to a "quill pusher". He also designed the Coulter Cottage, built between 1897 and 1899.

Coulter was born in Norwich, Connecticut, to William and Hanna Coulter. He worked in an architect's office in New York City starting at 16, while a night student at Cooper Institute. By the time he arrived in Saranac Lake in 1896, he worked for the firm of Renwick, Aspinwall & Renwick and had fifteen years experience in architectural work. His firm sent him north for his health and to help senior partner J. Lawrence Aspinwall, cousin of Dr. Edward L. Trudeau, design additions to the Adirondack Cottage Sanitorium that Trudeau had started in 1884. Within five years, he was working on Swiss chalet style Moss Ledge and rustic Camp Pinebrook on Upper Saranac Lake, the latter for New York Governor Levi P. Morton, and Knollwood Club on Lower Saranac Lake. According to a 1900 newspaper account, his plans had generated more than $600,000 worth of work and kept an "army of workmen" busy.

In 1902, he hired Max H. Westhoff, an experienced architect who soon became his partner. With Westhoff, he produced a number of homes in Saranac Lake and lake camps in the Adirondacks along with two in New Hampshire; he also worked on additions to Paul Smith's Hotel and the Lake Placid Club. Prospect Point Camp, on Upper Saranac Lake, was built for Adolph Lewisohn, for whom they also designed a house in Ardsley and another dwelling in the city.

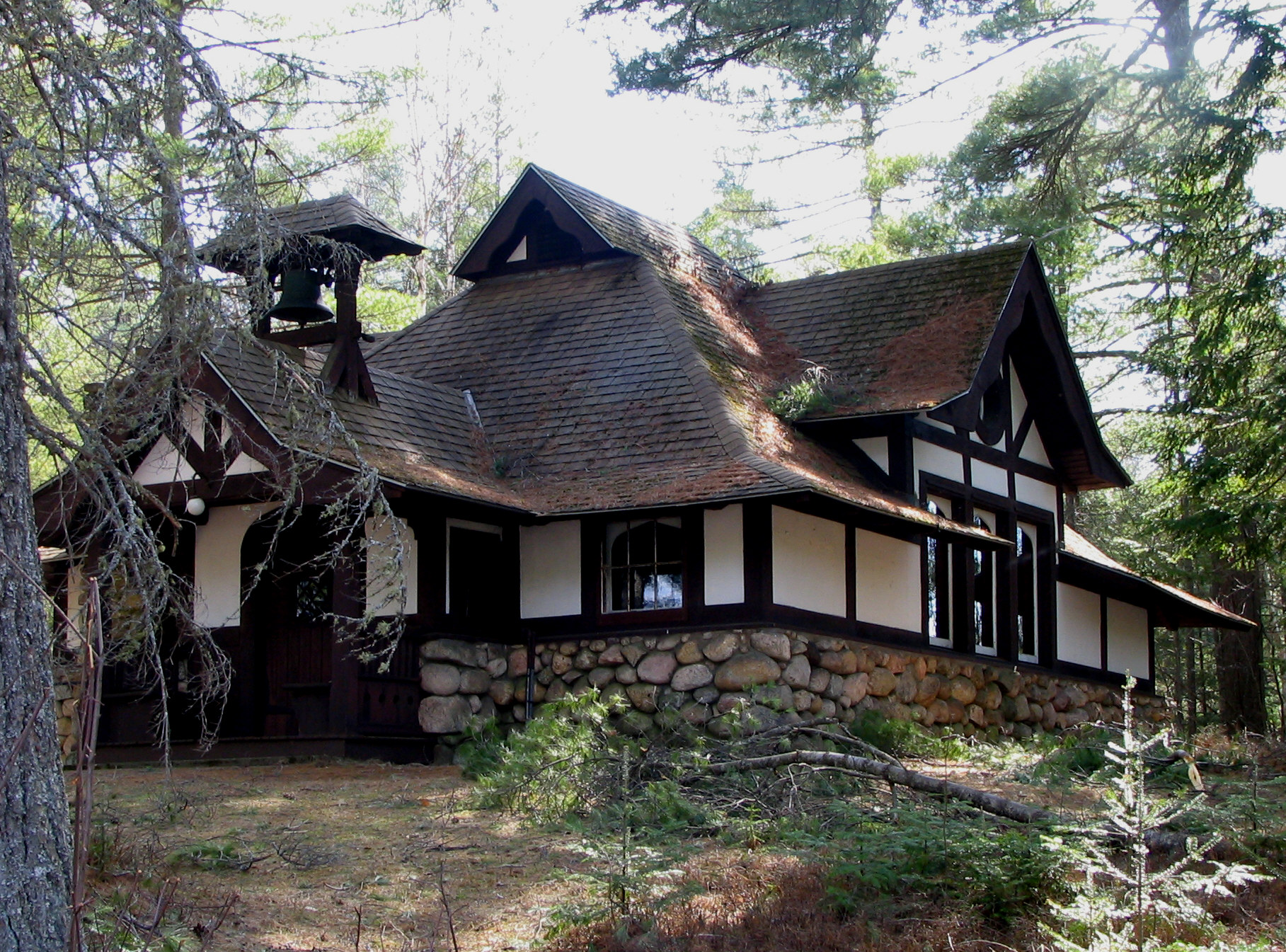
Saint Regis Presbyterian Church, Keese Mill

== Sources ==
- Gallos, Phillip L., Cure Cottages of Saranac Lake, Historic Saranac Lake, 1985, ISBN 0-9615159-0-2.
- Gilborn, Craig. Adirondack Camps: Homes Away from Home, 1850-1950. Blue Mountain Lake, NY: Adirondack Museum; Syracuse: Syracuse University Press, 2000.
