= 1886 Connecticut gubernatorial election =

- November 2, 1886
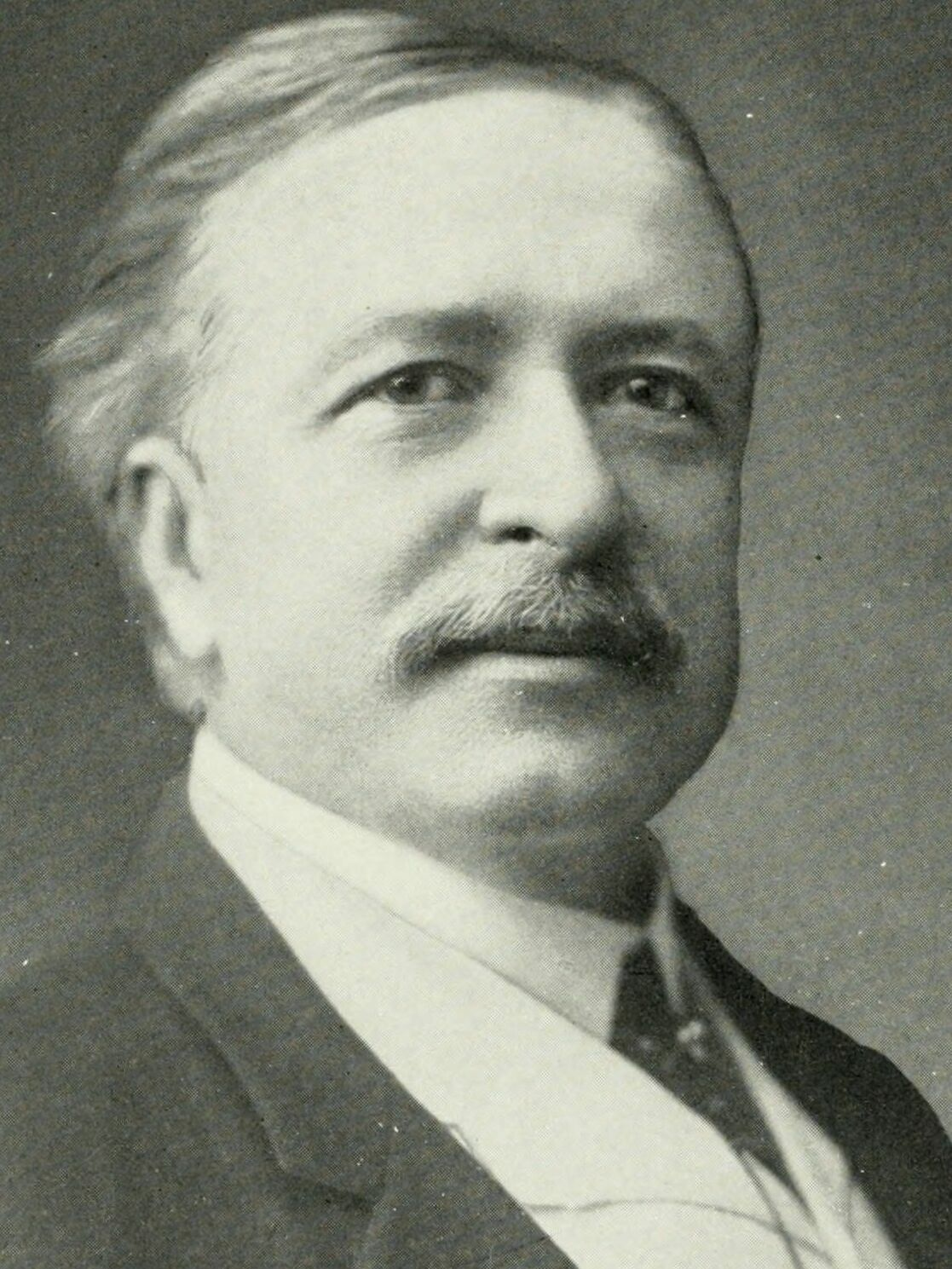

Nominee	Phineas C. Lounsbury	Edward S. Cleveland
Party	Republican	Democratic
Popular vote	56,920	58,818
Percentage	46.19%	47.73%
- Lounsbury: 40–50% 50–60% 60–70% 70–80% Snow: 40–50% 50–60% 60–70% 70–80%
Governor before election
Henry Baldwin Harrison
Republican
Elected Governor
Phineas C. Lounsbury
Republican

The 1886 Connecticut gubernatorial election was held on November 2, 1886. Republican nominee Phineas C. Lounsbury defeated Democratic nominee Edward S. Cleveland, who received 46.18% of the vote, despite Cleveland winning the popular vote with 47.73%. As a result, the Republican-controlled Connecticut General Assembly had to vote for the second consecutive time to elect a governor; The law at the time specified that if no candidate received a majority, the state legislature would decide the election.

== General election ==
=== Candidates ===
Major party candidates

- Phineas C. Lounsbury, Republican
- Edward S. Cleveland, Democratic

Other candidates

- Samuel B. Forbes, Prohibition
- Herbert Baker, Labor

=== Results ===
1886 Connecticut gubernatorial election
Party	Candidate	Votes	%	±%
Democratic	Edward S. Cleveland	58,818	47.73%	
Republican	Phineas C. Lounsbury	56,920	46.19%	
Prohibition	Samuel B. Forbes	4,699	3.81%	
Labor	Herbert Baker	2,792	2.27%	
Plurality		1,898		
Turnout				
Republican hold		Swing		
