= Santa Clara, New York =

- Town
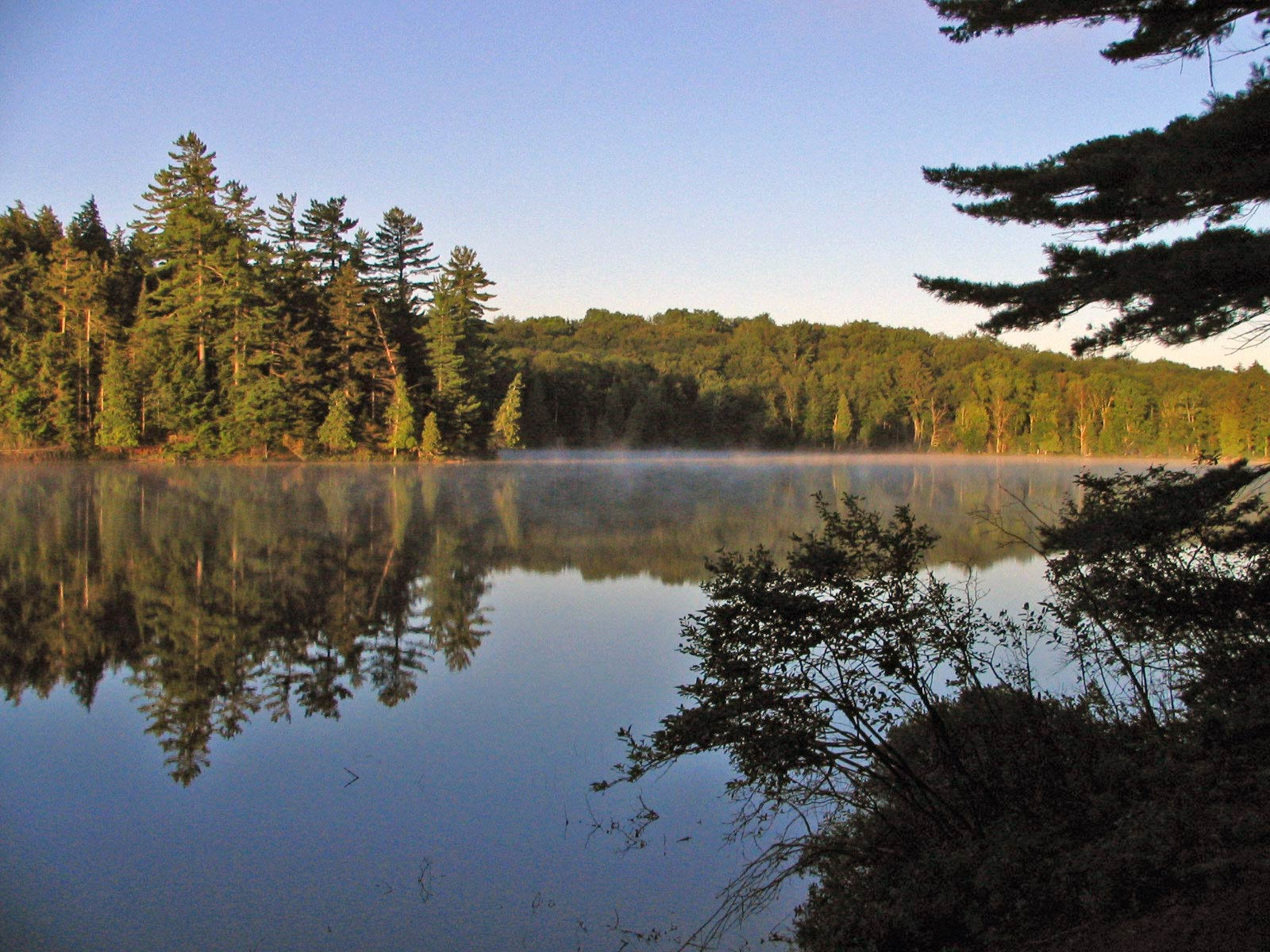
- Long Pond in the Saint Regis Canoe Area

- Location within New York Location within the United States
- Coordinates: 44°24′42″N 74°21′57″W
- Country: United States
- State: New York
- County: Franklin

Government
  - Type: Town Council
  - Town Supervisor: Marcel Webb (R)
  - Town Council: Members' List: • David Perry (R); • Philip S. Durkin (R); • Thomas Chipperfield (R); • Thomas R. Kimpton ()

Area
  - Total: 191.71 sq mi (496.53 km^{2})
  - Land: 174.42 sq mi (451.75 km^{2})
  - Water: 17.29 sq mi (44.79 km^{2})
- Elevation: 1,588 ft (484 m)

Population (2010)
  - Total: 345
  - Estimate (2016): 341
  - Density: 1.9/sq mi (0.75/km^{2})
- Time zone: UTC-5 (Eastern (EST))
  - Summer (DST): UTC-4 (EDT)
- ZIP Codes: 12970 (Paul Smiths); 12980 (Saint Regis Falls); 12983 (Saranac Lake); 12986 (Tupper Lake)
- Area code: 518
- FIPS code: 36-033-65178
- GNIS feature ID: 0979459
- Website: townofsantaclara.com

Santa Clara is a town in Franklin County, New York, United States. The population was 332 at the 2020 census, down from 345 at the 2010 census. The name was derived from the wife of an early town businessman, John Hurd.

The town is in the southwestern part of the county, southwest of the village of Malone and west of the village of Saranac Lake. The town is within the Adirondack Park. It includes the 58 ponds of the Saint Regis Canoe Area, presently the only Canoe Wilderness Area in the park, as well as most of 4,700-acre (19 km^{2}) Upper Saranac Lake.

== History ==
The town of Santa Clara was formed from part of the town of Brandon in 1888. An addition from Brandon was added to Santa Clara in 1896.

William Rockefeller began buying property in the town around 1896 in order to establish an estate, used by members of his family during the summer.

The St. Regis Mountain Fire Observation Station was listed on the National Register of Historic Places in 2005.

== Geography ==
According to the United States Census Bureau, the town has a total area of 191.7 square miles (496.5 km^{2}), of which 174.4 square miles (451.7 km^{2}) is land and 17.3 square miles (44.8 km^{2}), or 9.02%, is water.

Santa Clara is the second largest town in the county. The southern part of the town is dominated by numerous lakes.

New York State Route 458 is a north–south highway in Santa Clara. New York State Route 30 crosses the southern section of the town.

The St. Regis River, a northward-flowing tributary of the St. Lawrence River, flows out the western town line.

== Demographics ==
Historical population
Census	Pop.	Note	%±
1890	1,690		—
1900	580		−65.7%
1910	675		16.4%
1920	541		−19.9%
1930	528		−2.4%
1940	258		−51.1%
1950	251		−2.7%
1960	158		−37.1%
1970	168		6.3%
1980	310		84.5%
1990	311		0.3%
2000	395		27.0%
2010	345		−12.7%
2016 (est.)	341		−1.2%
U.S. Decennial Census

As of the census of 2000, there were 395 people, 155 households, and 119 families residing in the town. The population density was 2.3 inhabitants per square mile (0.89/km^{2}). There were 953 housing units at an average density of 5.4 per square mile (2.1/km^{2}). The racial makeup of the town was 96.20% White, 0.25% African American, 1.77% Native American, 0.25% Asian, 0.76% from other races, and 0.76% from two or more races.

There were 155 households, out of which 31.6% had children under the age of 18 living with them, 63.2% were married couples living together, 9.0% had a female householder with no husband present, and 22.6% were non-families. 20.0% of all households were made up of individuals, and 8.4% had someone living alone who was 65 years of age or older. The average household size was 2.55 and the average family size was 2.90.

In the town, the population was spread out, with 25.1% under the age of 18, 4.3% from 18 to 24, 23.5% from 25 to 44, 31.1% from 45 to 64, and 15.9% who were 65 years of age or older. The median age was 43 years. For every 100 females, there were 110.1 males. For every 100 females age 18 and over, there were 105.6 males.

The median income for a household in the town was $42,083, and the median income for a family was $45,750. Males had a median income of $30,000 versus $24,688 for females. The per capita income for the town was $19,683. About 8.3% of families and 7.4% of the population were below the poverty line, including 10.5% of those under age 18 and 6.6% of those age 65 or over.

== Communities and locations in Santa Clara ==
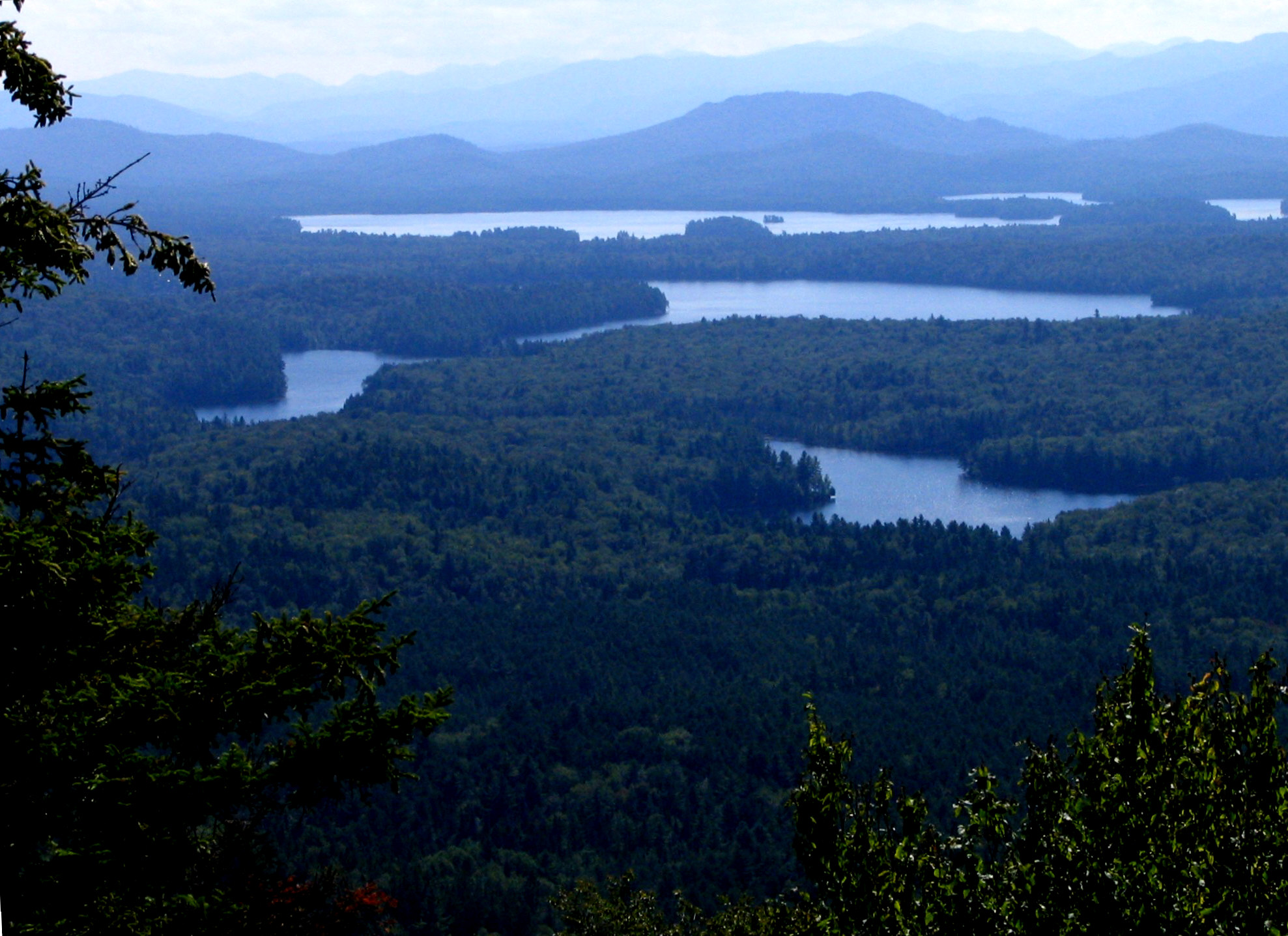
View from Long Pond Mountain of waters of the St. Regis Canoe Area (with the High Peaks in the background)

- Bay Pond – A hamlet in the south-central part of the town. It was a former Rockefeller summer home.
- Brandon – A former community, located north of Bay Pond. It became part of the Rockefeller estate and its buildings were removed.
- Derrick – A hamlet west of Saranac Inn.
- Everton – A former community, abandoned after the forests had been stripped.
- Floodwood – A hamlet west of Saranac Inn near the western town line.
- Kildare – A hamlet west of Saranac Inn near the western town boundary.
- Madawaska – A hamlet near the eastern town line.
- Madawaska Pond – A lake near the center of the town.
- Middle Saranac Lake – Part of the lake is in the southeastern corner of the town.
- Meno – A location northeast of Madawaska.
- The Saint Regis Canoe Area – A 19,000-acre (77 km^{2}) wilderness area with 58 ponds (no motorized vehicles are allowed).
- Santa Clara – the hamlet of Santa Clara is near the western town line in the northern part of the town on NY-458.
- Saranac Inn (also "Upper Saranac") – A hamlet in the southern part of the town.
- Saranac Inn Station – A location east of Saranac Inn.
- Spring Cove – A hamlet near the western town boundary, south of Santa Clara village.
- Upper Saranac Lake – Most of the lake is in the southern part of the town.
- Weller Pond – A large pond in the southern part of the town.
