= Phineas C. Lounsbury =

American politician

Phineas Chapman Lounsbury
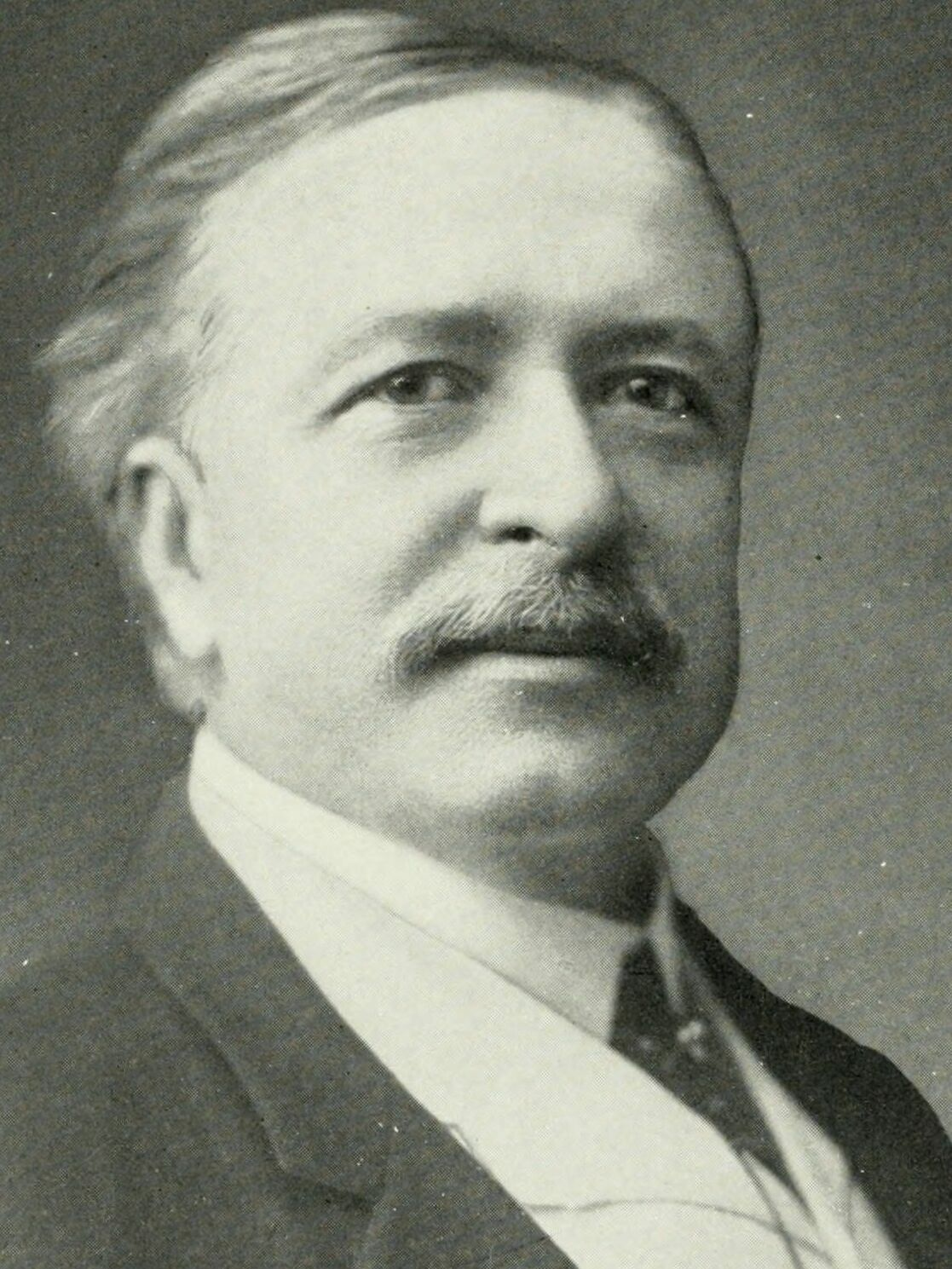

53rd Governor of Connecticut
- In office January 7, 1887 – January 10, 1889
- Lieutenant: James L. Howard
- Preceded by: Henry Baldwin Harrison
- Succeeded by: Morgan Bulkeley

Member of the Connecticut House of Representatives
- In office 1874–1876

Personal details
- Born: January 10, 1841 Ridgefield, Connecticut, U.S.
- Died: June 22, 1925 (aged 84) Ridgefield, Connecticut, U.S.
- Party: Republican
- Spouse: Jennie Wright
- Profession: Farmer, manufacturer, politician

Phineas Chapman Lounsbury (January 10, 1841 – June 22, 1925) was an American politician and the 53rd governor of Connecticut. He was a member of the Republican Party.

His brother, George E. Lounsbury, also served as Governor of Connecticut, serving from 1899 to 1901.

== Biography ==
Lounsbury was born in Ridgefield, Connecticut on January 10, 1841. He worked on his father's farm and attended the local schools. He married Jennie Wright.

== Career ==
In New York City, he secured a position as clerk in a shoe store, and in time familiarized himself with all departments of the business. When the civil war broke out Lounsbury enlisted as a private in the Seventeenth Connecticut Regiment, but after four months' active service was compelled by severe sickness to return, being honorably discharged and recommended for a pension, which he would not accept.

Having laid the foundations for a successful commercial career; he began, upon attaining his majority in 1862, the manufacture of shoes in New Haven under the firm name of Lounsbury Brothers. The business was afterward moved to South Norwalk, and carried on under the firm name of Lounsbury, Matthewson & Co.

Lounsbury became a member of the Connecticut House of Representatives in 1874 and held that position until 1876. Winning the 1886 Republican gubernatorial nomination, Lounsbury was elected governor by a legislative decision. During his term, he signed the Incorrigible Criminal Act. He also advocated for instituting a 60-hour work week for women and children under 16. He did not run for re-election and retired from public service.

After serving as the governor of Connecticut, Lounsbury returned to his business and served as president of the Connecticut Merchants Exchange National Bank. His brother and business partner, George E. Lounsbury, served as governor from 1899 to 1901. In 1883, he built a Great Camp, Echo Camp, on Raquette Lake in the Adirondack.

== Death ==
Lounsbury died in Ridgefield, Connecticut on June 22, 1925. He is interred at Lounsbury Cemetery, Ridgefield, Fairfield County, Connecticut. His home, the Phineas Chapman Lounsbury House, was added to the National Register of Historic Places in 1975.

Party political offices
Preceded by Henry Baldwin Harrison	Republican nominee for Governor of Connecticut; 1886	Succeeded by Morgan Bulkeley
Political offices
Preceded by Henry Baldwin Harrison	Governor of Connecticut; 1887–1889	Succeeded by Morgan Bulkeley
