= Upper Saranac Lake =

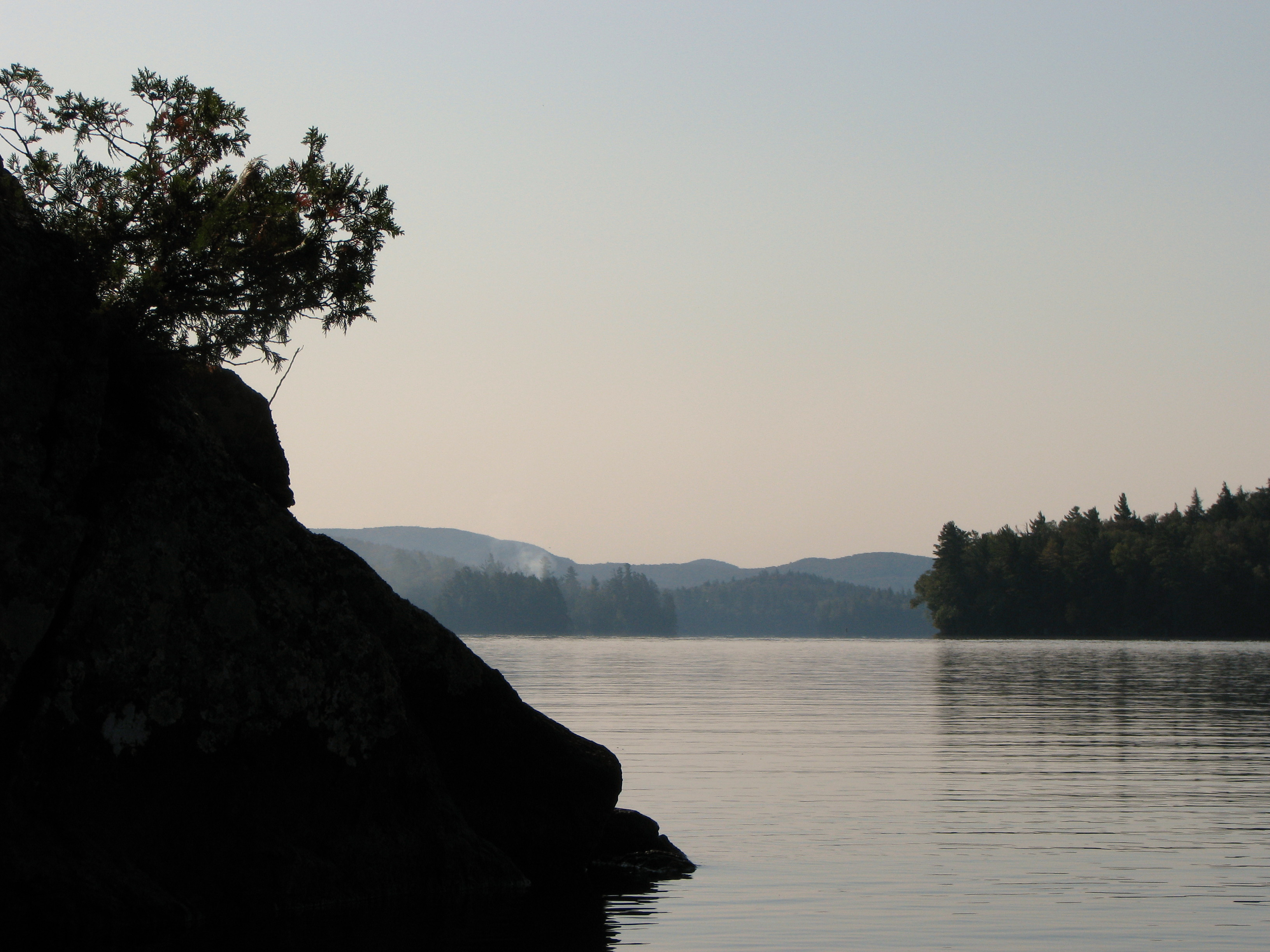
- Looking south near Eagle Island

- Location within New York Upper Saranac Lake (the United States)
- Location: Adirondacks, Franklin County, New York, United States
- Coordinates: 44°17′41″N 74°19′14″W, 44°14′21″N 74°19′18″W
- Type: Lake
- Primary outflows: Saranac River
- Basin countries: United States
- Max. length: 8 mi (13 km)
- Max. width: 2 mi (3.2 km)
- Surface area: 5,250 acres (2,120 ha)
- Shore length^{1}: 37 mi (60 km)
- Surface elevation: 1,572 ft (479 m)
- Islands: 18
- Settlements: Saranac Inn (hamlet)
- ^{1} Shore length is not a well-defined measure.

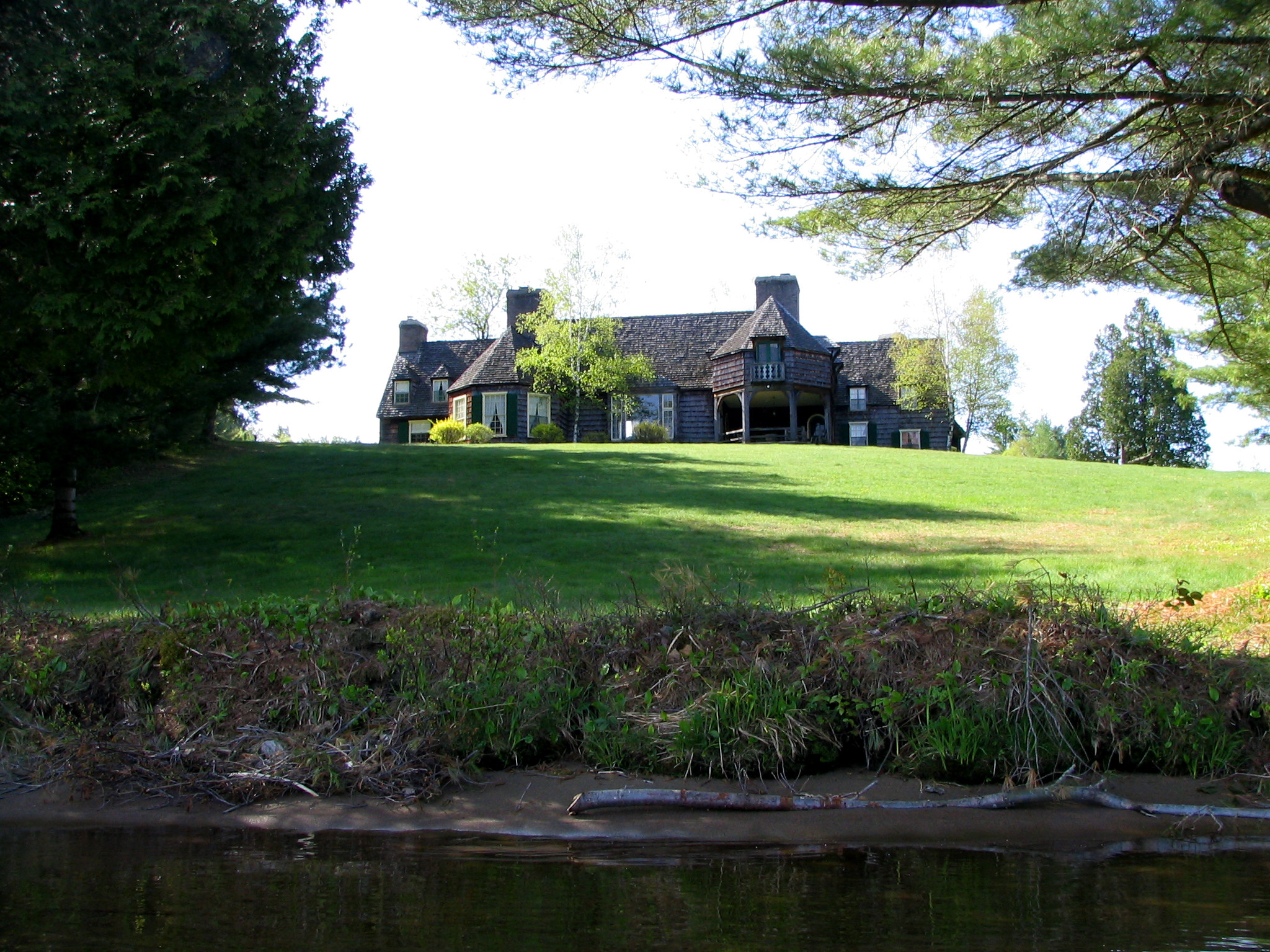
A "camp" on the south shore

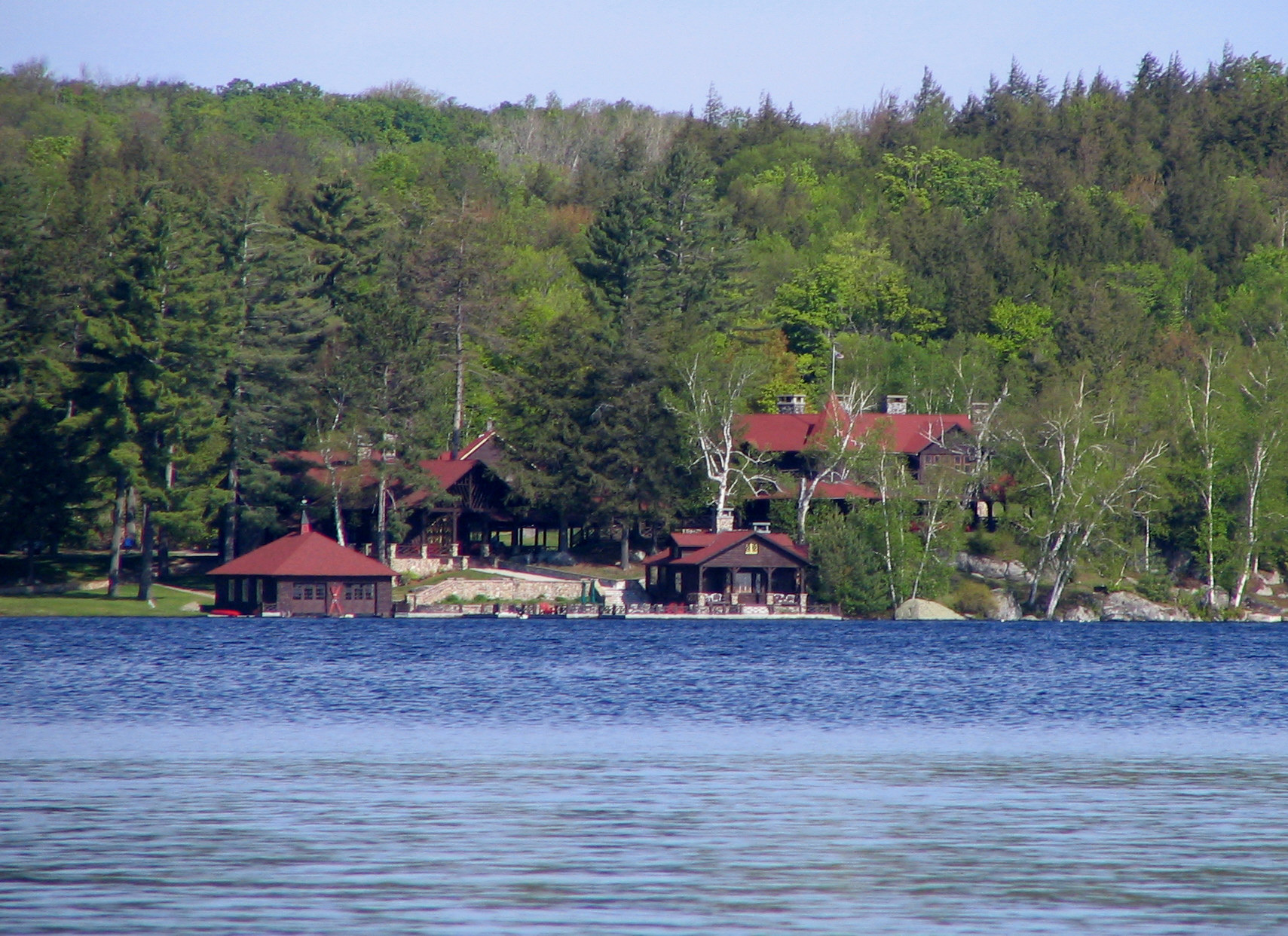
Wenonah Lodge, a great camp on the southwest shore built for Jules Bache about 1915, now privately owned.

Upper Saranac Lake is one of three connected lakes, part of the Saranac River, in the towns of Santa Clara and Harrietstown, near the village of Saranac Lake in the Adirondacks in northern New York. Upper Saranac Lake is the sixth largest lake in the Adirondacks. With Middle Saranac Lake and Lower Saranac Lake, a 17-mile (27 km) paddle with only one carry is possible. There are 20 primitive campsites accessible by boat available on a first-come basis. Upper Saranac Lake is also known as Sin-ha-lo-nen-ne-pus.

The 37 miles of shoreline is 54 percent privately owned, and much of it is lined with "camps", ranging from true Great Camps to small weekend cottages. The lake, along with both Middle and Lower Saranac Lakes, is also part of the 740-mile Northern Forest Canoe Trail, which begins in Old Forge, NY and ends in Fort Kent, ME.

== History ==
Prior to the development of railroads and the automobile, the Saranac Lakes formed part of an important transportation route in the Adirondacks; one could travel 140 miles (230 km) across, from Old Forge to Lake Champlain, almost entirely on water. The earliest settlement on the lake was built at the south end to serve sportsmen: the Rustic Lodge, built by Jessie Corey on Indian Carry, about 1850, was a simple hostelry offering room, board, and guides for hunting and fishing. Bartlett's, built soon after at the site of Bartlett Carry was similar. Bartlett's Carry enabled sportsmen to get from the Upper to the Middle Saranac Lake, while the Indian Carry crossed from Upper Saranac Lake to Stony Creek Ponds and onto the Raquette River.

In 1889, the Wawbeek Lodge (also known as the Hotel Wawbeek) was opened on the southwest shore, 1.5 miles (2.4 km) north of the southern end of the lake, at the historic Sweeney Carry, another portage route to the Raquette. Guests could choose between luxurious hotel rooms, cottages or carpeted platform tents along the shore. Despite its scenic location and lavish appointments, it closed in 1914, a victim of high operating costs and a trend toward shorter hotel stays and increasing private camp and cottage ownership. It was demolished for salvage. In 1922, a much smaller hotel was built on the site which operated until just after the 1980 Winter Olympics. A third hotel complex was established using the buildings of the Great Camp adjacent to the hotel property; it is no longer open to the public, and the buildings, designed by William L. Coulter, have been torn down.

The northern end of the lake was the site of the Saranac Inn, built in 1864, continued in operation until 1962; it burned in 1978. At its peak, it accommodated up to a thousand guests, and was frequented by US Presidents Grover Cleveland and Chester A. Arthur, and New York Governor Charles Evans Hughes.

Camp Eagle Island was a Great Camp built in 1899 as a summer retreat for New York Governor and United States Vice-President Levi Morton, designed by noted architect William L. Coulter. The mainland camp, now known as Pine Brook, was originally a part of the Morton camp. Camp Eagle Island was a Girl Scout camp from 1938 to 2008. Camp Eagle Island was included in a multiple property submission for listing on the National Register of Historic Places in 1986, was listed there in 1987, and was named a National Historic Landmark in 2004. The camp property, including Eagle Island, two smaller islands, and a staging area on Gilpin Bay Road on the mainland, was purchased on November 6, 2015 by The Friends of Eagle Island, Inc. (now Eagle Island, Inc.), which now operates the property as a youth camp.

Moss Ledge and Prospect Point Camp are two other Great Camps on the lake designed by William L. Coulter. In the 1940s, the latter was sold, and had a brief career as a lodge, Sekon in the Pines. It was sold again in 1951, and used as a summer camp for young Jewish girls. In 1969, it was purchased by Young Life, a Christian non-denominational ministry based in Colorado Springs, Colorado, who use it for one-week-long educational camping sessions.

The cottages that grew up around Saranac Inn (the first dozen were built by the Inn owners) still exist, as do some of the Great Camps built in the area. World War I, the Great Depression and the Income Tax combined to put an end to the Great Camp era, however; many were abandoned and lost for unpaid taxes, burned or left to crumble.

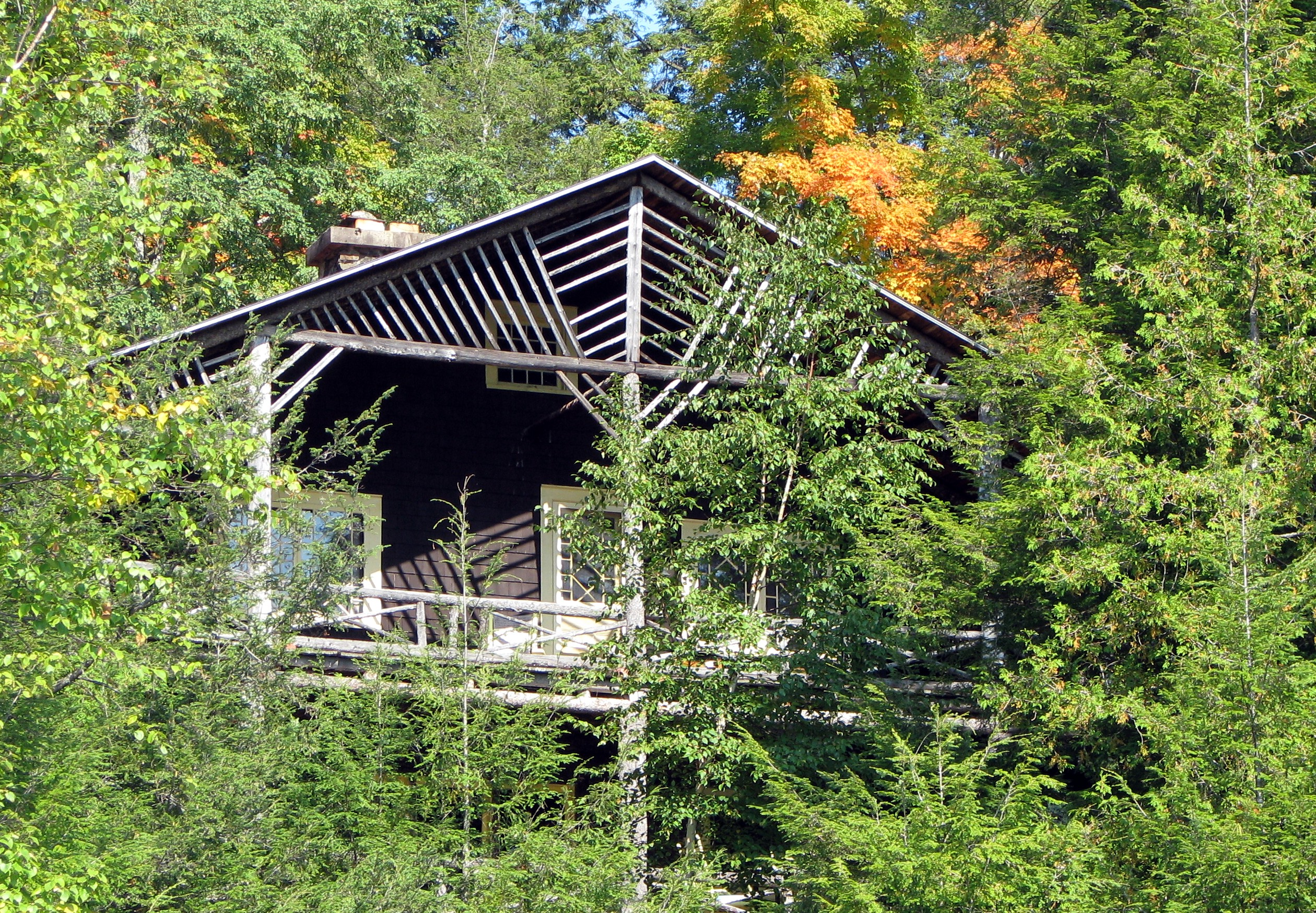
Moss Ledge

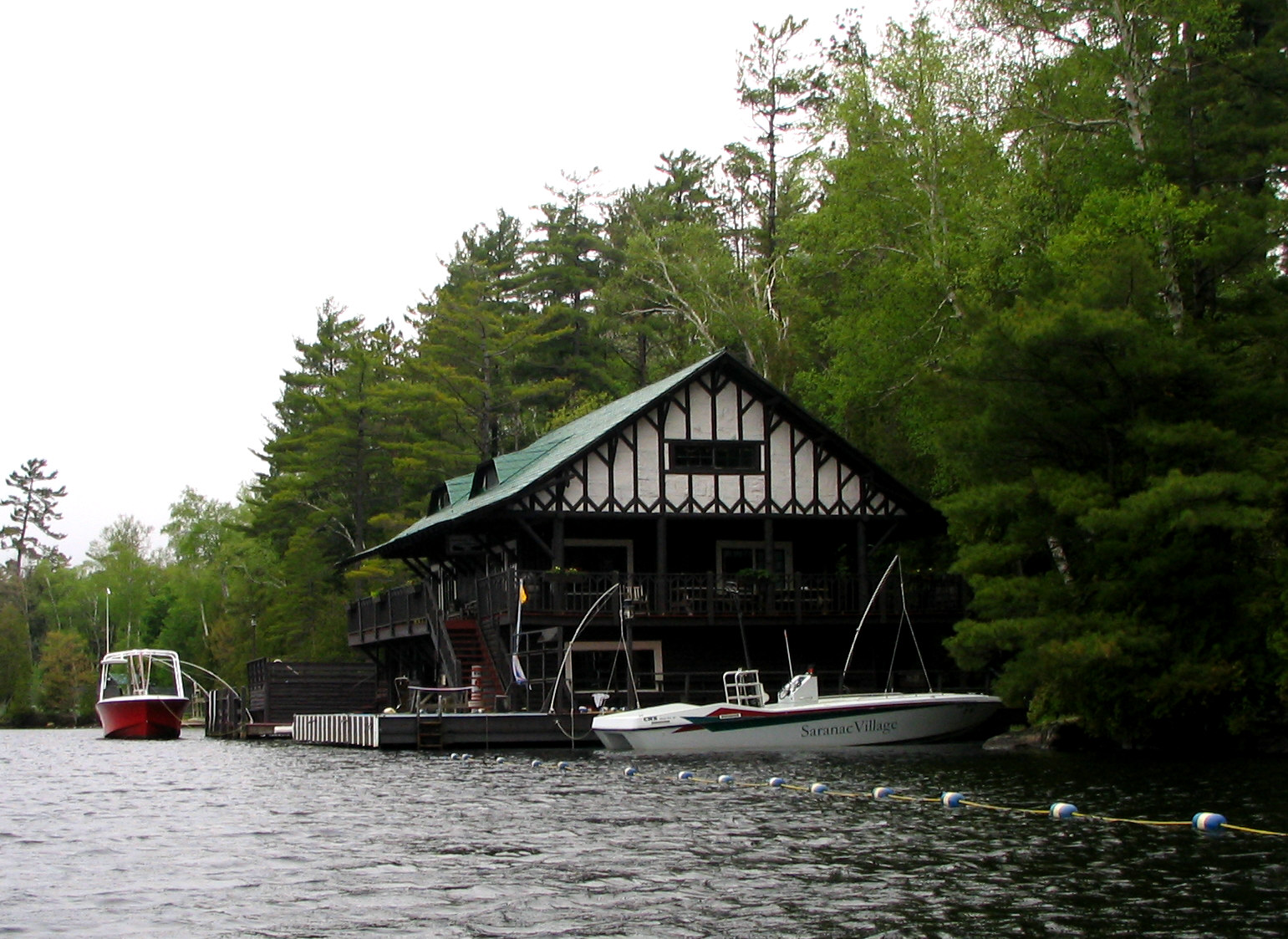
Prospect Point Camp boathouse

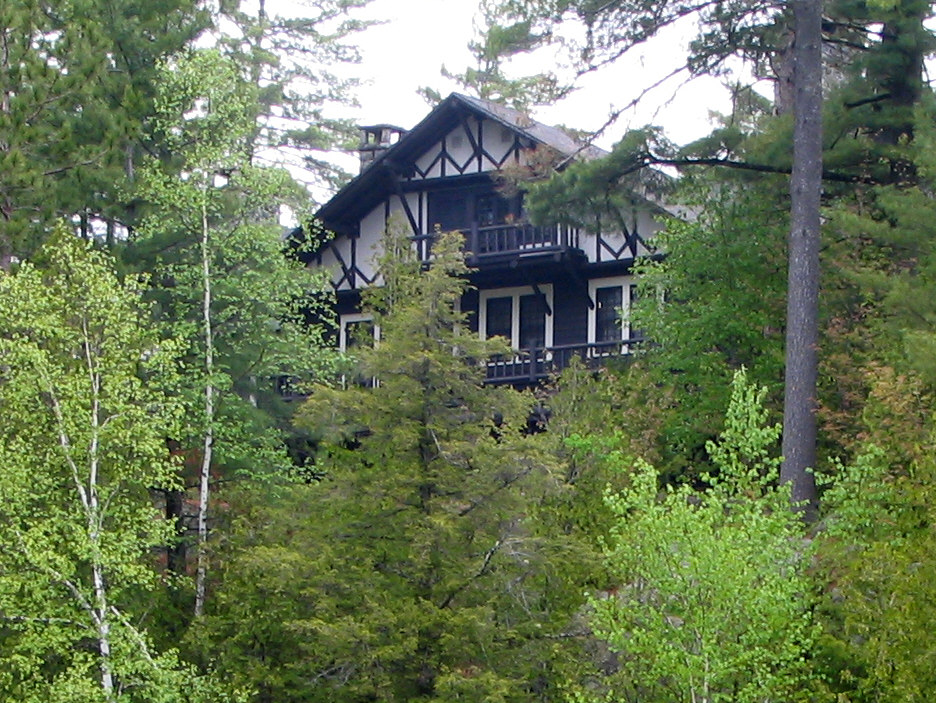
Prospect Point Camp

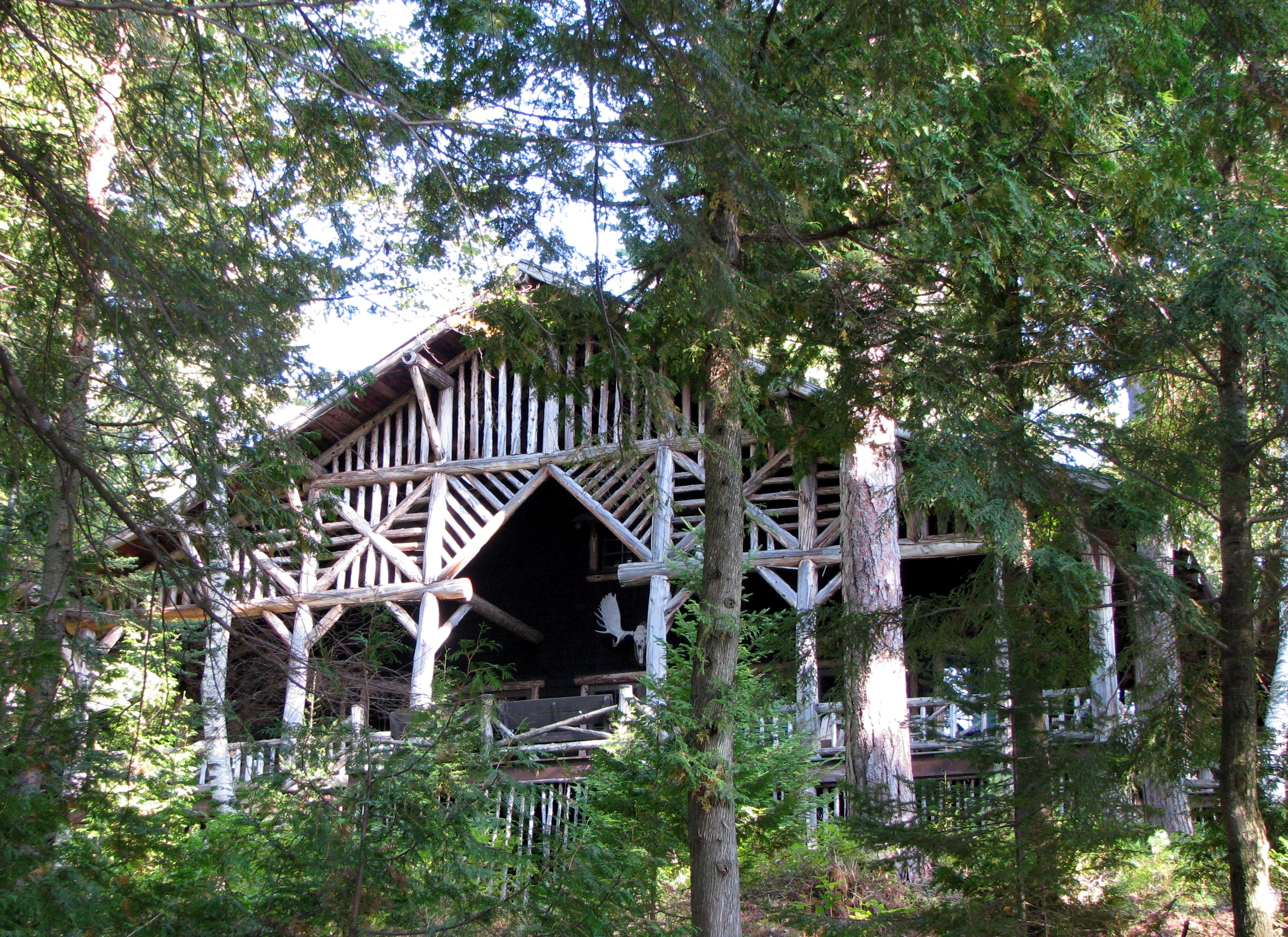
Eagle Island Camp

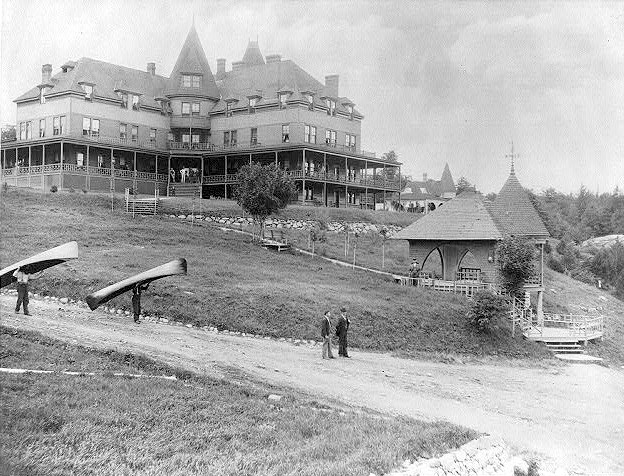
Hotel Wawbeek, 1890 (Stoddard)

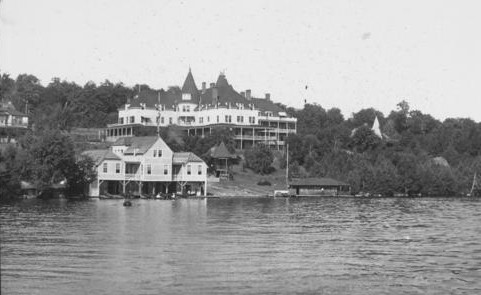
Wawbeek Lodge, 1900

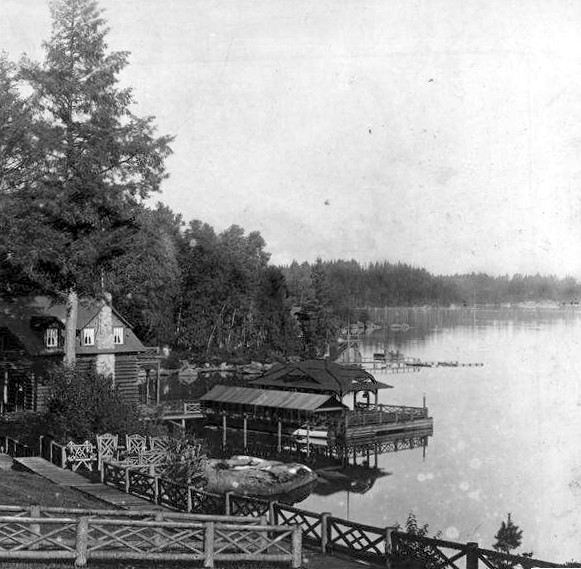
Fish Rock Camp (later Sekon Lodge), 1900

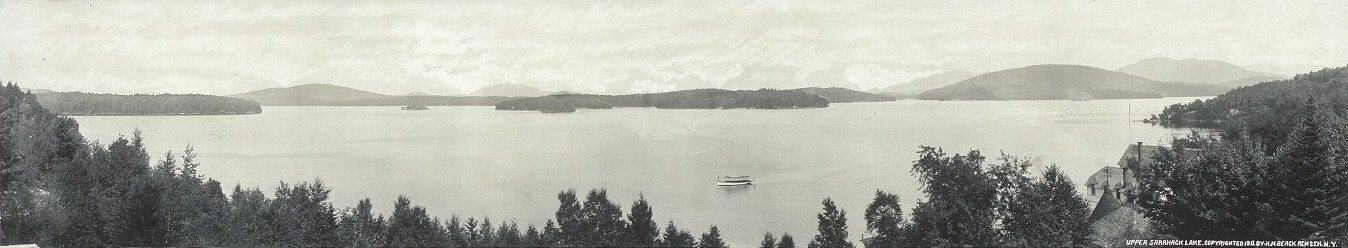
View from the Wawbeek, 1912. The steam launch in the foreground was used to shuttle guests to the hotel from the railway near Saranac Inn.

== See also ==
- Saranac Inn
- Lower Saranac Lake
- Middle Saranac Lake
- Northern Forest Canoe Trail
- Adirondacks

== Sources ==
- Jamieson, Paul and Morris, Donald, Adirondack Canoe Waters, North Flow, Lake George, NY: Adirondack Mountain Club, 1987. ISBN 0-935272-43-7.
- Tolles, Bryant F., Jr., Resort Hotels of the Adirondacks, Lebanon NH: University Press of New England, 2003. ISBN 1-58465-096-6.
