= Theodore Bodenwein =

German-American newspaper publisher and politician

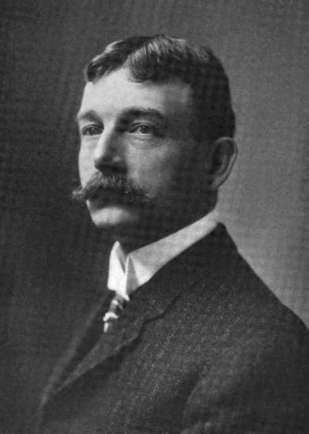
- Born: January 25, 1864; Düsseldorf, Kingdom of Prussia
- Died: January 12, 1939 (aged 74); New London, Connecticut
- Occupation(s): newspaper publisher and politician

Theodore Bodenwein (born Düsseldorf, Kingdom of Prussia, January 25, 1864; died New London, Connecticut, January 12, 1939) was a German-American newspaper publisher and politician. He was the owner and publisher of The Day newspaper in New London, Connecticut from 1891 to 1939 and served two terms as Secretary of the State of Connecticut from 1905 to 1909.

== Early life ==
Bodenwein was born in Düsseldorf to Anton Bodenwein (1839-1912), a shopkeeper and shoemaker, and Agnes Bodenwein (1832-1898); Anton came to America in 1868 and his family followed him the next year. Bodenwein left school at the age of thirteen and in 1881 he became an apprentice in the offices of the newly-founded The Day newspaper in New London, Connecticut. After four years of learning the trade, he became one of the founders of the Morning Telegraph of New London in 1885, which he worked on for five years until selling his share of it. In September 1891 he purchased The Day from Major John Tibbits, who had left for England to be the US consul in Bradford. The Day being a Republican paper, Bodenwein became a Republican himself.

== The Day ==
When Bodenwein purchased the paper (for almost $26,000, considered a very large price) it had a circulation of 1,500 and heavy debts; by 1906 the circulation had quadrupled to 6,000. In 1901 Bodenwein purchased the Morning Telegraph and ran both newspapers out of the same office, then an unusual arrangement.

Bodenwein's will, written in 1938, transferred the ownership of the paper to a trust. The Day Trust operates the newspaper and devotes a portion of its profits to charity through the Bodenwein Public Benevolent Foundation. The trust arrangement survived a lawsuit by Bodenwein's son Gordon after Bodenwein's death and an adverse ruling by the IRS after the death of the last surviving heir in 1978 that could have forced the divestment of the newspaper's stock.

== Politics ==
Bodenwein served as an alderman and as sewer commissioner in New London 1903-1906. He was elected secretary of the state of Connecticut in 1904 and 1906, serving 1905-1909. He served as an alternate delegate to the Republican National Convention in 1908 and 1932, and as a member of the Connecticut Republican State Central Committee in 1930.

== Family and death ==
Bodenwein married Jennie Muir February 21, 1889. Their children were Theodore R. Bodenwein (1889-1890), Gordon (1893-1967) and Elizabeth (1896). He was later married to Edna G. Simpson. He died in Lawrence and Memorial Associated Hospitals in New London of a heart ailment.
