= Eagle Island Camp =

- U.S. National Register of Historic Places
- U.S. National Historic Landmark
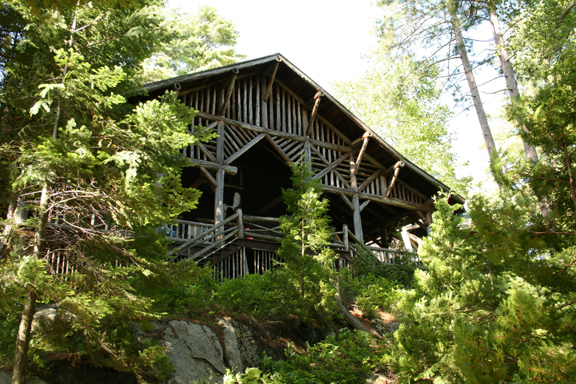

- Location within New York Adirondack Park
- Location: Franklin County
- Nearest city: Saranac Lake, New York
- Coordinates: 44°16′27.84″N 74°19′57″W
- Built: 1903
- Architect: William L. Coulter
- Architectural style: Adirondack Rustic
- MPS: Great Camps of the Adirondacks TR
- NRHP reference No.: 86002941

Significant dates
- Added to NRHP: April 3, 1987
- Designated NHL: August 18, 2004

Eagle Island Camp, also known as Camp Eagle Island or simply EIC, is a youth summer camp and former Girl Scout camp in Franklin County, New York, located on Eagle Island on Upper Saranac Lake in New York's Adirondack region. The site is listed on the National Register of Historic Places.

== Adirondack Great Camp years ==
The camp occupies buildings originally built in 1903 as a summer retreat for New York Governor and United States Vice President Levi Morton and designed by architect William L. Coulter. The mainland camp now known as Pine Brook was originally a part of the Morton Great Camp. Camp Eagle Island was included in a multiple property submission for listing on the National Register of Historic Places in 1986, was listed there in 1987, and was named a National Historic Landmark in 2004.

== Girl Scout years ==
Eagle Island Camp became a Girl Scout property in 1938, when the Graves family of Orange, New Jersey, gave the island to the Maplewood-South Orange Girl Scout Council. After a series of council mergers, the last council to own the property and operate the camp was Girl Scouts Heart of New Jersey. The Council operated it as overnight camp through the summer of 2008 and voted to sell it on October 11, 2010.

== Later years ==
The camp property, including Eagle Island, two smaller islands, and a staging area on Gilpin Bay Road on the mainland, was purchased on November 6, 2015 by The Friends of Eagle Island, Inc. (now Eagle Island, Inc.), which operates the property as a youth camp.
