= Saranac Inn =

Hotel in northern New York state, US

Coordinates: 44°20′46″N 74°19′5″W

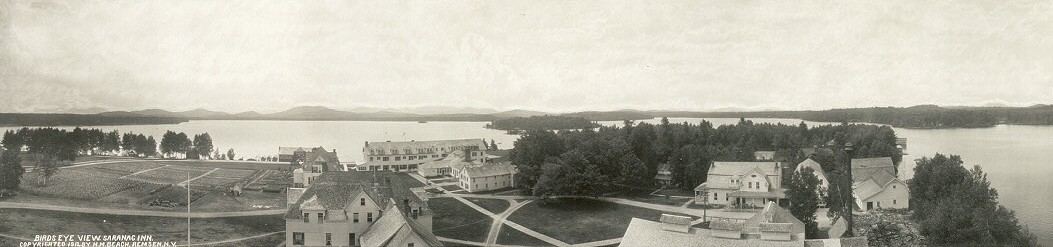
Saranac Inn, 1912

The Saranac Inn was a large, luxury hotel located on a peninsula at the northern end of the Upper Saranac Lake in the town of Santa Clara in the Adirondacks in New York State. It was frequented by US Presidents Grover Cleveland and Chester A. Arthur and New York Governor Charles Evans Hughes. It closed in 1962, and destroyed by fire in 1978.

== History ==
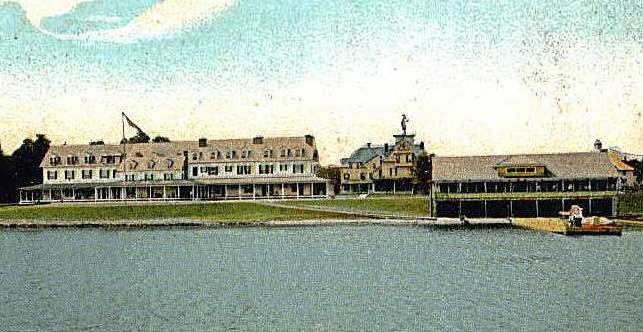
Lakeside, from a 1907 postcard

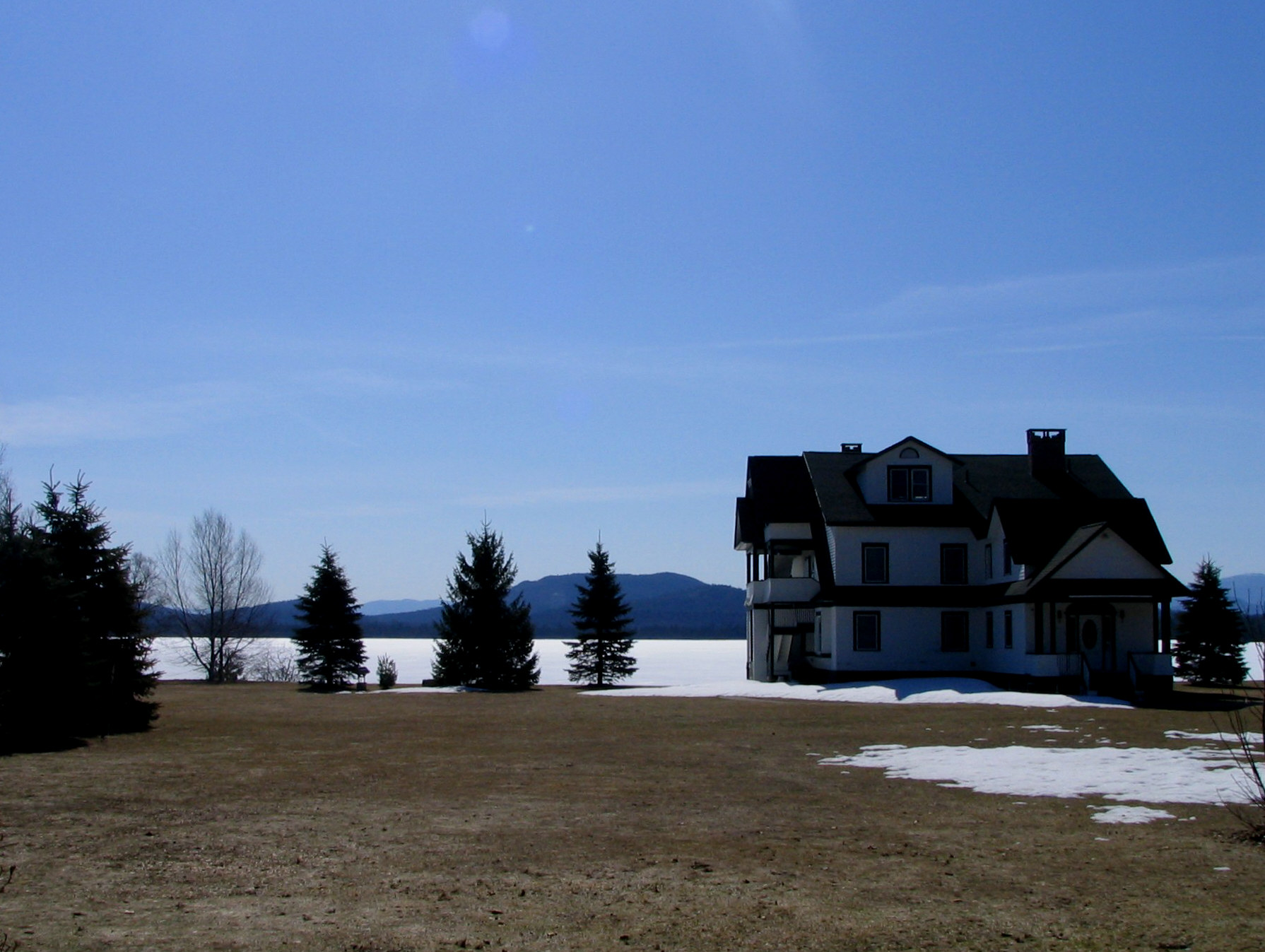
Residence built on the former grounds of the Inn

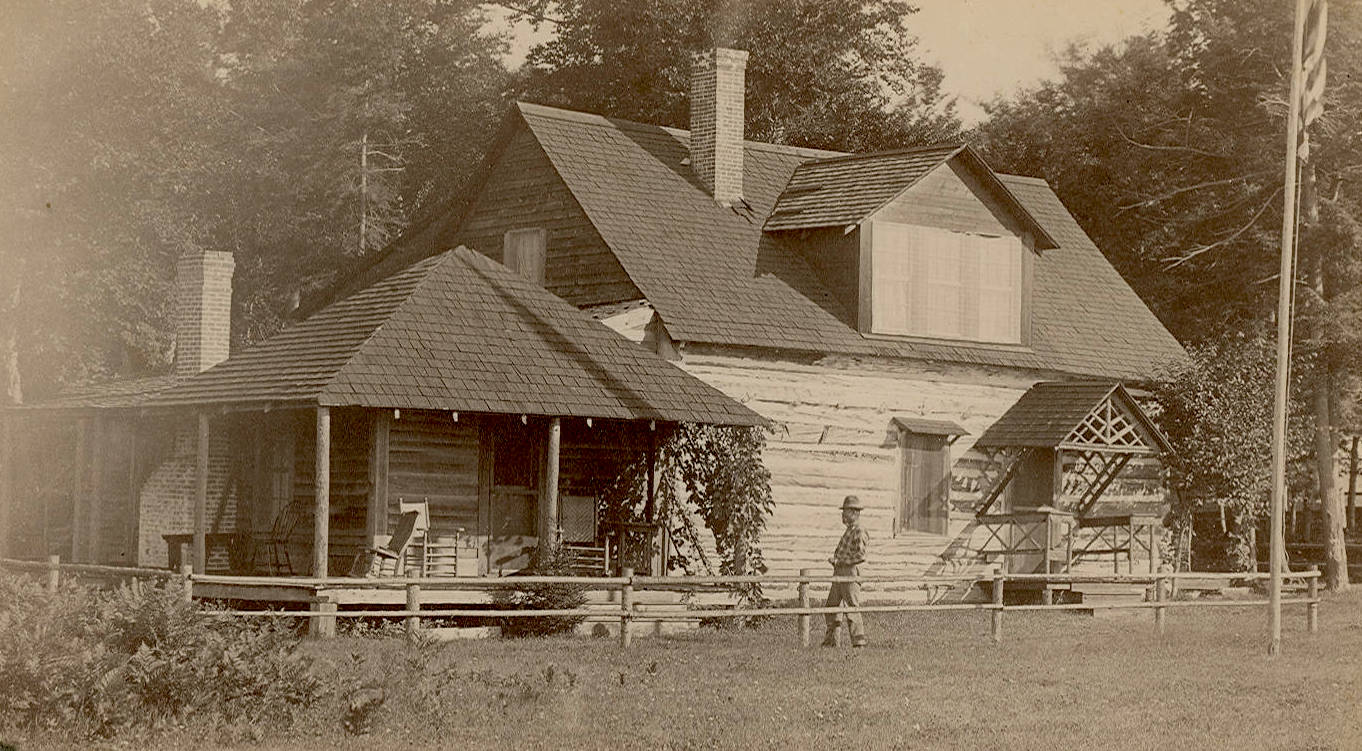
The Cottage owned by US President Grover Cleveland that preceded the Inn (S R Stoddard)

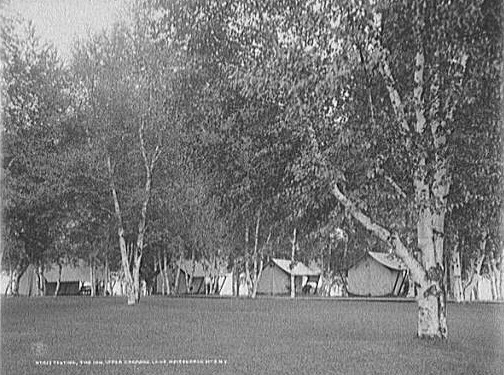
Tenting at Saranac Inn, 1909

Originally the Prospect House in 1864, it initially accommodated 15 guests. It was gradually enlarged to host 100. In 1886 it was purchased by investors who renamed it Saranac Inn, and began a program of renovation and construction that increased the capacity to 250 by 1909. The opening of the Mohawk and Malone Railway in 1892, dramatically reducing travel time from major east coast cities to the Adirondacks, had a major positive impact.

Religious services in the Episcopal tradition were held at the Prospect House during the summer tourist season beginning in 1882; the Church of the Ascension was built to hold these services starting in 1884.

In 1912 the hotel was purchased by Harrington Mills, the owner of the Harrington Hotel in Washington, DC, who completely rebuilt the structure, adding two stories, elevators, and a bath in each room. It underwent further enlargement in the 1920s. Noted Saranac Lake architect William G. Distin was responsible for much of the design. At its height, between the enlarged main hotel and many lakeside cottages and platform tents, it could accommodate 1,000 guests.

After the Great Depression, the hotel's business dropped sharply, and it changed hands several times. In 1946, it was purchased by a national hotel chain, who hosted large conventions, briefly improving finances. It changed hands again in 1957, but closed in 1962 as unprofitable. Finally, it was bought for $400,000 by auctioneers, who sold the property piecemeal: the golf course, the cottages, and the hotel all going to different owners. In the mid-1970s, the hotel was partially dismantled for salvage materials. Finally, on June 17, 1978, a seven-hour fire destroyed the rest.

The small collection of cottages that grew up around the Inn (the first dozen were built by the Inn owners) still exists, (the Brown cottages) as do some of the Great Camps built in the area. World War I, the Great Depression and the Income Tax combined to put an end to the Great Camp era, however; and like the Inn, many of the Great Camps were abandoned and/or lost for unpaid taxes, burned or left to crumble.

== Sources ==
- Tolles, Bryant F. Jr, Resort Hotels of the Adirondacks, University Press of New England, 2003. ISBN 1-58465-096-6.
