= National Register of Historic Places listings in Franklin County, New York =

Location of Franklin County in New York

List of the National Register of Historic Places listings in Franklin County, New York

This is intended to be a complete list of properties and districts listed on the National Register of Historic Places in Franklin County, New York. The locations of National Register properties and districts may be seen in a map by clicking on "Map of all coordinates". Two areas that are further designated National Historic Landmarks are the county's portion of the Adirondack Forest Preserve and the Eagle Island Camp.

There are a total of 87 entries. Three of these Registered Historic Places are in fact historic districts which include a total of eighty buildings and other structures. To be listed on the National Register, sites must retain their historic integrity, they usually must be at least fifty years old, and their listing must be promoted – or at least not be opposed – by the current owner, so many historically important sites in the county are not listed.

This National Park Service list is complete through NPS recent listings posted July 4, 2026.

Contents: Counties in New York
Albany (Albany) – Allegany – Bronx – Broome – Cattaraugus – Cayuga – Chautauqua – Chemung – Chenango – Clinton – Columbia – Cortland – Delaware – Dutchess (Poughkeepsie, Rhinebeck) – Erie (Buffalo) – Essex – Franklin – Fulton – Genesee – Greene – Hamilton – Herkimer – Jefferson – Kings – Lewis – Livingston – Madison – Monroe (Rochester) – Montgomery – Nassau – New York (Below 14th Street, 14th to 59th Streets, 59th to 110th Streets, Above 110th Street, Islands) – Niagara (Niagara Falls) – Oneida – Onondaga (Syracuse) – Ontario – Orange – Orleans – Oswego – Otsego – Putnam – Queens – Rensselaer – Richmond – Rockland – St. Lawrence – Saratoga – Schenectady – Schoharie – Schuyler – Seneca – Steuben – Suffolk – Sullivan – Tioga – Tompkins – Ulster – Warren – Washington – Wayne – Westchester (Northern, Southern, New Rochelle, Peekskill, Yonkers) – Wyoming – Yates

== Listings county-wide ==
	Name on the Register	Image	Date listed	Location	City or town	Description
1	Adirondack Forest Preserve	Adirondack Forest Preserve	October 15, 1966 (#66000891)	NE New York State; 43°58′43″N 74°18′42″W	Adirondack Park	The Adirondack Forest Preserve is a National Historic Landmark. Approximately 736,654 acres (2,981.13 km^{2}) of the six million acre (24,000 km²) park are located in Franklin county.
2	Dr. A. H. Allen Cottage	Dr. A. H. Allen Cottage	November 6, 1992 (#92001454)	22 Catherine St. 44°19′53″N 74°07′47″W	Saranac Lake	A 1909 Scopes and Feustmann-designed "cure cottage".
3	Ames Cottage	Ames Cottage	November 6, 1992 (#92001458)	43 Church St. 44°19′29″N 74°07′40″W	Saranac Lake (Harrietstown)	A Queen Anne style "cure cottage" built about 1906.
4	Azure Mountain Fire Observation Station	Azure Mountain Fire Observation Station	September 23, 2001 (#01001036)	Azure Mountain; 44°32′28″N 74°30′02″W	Waverly	A 1918, 35-foot (11 m) Aermotor galvanized steel fire tower on 2,518-foot (767 m) Azure Mountain.
5	Baird Cottage	Baird Cottage	November 6, 1992 (#92001466)	Glenwood Rd. 44°18′53″N 74°08′05″W	Saranac Lake (Harrietstown)	A virtually intact "cure cottage" built in 1930, near the end of the cure cottage era.
6	Barngalow	Barngalow	November 6, 1992 (#92001427)	108½ Park Ave. 44°20′02″N 74°07′44″W	Saranac Lake (North Elba)	A two-story "cure cottage" that was originally a barn, converted to residential use in 1910.
7	Berkeley Square Historic District	Berkeley Square Historic District	February 11, 1988 (#88000114)	30-84 Main St., 2-29 Broadway; also blocks roughly bounded by Broadway, Main, Olive, and Woodruff Sts; 44°19′35″N 74°07′53″W	Saranac Lake	Harrietstown Hall and 26 commercial buildings constructed between 1867 and 1932. A boundary increase was approved August 9, 2024.
8	Brighton Town Hall	Brighton Town Hall	November 7, 2003 (#03001121)	12 Cty Rd. 31; 44°26′27″N 74°13′57″W	Brighton	Designed and built by Benjamin A. Muncil in 1914.
9	Camp Intermission	Camp Intermission	November 6, 1992 (#92001421)	Northwest Bay Rd. 44°20′55″N 74°08′56″W	Saranac Lake (Harrietstown)	A Great Camp built for theatrical agent William Morris, designed by William G. Distin
10	Camp Topridge	Camp Topridge	November 7, 1986 (#86002952)	S of Keese Mills Rd., Upper St. Regis Lake; 44°25′15″N 74°18′07″W	Keese Mill	An Adirondack Great Camp built in 1923 by Marjorie Merriweather Post, founder of General Foods and the daughter of C. W. Post.
11	Camp Wild Air	Camp Wild Air	November 7, 1986 (#86002930)	Upper St. Regis Lake; 44°24′31″N 74°16′30″W	Upper St. Regis	An early Adirondack Great Camp built by New York Herald Tribune publisher Whitelaw Reid.
12	Church of the Ascension Chapel and Rectory	Church of the Ascension Chapel and Rectory	November 8, 2021 (#100007097)	32 and 81 Cty. Rd. 46; 44°20′41″N 74°19′29″W	Saranac Inn	
13	Church Street Historic District	Church Street Historic District	November 6, 1992 (#92001472)	Roughly, Church St. from Main St. to St. Bernard St. 44°19′35″N 74°07′47″W	Saranac Lake (Harrietstown)	Twenty-seven buildings including three churches, a medical laboratory, ten homes, two libraries, six cure cottages, most built between the late 1870s and 1900.
14	Colbath Cottage	Colbath Cottage	November 6, 1992 (#92001433)	30 River St. 44°19′32″N 74°07′46″W	Saranac Lake (Harrietstown)	A Queen Anne-style "cure cottage" built about 1896.
15	Corey Cottage	Corey Cottage	November 14, 2022 (#100008337)	19 Helen St. 44°19′36″N 74°07′40″W	Saranac Lake (Harrietstown)	
16	Cottage Row Historic District	Cottage Row Historic District	November 6, 1992 (#92001473)	Roughly, Park Ave. N side from Rosemont Ave. to Catherine St. 44°19′59″N 74°08′00″W	Saranac Lake (Harrietstown)	Twenty-seven "cure cottage" built between 1900 and 1940.
17	Debar Pond Lodge	Debar Pond Lodge	December 16, 2014 (#14001048)	Debar Park Rd. 44°38′03″N 74°12′10″W	Duane	Saranac Lake architect William Distin's private lodge for family and friends, built in 1939 and well-preserved
18	Distin Cottage	Distin Cottage	November 6, 1992 (#92001416)	11 Kiwassa Rd. 44°19′10″N 74°07′48″W	Saranac Lake (Harrietstown)	A "cure cottage" designed by architect William G. Distin for his father, photographer William L. Distin, built between 1915 and 1925.
19	Drury Cottage	Drury Cottage	November 6, 1992 (#92001450)	29 Bloomingdale Ave. 44°19′46″N 74°07′52″W	Saranac Lake (Harrietstown)	A "cure cottage" built c. 1912.
20	Duane Methodist Episcopal Church	Duane Methodist Episcopal Church	August 9, 1991 (#91001027)	NY 26 E of jct. with Kenny Rd. 44°39′34″N 74°15′46″W	Duane	Romanesque Revival design built between 1883 and 1885, church was in use for more than 100 years.
21	Eagle Island Camp	Eagle Island Camp	April 3, 1987 (#86002941)	Eagle Island, Upper Saranac Lake; 44°16′34″N 74°20′03″W	Saranac Inn	Built in 1899 as a summer retreat for New York Governor and United States Vice-President Levi Morton and designed by noted architect William L. Coulter.
22	Ellenberger Cottage	Ellenberger Cottage	November 6, 1992 (#92001453)	183 Broadway; 44°19′55″N 74°08′16″W	Saranac Lake (Harrietstown)	A Queen Anne style "cure cottage" built before 1917.
23	Feisthamel-Edelberg Cottage	Feisthamel-Edelberg Cottage	November 6, 1992 (#92001420)	11 Neil St. 44°19′44″N 74°08′11″W	Saranac Lake (Harrietstown)	An intact "cure cottage" built before 1915.
24	Feustmann Cottage	Feustmann Cottage	November 6, 1992 (#92001455)	28 Catherine St. 44°19′58″N 74°07′50″W	Saranac Lake (Harrietstown)	A private "cure cottage" designed by architect Maurice Feustmann for use by his own family.
25	First Congregational Church	First Congregational Church	June 6, 1991 (#91000627)	2 Clay St. 44°50′57″N 74°17′19″W	Malone	An 1883 Romanesque stone church featuring a 105-foot (32 m) fortress-like tower with bell-ringer's room and eleven-bell carillon.
26	First Union Protestant Church of Mountain View	First Union Protestant Church of Mountain View	March 15, 2005 (#05000162)	7 Church Rd. 44°42′06″N 74°08′22″W	Bellmont	A wood-framed church built in 1916.
27	Freer Cottage	Freer Cottage	November 6, 1992 (#92001417)	40 Kiwassa St. 44°19′03″N 74°07′54″W	Saranac Lake	A largely intact private "cure cottage" built before 1925
28	E. L. Gray House	E. L. Gray House	November 6, 1992 (#92001469)	15 Helen St. 44°19′34″N 74°07′41″W	Saranac Lake (Harrietstown)	A "cure cottage" designed by Scopes and Feustmann, built between 1911 and 1913.
29	Hastings Farmstead	Hastings Farmstead	August 30, 2007 (#07000872)	12 Conservation Rd. 44°43′41″N 74°29′12″W	Dickinson Center	A 162-acre (0.66 km^{2}) farm with an 1896 Victorian farmhouse and seven outbuildings built between 1820 and 1940.
30	Hathaway Cottage	Hathaway Cottage	November 6, 1992 (#92001457)	6 Charles St. 44°19′50″N 74°08′18″W	Saranac Lake	A largely intact American Craftsman "cure cottage" built about 1900.
31	Helen Hill Historic District	Helen Hill Historic District	October 23, 2015 (#15000754)	Prescott Place, Helen & Front Sts., Sheppard, Franklin & Clinton Aves. 44°19′30″N 74°07′40″W	Saranac Lake	Residential neighborhood from early 20th century, with many cottages retaining the "cure porches" that distinguished the area's early days as a sanitarium.
32	Hillside Lodge	Hillside Lodge	November 6, 1992 (#92001467)	Harrietstown Rd. 44°21′18″N 74°08′47″W	Saranac Lake (Harrietstown)	An intact "cure cottage" built about 1920.
33	The Homestead	The Homestead	November 6, 1992 (#92001418)	3 Maple Hill; 44°19′24″N 74°07′55″W	Saranac Lake	A boarding "cure cottage" built in 1890.
34	Hooey Cottage	Hooey Cottage	November 6, 1992 (#92001429)	24 Park Pl. 44°19′41″N 74°07′38″W	Saranac Lake (Harrietstown)	A 1916 "cure cottage".
35	Hopkins Cottage	Hopkins Cottage	November 6, 1992 (#92001448)	5 Birch St. 44°19′04″N 74°07′48″W	Saranac Lake (Harrietstown)	A "cure cottage" built in 1923.
36	Horton Gristmill	Horton Gristmill	April 21, 1975 (#75001188)	Mill St. 44°50′52″N 74°17′35″W	Malone	A stone gristmill built in 1853.
37	Hotel Saranac	Hotel Saranac	April 5, 2019 (#100003627)	100 Main St. 44°19′37″N 74°07′49″W	Saranac Lake	1927 multistory brick Colonial Revival hotel, asserted to be first fireproof hotel in the Adirondacks.
38	Jennings Cottage	Jennings Cottage	November 6, 1992 (#92001419)	16 Marshall St. 44°19′51″N 74°07′50″W	Saranac Lake (Harrietstown)	An 1896 Bungalow-style "cure cottage".
39	Johnson Cottage	Johnson Cottage	November 6, 1992 (#92001436)	6½ St. Bernard St. 44°19′32″N 74°07′55″W	Saranac Lake (Harrietstown)	A largely intact "cure cottage" built before 1896.
40	Beth Joseph Synagogue	Beth Joseph Synagogue	September 1, 1988 (#88001441)	Lake and Mill Sts. 44°13′29″N 74°27′55″W	Tupper Lake	Built in 1905, it is the oldest synagogue in the Adirondacks.
41	Lady Tree Lodge	Lady Tree Lodge	March 12, 2018 (#100002188)	21 Loon Over Lane; 44°20′46″N 74°18′56″W	Saranac	1896 rustic cottage built as part of Saranac Inn, later used as summer residence by Texas newspaper publisher A. H. Belo and New York governor Charles Evans Hughes
42	Larom Cottage	Larom Cottage	November 6, 1992 (#92001428)	112 Park Ave. 44°20′02″N 74°07′42″W	Saranac Lake	A "cure cottage" built between 1905 and 1910.
43	Larom-Welles Cottage	Larom-Welles Cottage	November 6, 1992 (#92001478)	110 Park Ave. 44°20′02″N 74°07′45″W	Saranac Lake (North Elba)	A 1905, three-story, wood-frame "cure cottage", built for the priest of St. Luke's Episcopal Church, later the home of Dr. Edward Welles, a pioneer in thoracic surgery, who practiced at the Adirondack Cottage Sanatorium.
44	Leis Block	Leis Block	November 6, 1992 (#92001449)	3-5 Bloomingdale Ave. 44°19′44″N 74°07′59″W	Saranac Lake (Harrietstown)	A 1902 commercial building with apartments built with "cure porches", it originally housed Henry P. Leis pianos and a pharmacy on its first floor.
45	Leis Cottage	Leis Cottage	November 6, 1992 (#92001444)	26 Algonquin Ave. 44°19′14″N 74°08′59″W	Saranac Lake (Harrietstown)	A private, shingled cure cottage" built about 1906.
46	Anselm Lincoln House	Anselm Lincoln House	April 21, 1975 (#75001189)	49 Duane St. 44°50′50″N 74°17′40″W	Malone	An 1830 stone house, believed to be the oldest extant house in Franklin County.
47	Little Red	Little Red	November 6, 1992 (#92001446)	Algonquin Ave. 44°19′06″N 74°09′29″W	Saranac Lake	The original "cure cottage" of the Adirondack Cottage Sanitorium founded by Dr. Edward Livingston Trudeau.
48	Loon Lake Mountain Fire Observation Station	Loon Lake Mountain Fire Observation Station	December 5, 2008 (#08001144)	Summit of Loon Lake Mountain; 44°33′29″N 74°09′06″W	Franklin	The Loon Lake Mountain Fire Observation Station is a historic fire observation station located on Loon Lake Mountain at Loon Lake in Franklin County, New York. The station includes a 35-foot-tall (10.7 m), steel-frame lookout tower erected in 1917 that has been abandoned since 1971. The tower was built by the Aermotor Corporation.
49	Magill Cottage	Magill Cottage	November 6, 1992 (#92001430)	37 Riverside Dr. 44°19′12″N 74°07′39″W	Saranac Lake (Harrietstown)	A cure cottage built about 1911.
50	Malone Armory	Malone Armory	March 2, 1995 (#95000089)	116 W. Main St. 44°50′54″N 74°17′54″W	Malone	A large, castellated, stone and brick armory built in 1892, designed by state architect Isaac G. Perry.
51	Malone Downtown Historic District	Malone Downtown Historic District	March 3, 2021 (#100006217)	Roughly bounded by Brewster, Main, Church, and Elm Sts., and Wheeler Ave. 44°50′56″N 74°17′38″W	Malone	
52	Malone Freight Depot	Malone Freight Depot	December 12, 1976 (#76001217)	99 Railroad St. 44°51′01″N 74°17′50″W	Malone	Built in 1852, in association with the development of the Northern Railroad.
53	Malone Residential Historic District	Malone Residential Historic District	March 17, 2025 (#100011536)	Bounded by the Salmon River on the west and south, 4th Street at the northern end, and Prospect and Morton streets at the east 44°51′17″N 74°17′21″W	Malone	
54	McBean Cottage	McBean Cottage	November 6, 1992 (#92001425)	89 Park Ave. 44°19′57″N 74°07′51″W	Saranac Lake (Harrietstown)	A Colonial Revival "cure cottage" with Craftsman-style touches, built between 1915 and 1925.
55	Merrillsville Cure Cottage	Merrillsville Cure Cottage	August 10, 1995 (#95000947)	Jct. of Co. Rt. 99 and Old NY 3; 44°31′18″N 74°00′52″W	Merrillsville	Built about 1900 as part of a tuberculosis curing facility; it is now used as a town hall.
56	The Moorings		August 26, 2025 (#100012186)	365 Big Wolf Road East; 44°16′57″N 74°28′01″W	Tupper Lake	
57	Morgan Cottage	Morgan Cottage	November 6, 1992 (#92001426)	100 Park Ave. 44°19′58″N 74°07′48″W	Saranac Lake (Harrietstown)	A 1915 bungalow designed by Scopes and Feustmann as a "cure cottage".
58	Moss Ledge	Moss Ledge	November 7, 1986 (#86002942)	Off NY 30, Upper Saranac Lake; 44°17′01″N 74°20′03″W	Saranac Inn	An Adirondack Great Camp designed by William L. Coulter in 1898 for Isabel Ballantine of New York City.
59	Musselman Cottage	Musselman Cottage	November 6, 1992 (#92001431)	25 Riverside Dr. 44°19′20″N 74°07′46″W	Saranac Lake	A boardinghouse-style "cure cottage" built about 1907.
60	New York Central Railroad Adirondack Division Historic District	New York Central Railroad Adirondack Division Historic District	December 23, 1993 (#93001451)	NYCRR Right-of-Way from Remsen to Lake Placid; 44°19′51″N 74°07′57″W	Saranac Lake	The New York Central Adirondack Line ran from Remsen to Lake Placid. There are extant stations in Lake Clear Junction and Saranac Lake; the Adirondack Scenic Railroad runs a tourist train between Lake Placid and Saranac Lake.
61	Northbrook Lodge	Northbrook Lodge	April 7, 2014 (#14000127)	58 Northbrook Rd. 44°26′47″N 74°13′35″W	Paul Smiths	Northbrook Lodge on Osgood Pond is a historic camp located within the Adirondack Park in Franklin County, New York. The camp complex was built by noted great camp builder Benjamin A. Muncil for Canadian Senator Wilfrid Laurier McDougald, circa 1925.
62	Noyes Cottage	Noyes Cottage	November 6, 1992 (#92001468)	16 Helen St. 44°19′37″N 74°07′40″W	Saranac Lake (Harrietstown)	A "cure cottage" built in 1898.
63	Oval Wood Dish Factory	Oval Wood Dish Factory	March 2, 2021 (#100006198)	100-120 Demars Blvd. and 13 Dish Ave. 44°14′05″N 74°27′55″W	Tupper Lake	
64	Paddock Building	Paddock Building	November 7, 1976 (#76001218)	34 W. Main St. 44°50′54″N 74°17′41″W	Malone	Built in 1848, it was believed to be the oldest extant commercial building in Franklin County. It burned in 2017 and was demolished in 2021.
65	Pomeroy Cottage	Pomeroy Cottage	November 6, 1992 (#92001447)	26 Baker St. 44°20′01″N 74°07′55″W	Saranac Lake	A built about 1910, it may have been designed as a private "cure cottage" by William G. Distin.
66	Prospect Point Camp	Prospect Point Camp	November 7, 1986 (#86002947)	E of NY 30; 44°16′43″N 74°20′42″W	Saranac Inn	An Adirondack Great Camp designed by William L. Coulter for New York copper magnate and financier Adolph Lewisohn in 1903.
67	Radwell Cottage	Radwell Cottage	November 6, 1992 (#92001456)	2 Charles St. 44°19′50″N 74°08′17″W	Saranac Lake (Harrietstown)	An intact 1896 "cure cottage".
68	Ryan Cottage	Ryan Cottage	November 6, 1992 (#92001445)	62 Algonquin Ave. 44°19′06″N 74°09′10″W	Saranac Lake (Harrietstown)	An 1893 Queen Anne-style "cure cottage".
69	St. Regis Presbyterian Church	St. Regis Presbyterian Church	2020 (#100005708)	Keese Mill Road; 44°25′57″N 74°18′02″W	Keese Mill	A c. 1898 church built by Paul Smith on the bank of the St. Regis River
70	Sarbanes Cottage	Sarbanes Cottage	November 6, 1992 (#92001451)	72 Bloomingdale Ave. 44°19′51″N 74°07′40″W	Saranac Lake (Harrietstown)	A "cure cottage" built about 1930.
71	Orin Savage Cottage	Orin Savage Cottage	November 6, 1992 (#92001422)	33 Olive St. 44°19′40″N 74°08′08″W	Saranac Lake	A "cure cottage" built about 1910.
72	Schrader-Griswold Cottage	Schrader-Griswold Cottage	November 6, 1992 (#92001432)	49 Riverside Dr. 44°19′18″N 74°07′41″W	Saranac Lake (Harrietstown)	A 1906 Queen Anne-style "cure cottage".
73	Seeley Cottage	Seeley Cottage	November 6, 1992 (#92001423)	27 Olive St. 44°19′41″N 74°08′06″W	Saranac Lake (Harrietstown)	An intact "cure cottage" built in 1890.
74	Sloan Cottage	Sloan Cottage	November 6, 1992 (#92001442)	21 View St. 44°19′20″N 74°08′09″W	Saranac Lake (Harrietstown)	A Coulter and Westhoff-designed single-family "cure cottage" built in 1907.
75	Smith Cottage	Smith Cottage	November 6, 1992 (#92001470)	12 Jenkins St. 44°19′04″N 74°08′23″W	Saranac Lake (Harrietstown)	A "cure cottage" for a single patient built about 1903.
76	Paul Smith's Electric Light and Power and Railroad Company Complex	Paul Smith's Electric Light and Power and Railroad Company Complex	November 2, 1987 (#87001898)	2 Main St. 44°19′27″N 74°07′57″W	Saranac Lake	Headquarters of the 1907 company formed by hotelier Paul Smith.
77	St. Regis Mountain Fire Observation Station	St. Regis Mountain Fire Observation Station	March 15, 2005 (#05000163)	Saint Regis Mountain; 44°24′50″N 74°18′55″W	Santa Clara	A 35-foot (11 m) Aermotor LS40 steel tower erected in 1918 by the Conservation Commission.
78	Stonaker Cottage	Stonaker Cottage	November 6, 1992 (#92001465)	Glenwood Rd. 44°18′57″N 74°08′07″W	Saranac Lake (Harrietstown)	A private home built in 1916 for the president of Northern New York Telephone who used it as a "cure cottage".
79	U.S Inspection Station–Chateaugay, New York	U.S Inspection Station–Chateaugay, New York	September 10, 2014 (#14000861)	NY 374; 44°59′35″N 74°05′09″W	Chateaugay	U.S. Border Inspection Stations MPS
80	U.S. Inspection Station–Fort Covington, New York	U.S. Inspection Station–Fort Covington, New York	September 10, 2014 (#14000575)	Dundee Road; 44°59′26″N 74°44′22″W	Fort Covington	U.S. Border Inspection Stations MPS
81	U.S. Inspection Station–Trout River, New York	U.S. Inspection Station–Trout River, New York	September 10, 2014 (#14000576)	NY 30; 44°59′31″N 74°18′30″W	Trout River	U.S. Border Inspection Stations MPS
82	US Post Office-Malone	US Post Office-Malone	May 11, 1989 (#88002350)	482 E. Main St. 44°50′55″N 74°17′23″W	Malone	A 1934 Classical Revival-style post office building designed by the Office of the Supervising Architect of the Treasury, Louis A. Simon.
83	Chester Valentine House	Chester Valentine House	February 23, 2015 (#15000028)	182 Lake St. 44°19′21″N 74°08′32″W	Saranac Lake	A 1932 Strathmore model Sears kit house
84	Walker Cottage	Walker Cottage	November 6, 1992 (#92001424)	67 Park Ave. 44°19′57″N 74°08′01″W	Saranac Lake (Harrietstown)	A 1904 Colonial Revival-style house that evolved into a "cure cottage".
85	Wilder Homestead	Wilder Homestead	November 19, 2014 (#09000720)	177 Stacy Rd. 44°52′05″N 74°12′56″W	Burke	The Wilder Homestead was the boyhood home of Almanzo Wilder; it is an historic home and farmstead near Malone. The two-story, Greek Revival style frame dwelling was built in 1843.
86	Wilson Cottage	Wilson Cottage	November 6, 1992 (#92001443)	8 Williams St. 44°19′42″N 74°08′11″W	Saranac Lake	An intact Queen Anne-style "cure cottage".
87	Witherspoon Cottage	Witherspoon Cottage	November 6, 1992 (#92001415)	3 Kiwassa Rd. 44°19′12″N 74°07′46″W	Saranac Lake	A boardinghouse-style "cure cottage" built in 1910.

== Former listings ==
	Name on the Register	Image	Date listed	Date removed	Location	City or town	Description
1	Paul Smith's Hotel Store		December 3, 1980 (#80002612)	February 6, 1983	Paul Smith's College campus	Paul Smiths	Demolished in April 1982.

== See also ==
- National Register of Historic Places listings in New York
