= Malone (disambiguation) =

Malone is a surname.

Malone may also refer to:

== Places ==
=== Northern Ireland ===
- Malone Road in Balmoral, Belfast
- Malone, Belfast
- Upper Malone
- Malone Park

=== United States ===
- Malone, Florida
- Malone, Iowa
- Malone, Kentucky
- Malone (town), New York
  - Malone (village), New York
    - Malone Armory, National Guard armory in New York
    - Malone Freight Depot, railroad freight depot located at Malone
- Malone, Oregon
- Malone, Texas
- Malone, Washington
- Malone, Wisconsin
- Malone Auxiliary Field, military airfield north-northeast of Marianna, Florida
- Malone Creek
- Malone Formation, a geologic formation in Texas

=== Other places ===
- Malone River in Piedmont, Italy

== Colleges ==
- Malone University, a private college in Canton, Ohio
- Malone College, Belfast, an integrated secondary school in Northern Ireland

== Other uses ==
- Malone (film), a 1987 film starring Burt Reynolds
- Malone Golf Club, golf club near Belfast
- Malone RFC, a rugby club in Belfast
- "Malone" (2000AD), a 2000 AD story
- Malone Society, publication andscholarly society devoted to the study of 16th- and early 17th-century drama
- Mashti Malone's, ice cream chain in Los Angeles, California

== See also ==
- Bugsy Malone, a 1976 musical film
- "Molly Malone", a Dublin song
