= Fort Covington (CDP), New York =

Fort Covington, New York
- Census-designated place
- Location within New York Location within the United States
- Coordinates: 44°59′18″N 74°29′47″W
- Country: United States
- State: New York
- County: Franklin
- Town: Fort Covington

Area
  - Total: 19.36 sq mi (50.15 km^{2})
  - Land: 19.35 sq mi (50.12 km^{2})
  - Water: 0.012 sq mi (0.03 km^{2})
- Elevation: 170 ft (52 m)

Population (2020)
  - Total: 1,127
  - Density: 58.2/sq mi (22.49/km^{2})
- Time zone: UTC-5 (Eastern (EST))
  - Summer (DST): UTC-4 (EDT)
- ZIP Codes: 12937 (Fort Covington); 12914 (Bombay)
- Area code: 518
- FIPS code: 36-26752
- GNIS feature ID: 2584256

Fort Covington is a census-designated place (CDP) within the town of Fort Covington, Franklin County, New York, United States. It consists of the hamlet of Fort Covington, as well as a large amount of rural land surrounding the hamlet, such that the CDP occupies about one half of the area within the town limits. The population of the CDP was 1,308 at the 2010 census, out of a total town population of 1,676.

== Geography ==
The Fort Covington CDP occupies the northern half of the town of Fort Covington, with the actual hamlet situated in the northern part of the CDP, along the Salmon River, just south of the Canada–United States border. According to the United States Census Bureau, the CDP has a total area of 19.33 square miles (50.07 km^{2}), of which 19.32 square miles (50.04 km^{2}) is land and 0.01 square miles (0.03 km^{2}), or 0.05%, is water.

New York State Route 37 runs east to west across the CDP, leading southeast 15 miles (24 km) to Malone, the Franklin County seat, and west 21 miles (34 km) to Massena. Cornwall, Ontario, is 16 miles (26 km) to the northwest of Fort Covington via NY 37 and the Three Nations Crossing over the St. Lawrence River.

The northern border of the CDP, which follows the town line, is the international border with Canada. The Fort Covington–Dundee Border Crossing connects Dundee Road, leading south into the center of Fort Covington, with Quebec Route 132, which leads northeast along the south shore of the St. Lawrence River, 32 miles (51 km) to Salaberry-de-Valleyfield. Montreal is 70 miles (110 km) northeast of Fort Covington.

== Demographics ==
Historical population
Census	Pop.	Note	%±
2020	1,127		—
U.S. Decennial Census

== Education ==
The school district is Salmon River Central School District.
