= Trout River Border Crossing =

Canada–United States border crossing

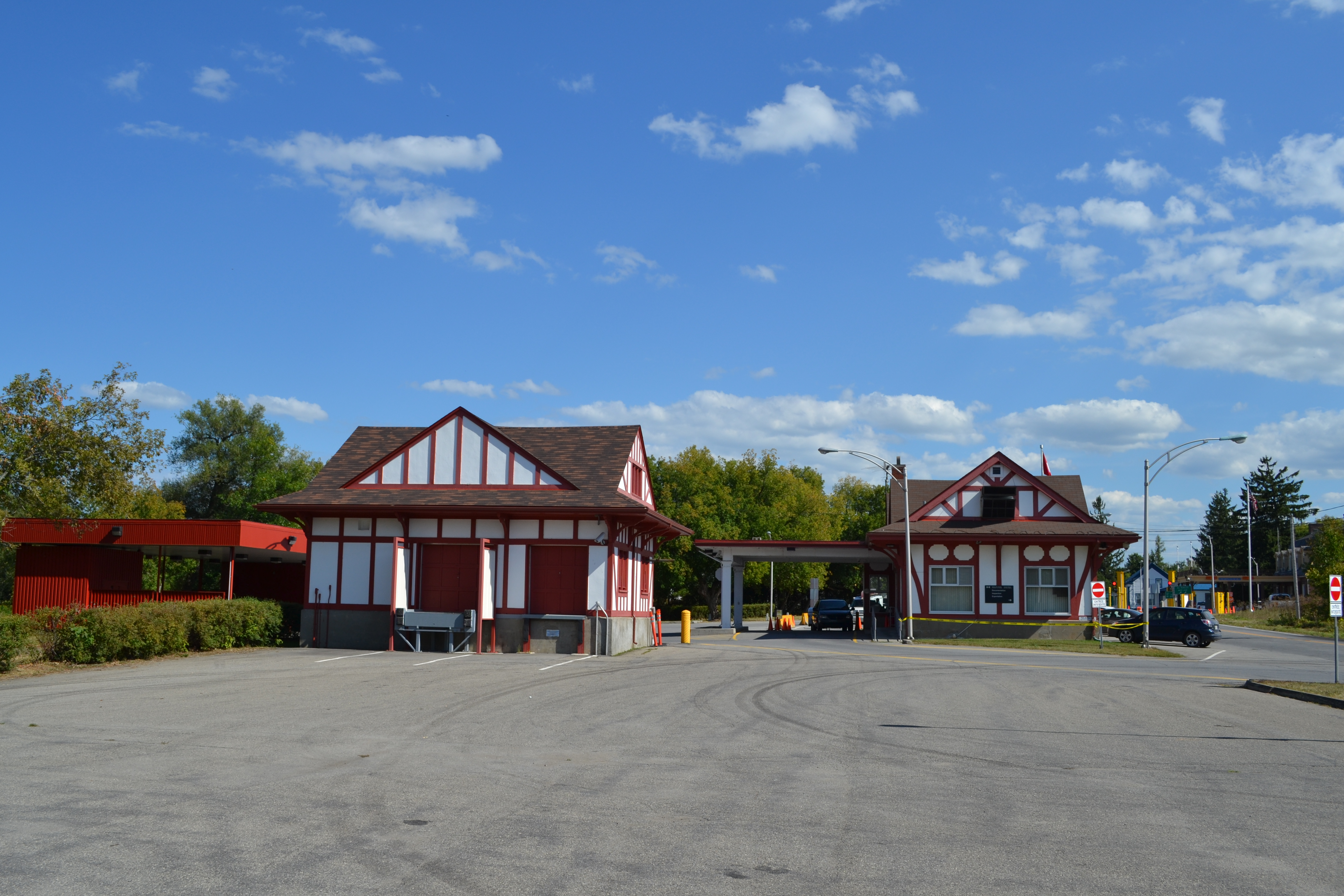
- Canadian Border Station at the Trout River border crossing

Location
- Country: United States; Canada
- Location: NY 30 / R-138; US Port: 17013 State Route 30, Constable, New York 12926; Canadian Port: 980 Highway 138, Elgin, Quebec J0S 2E0
- Coordinates: 44.992062°N 74.308208°W

Details
- Opened: 1933

Website
- https://www.cbp.gov/contact/ports/trout-river-new-york-0715
- U.S. Inspection Station–Trout River, New York
- U.S. National Register of Historic Places
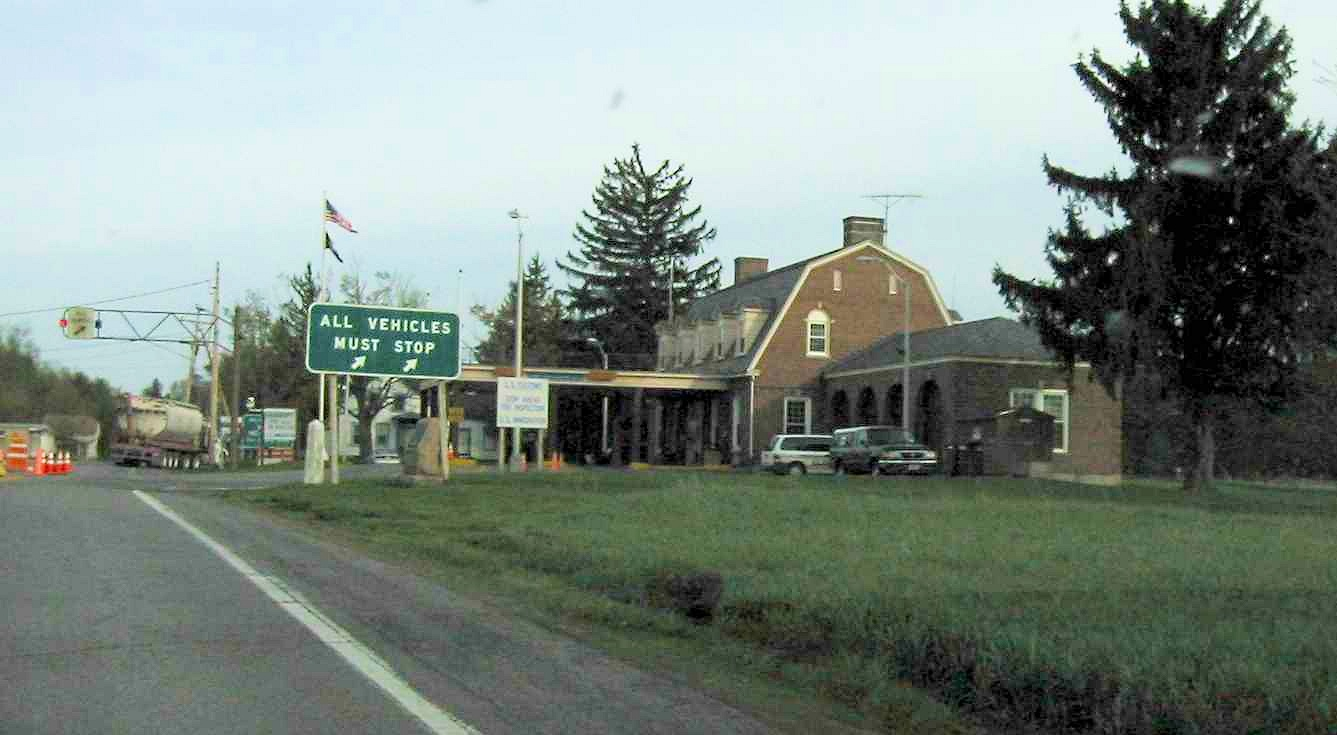
- US Border Inspection Station at Trout River, NY

- Location within New York Location within the United States
- Location: NY 30, Trout River, New York
- Coordinates: 44°59′31″N 74°18′30″W
- Built: 1931-1932
- Architects: Office of the Supervising Architect under Louis A. Simon and James A. Wetmore
- Architectural style: Georgian Revival
- MPS: U.S. Border Inspection Stations MPS
- NRHP reference No.: 14000576
- Added to NRHP: September 10, 2014

Trout River is a border crossing connecting Elgin, Quebec to Constable, New York on the Canada–US border, most prominently featuring the Trout River Border Inspection Station. The crossing can be reached by New York State Route 30 on the American side and by Quebec Route 138 on the Canadian side.

Historically, Trout River was the primary crossing of the Trout River, NY port of Entry. This distinction is due to the fact that the U.S. Customs and Border Protection (CBP) defines a port of entry as 'any designated place at which a CBP officer is authorized to accept entries of merchandise to collect duties, and to enforce the various provisions of the customs and navigation laws'. This means that the border stations of Fort Covington and Churubusco are facilities of the Trout River Port of Entry.

There are several buildings near this crossing that were built prior to the establishment of the US-Canada border in 1842. These include a former duty-free shop and two residences.

== US Border Facilities at Trout River ==
The Trout River Border Inspection Station is one of seven existing border inspection stations built on the New York - Quebec border between 1931 and 1934. In 2014, it, along with others around the country built during this period, was listed on the National Register of Historic Places.

=== Architectural Significance ===
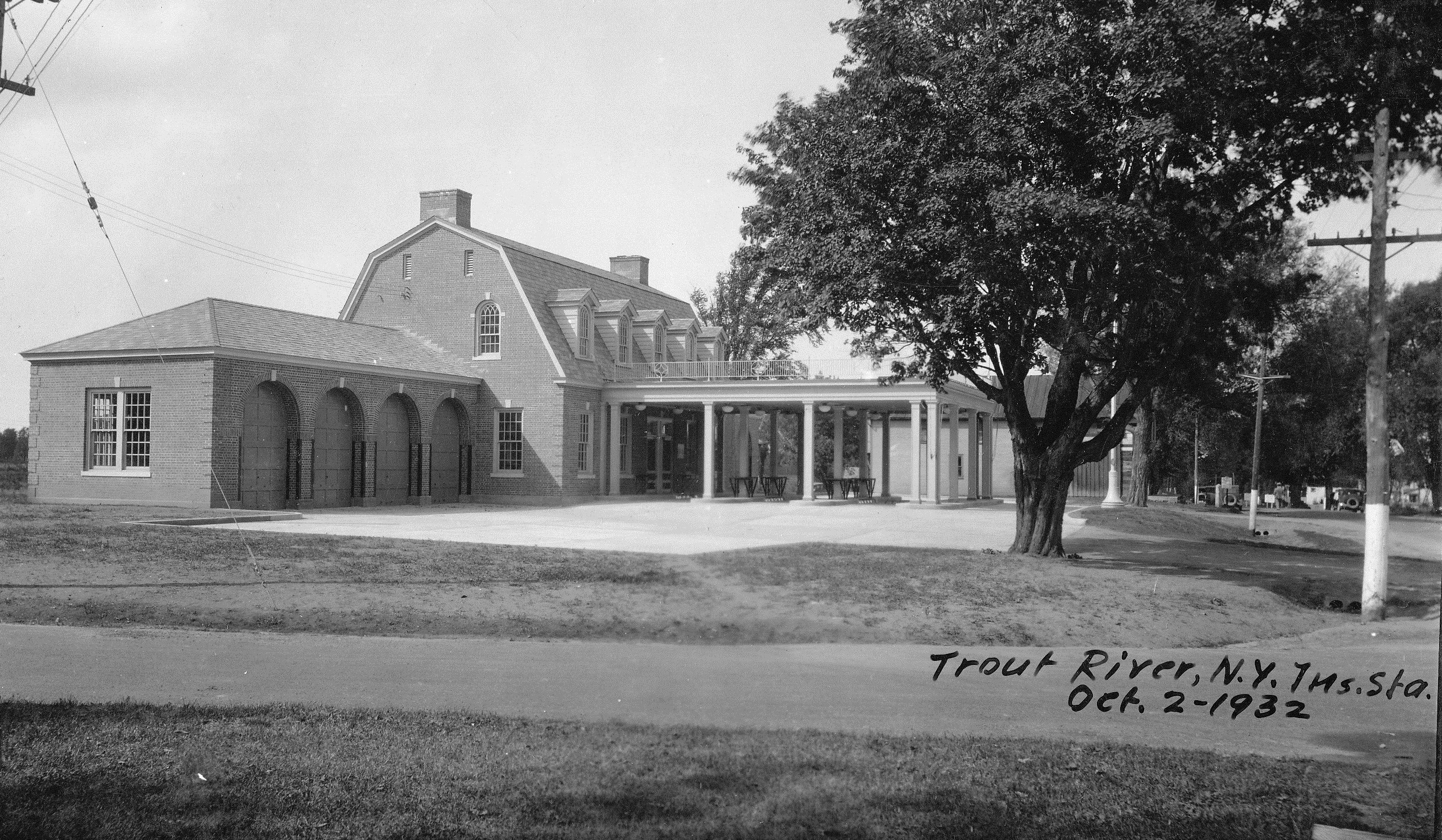
US border station at Trout River as seen in 1932

Border Stations are associated with four important events in United States history: the imposition of Prohibition between 1919 and 1933; enactment of the Elliott-Fernald Public Buildings Act in 1926 which was followed closely by the Great Depression; and the growth of the automobile whose price was increasingly affordable thanks to Henry Ford's creation of the industrial assembly line. The stations were constructed as part of the government's program to improve its public buildings and to control casual smuggling of alcohol which most often took place in cars crossing the border. Their construction was also seen as a means of giving work to the many locally unemployed.

The Trout River border station is one of the best preserved in New York. While the border stations have all sustained systematic alterations, they have retained, in varying degrees, most of their original fabric. This station is on both exterior and interior a fine example of the building type, its character defining features well-maintained and intact. The building was designed by the Office of the Supervising Architect under James A. Wetmore, during the tenure of Treasury Secretary Andrew W. Mellon, and constructed from 1931 to 1932. At the time of its construction, Louis A. Simon was Superintendent of the Architectural Section. Border stations were constructed by the federal government in New England along the border with Canada during the 1930s and several common plans and elevations can be discerned among the remaining stations. Trout River shares with the others a residential scale, a Neo-colonial style, and an organization to accommodate functions of both customs and immigration services.

=== History ===
The era of Prohibition begun in 1919 with the Volstead Act and extended nationwide by the ratification of the Eighteenth Amendment in 1920, resulted in massive bootlegging along the Canada–US border. In New York, early efforts to control bootlegging were carried out by a small number of Customs officers and border patrol officers who were often on foot and horseback. In many cases New York Custom Houses were a mile or so south of the border and travelers were expected to stop in and report their purchases. The opportunity to remedy this situation and support enforcement of the Prohibition laws was offered by enactment of the Elliott-Fernald Public Buildings Act of 1926 which authorized the government through the Treasury Department to accelerate its building program and began its allocation with $150,000,000 which it later increased considerably.

Trout River was west of the so-called Rum Trail which made Route 9 the chief path of entry for bootlegged liquor in upstate New York. Bootleggers however, ran liquor across the border at Trout River and it was a vulnerable spot for smuggling . At the time Prohibition was repealed, the Trout River border inspection station had been in operation for two years. However, the end of Prohibition did not mean the end of smuggling, as the public had developed a taste for Canadian liquor and its bootleggers had discovered the money that could be made smuggling raw alcohol into Canada where prices for it were considerably higher. Trout River continued to operate to interdict this activity.

While the seven New York border inspection stations had been designated for construction as early as 1929, land acquisition and the designing and bidding process was stalled at various stages for each of the buildings and their construction took place unevenly over a period of five years. Trout River was the first station to be constructed. It is still in active use. The Trout River Border Inspection Station is one of seven border stations in New York which are eligible for the National Register, having national, state and local significance.

The station is associated with three events which converged to make a significant contribution to the broad patterns of our history: Prohibition, the Public Buildings Act of 1926 and the mass-production of automobiles. Although this border station was not completed until a year before the repeal of Prohibition, it was planned and built as a response to the widespread bootlegging which took place along the border with Canada and continued to serve as important role after 1933 when smuggling continued in both directions across the border.

Conceived in a period of relative prosperity, the Public Buildings Act came to have greater importance to the country during the Depression and funding was accelerated to bring stimulus to state and local economies by putting to work many of the unemployed in building and then manning the stations. Local accounts make clear the number of jobs the station created. Local labor was used to build the station and Trout River residents were appointed customs inspectors.

The Trout River Border Inspection Station is associated with the life of Louis A. Simon, FAIA, who as Superintendent of the Architect's Office and then as Supervising Architect of the Procurement Division of the United States Treasury Department was responsible for the design of hundreds of government buildings between 1905 and 1939. During his long tenure with the government, Simon, trained in architecture at MIT, was instrumental in the image of the government projected by its public buildings, an image derived from classical western architecture, filtered perhaps through the English Georgian style or given a regional gloss, but one which continues to operate in the collective public vision of government. Simon was unwavering in his defense of what he considered a "conservative-progressive" approach to design in which he saw "art, beauty, symmetry, harmony and rhythm".

The station at Trout River is an example of the choice of the Georgian Revival style which was considered appropriate for the upstate New York region. Its construction is of the highest quality materials and workmanship. It has integrity of setting associated with its function, and has retained the integrity of its materials.

=== Architectural description ===
The Trout River Border Inspection Station in located on the north east corner of the intersection of New York State Route 30 and the Westville Road in a small cluster of buildings which date c.1850 to 1900. The Canada border station is in view on the north while open space surrounds this rural village in all directions. From the north, pavement markings and signage divert cars to the station's three lane inspection bays via an oval, concrete drive. The east facing building is set on a flat, grass covered lot, 57,270 square feet in area, flanked by two mature hemlock trees which appear to be over fifty years old. Public parking is provided on the south side of the building.

The red-brick station is an example of Georgian Revival architecture. It was built in a three-part plan composed of a 1 1/2-story center block with two single-story wings on its north and south facades and a three-lane inspection canopy extending from its east facade. The center block is five bays wide with five clapboard-sided, front gable dormers placed on the slate-covered gambrel roof on both east and west elevations. There are two interior end chimneys. Brickwork quoins ornament the building corners with cast-stone keystones and sills at each of the window openings. On the first floor, sash is the original 12/12. On the second floor, the dormer window openings are arched with 8/8 Gothic sash. The center entry has a replacement glass-and-aluminum door.

The north and south wings of the building are divided into four arched vehicle bays on the east and four bays of 12/12 sash on the west facade. They are a single bay in width beneath slate-covered hip roofs. Quoins are repeated at the wing corners. On the south wing, the inspection shed, one bay has been converted to a handicapped bathroom which is entered beneath a small wooden hood. On the north wing, the garage, one bay opening has been altered to serve as a pedestrian entry. The flat-roofed inspection canopy which extends to the east in three lanes is topped by a wrought iron railing on three sides and supported by a combination of five original paneled wooden piers and seven replacement metal columns.

On the interior of the main block the first floor is divided into a public vestibule and office space by two L-shaped, panelled counters. Separating the immigration offices from the customs offices on each side of the space is a relatively narrow wood stairway to the basement and second floor. Interior finishes throughout the building are largely intact with plaster walls and ceilings, and architrave door surrounds. Flooring on the first level is original red tile set in a concrete border. Linoleum has been added in the offices. The basement is devoted to mechanical rooms with the unusual exception of two room size safes.

The second floor is divided into office spaces, with two bathrooms which retain their original pedestal sinks, tile floor and walls and wooden stall partitions. New lighting fixtures have been hung throughout the building. In 1958 the alterations to the canopy supports were made and in 1968 the main entry was replaced, and the accessible bathroom was added. A back-up generator was installed in 1976 in the basement.

== Canadian Border Facilities at Trout River ==
The Canada border station at the Trout River crossing is a neo-Tudor design. It is a 1 1/2-story, Tudor Revival structure with a gabled roof and dormers. It also has and bell cast eaves supported on heavy brackets. Stucco walls contrast with decorative half timbering that was originally charcoal-colored, is currently painted red. The designation is confined to the footprint of the building. Built in 1933, the CBSA border station at Trout River is among the oldest border facilities still in operation. The Tudor style was used at other border stations such as Beebe and Lacolle. This building was designated by the Federal Heritage Buildings Review Office as a Recognized Federal Heritage Building in 1991.

== See also ==
- List of Canada–United States border crossings
- National Register of Historic Places listings in Franklin County, New York
