= Malone-Dufort Airport =

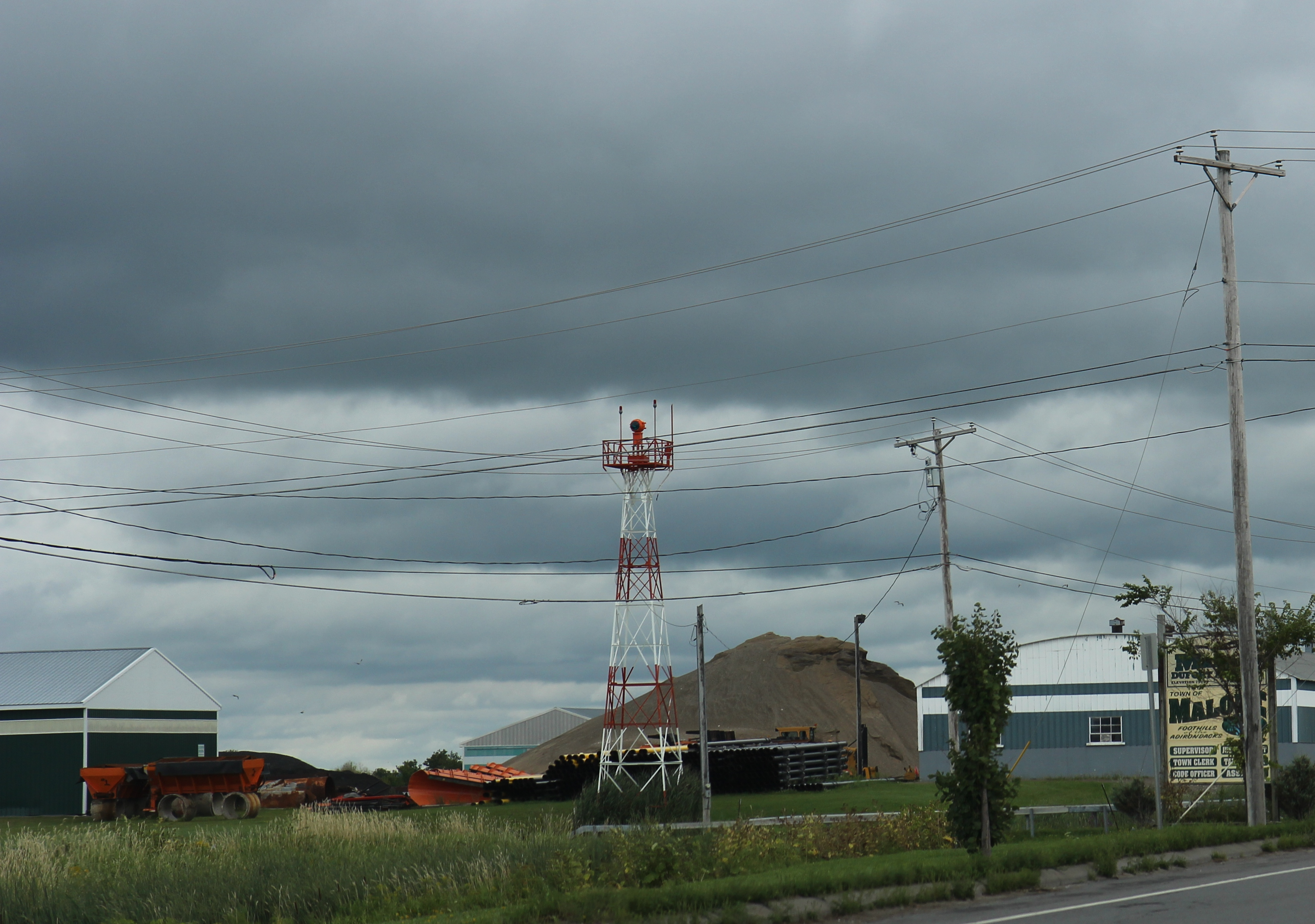
- IATA: none; ICAO: KMAL; FAA LID: MAL

Summary
- Airport type: Public
- Owner: Town of Malone
- Serves: Malone, New York
- Elevation AMSL: 790 ft / 241 m
- Coordinates: 44°51′13″N 074°19′44″W

Map

Runways
Direction	Length		Surface
Direction	ft	m	Surface
5/23	4,000	1,219	Asphalt
14/32	3,245	989	Asphalt

Statistics (2007)
- Aircraft operations: 8,700
- Based aircraft: 14
- Source: Federal Aviation Administration

Malone-Dufort Airport (ICAO: KMAL, FAA LID: MAL) is two miles west of Malone, a village in the Town of Malone, Franklin County, New York. The FAA's National Plan of Integrated Airport Systems for 2009–2013 categorized it as a general aviation facility.

Many U.S. airports use the same three-letter location identifier for the FAA and IATA, but this facility is MAL to the FAA and has no IATA code (IATA assigned MAL to Mangole, Indonesia).

The first airline flights were Colonial DC-3s in 1948; successor Eastern pulled out in 1959.

== Facilities ==
Malone-Dufort Airport covers 135 acres (55 ha) at an elevation of 790 feet (241 m). It has two asphalt runways: 5/23 is 4,000 by 100 feet (1,219 x 30 m) and 14/32 is 3,245 by 75 feet (989 x 23 m).

In the year ending December 7, 2007 the airport had 8,700 aircraft operations, average 23 per day: 92% general aviation, 6% air taxi, and 2% military. 14 aircraft were then based at the airport: 86% single-engine and 14% multi-engine.

== See also ==
- List of airports in New York
