= Anselm Lincoln House =

Historic house in New York, United States

- U.S. National Register of Historic Places
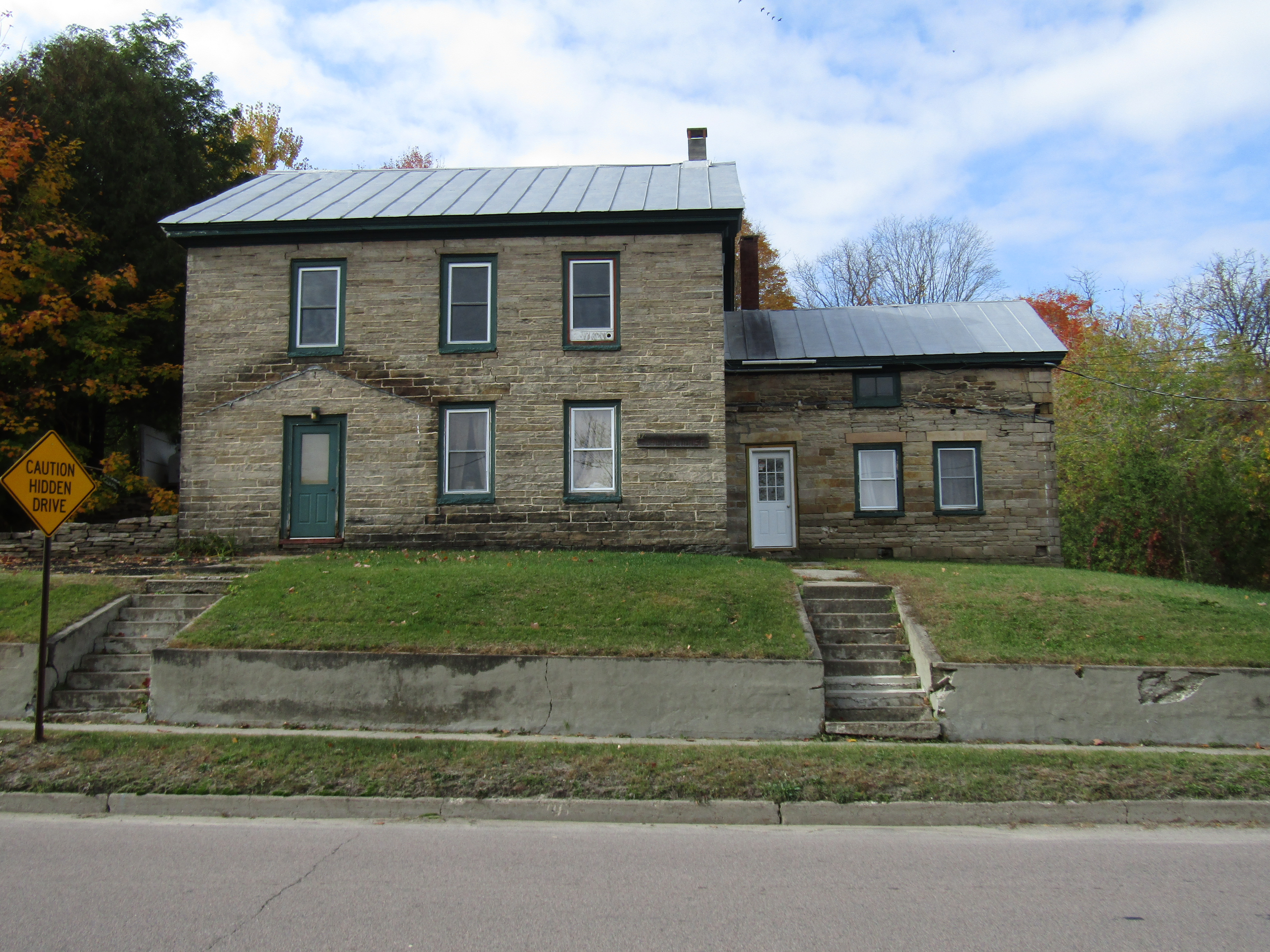

- Location within New York Location within the United States
- Location: 49 Duane St., Malone, New York
- Coordinates: 44°50′50″N 74°17′40″W
- Area: less than one acre
- Built: 1830
- NRHP reference No.: 75001189
- Added to NRHP: April 21, 1975

Anselm Lincoln House is a historic home located at Malone in Franklin County, New York. It was built in 1830 and has a 2-story rectangular main block, three bays long by two bays wide, and 1 1/2-story wing. It is built of beautifully cut and fitted ashlar block, two feet thick. It is believed to be the oldest stone house in Franklin County. It was donated to the North Country Community College in 1974.

It was listed on the National Register of Historic Places in 1975.
