= First Congregational Church (Malone, New York) =

Historic church in New York, United States

- U.S. National Register of Historic Places
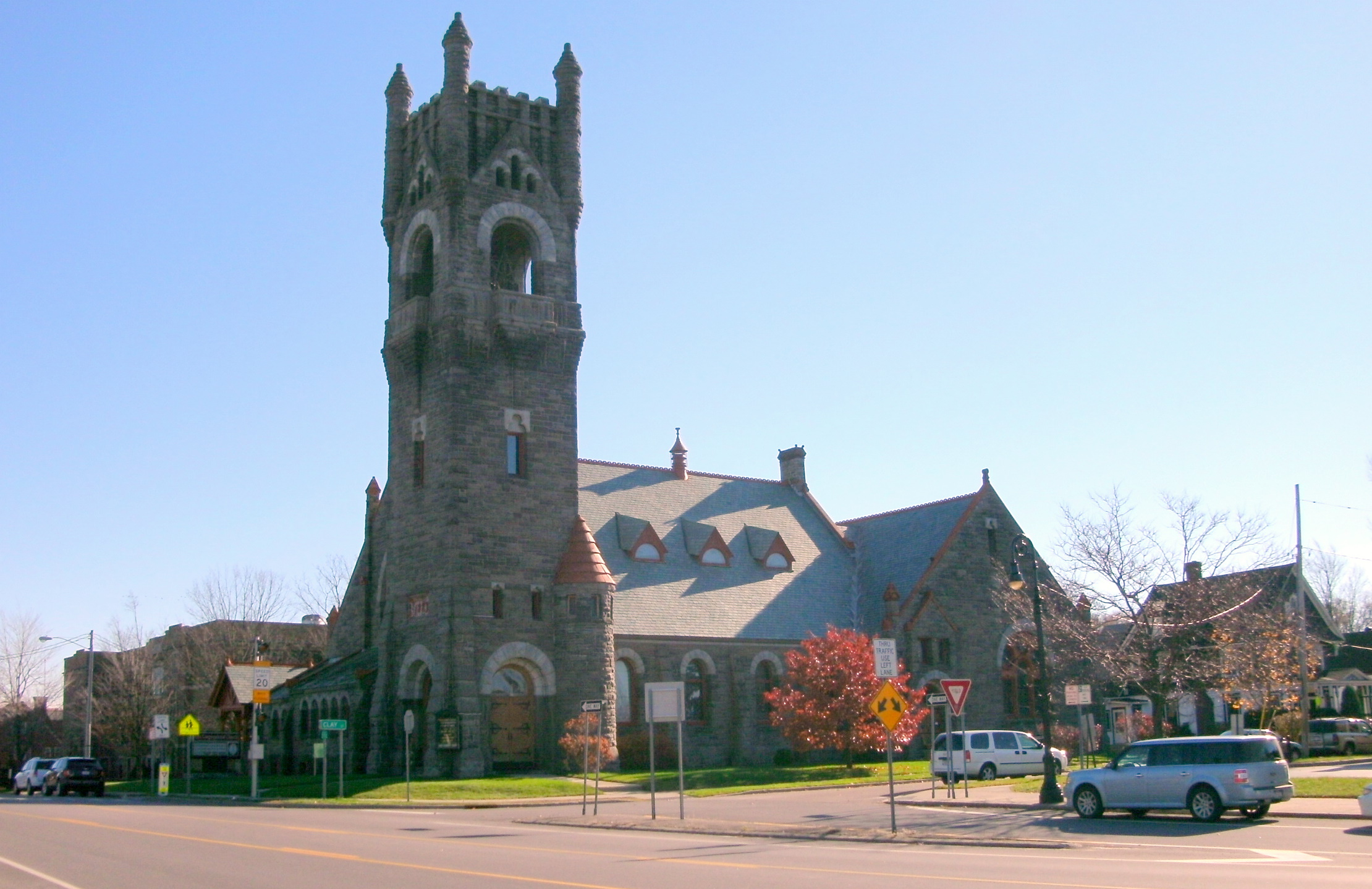
- First Congregational Church, November 2010

- Location within New York Location within the United States
- Location: 2 Clay St., Malone, New York
- Coordinates: 44.84901°N 74.28726°W
- Area: less than one acre
- Architect: Griffin, Tristram
- Architectural style: Romanesque
- NRHP reference No.: 91000627
- Added to NRHP: June 06, 1991

First Congregational Church is a historic church at 2 Clay Street in Malone, New York. The third building of the congregation on the site, it was built in 1883. The congregation was the first formed in Franklin County, NY, in 1807, with the first settled pastor in the county (Rev. Ashbel Parmelee). The congregation erected its first church building in 1826 and replaced that first stone building with a second, of brick, in 1852. It is this second building that is thought to have been built with passages to secret escaping slaves on their way to Canada. One of these tunnels is extant in the basement of the current church building. Vice President William A. Wheeler was a member of the church.

The building was added to the National Register of Historic Places in 1991.
