= Malone, New York =

- Village
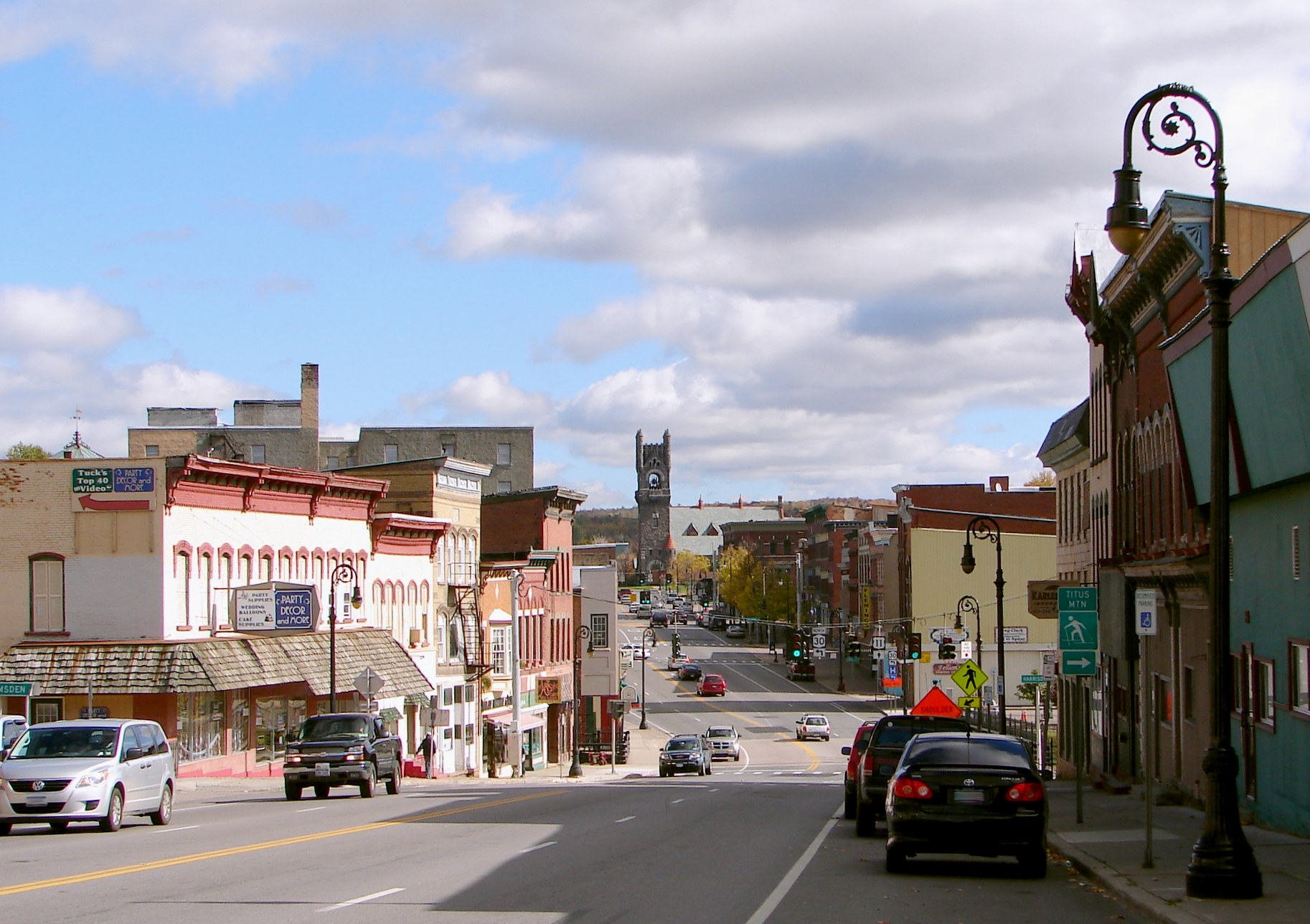
- Nickname: The Star of the North
- Location in the state of New York
- Coordinates: 44°51′2″N 74°17′20″W
- Country: United States
- State: New York
- County: Franklin
- Town: Malone

Government
  - Mayor: Andrea Dumas

Area
  - Total: 3.19 sq mi (8.25 km^{2})
  - Land: 3.12 sq mi (8.08 km^{2})
  - Water: 0.066 sq mi (0.17 km^{2})
- Elevation: 712 ft (217 m)

Population (2020)
  - Total: 5,483
  - Density: 1,757.8/sq mi (678.68/km^{2})
- Time zone: UTC-5 (Eastern (EST))
  - Summer (DST): UTC-4 (EDT)
- ZIP code: 12953
- Area code: 518
- FIPS code: 36-44710
- GNIS feature ID: 0956316
- Website: villageofmalone-ny.com

Malone is a village in and the county seat of Franklin County, New York, United States. According to the 2020 U.S. census, the village of Malone had a population of 5,483. The village is in the town of Malone; the village and the town are distinct municipalities with separate local governments. It is home to a campus of North Country Community College. It is located approximately 10 miles (16 km) from the Trout River, New York, border crossing into the province of Quebec, Canada, and less than two hours from Montreal, Canada.

== History ==
The community was first settled around 1802. During the War of 1812, the village was sacked by British troops making incursions from what would become Canada.

Perspective map of Malone from 1886 with list of landmarks by L.R. Burleigh

Malone was incorporated as a village in 1853 when it reached a population of 2,039. It served as a staging point for one arm of the 1866 and 1870 Fenian raids of Canada, which took place at many points along the Canada–United States border. The Fenian Brotherhood (Fenians) attempted to capture Canada to end British rule of Ireland.

Laura Ingalls Wilder wrote the book Farmer Boy about Almanzo Wilder, who attended Franklin Academy here. The school is now the site of the Malone Middle School, and the Wilder Homestead is a historical site that lies about 5 miles (8 km) east of the village of Malone in the town of Burke. The First Congregational Church, likely the one mentioned in Farmer Boy, was the first Christian congregation founded and the first church building built in Franklin County. There is anecdotal evidence that the second church building (1852–1883) was one of the final stops in the Underground Railroad. A tunnel for the persons seeking freedom can still be found in the church's basement.

Malone hosts the annual Franklin County Fair in August, featuring agricultural exhibits, livestock competitions, live music, tractor pulls, and demolition derbies. The fair was first held at its present site in 1852 and is depicted in Laura Ingalls Wilder’s novel Farmer Boy.

In 1998, the village suffered a natural disaster as part of the North American Ice Storm of 1998. On November 6, 2012, a proposal to dissolve the village into the surrounding town of Malone was defeated by a 2-to-1 margin, with village residents voting 1,117–562 to keep the village intact.

In addition to the First Congregational Church and Wilder Homestead, the Horton Gristmill, Anselm Lincoln House, Malone Armory, Malone Freight Depot, Paddock Building, and United States Post Office are listed on the National Register of Historic Places.

== Economy ==
Primarily a farming community, Malone is surrounded by dairy farms and potato producers, and was previously known for growing hops.

The New York Central and Rutland Railroads once had major switching and maintenance yards here.

Products manufactured in Malone included Sno-Pruf waterproofer for boots, woolen winter wear produced by Ballard Mill, and Sioux-Mocs slippers. Malone became known as the snowmobile capital of the United States when a local farm equipment dealer agreed to become the exclusive distributor for Bombardier Recreational Products east of the Mississippi.

Alice Hyde Medical Center, part of the University of Vermont Health network, has a large campus in the Village of Malone, which employs more than 750 people. Hudson Headwaters Health Network opened Malone Family Health, a primary care center on the Alice Hyde Medical Center campus, in March 2026.

Two state prisons are located in the vicinity and major employers. Franklin Correctional Facility, a medium-security prison, and Upstate Correctional Facility, a maximum-security prison.

Tourism is a major economic contributor, with Titus Mountain 6 miles (10 km) south of the village drawing skiers from the region. Malone Golf Club brings golfers from all over including Canada, and was established in 1903. It features two 18-hole courses, the East and West courses, and expanded to 36 holes in 1987 with designs by golf-course architect Robert Trent Jones.

The town of Malone is home to Malone-Dufort Airport, a public-use airport west of the village that serves the area’s general aviation needs, including business and recreational flying.

Retail businesses in the Malone area include locally owned shops and chain stores such as Walmart, Runnings, and Marshalls, with shopping areas along Main Street and the U.S. Route 11 corridor.

== Geography ==
Malone village is located in the northern part of the town of Malone at 44°51′2″N 74°17′20″W (44.850676, −74.28907), in north-central Franklin County.

According to the United States Census Bureau, the village has a total area of 3.18 square miles (8.23 km^{2}), of which 3.11 square miles (8.06 km^{2}) is land and 0.066 square miles (0.17 km^{2}) 2.08%, is water.

Malone is at the convergence of U.S. Route 11, New York State Route 11B (NY 11B), NY 30, and NY 37. County Road 25 enters the village from the south. US-11 leads east 46 miles (74 km) to Champlain and southwest 37 miles (60 km) to Potsdam. NY-30 leads south 58 miles (93 km) to Tupper Lake in the Adirondacks and north 11 miles (18 km) to Trout River at the Canada–US border. Cornwall, Ontario, is 31 miles (50 km) to the northwest via NY-37.

The Salmon River, a tributary of the St. Lawrence River, flows northward through the village.

=== Climate ===
The climate of Malone is hemiboreal (Köppen climate classification "Dfb").

Climate data for Malone, NY
Month	Jan	Feb	Mar	Apr	May	Jun	Jul	Aug	Sep	Oct	Nov	Dec	Year
Mean daily maximum °F (°C)	23 (−5)	26 (−3)	35 (2)	49 (9)	64 (18)	72 (22)	76 (24)	74 (23)	66 (19)	54 (12)	41 (5)	29 (−2)	51 (10)
Mean daily minimum °F (°C)	4 (−16)	7 (−14)	18 (−8)	31 (−1)	44 (7)	53 (12)	57 (14)	55 (13)	47 (8)	36 (2)	27 (−3)	13 (−11)	33 (0)
Average precipitation inches (mm)	2.36 (60)	2.00 (51)	2.24 (57)	2.74 (70)	2.92 (74)	3.87 (98)	4.19 (106)	4.63 (118)	3.65 (93)	3.27 (83)	3.41 (87)	2.53 (64)	37.81 (961)
Source: The Weather Channel

== Demographics ==
Historical population
Census	Pop.	Note	%±
1880	4,193		—
1890	4,986		18.9%
1900	5,935		19.0%
1910	6,467		9.0%
1920	7,556		16.8%
1930	8,657		14.6%
1940	8,743		1.0%
1950	9,501		8.7%
1960	8,737		−8.0%
1970	8,048		−7.9%
1980	7,668		−4.7%
1990	6,777		−11.6%
2000	6,075		−10.4%
2010	5,911		−2.7%
2020	5,483		−7.2%
U.S. Decennial Census

At the 2020 census, the village of Malone had a population of 5,483 and a population density of 1,757.9 inhabitants per square mile (678.7/km²). The U.S. Census Bureau estimated its population at 5,315 in July 2025.

According to the 2020–2024 American Community Survey estimates, the village had 2,662 households and 3,018 housing units, with an average household size of 1.98 people. Approximately 51.7% of occupied housing units were owner-occupied.

The estimated median age was 43.4 years. Among residents aged 25 and older, 92.3% had completed high school or higher, and 24.0% held a bachelor’s degree or higher.

According to the U.S. Census Bureau’s 2020–2024 American Community Survey estimates, the median household income in the Village of Malone was $60,548, and the per capita income was $32,843, both expressed in 2024 dollars; an estimated 22.2% of residents lived below the poverty line.

== Government and infrastructure ==
The town and village of Malone are distinct municipalities with separate local governments; the village lies within the town and serves as the county seat of Franklin County. Healthcare services include Alice Hyde Medical Center, part of University of Vermont Health, and Hudson Headwaters Health Network’s Malone Family Health primary care center, both located in the village. Major roads serving the area include U.S. Route 11 and New York State Routes 11B, 30, and 37. Malone-Dufort Airport, located in the town west of the village, serves business and recreational aviation. Upstate Correctional Facility and Franklin Correctional Facility, operated by the New York State Department of Corrections and Community Supervision, and the Franklin County Jail are located in the town outside the village limits.

== Education ==
Malone is served by the Malone Central School District, which provides public education from pre-kindergarten through twelfth grade through Davis, Flanders, and St. Joseph’s elementary schools, Malone Middle School, and Franklin Academy, the district’s public high school.The school district is Malone Central School District. The District's High School is the Franklin Academy.

The village in the town of Malone is home to a campus of North Country Community College.

== Notable people ==
Notable people associated with Malone include William A. Wheeler, vice president of the United States from 1877 to 1881, who was born in Malone and attended Franklin Academy; musician Bob Mould, known for his work with Hüsker Dü and Sugar, who was born and raised in Malone; and instrument maker Orville Gibson, founder of the Gibson instrument company, who was born in nearby Chateaugay and later lived and made instruments in Malone.
