= Fort Covington–Dundee Border Crossing =

Canada–United States border crossing

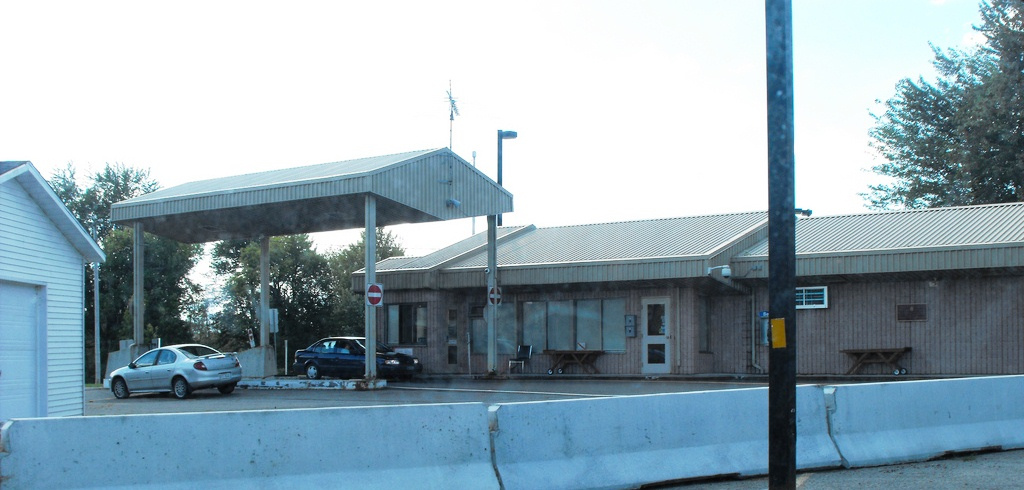
- Dundee, Quebec Canada Border Inspection Station

Location
- Country: United States; Canada
- Location: R-132 / Dundee Road; US Port: Water Street, Fort Covington, New York 12937; Canadian Port: 8750 Route 132, Dundee, Quebec J0S 1L0
- Coordinates: 44.997968°N 74.507795°W

Details
- Opened: 1844

Website
- https://www.cbp.gov/contact/ports/trout-river-new-york-0715
- U.S. Inspection Station–Fort Covington, New York
- U.S. National Register of Historic Places
- Location within New York Location within the United States
- Location: Dundee Road, Fort Covington, New York
- Built: 1933
- Architect: Office of the Supervising Architect under Louis A. Simon and James A. Wetmore
- Architectural style: Colonial Revival
- MPS: U.S. Border Inspection Stations MPS
- NRHP reference No.: 14000575
- Added to NRHP: September 10, 2014

Fort Covington–Dundee is a border crossing connecting Dundee, Quebec, in Canada to Fort Covington, New York, on the Canada–United States border. It can be reached by Quebec Route 132 on the Canadian side and by Dundee Road on the American side. The crossing is notable because the boundary line crosses through the now-defunct Taillon's International Hotel, shown as a line on the terrazzo floor, where it was possible to order a drink in Canada and play pool in the United States. The hotel was built in 1820, prior to the Webster–Ashburton Treaty of 1842, which redefined this section of the international border. The proprietors now operate cross border parcel service. The front door is in New York and the back Quebec. The Customs house is just on the other side of the parking lot.

Prior to construction of the current Dundee border station, Canada Customs was operated out of the McMillon Residence. The current US border station was constructed in the early 1930s. In 2014 the border inspection station on the U.S. side was listed on the National Register of Historic Places.

The border crossing is the westernmost in Quebec.

== US Border facilities at Fort Covington ==
=== Architectural description ===
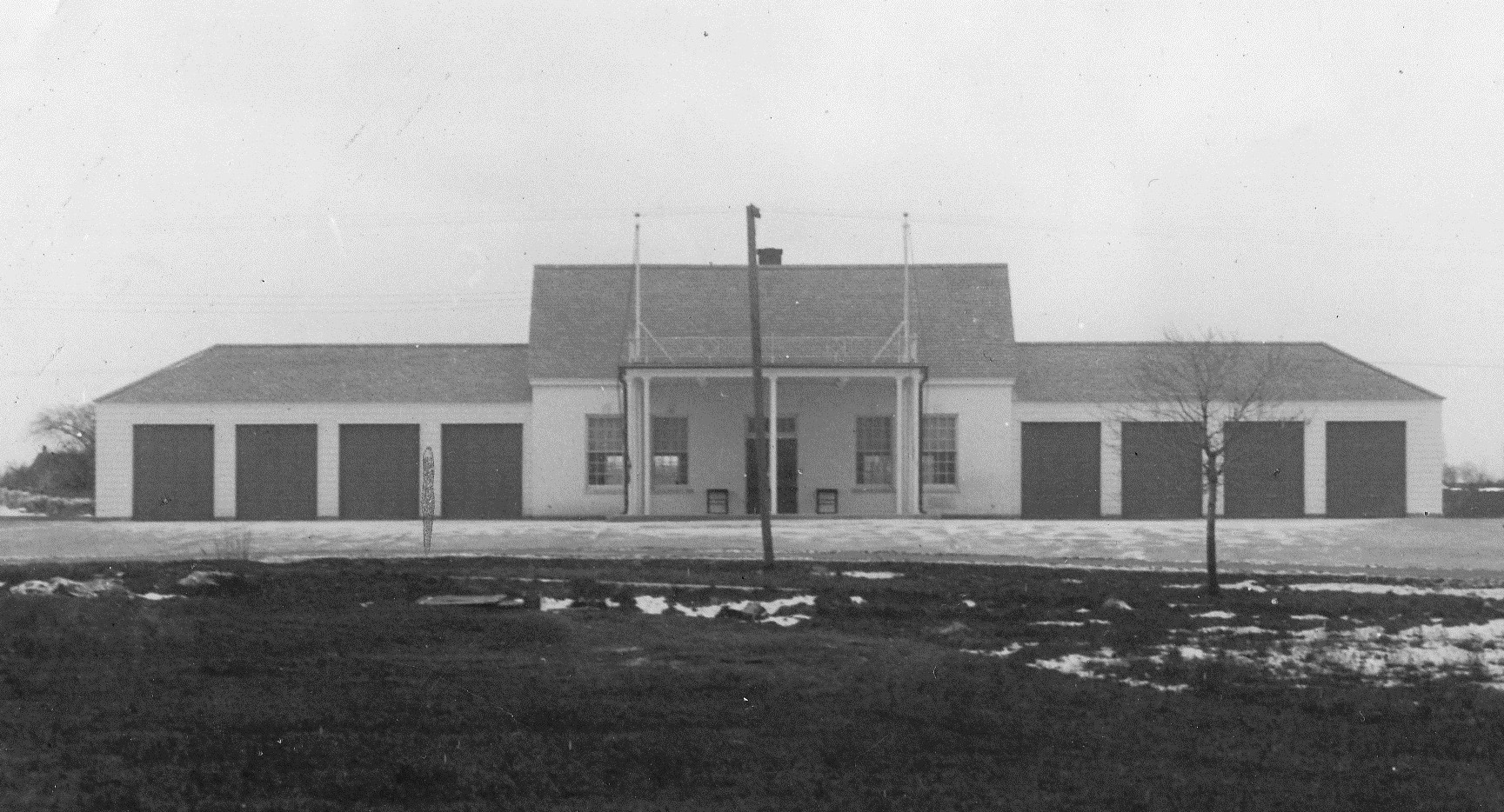
Fort Covington border station, as seen in 1933

The Fort Covington Border Inspection station is located on the west side of Dundee Road in Fort Covington, New York, on a 188,000-square-foot (17,500 m^{2}) lot. Set in an agricultural area, the station faces open fields on the east and has farms on the south. About 100 feet (30 m) west of the building is the Salmon River. The Canadian inspection station is within sight to the north. Cars are directed to the station from the north via an oval drive from the road. While the site is surrounded by open fields and bordered by the river, it has been landscaped in a formal arrangement typically found at border stations, with a series of evergreen trees spaced across the side and rear yard. Fort Covington, however, also has mature hardwoods at the river edge. North of the station on the river is a docking area where docks are placed in season. Signs alert boaters to the border, and a walkway leads from the inspection dock area to the station. There is a provision for car parking south of the station.

The station is three-part in plan, with a one and a half-story, white painted brick central block and two single-story weatherboarded wings on the north and south. The central block is five bays wide beneath a steeply pitched, end gable, slate roof. Unlike the other similar stations, there are not dormers on both sides of the roof, rather there is a shed roof dormer on the west side of the roof only, and one interior brick chimney. Windows are 12/12 vinyl replacement sash on the first floor and 8/8 vinyl replacement sash in the second floor dormer. There is a glass and aluminum replacement entry on the east with a single leaf door and sidelight beneath a transom.

The wings are four bays long and one bay wide under hipped, slate covered roofs. The south wing is an inspection shed for vehicles and that on the north is a garage for government vehicles. All four garage bays on the south have been filled in: two were sealed, one enclosed with a pedestrian door, the fourth with a pair of handicap accessible bathrooms entered beneath a door hood. There is a new aluminum overhead door at the end of this wing. On the north wing, four bays have new wood overhead garage doors sheltered by a new standing seam metal and wood pent roof. Its end bay retains the paired 12/12 sash. The west facades of both wings have three and four bays of 12/12 sash.

A two-lane inspection canopy on steel capped columns extends from the main block of the building at eaves level. A portion of the canopy over the outer lane was enlarged and raised in 1972, but the canopy section closer to the building is topped by segments of its original wrought iron railing. At the easternmost end of the canopy is a flag pole island with a wrought iron railing.

On the first-floor interior, a vestibule is formed by two parallel panelled counters on left and right of the entry. There are two small bathrooms directly across from the entry to the right of a stair which connects the basement to the second floor. Left of the stair the space is divided into an office by a wall with three glass windows and a door topped by glass transoms, all added in 1935. The area on the right is unpartitioned. Interior finishes are typical for the border stations with plaster walls, architrave door surrounds, picture rail and baseboards defining the spaces. The first floor has been laid with a new tile surface in the public area. Original lighting fixtures have been replaced with ceiling hung fluorescent fixtures.

The cement-floored basement is divided into two mechanical rooms and a storage-mechanical room. The two end rooms have their original ornamental, two-panelled doors with patterned panels. The second floor has hardwood and linoleum floors and two side by side detention rooms with their original barred and panelled entry doors, replacement sinks, and toilets. There is one office room and a long eaves room across the east which is used for storage.

=== Building details ===
Square footage		Building dimensions	
Floor area total:	4648	Stories/levels:	2
First floor area:	2698	Perimeter:	362 (linear ft.)
Occupiable area:	0	Depth:	0 (linear ft.)
		Height:	26 (linear ft.)
		Length:	0 (linear ft.)

=== Construction history ===
Start year	End year	Description	Architect
1932	0	Original construction	
1935	0	New partitions in immigration office	GSA
1972	0	Canopy renovation & misc. improvements	GSA

=== Architectural significance ===
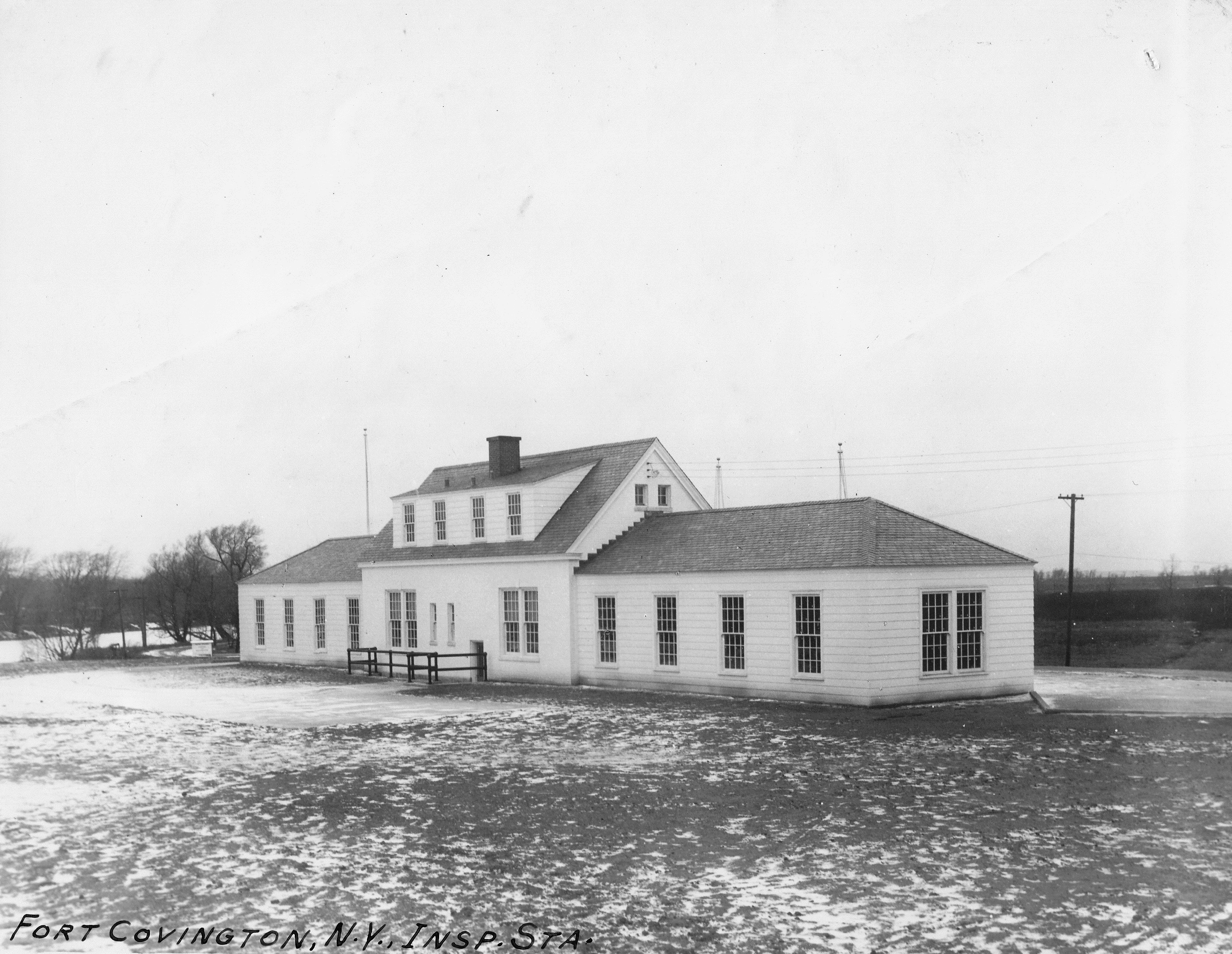
Rear view of the Fort Covington border station as seen in 1933

The Fort Covington Border Inspection Station in Fort Covington, New York, is one of seven existing border inspection stations built between 1931 and 1934 along the Canada–US border. Colonial Revival in style, the building was designed by the Office of the Supervising Architect under Louis A. Simon, and constructed in 1933 during the tenure of William H. Woodin, Secretary of the Treasury, Lawrence W. Robert, Jr. Assistant and James A. Wetmore Acting Supervising Architect. Border stations were constructed by the federal government in several New England states along the border with Canada during the 1930s and several common plans and elevations can be discerned among the remaining stations. Fort Covington shares with the others a residential scale, a Neo-colonial style, and an organization to accommodate functions of both customs and immigration services.

Border stations are associated with four important events in United States history: the imposition of Prohibition between 1919 and 1933; enactment of the Elliott-Fernald public buildings act in 1926 which was followed closely by the Depression; and the growth of the automobile whose price was increasingly affordable thanks to Henry Ford's creation of the industrial assembly line. The stations were constructed as part of the government's program to improve its public buildings and to control casual smuggling of alcohol which most often took place in cars crossing the border. Their construction was also seen as a means of giving work to the many locally unemployed.

The Fort Covington border inspection station is an example of the more modest, rural version of the border stations also found at Chateaugay, Champlain, Rouses Point (Overtons Corner), and Mooers, New York. While the stations have all sustained systematic alterations, they have retained, in varying degrees, most of their original fabric. This station is on both exterior and interior a good example of the building type, but of the five similar stations, it has been altered the most. It is the only station to control a border over both land and water. Drawings indicate that it was planned to have two inspection residences at the site, although none remains today.

=== History ===
The era of Prohibition begun in 1919 with the Volstead Act and extended nationwide by the ratification of the Eighteenth Amendment to the United States Constitution in 1920, resulted in massive bootlegging along the Canada–US border. In New York, early efforts to control bootlegging were carried out by a small number of Customs officers and border patrol officers who were often on foot and horseback. In many cases New York Custom Houses were a mile or so south of the border, and travelers were expected to stop in and report their purchases. The opportunity to remedy this situation and support enforcement of the Prohibition laws was offered by enactment of the Elliott-Fernald Public Buildings Act of 1926 which authorized the government through the Treasury Department to accelerate its building program and began its allocation with $150,000,000, which it later increased considerably.

Fort Covington was west of the so-called Rum Trail which made Rouses Point the chief point of entry for bootlegged liquor in upstate New York, but it was a necessary border station for control. At the time Prohibition was repealed, the Fort Covington border inspection station had just been completed. However, the end of Prohibition did not mean the end of smuggling, as the public had developed a taste for Canadian liquor, and its bootleggers had discovered the money that could be made smuggling raw alcohol into Canada where prices for it were considerably higher. Fort Covington continued to operate to interdict this activity.

While the seven New York border inspection stations had been designated for construction as early as 1929, land acquisition and the designing and bidding process was stalled at various stages for each of the buildings, and their construction took place unevenly over a period of five years. Fort Covington was constructed among the last of the stations. It is still in active use.

=== Statement of eligibility for the National Register of Historic Places ===
The Fort Covington Border Inspection Station is one of seven border stations in New York which are eligible for the National Register according to Criteria A, B and C. The stations have national, state and local significance.

The station is associated with three events which converged to make a significant contribution to the broad patterns of our history: Prohibition, the Public Buildings Act of 1926 and the mass-production of automobiles. Although this border station was not completed until a year before the repeal of Prohibition, it was planned and built as a response to the widespread bootlegging which took place along the border with Canada and continued to serve as important role after 1933 when smuggling continued in both directions across the border. The station has been in active use for 61 years.

Conceived in a period of relative prosperity, the Public Buildings Act came to have greater importance to the country during the Depression and funding was accelerated to bring stimulus to state and local economies by putting to work many of the unemployed in building and then manning the stations. Local accounts make clear the number of jobs the station created. Local labor was used to build the station and Fort Covington residents were appointed customs inspectors.

The Fort Covington Border Inspection Station is associated with the life of Louis A. Simon, FAIA, who as Superintendent of the Architect's Office and then as Supervising Architect of the Procurement Division of the United States Department of the Treasury was responsible for the design of hundreds of government buildings between 1905 and 1939. During his long tenure with the government, Simon, trained in architecture at MIT, was instrumental in the image of the government projected by its public buildings, an image derived from classical western architecture, filtered perhaps through the English Georgian style or given a regional gloss, but one which continues to operate in the collective public vision of government. Simon was unwavering in his defense of what he considered a "conservative-progressive" approach to design in which he saw "art, beauty, symmetry, harmony and rhythm". The debate which his approach stirred in the architectural profession may still be observed in the fact that he is often omitted in architectural reference works.

== See also ==
- List of Canada–United States border crossings
- National Register of Historic Places listings in Franklin County, New York
