= Lady Tree Lodge =

Historic house in New York, United States

- U.S. National Register of Historic Places
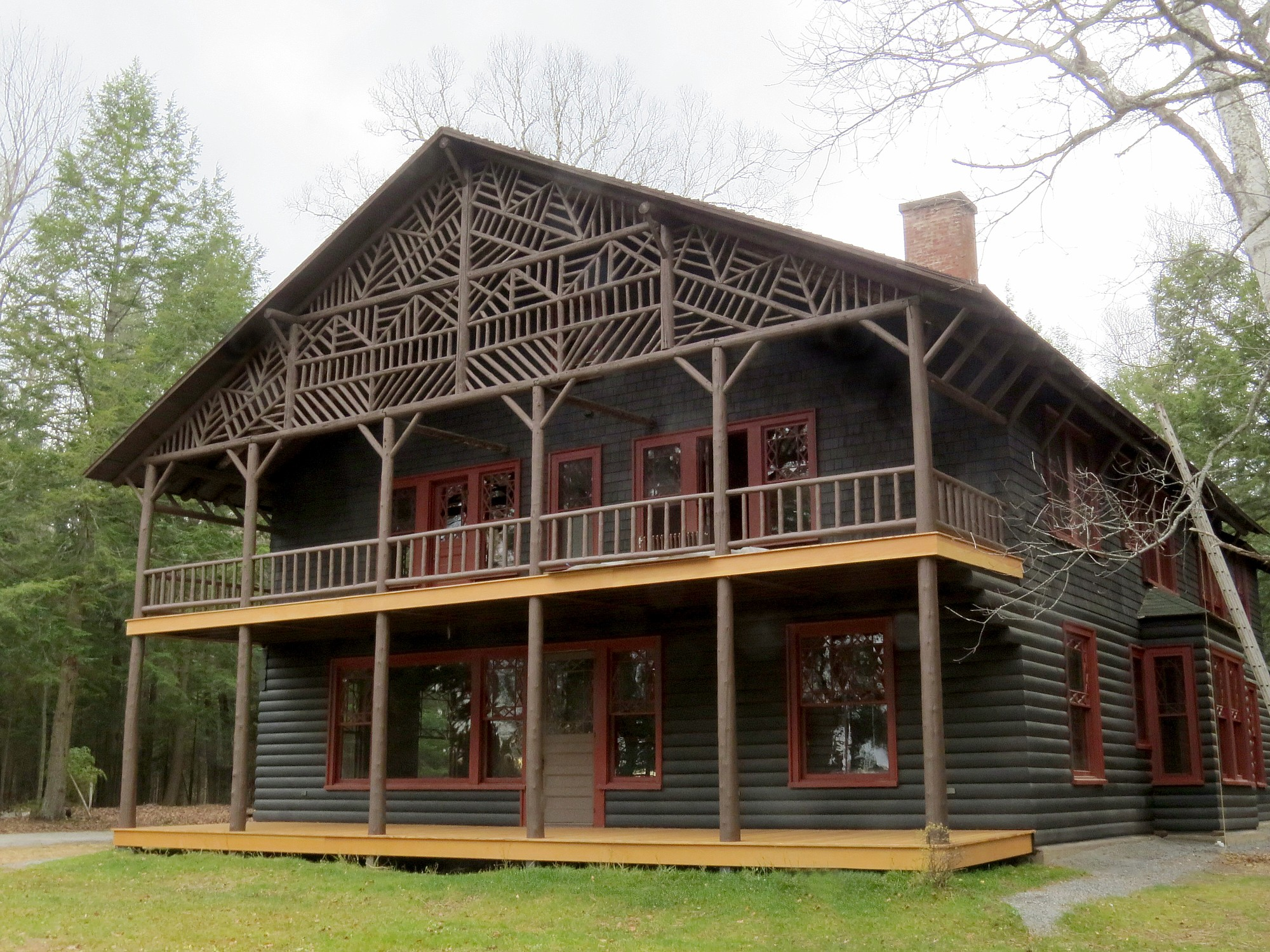
- Lady Tree Lodge

- Location within New York Location within the United States
- Location: 21 Loon Over Lane Saranac Inn, New York, U.S.
- Coordinates: 44.3460°N 74.3155°W
- Area: two acres
- Built: c. 1896
- Architectural style: Adirondack Great Camp
- MPS: Saranac Lake MPS
- NRHP reference No.: 100002188
- Added to NRHP: 2018

Lady Tree Lodge is a rustic cottage that was built about 1896 as part of Saranac Inn, and later used as summer residence by Texas newspaper publisher A. H. Belo and New York governor Charles Evans Hughes. It is at the northern end of Upper Saranac Lake. It was added to the National Register of Historic Places in 2018.
