= United States Post Office (Malone, New York) =

- US Post Office-Malone
- U.S. National Register of Historic Places
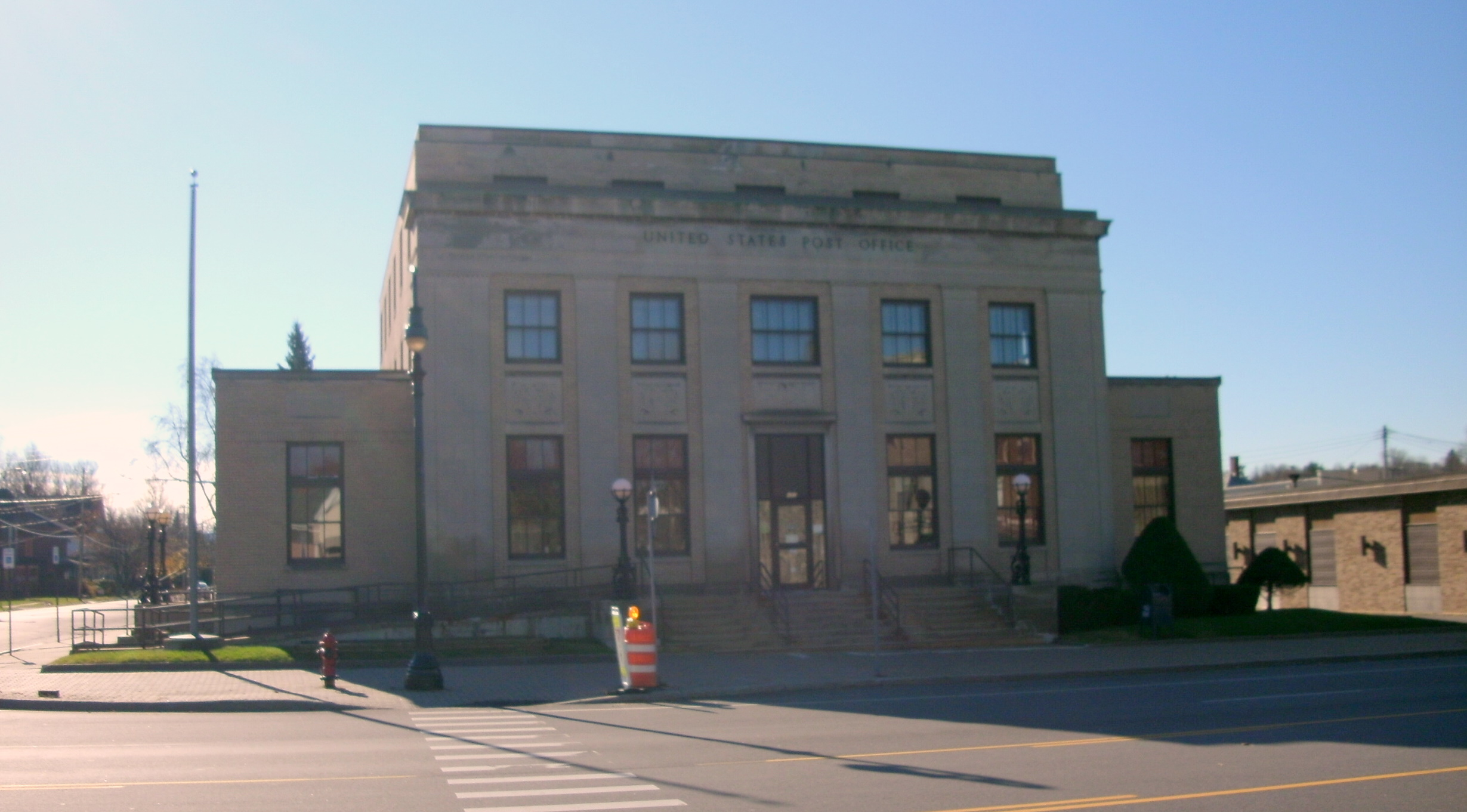
- United States Post Office, November 2010

- Location within New York Location within the United States
- Location: 482 E. Main St., Malone, New York
- Coordinates: 44°50′55″N 74°17′23″W
- Area: less than one acre
- Built: 1934
- Architect: Louis A. Simon
- Architectural style: Classical Revival
- MPS: US Post Offices in New York State, 1858-1943, TR
- NRHP reference No.: 88002350
- Added to NRHP: May 11, 1989

US Post Office-Malone is a historic post office building located at Malone in Franklin County, New York, United States. It was designed and built in 1934, and is one of a number of post offices in New York State designed by the Office of the Supervising Architect of the Treasury Department under Louis A. Simon. The building is in the Classical Revival style and is three stories in height with a five-bay, two-story entrance pavilion, one-story side wings and a two-story rear wing. It is of steel frame construction and clad in yellow brick trimmed with limestone.

It was listed on the National Register of Historic Places in 1989.
