= St. Regis Presbyterian Church =

- U.S. National Register of Historic Places
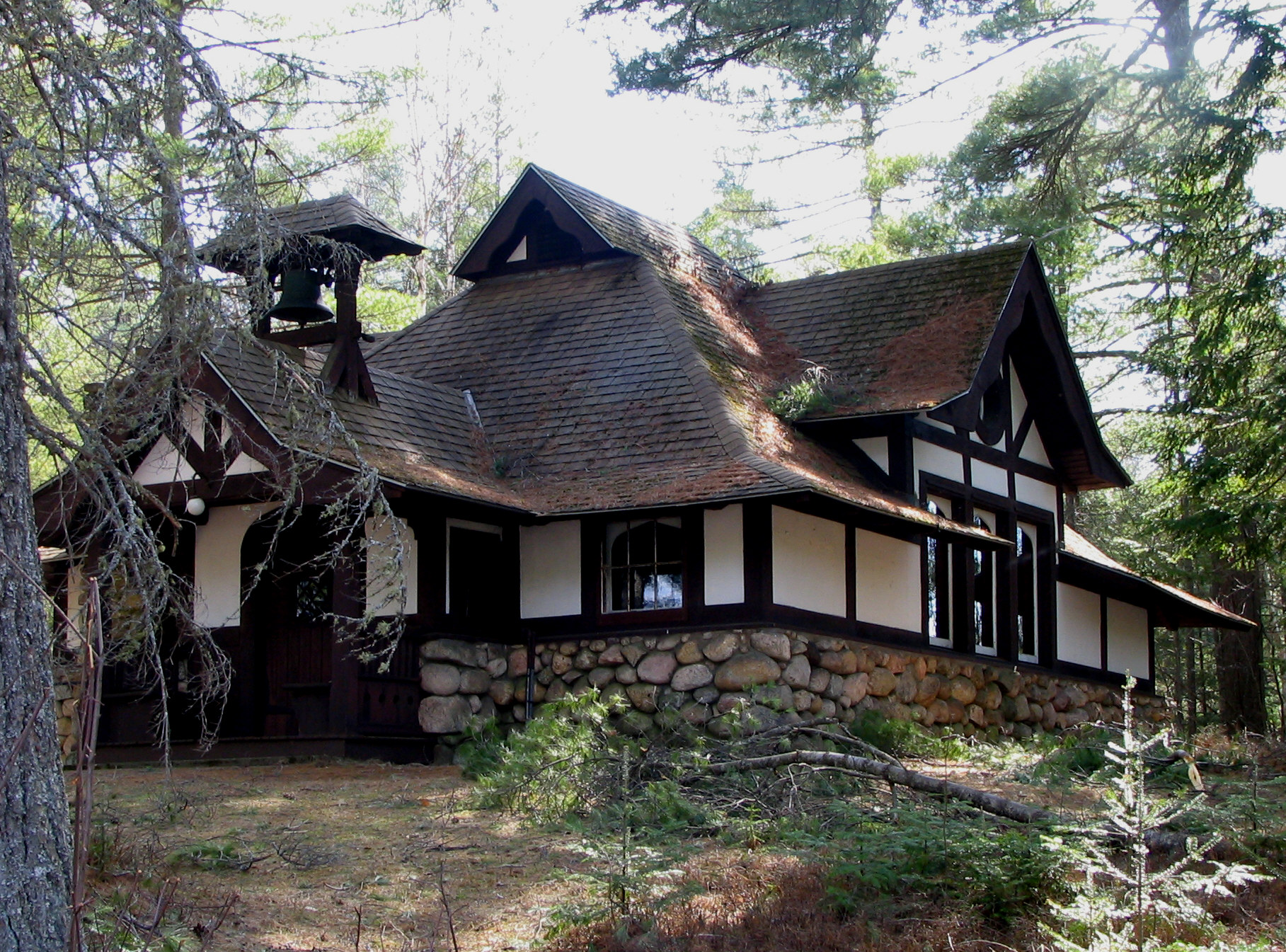
- St. Regis Presbyterian Church

- Location within New York Location within the United States
- Location: Keeses Mill Road, Keese Mill, New York, U.S.
- Coordinates: 44.4324°N 74.3006°W
- Area: 2.25 acres (0.91 ha)
- Built: c. 1898
- Architectural style: Tudor Revival
- NRHP reference No.: 100005708
- Added to NRHP: October 29, 2020

The St. Regis Presbyterian Church was founded by the Reverend William B. Lusk, who first conducted services in the Keese's Mills schoolhouse, and served as pastor from 1899 to 1906. Paul Smith donated land on the St. Regis River and summer residents on the St. Regis lakes donated the funds used to construct the church. The church was designed by Saranac Lake architect William L. Coulter.

The church was added to the National Register of Historic Places in 2020.
