= Horton Gristmill =

- U.S. National Register of Historic Places
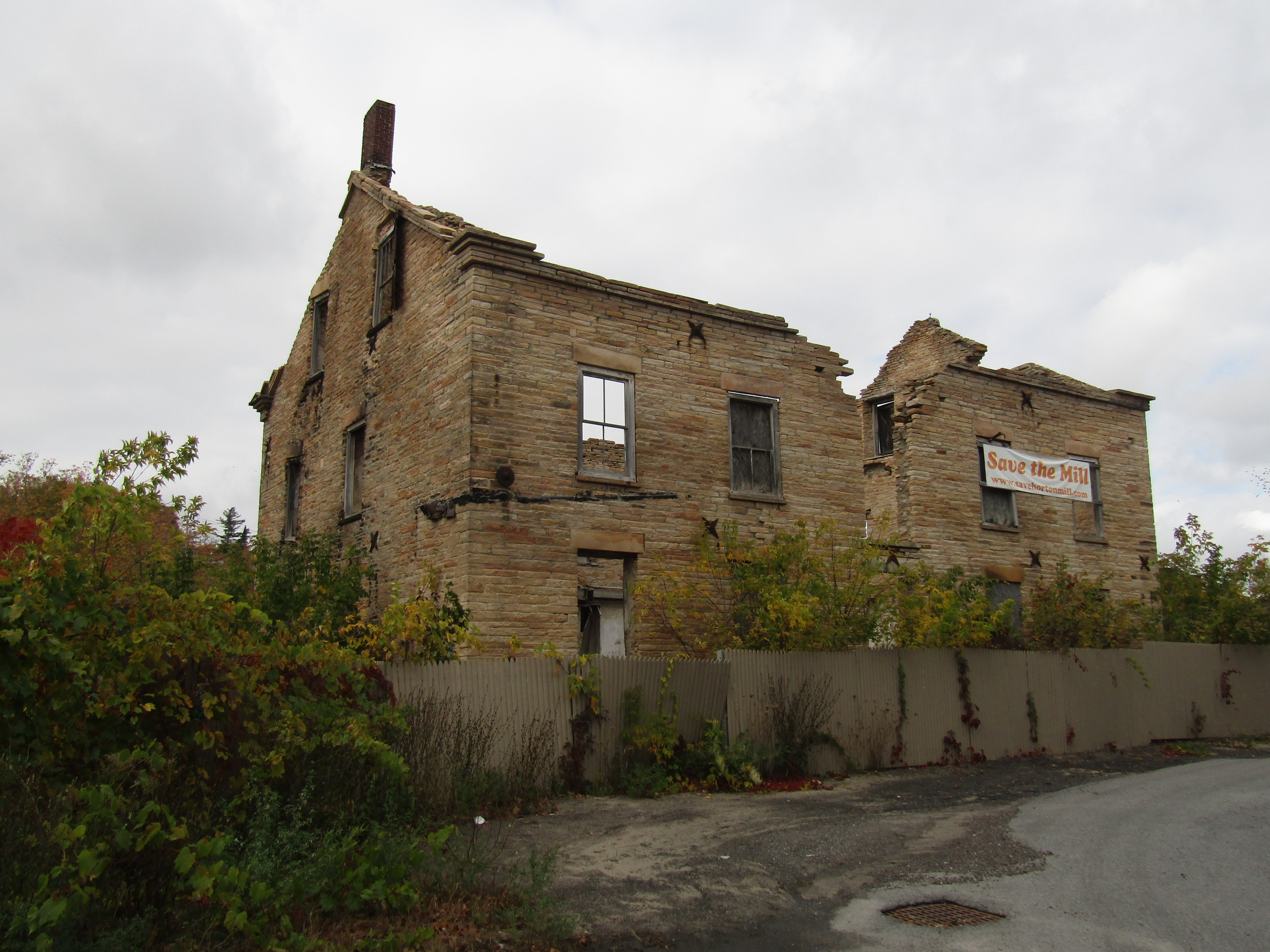
- Ruins of the mill in 2020

- Location within New York Location within the United States
- Location: Mill St., Malone, New York
- Coordinates: 44°50′52″N 74°17′35″W
- Area: less than one acre
- Built: 1853
- NRHP reference No.: 75001188
- Added to NRHP: April 21, 1975

Horton Gristmill is a historic grist mill located at Malone in Franklin County, New York. It was built in 1853 and is a 2 1/2-story rectangular building with a gable roof. It is built of Potsdam sandstone. From 1917 into the 1950s, it was operated by the Malone Milling Company.

It was listed on the National Register of Historic Places in 1975.
