= Paddock Building =

Historic commercial building in New York, United States

- U.S. National Register of Historic Places
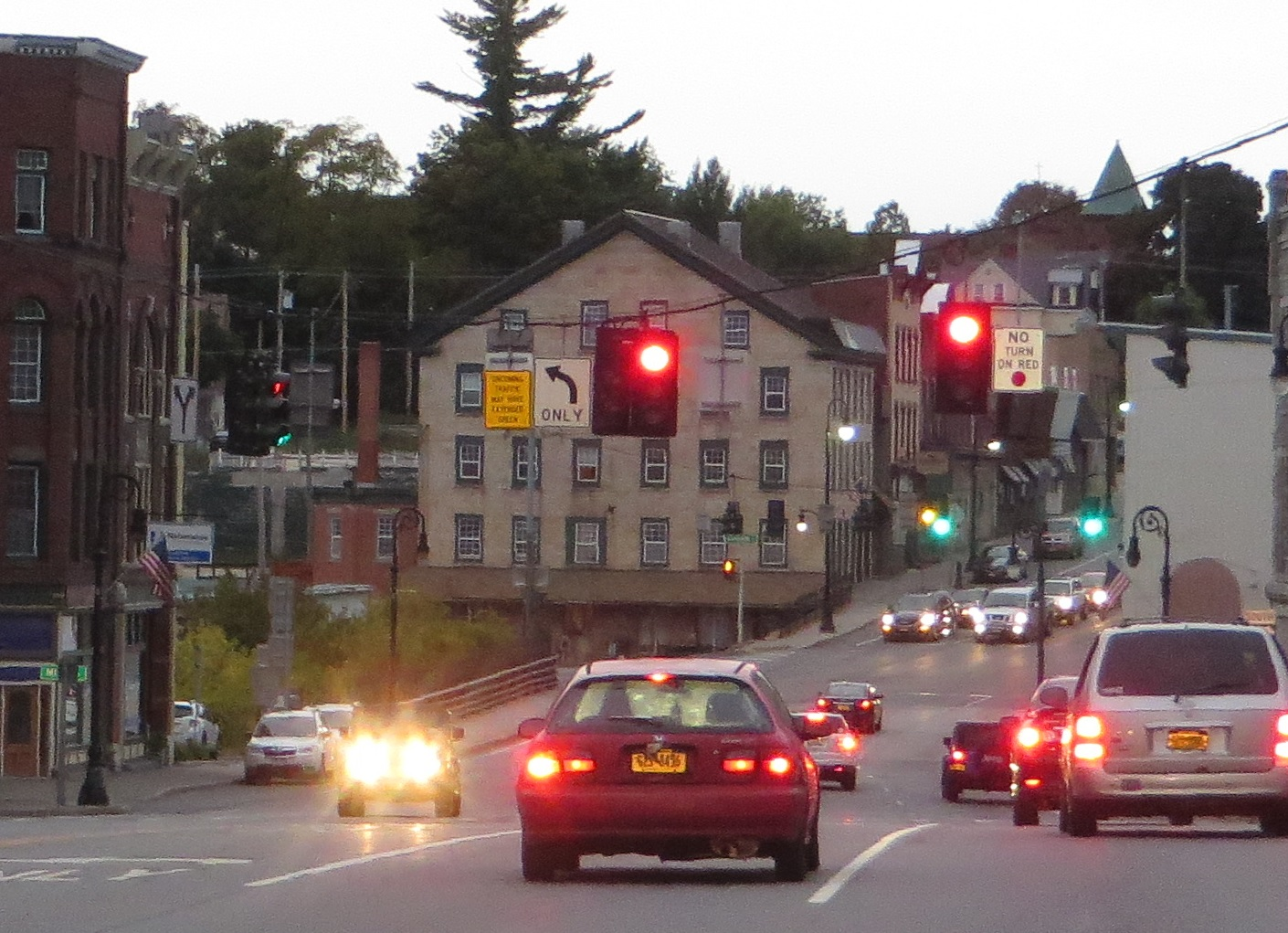
- The Paddock Building pictured before it burned in 2017.

- Location within New York Location within the United States
- Location: 384 W. Main St., Malone, New York
- Coordinates: 44°50′54″N 74°17′41″W
- Area: less than one acre
- Built: 1848
- Demolished: 2021
- NRHP reference No.: 76001218
- Added to NRHP: November 7, 1976

The Paddock Building, also known as the Gorman Building, was a historic commercial building located at 384 West Main Street in Malone, Franklin County, New York.

== Description and history ==
It was built in about 1848 and was a nearly square, six-bay-by-six-bay building with a rectangular rear wing. The main block was three and one half stories tall and rear wing was two stories. The walls were of sandstone construction and measure one and one half feet thick. It featured a stone arcade across the front façade. It was believed to be the oldest extant commercial building in Franklin County.

It was listed on the National Register of Historic Places on November 7, 1976.

In July 2017, the building―then in use for apartments―burned along with others on its block in a fire that killed one resident and injured dozens. While it was initially reported that the building could be restored, the site was instead designated for a modern, mixed-use affordable housing and retail development. In November 2021, demolition began on the Paddock Building's burned shell and six neighboring buildings. Construction on the new development began in July 2022.
