= Keese Mill, New York =

Hamlet in New York, United States

Coordinates: 44°25′57″N 74°17′46″W

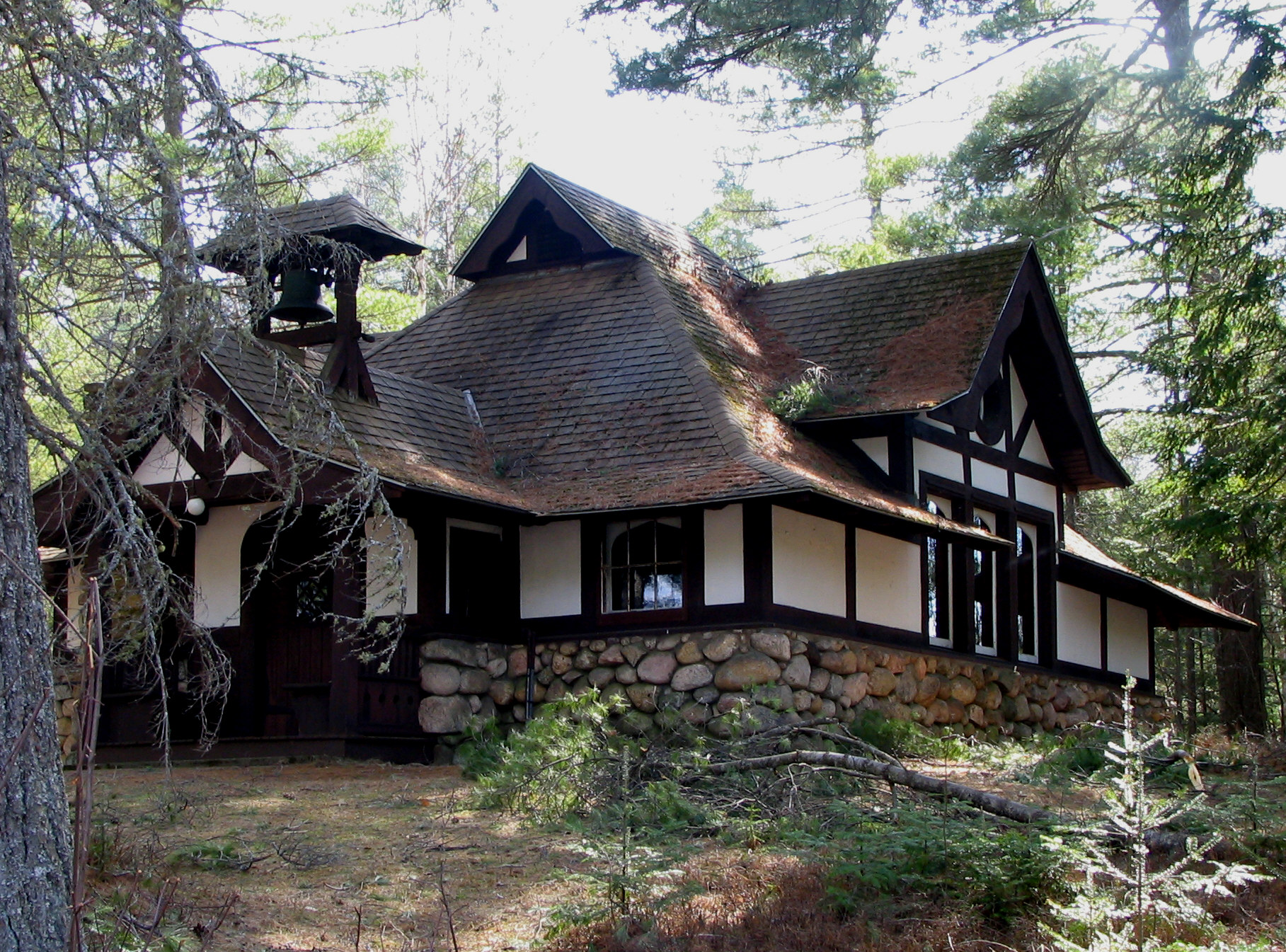
Saint Regis Presbyterian Church, designed by William L. Coulter

Keese Mill—better known locally as Keese's Mills, but also spelled as Keeses Mill and Keeses Mills—is a hamlet west of Paul Smiths in the Town of Brighton, Franklin County, New York, United States, in the Adirondacks. It is named for a settlement established by employees of the two sawmills established by Keese and Tomlinson near their dam on the outlet of Lower St. Regis Lake Saint Regis River in mid-nineteenth century.

Keese Mill road, which starts at Paul Smiths, is the only road in the hamlet; it provides access to Black Pond and Long Pond, trails to Saint Regis and Jenkins Mountains and the Saint Regis Esker Trail, and the middle branch of the Saint Regis River. At present, before reaching its end, it transitions to an unpaved dirt road, and at its end, it becomes the Blue Mountain Road and continues onward to NYS Route 458. The middle section is a seasonal road closed to traffic during the winter season.

== History ==
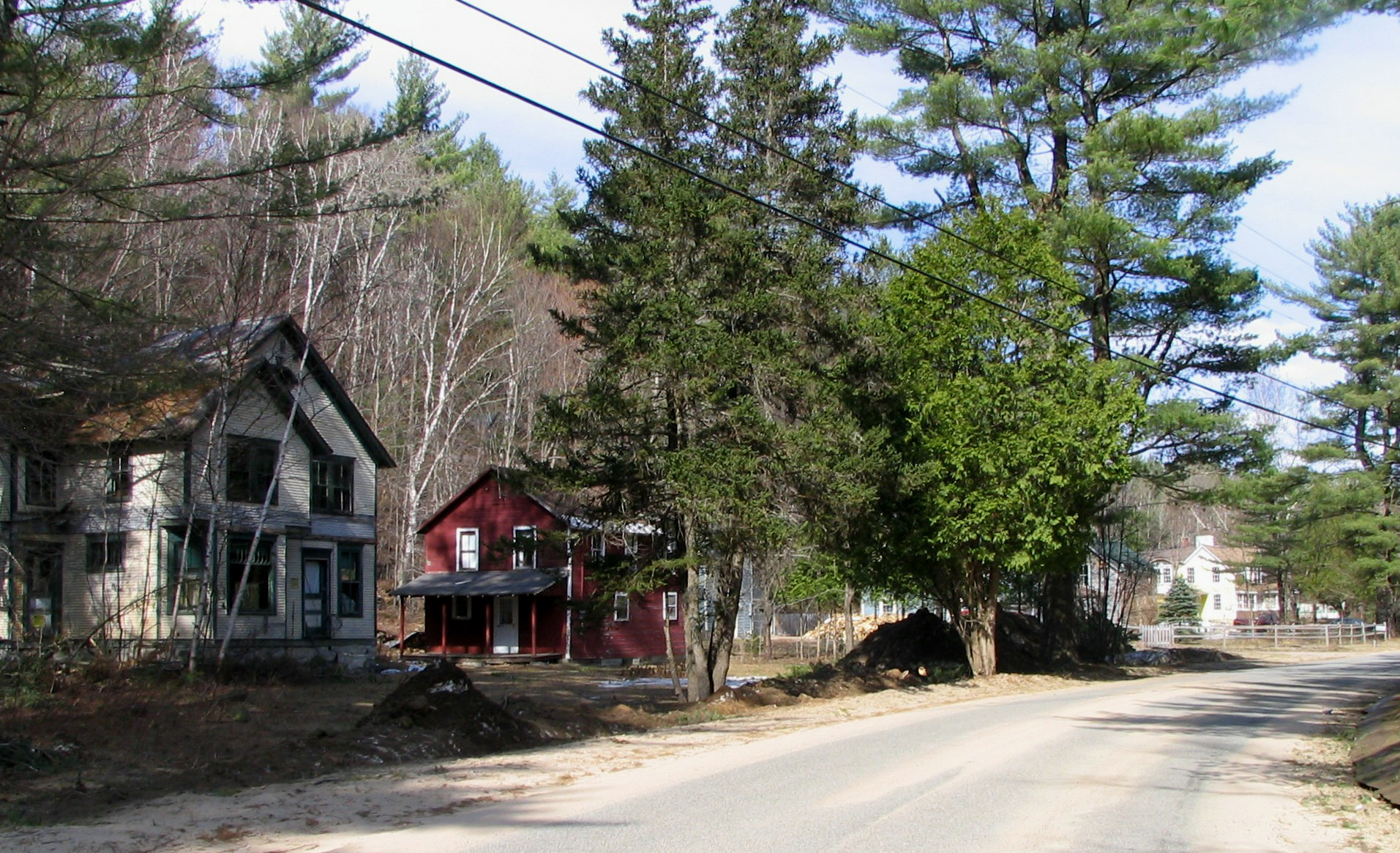
Keese Mill Road, the hamlet of Otisville

Oliver Keese and Thomas A. Tomlinson, lumbermen and mill operators from Keeseville, New York, built a sawmill there in 1851, which became the center of a small community. In 1923 Marjorie Merriweather Post built Camp Topridge, a Great Camp on the esker between the nearby Spectacle Ponds and Upper Saint Regis Lake. It was listed on the National Register of Historic Places in 1986.
