= Malone Freight Depot =

- U.S. National Register of Historic Places
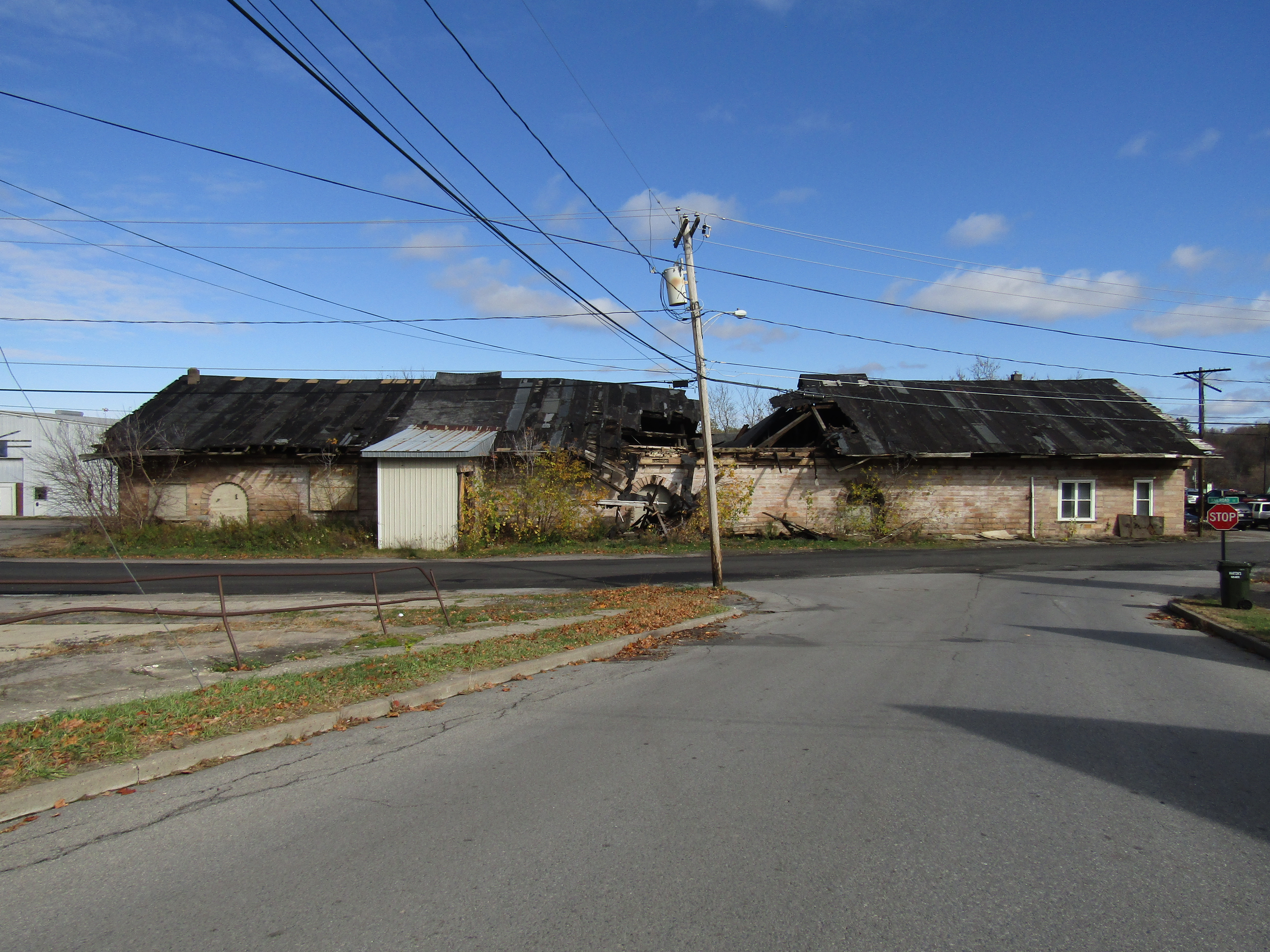

- Location within New York Location within the United States
- Location: 19 Railroad Street, Malone, New York
- Coordinates: 44°51′1″N 74°17′50″W
- Area: less than one acre
- Built: c. 1852
- Built by: Northern Railroad
- NRHP reference No.: 76001217
- Added to NRHP: December 12, 1976

The Malone Freight Depot is a historic railroad freight depot located at Malone in Franklin County, New York. It was built about 1852 by the Northern Railroad, and is a one-story, rectangular sandstone building with a low-pitched gable roof. It measures approximately 40 feet by 120 feet.

It was listed on the National Register of Historic Places in 1976.

== See also ==
- National Register of Historic Places listings in Franklin County, New York
