= North Country Community College =

Public college in Saranac Lake, NY

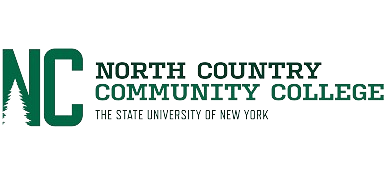
- Type: Public community college
- Established: 1967; 59 years ago
- Parent institution: State University of New York
- President: Joseph Keegan
- Undergraduates: 1,814 (fall 2025)
- Location: Saranac Lake, New York, United States; 44.319166°N 74.119563°W
- Campus: Rural 100 acres (0.40 km^{2})
- Colors: White and hunter green
- Nickname: Saints
- Sporting affiliations: National Junior College Athletic Association, Region III, Mountain Valley Athletic Conference
- Mascot: Saint Bernard
- Website: www.nccc.edu

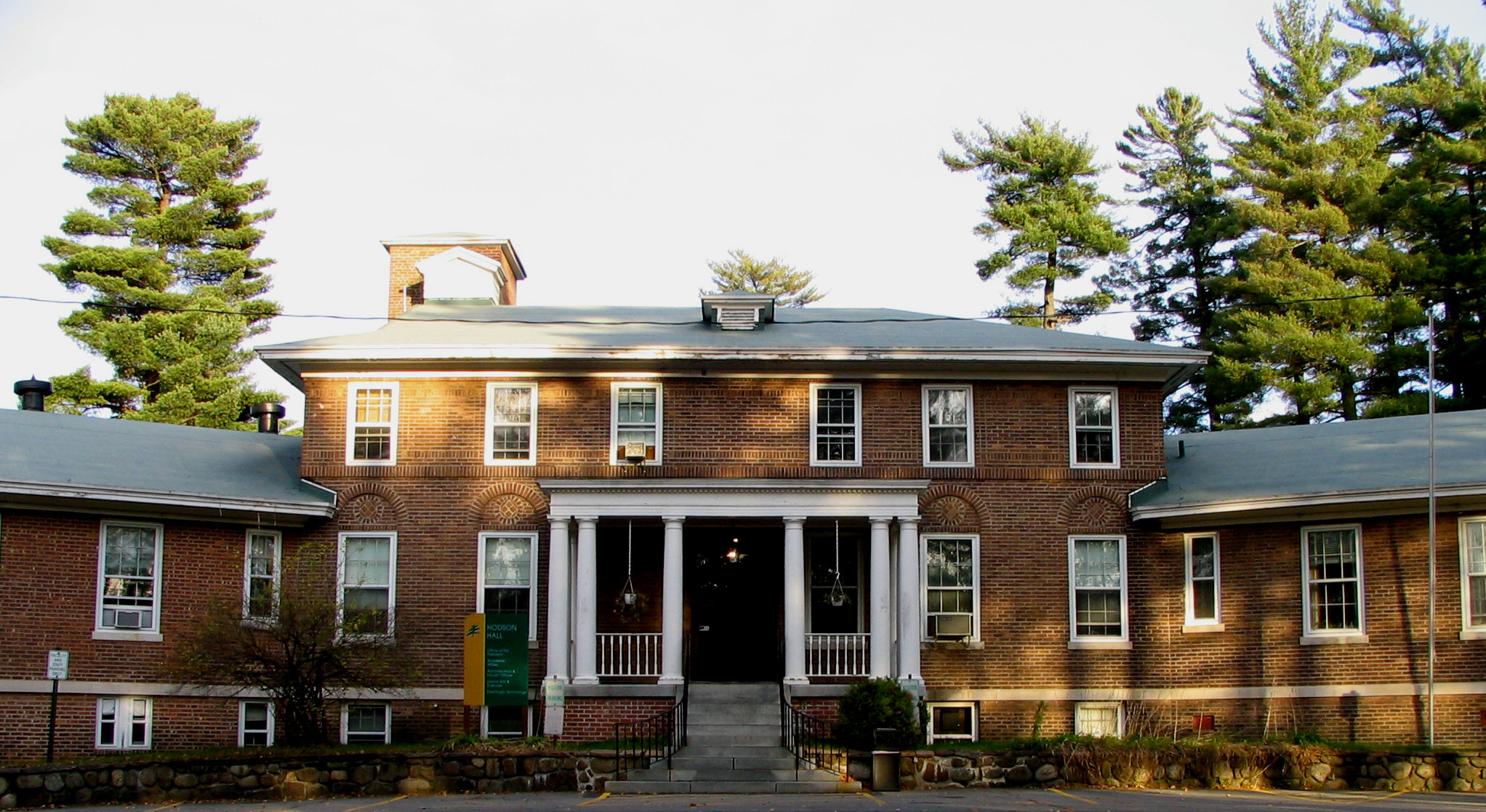
Hodson Hall

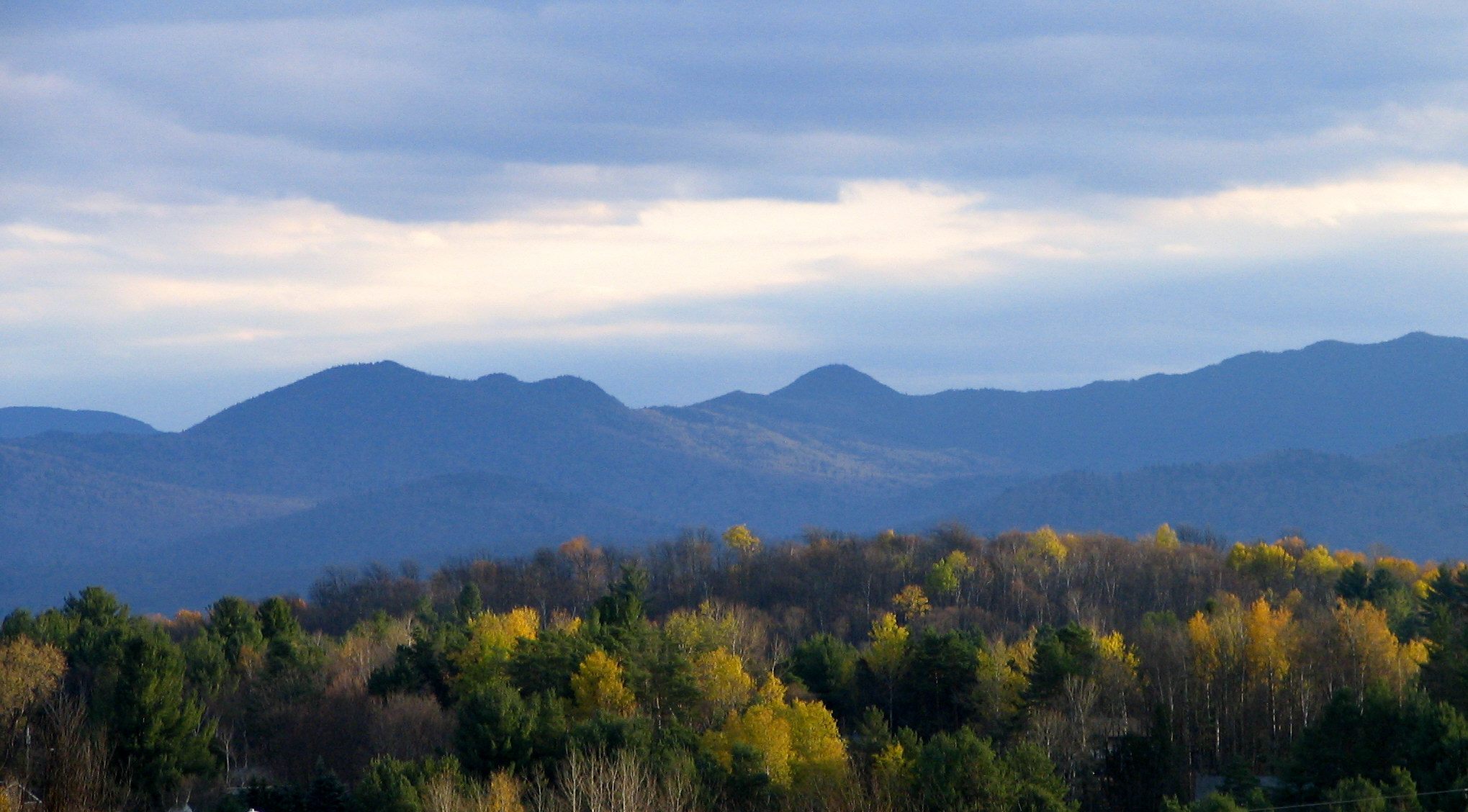
View of the Adirondack High Peaks from the campus

North Country Community College is a public community college in Saranac Lake, New York. It is part of the State University of New York system. Founded in 1967, the college's main campus is located in Saranac Lake, New York, and it has additional locations in Malone and Ticonderoga. It is sponsored by Franklin and Essex counties. In fall 2025, the college enrolled 824 students in associate degree programs, 92 students in certificate programs, and 898 students not enrolled in a specific program.

== Academics ==
The college provides 28 degree and certificate programs, including the Associate of Arts, Associate of Science, and Associate of Applied Science degrees.

=== Transfer paths ===
The college has numerous transfer paths within the State University of New York, as well as articulation agreements and transfer options to other four-year colleges and universities. In 2020, the college announced six new transfer pathways to allow NCCC graduates to earn bachelor's degrees from SUNY Empire in as little as one year after completing an associate degree.

== Athletics ==
College athletics are offered on the Saranac Lake campus and include men's and women's basketball, and men's and women's soccer. These sports are based at the Sparks Athletic Complex, which includes a gymnasium, pool, fitness center and team locker rooms.

North Country athletics has won over 10 NJCAA National Championships in a variety of sports. In 2019 and 2020, the college's women's basketball team won the NJCAA Region III championship and advanced to the national tournament both years.

== Student life ==
North Country offers a wide array of student activities on all three campuses: student group activities, student government, volunteer opportunities, career exploration, transfer planning, leadership development and health lifestyles. Many of the college's activities are centered around its location in the Adirondack Park. Hundreds of miles of hiking trails, lakes, and streams provide excellent opportunity for outdoor recreation nearby. The college's main campus is located near Lake Placid, Whiteface Mountain, located in Wilmington and the Olympic Center and Ski Jumps and Bobsled Track.
