= Trout River, New York =

Hamlet in New York, United States

Coordinates: 44°59′29.16″N 74°18′29.70″W

Trout River is a hamlet in Franklin County, New York, United States, located very close to the New York/Quebec border. Its neighboring communities are Trout River, Quebec, to the north; Constable, to the south; and Westville, to the west. It is located at the corner of highway 30 and highway 20. To the south of the hamlet lies Trout River State Forest. Trout River is one of the Customs and Border Protection's (CBPs) new recruits' first offered location.

March 8, 1975, Hee Haw saluted Trout River, New York, population 150.

The Trout River Border Crossing was listed on the National Register of Historic Places in 2014 as the U.S. Inspection Station–Trout River, New York.
