= Malone Armory =

- U.S. National Register of Historic Places
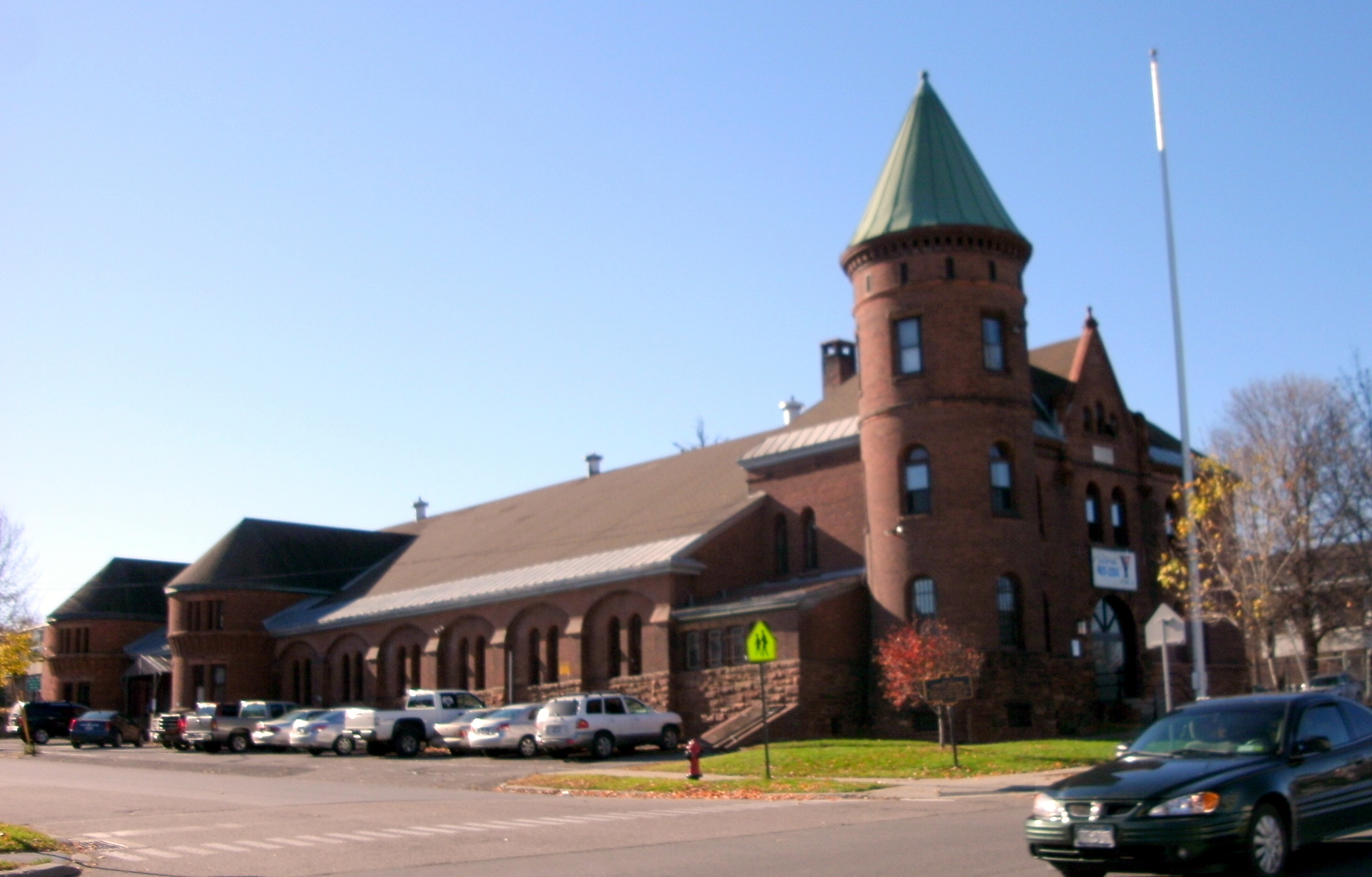
- Malone Armory, November 2010

- Location within New York Location within the United States
- Location: 116 W. Main St., Malone, New York
- Coordinates: 44°50′54″N 74°17′54″W
- Area: 0.8 acres (0.32 ha)
- Built: 1892
- Architect: Perry, Isaac
- MPS: Army National Guard Armories in New York State MPS
- NRHP reference No.: 95000089
- Added to NRHP: March 2, 1995

Malone Armory is a historic National Guard armory building located at Malone in Franklin County, New York. It is a brick and stone castle-like structure built in 1892, designed to be reminiscent of medieval military structures in Europe. It was designed by State Architect Isaac G. Perry. It consists of a 2-story, steeply pitched hipped roofed administration building with an attached 1 1/2-story, gable-roofed drill shed. The building is built of Potsdam sandstone and features a 3 1/2-story round tower on the administration building.

It was listed on the National Register of Historic Places in 1995.

== Gallery ==
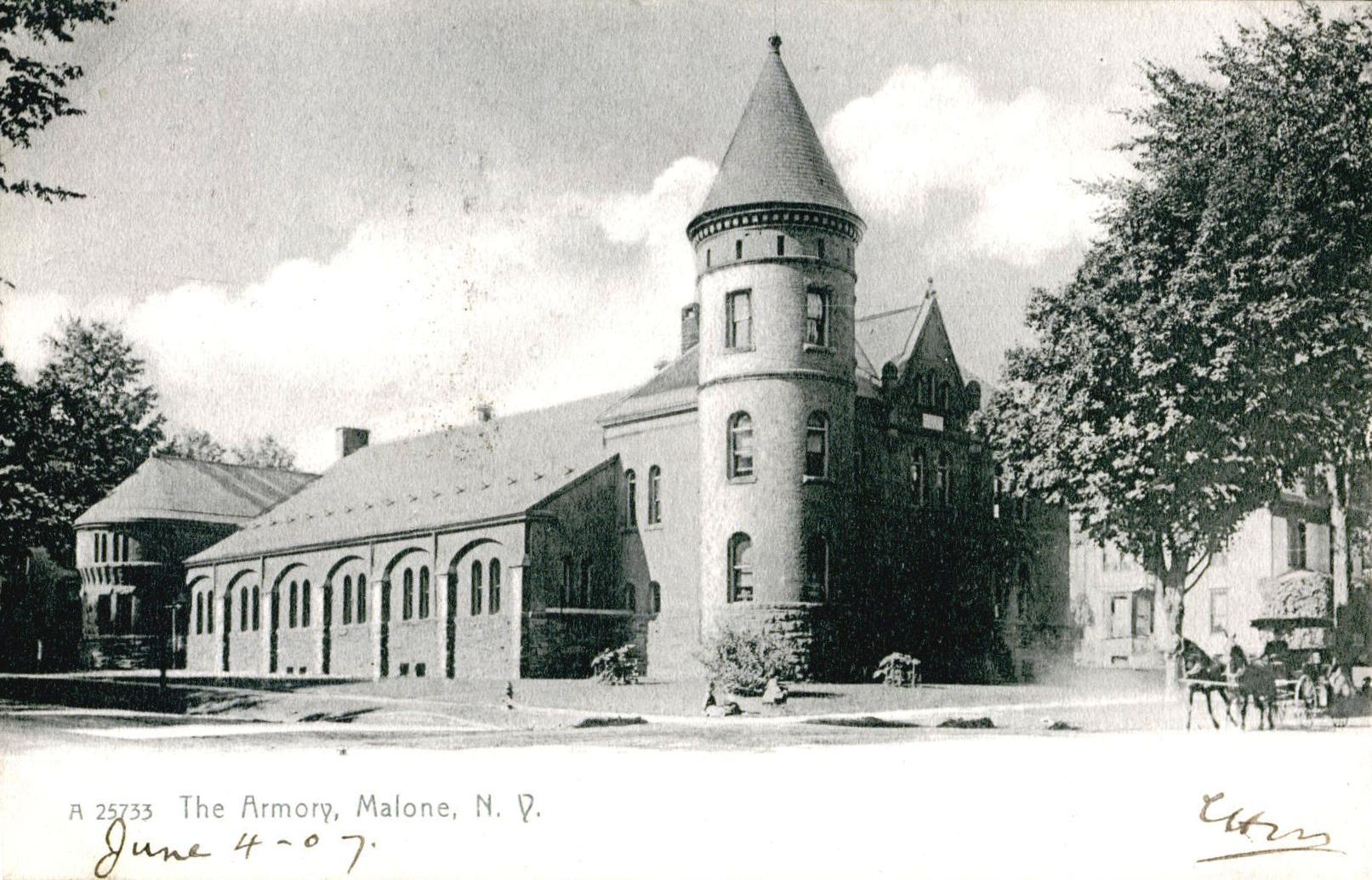
Malone Armory, 1907 Postcard
