= Malone (town), New York =

Malone, New York
- Town
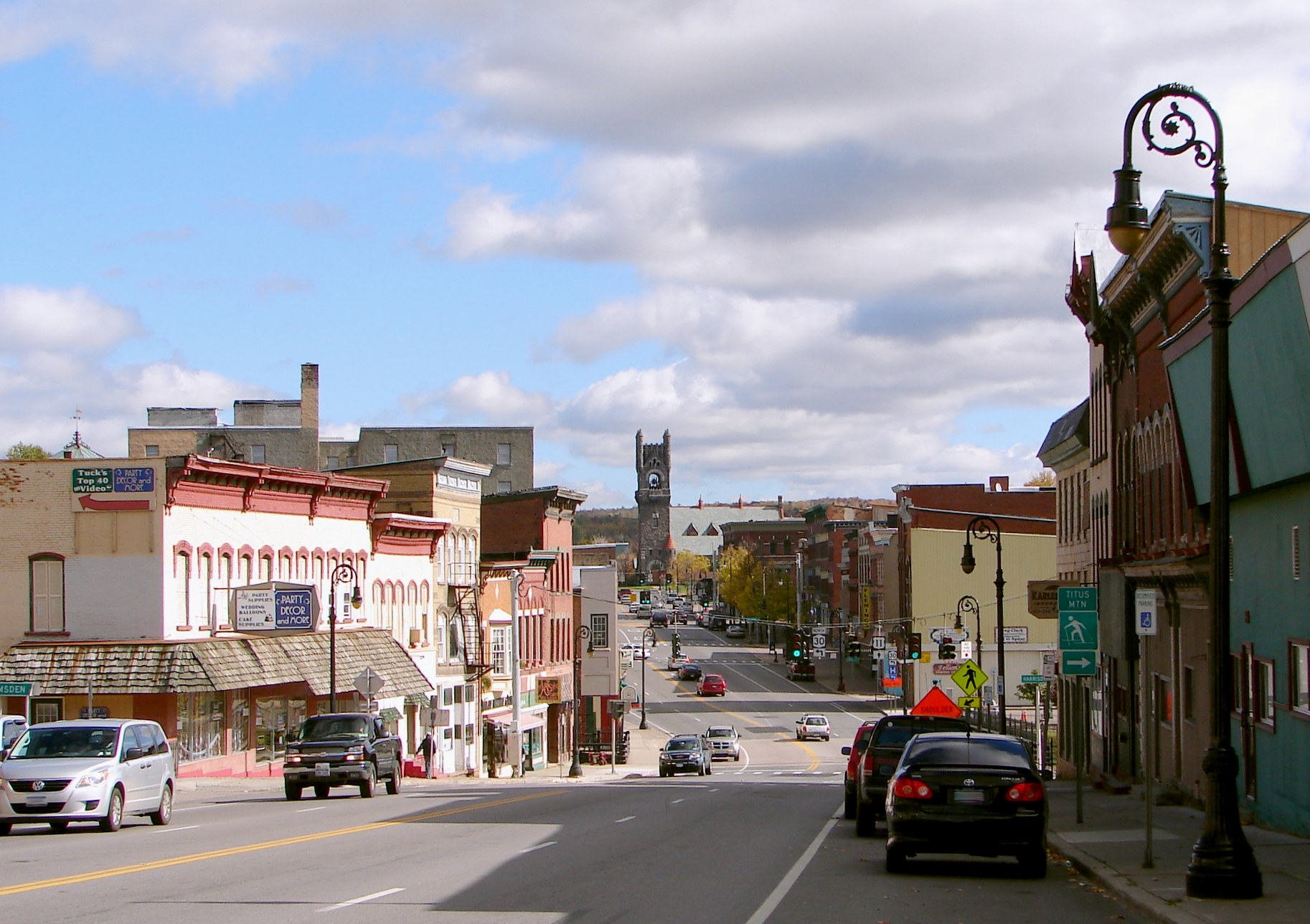

- Location within New York Location within the United States
- Coordinates: 44°50′56″N 074°17′29″W
- Country: United States
- State: New York
- Counties: Franklin

Government
  - Type: Town Council
  - Town Supervisor: Terrance Maguire (R)
  - Town Council: Members' List: • Louise Taylor (R); • Paul Walbridge (D); • John Sullivan (D); • Mary E. Scharf (D)

Area
  - Total: 102.80 sq mi (266.26 km^{2})
  - Land: 101.52 sq mi (262.94 km^{2})
  - Water: 1.28 sq mi (3.32 km^{2})
- Elevation: 790 ft (240 m)

Population (2020)
  - Total: 5,400
  - Density: 138.8/sq mi (53.59/km^{2})
- Time zone: UTC−5 (Eastern (EST))
  - Summer (DST): UTC−4 (EDT)
- ZIP Codes: 12953 (Malone); 12966 (North Bangor); 12995 (Whippleville)
- Area code: 518
- FIPS code: 36-033-44721
- GNIS feature ID: 979185
- Website: www.malonetown.com

Malone is a town in Franklin County, New York, United States. The population was 12,433 at the 2020 census. The town contains a village also named Malone. The town is an interior town located in the north-central part of the county.

== History ==
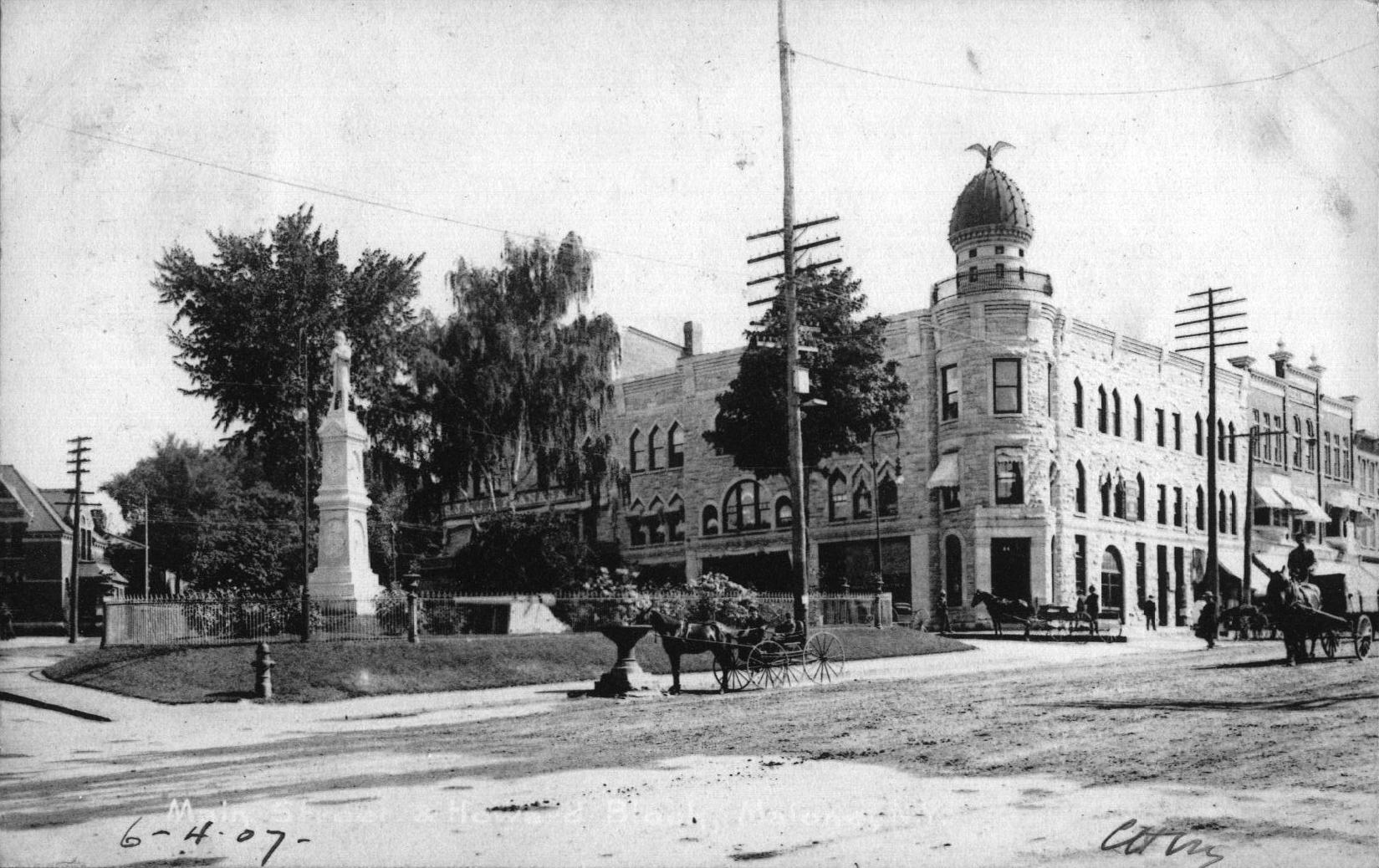
Main Street, Malone, 1907

The town was formed from part of the town of Chateaugay in 1805. The town was originally named "Harison", after Richard Harison, who had purchased the land and founded the town. The name was changed in 1808 to "Ezraville", after Ezra L'Hommedieu, and in 1812 to "Malone".

During the War of 1812, the village was sacked by British troops making incursions from what would become Canada.

Former Governor Mario Cuomo instituted financial measures to increase economic stability to the county by bringing in many prisons (state and federal).

Between 1901 and 1958, a commuter train service run by the New York Central Railroad connected Malone with Montreal, Quebec.

== Geography ==
Perspective map of Malone from 1886 with list of landmarks by L.R. Burleigh

According to the United States Census Bureau, the town has a total area of 102.8 square miles (266.3 km^{2}), of which 101.5 square miles (262.9 km^{2}) is land and 1.3 square miles (3.3 km^{2}), or 1.25%, is water.

U.S. Route 11 and New York State Route 11B are east–west highways across the town, and New York State Route 30 and New York State Route 37 are north–south highways.

The Salmon River flows northward through the center of town, and the Trout River flows across the northeastern corner.

=== Communities and locations in the Town of Malone ===
- Bare Hill Correctional Facility – a New York state medium security state prison
- Chasm Falls – a hamlet in the southeastern part of the town on County Road 25; originally called Titusville
- Fay – a hamlet by the northern town line
- Flanagan Hotel – built in 1917
- Franklin Correctional Facility – a New York state medium security state prison
- Lake Titus – a lake in the southwestern part of the town
- Malone – a village located in the center of the town and the county seat of Franklin County
- Malone-Dufort Airport (MAL) – an airport west of the village of Malone
- Malone Junction – a hamlet northeast of the village of Malone
- Teboville – a hamlet in the central part of the town, east of Whippleville
- Titus Mountain – a ski area spread over three mountains, 7 miles (11 km) south of the village of Malone
- Upstate Correctional Facility – a New York state maximum security state prison
- Whippleville – a hamlet in the central part of the town, located south of the village of Malone on County Road 25

=== Climate ===
According to the Köppen Climate Classification system, Malone has a warm-summer humid continental climate, abbreviated "Dfb" on climate maps. The hottest temperature recorded in Malone was 95 °F (35.0 °C) on July 10, 2020, while the coldest temperature recorded was −31 °F (−35.0 °C) on February 7, 1993.

Climate data for Malone, New York, 1991–2020 normals, extremes 1983–present
Month	Jan	Feb	Mar	Apr	May	Jun	Jul	Aug	Sep	Oct	Nov	Dec	Year
Record high °F (°C)	65 (18)	66 (19)	78 (26)	87 (31)	94 (34)	93 (34)	95 (35)	94 (34)	90 (32)	88 (31)	76 (24)	67 (19)	95 (35)
Mean maximum °F (°C)	51.9 (11.1)	48.0 (8.9)	59.2 (15.1)	76.1 (24.5)	82.4 (28.0)	86.8 (30.4)	87.3 (30.7)	86.6 (30.3)	83.9 (28.8)	75.5 (24.2)	66.0 (18.9)	55.1 (12.8)	89.2 (31.8)
Mean daily maximum °F (°C)	24.1 (−4.4)	26.5 (−3.1)	35.3 (1.8)	50.4 (10.2)	64.4 (18.0)	72.6 (22.6)	77.0 (25.0)	75.4 (24.1)	68.7 (20.4)	55.1 (12.8)	42.6 (5.9)	30.8 (−0.7)	51.9 (11.0)
Daily mean °F (°C)	14.9 (−9.5)	16.8 (−8.4)	26.2 (−3.2)	40.7 (4.8)	54.3 (12.4)	63.3 (17.4)	67.8 (19.9)	65.8 (18.8)	58.5 (14.7)	46.4 (8.0)	34.8 (1.6)	22.9 (−5.1)	42.7 (6.0)
Mean daily minimum °F (°C)	5.7 (−14.6)	7.2 (−13.8)	17.2 (−8.2)	31.1 (−0.5)	44.3 (6.8)	54.1 (12.3)	58.7 (14.8)	56.2 (13.4)	48.2 (9.0)	37.7 (3.2)	27.0 (−2.8)	15.1 (−9.4)	33.5 (0.9)
Mean minimum °F (°C)	−18.3 (−27.9)	−13.7 (−25.4)	−5.3 (−20.7)	17.6 (−8.0)	30.0 (−1.1)	40.5 (4.7)	47.4 (8.6)	44.0 (6.7)	34.0 (1.1)	24.5 (−4.2)	9.2 (−12.7)	−9.1 (−22.8)	−20.3 (−29.1)
Record low °F (°C)	−30 (−34)	−31 (−35)	−21 (−29)	5 (−15)	24 (−4)	30 (−1)	40 (4)	38 (3)	26 (−3)	19 (−7)	−5 (−21)	−29 (−34)	−31 (−35)
Average precipitation inches (mm)	2.42 (61)	1.98 (50)	2.37 (60)	3.31 (84)	3.33 (85)	4.50 (114)	3.97 (101)	3.85 (98)	4.04 (103)	4.30 (109)	3.11 (79)	2.74 (70)	39.92 (1,014)
Average snowfall inches (cm)	22.7 (58)	20.2 (51)	17.0 (43)	7.1 (18)	0.3 (0.76)	0.0 (0.0)	0.0 (0.0)	0.0 (0.0)	0.0 (0.0)	1.4 (3.6)	8.8 (22)	20.6 (52)	98.1 (248.36)
Average extreme snow depth inches (cm)	13.4 (34)	14.9 (38)	15.7 (40)	6.3 (16)	0.2 (0.51)	0.0 (0.0)	0.0 (0.0)	0.0 (0.0)	0.0 (0.0)	1.0 (2.5)	4.7 (12)	9.6 (24)	20.1 (51)
Average precipitation days (≥ 0.01 in)	16.9	13.8	13.1	13.5	13.9	14.6	13.1	12.1	12.0	14.4	14.7	17.0	169.1
Average snowy days (≥ 0.1 in)	13.8	11.5	8.2	3.5	0.2	0.0	0.0	0.0	0.0	0.8	5.3	11.3	54.6
Source 1: NOAA
Source 2: National Weather Service

== Demographics ==
Historical population
Census	Pop.	Note	%±
1820	1,150		—
1830	2,207		91.9%
1840	3,229		46.3%
1850	4,550		40.9%
1860	6,565		44.3%
1870	7,186		9.5%
1880	7,909		10.1%
1890	8,991		13.7%
1900	10,009		11.3%
1910	10,154		1.4%
1920	10,830		6.7%
1930	11,798		8.9%
1940	11,987		1.6%
1950	12,644		5.5%
1960	11,997		−5.1%
1970	11,400		−5.0%
1980	11,276		−1.1%
1990	12,982		15.1%
2000	14,981		15.4%
2010	14,545		−2.9%
2020	12,433		−14.5%
U.S. Decennial Census

At the 2000 census there were 14,981 people, 4,114 households, and 2,620 families in the town. The population density was 147.1 inhabitants per square mile (56.8/km^{2}). There were 4,644 housing units at an average density of 45.6 per square mile (17.6/km^{2}). The ethnic makeup of the town was 73.61% White, 18.56% Black or African American, 0.49% Native American, 0.63% Asian, 6.25% from other races, and 0.45% from two or more races. Hispanic or Latino of any race were 11.19%. Malone, New York has a far more diverse demographic profile compared to the surrounding region, due to hosting multiple state correctional facilities, which house prisoners from the entirety of New York state. Malone also hosts the county correctional facility for Franklin County.

Of the 4,114 households 30.2% had children under the age of 18 living with them, 46.5% were married couples living together, 12.7% had a female householder with no husband present, and 36.3% were non-families. 30.7% of households were one person and 14.3% were one person aged 65 or older. The average household size was 2.36 and the average family size was 2.91.

The age distribution was 16.3% under the age of 18, 10.4% from 18 to 24, 42.1% from 25 to 44, 19.2% from 45 to 64, and 12.1% 65 or older. The median age was 36 years. For every 100 females, there were 179.4 males. For every 100 females age 18 and over, there were 201.5 males.

The median household income was $27,716 and the median family income was $37,500. Males had a median income of $25,996 versus $20,506 for females. The per capita income for the town was $17,352.

According to the Census 2017 ACS 5Year Estimates, the poverty rate in Malone is 24%. The child poverty rate is 31%. (A previous statistic here said the poverty rate was only 8%).

== Sports ==
The Malone Border Hounds began play at American Legion Field with the Empire Professional Baseball League in 2023 and they won the league championship in their first season.

== Notable people ==
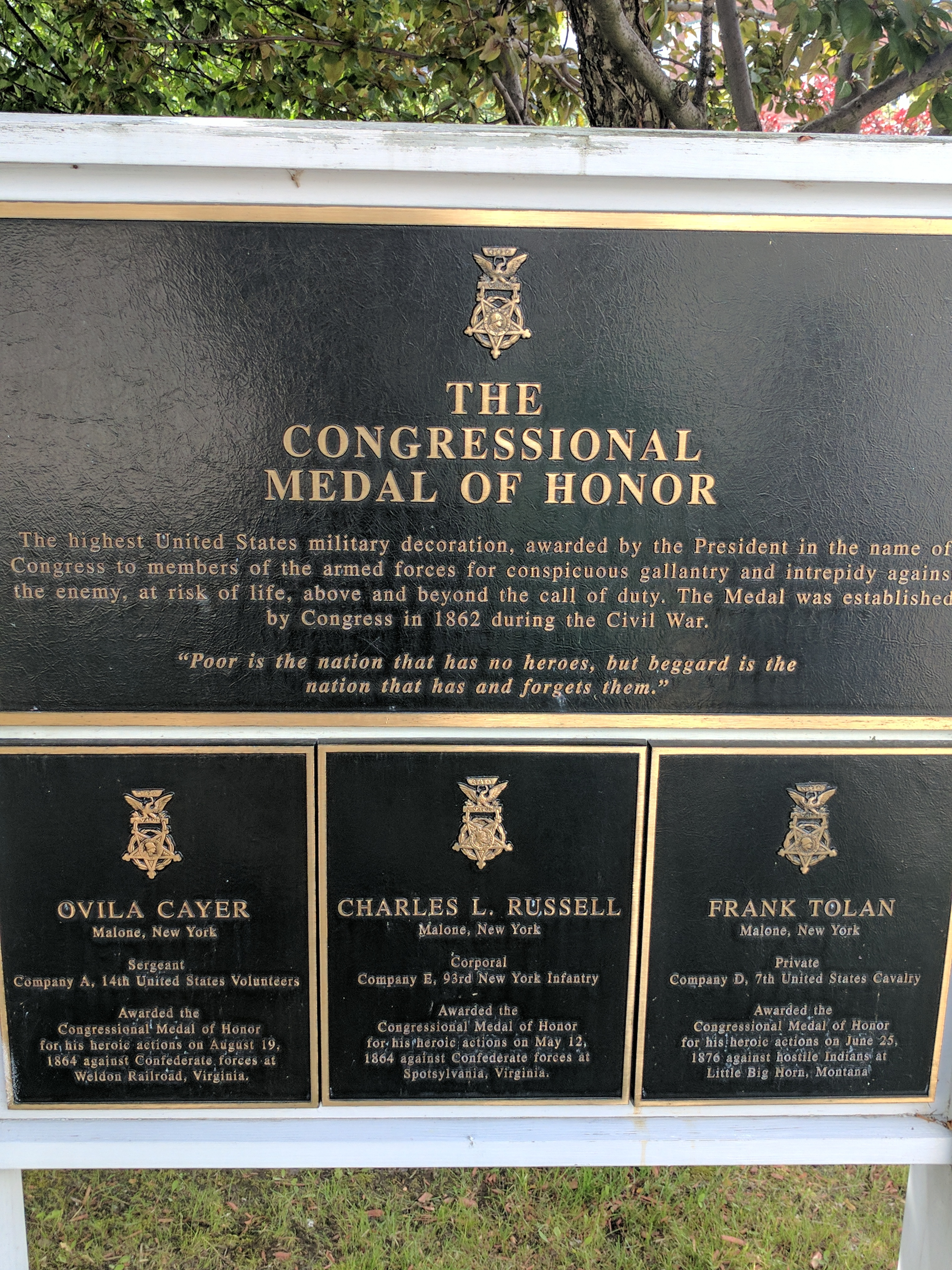
Three recipients of the Medal of Honor resided in Malone

- Tom Browning (1960–2022), MLB pitcher who won the World Series with the Cincinnati Reds
- Ovila Cayer (1844–1909), recipient of the Medal of Honor for actions during the Battle of Globe Tavern
- Alexander Duane (1858–1926), ophthalmologist
- Orville Gibson (1856–1911), founder of Gibson Guitar Corporation
- William H. Flack (1861–1907), US congressman
- Michael Hastings (1980–2013), investigative journalist
- William H. Huntington (1848–1916), former Wisconsin State Assemblyman
- Clarence E. Kilburn (1893–1975), Republican member of the United States House of Representatives
- Bob Mould (born 1960), solo musician and former guitarist, singer, and songwriter with alternative rock bands Hüsker Dü and Sugar
- Charles L. Russell (1844–1910), recipient of the Medal of Honor for actions during the Battle of Spotsylvania Court House
- John Henry Slattery (died 1933), Colorado politician
- Frank Tolan (1854–99), recipient of the Medal of Honor for actions at the Battle of the Little Bighorn
- William A. Wheeler (1819–87), the 19th Vice President of the United States. Buried at Morningside Cemetery in Malone, his mansion on Elm Street is now the site of the Elks Lodge
- Almanzo Wilder (1857–1949), husband of Little House on the Prairie author Laura Ingalls Wilder
- Philip Woolley (1831–1912), Canadian American businessman
