= Black Hills National Cemetery =

Veterans cemetery in Meade County, South Dakota

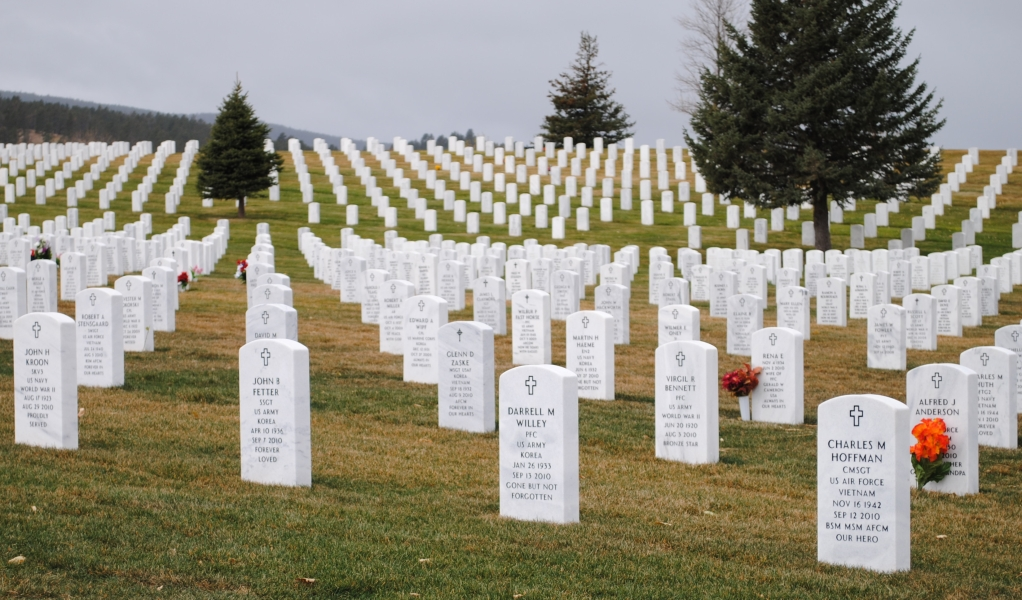
- Headstones in the Black Hills National Cemetery
- Interactive map of Black Hills National Cemetery

Details
- Established: October 3, 1948; 77 years ago
- Location: Sturgis, South Dakota
- Country: United States
- Coordinates: 44°22′08″N 103°28′33″W
- Type: Public, national
- Owned by: United States Department of Veterans Affairs
- Size: 105.9 acres (42.9 ha)
- No. of graves: 23,000+ (Note: The number of graves and interments are not the same, as multiple family members may be interred in the same grave.)
- No. of interments: 29,000+
- Website: Black Hills Nat'l Cemetery
- Find a Grave: Black Hills National Cemetery
- Black Hills National Cemetery
- U.S. National Register of Historic Places
- U.S. Historic district
- NRHP reference No.: 16000258
- Added to NRHP: May 17, 2016

Black Hills National Cemetery, originally named Fort Meade National Cemetery, is a United States National Cemetery near Sturgis, South Dakota. Named after the nearby Black Hills, over 29,000 interments of military veterans and their family members have taken place since its founding in 1948. It is administered by the U.S. Department of Veterans Affairs (VA), which also operates the nearby Fort Meade National Cemetery. It was the first national cemetery in South Dakota and is currently the only one open to new burials.

Prominent features of the cemetery include its committal shelter, where memorial services and events are held, and the Avenue of Flags leading up to it. Although primarily hosting lawn graves, three columbaria were built in 2010, which allow the interment of ashes. Several memorial structures have been placed on the grounds since its inception, including one each for veterans of the Korean War and the Vietnam War. Multiple notable people are buried in the cemetery.

== History ==
=== Establishment ===
The cemetery was established from land that once formed part of Fort Meade. When the fort officially closed as a military installation in 1944, most of its surrounding land was divided among various local interests. This closure coincided with a renewed need by the Department of the Army for military burial space following World War II and an aging veteran population from World War I and other previous conflicts. The Department of the Army took notice that the closest military cemetery for Black Hills veterans was at Fort Snelling National Cemetery in Minnesota, several hundred miles away. In July 1947, Chief of the Memorial Division of the Quartermaster Corps George Horkan was placed in charge of surveying the Fort Meade area for a potential new cemetery site.

Although Fort Meade had its own cemetery dating back to the 19th century, a number of factors prevented the VA from repurposing it. Firstly, it was deemed too small in size; originally, the VA considered moving the existing bodies to Fort Snelling to make room for new burials, but cancelled this plan after facing considerable pushback from local cities. The Fort Meade cemetery was also rather remote, and access roads were in poor condition. Finally, the bodies could not be moved without contacting next-of-kin, a task which would have proven impossible due to the age of many of the burials.

The search for a new plot continued until 1948, when 105.9 acres (42.9 ha) of land were chosen south of Sturgis for the new burial ground. This location was more favorable due to plentiful room for further expansion, as well as being easily accessible from Interstate 90. The land was transferred from public domain holdings, and the United States Department of the Army handled preparation of the grounds and construction of the first facilities. Original plans were drawn up by the U.S. Army Corps of Engineers. Groundbreaking occurred on June 6, 1948. Ernest Schanze, himself a World War II veteran who had worked in cemetery management before the war, was chosen as the first superintendent.

The first seven burials took place in private ceremonies held in September 1948, during the week leading up to the actual dedication of the cemetery. These were all service members killed in action during World War II, whose unclaimed remains had been in storage at the Kansas City Quartermaster Depot. The first four were Sergeant Carl Hasselstrom, Captain Charles Durfee, Technician Gerhard Biberdorf, and Staff Sergeant Harold Johnson, all interred on September 27; the last three, Private First Class Henry Brown, Lieutenant Clinton Derscheid, and Private First Class Charles Swimmer, were interred on September 30.

=== Naming ===
Originally, Horkan proposed the name Black Hills National Cemetery to avoid confusion with the nearby pre-existing burial ground, but paperwork filed in June 1948 named the new cemetery as the Fort Meade National Cemetery instead. Efforts soon began to rename the cemetery, backed by U.S. Senator Francis Case. On November 11 (Veterans Day), 1949, the new cemetery was renamed to Black Hills National Cemetery to avoid confusion with both the nearby site and Fort Meade in Maryland.

=== Dedication ===
On October 3, 1948, the cemetery was officially dedicated, marking the official opening of the state's first national cemetery. Between 2,500 and 3,000 people attended. Speeches were delivered by Case; Harry Johnson, vice commander of the Tenth Air Force; and South Dakota Governor George T. Mickelson. Mickelson quoted the Gettysburg Address, and Case's speech concluded, "For those who can sleep here, South Dakota showers will freshen the grass; South Dakota snows will blanket their graves in winter and South Dakota sun will warm them in spring."

The dedication ceremony concluded with a flyover by the South Dakota Air National Guard's 175th Fighter Squadron, which dropped flowers from the sky. A military parade ensued, led by units from local American Legion and Veterans of Foreign Wars posts, Ellsworth Air Force Base, and a nurse unit from the Fort Meade Veterans Association Hospital.

=== Later history and expansions ===
The original plot of developed land measured only 6 acres (2.4 ha) and consisted of Sections A–E. Land was periodically developed as needed for more graves. The first Memorial Day celebration was held on May 30, 1949. By the end of its first year, Black Hills National Cemetery had 91 total interments. By 1974, approximately 5,000 burials had taken place.

Several expansions and developments have taken place since the cemetery's establishment, with improvements beginning almost immediately after its opening. The Omaha district of the Corps of Engineers oversaw most of the early developments. In 1951, 229 trees and 1,200 shrubs were planted, metal gates and fencing were erected at the entrance, and the superintendent's home was built.

The search for a reliable underground water source to support more vegetation was given priority, although it took several years. Multiple failed drilling attempts by H. Hackett and Sons, Inc. and Layne Minnesota Co. were marred by cave-ins and lost equipment; one subcontracted drilling company went bankrupt as a result. William Hackett, president of Hackett and Sons, blamed the Corps of Engineers for the failures. The pump house was finally completed in 1955.

Initial plans included space for a chapel, but this apparently was never constructed. The Avenue of Flags was added in 1967 and expanded in 1975. The National Cemetery System, a branch of the VA, took over management of almost all national cemeteries in 1973, including the Black Hills National Cemetery. The administration building was constructed at that time, and the committal shelter soon followed in 1978, in the space once reserved for the chapel. In the 1990s, the superintendent's office was demolished and the administration building was expanded with new offices and restroom facilities.

In 2018, Kristi Noem sponsored the Black Hills Cemetery Act in Congress that approved a further expansion of the Black Hills National Cemetery. The following year, the VA obtained an additional 181.32 acres (73.38 ha) of land through the Black Hills National Cemetery Boundary Expansion Act, which was signed into law by President Donald Trump on May 25, 2018. This more than doubled the available space in the cemetery.

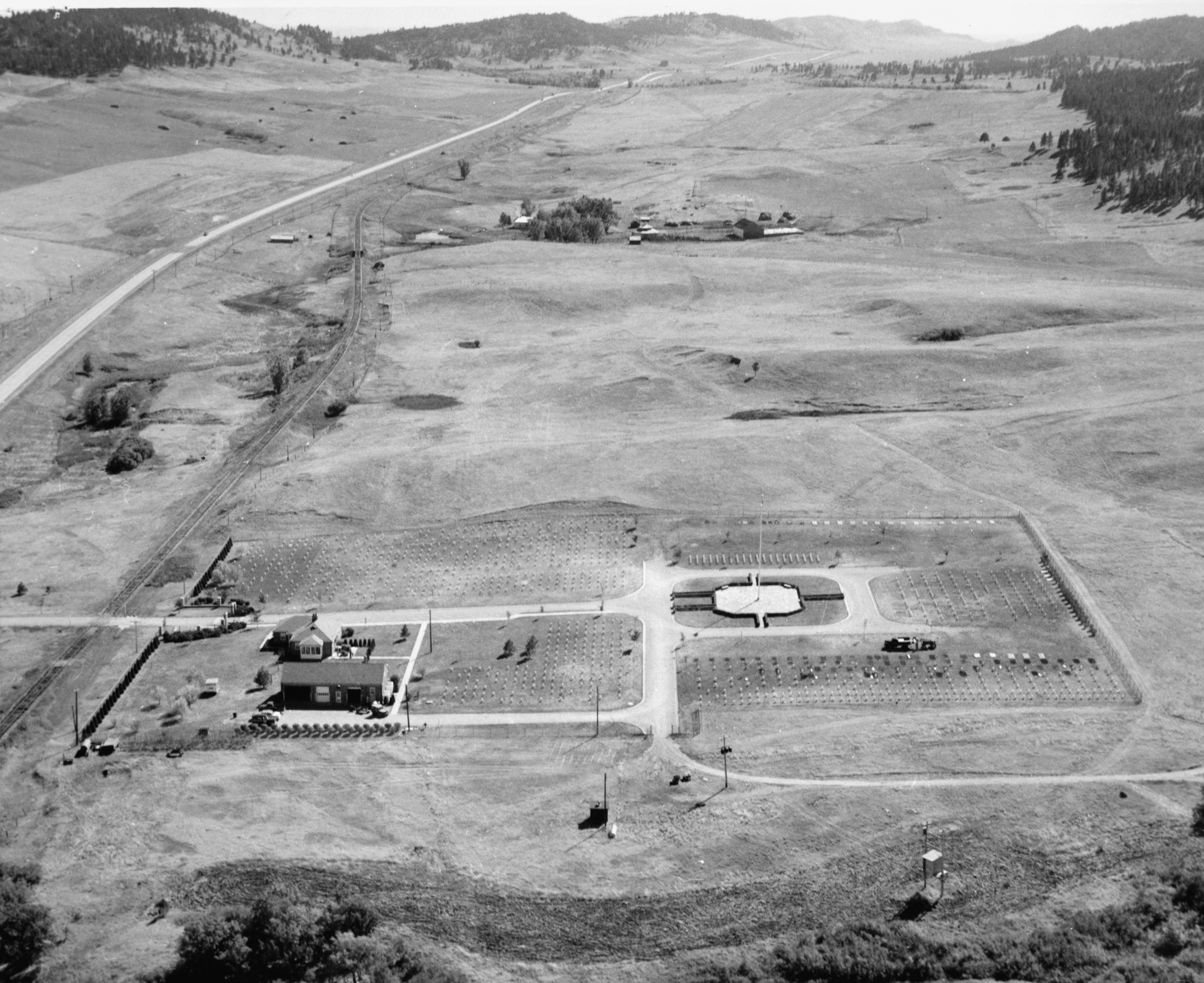
1959, looking south; aerial view showing only the entrance buildings and first sections completed

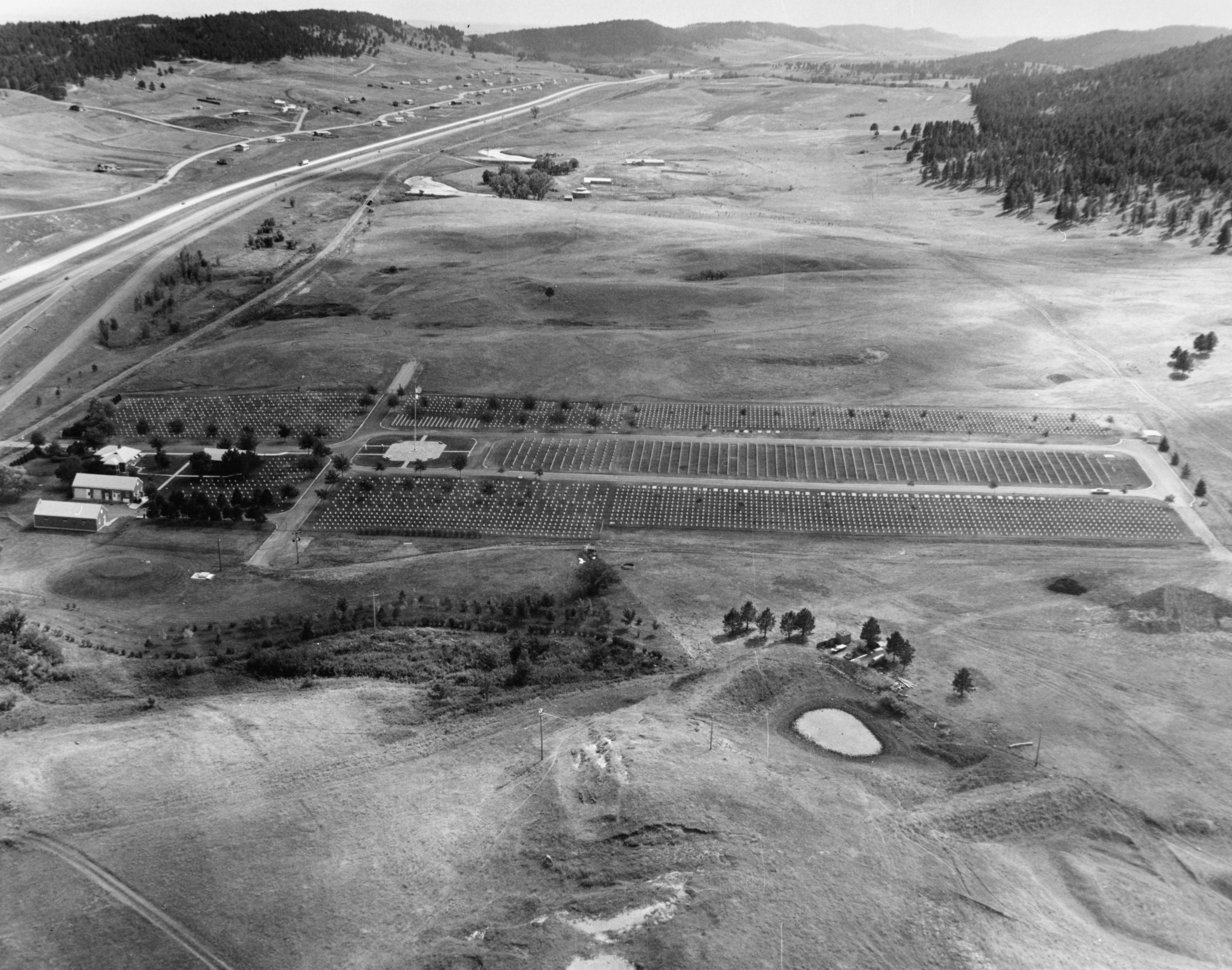
1976, looking south; by this time, the cemetery had expanded to the west

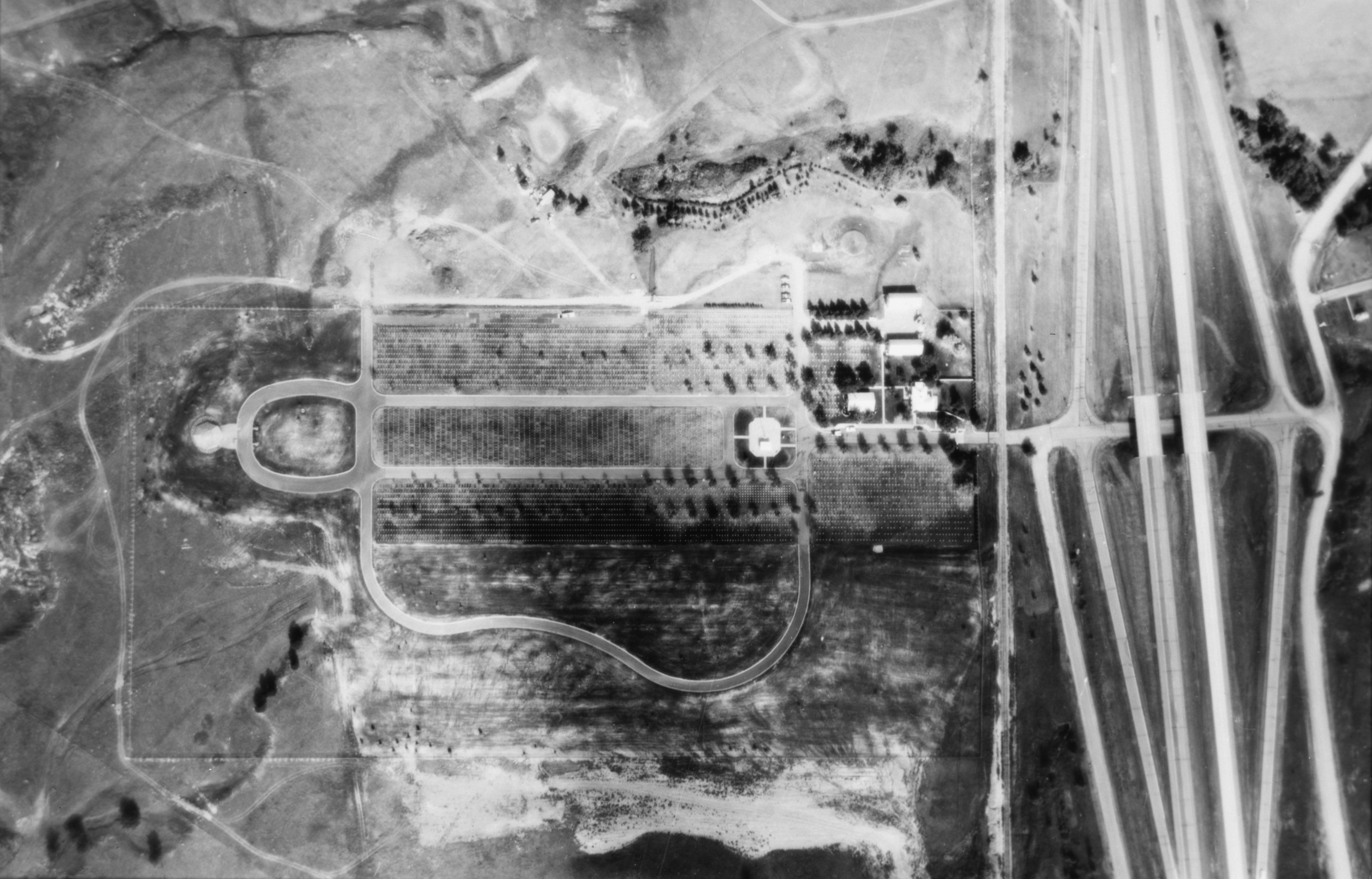
1978, north at top; the parking loop and committal shelter on the western edge were added

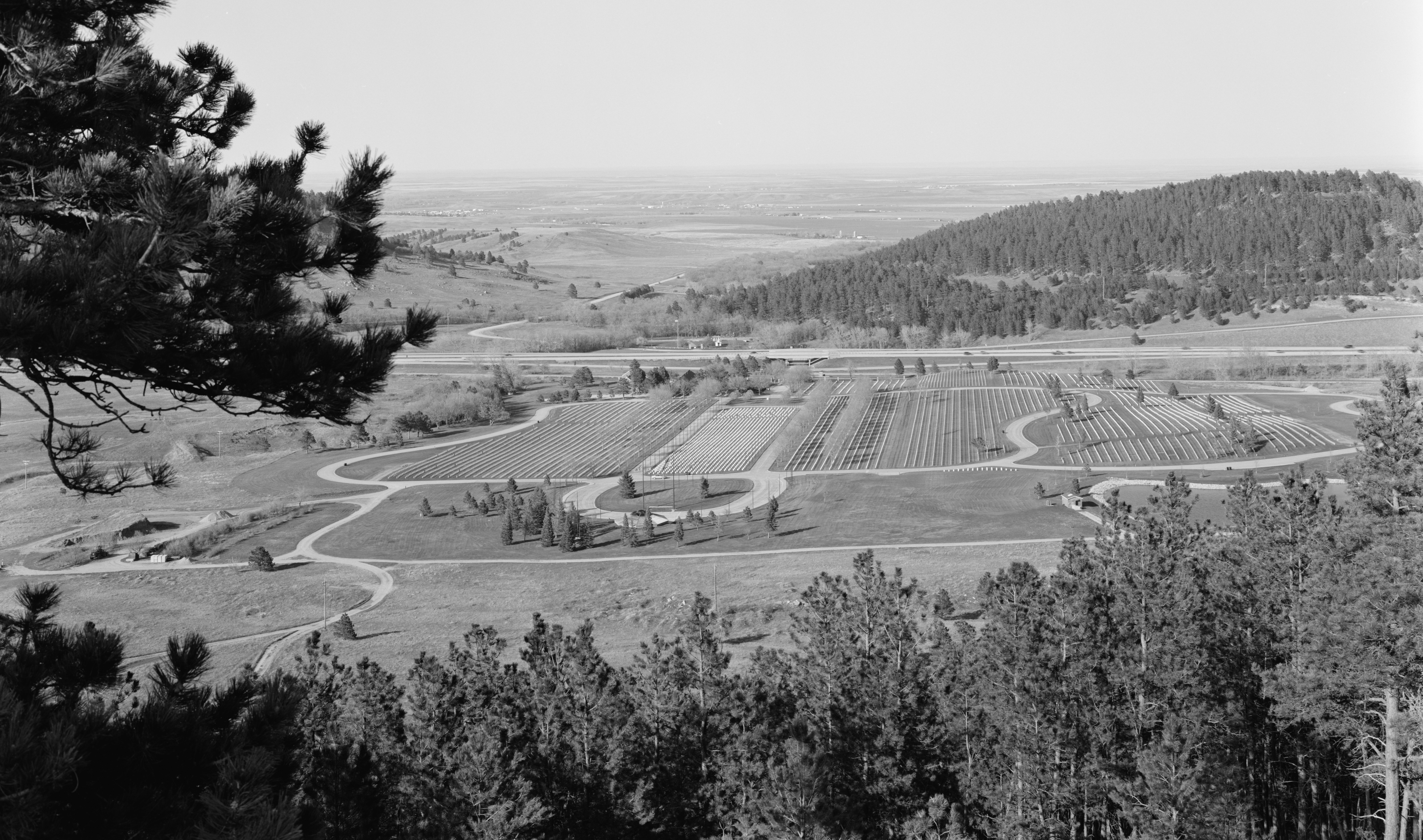
2006, looking east; the cemetery has expanded south and added loop roads

=== National Register of Historic Places ===
The entire cemetery (Note: Although claiming to encompass the entire cemetery, the National Register of Historic Places listing includes only 105.4 acres (42.7 ha), although the VA maintains the cemetery's total area is 105.9 acres (42.9 ha). The listing also precedes the 2019 expansion. As of 2024, the remaining acreage has not been added to the listing.) was listed on the National Register of Historic Places on May 17, 2016, under criterion A for historical importance. The 23 contributing properties included the administration building, two maintenance buildings, the committal shelter, a pump house, all three columbaria, the flagpoles on the Avenue of Flags, and all three memorials and plaques that had been installed by the time of listing.

== Description ==
The Black Hills National Cemetery is located off of exit 34 of Interstate 90, 3 miles (4.8 km) southeast of Sturgis in Meade County, South Dakota, in the foothills of the Black Hills. The original cemetery was only 6 acres (2.4 ha); this original plot included the administration building and the entrance plaza. The original area included 105.9 acres (42.9 ha) of land, which was expanded by 181.32 acres (73.38 ha) in 2019. The cemetery is open daily between sunrise and sunset.

As of 2019, over 29,000 interments have been made. About 650 interments take place annually. Those eligible for burial in the cemetery are veterans with a non-dishonorable discharge, active service members, their spouses, and dependent children.

As the other two national cemeteries in South Dakota, Fort Meade National Cemetery and Hot Springs National Cemetery, are closed to new burials, Black Hills National Cemetery is the only one currently accepting new interments.

=== Facilities ===
The 2,160-square-foot (201 m^{2}) administration building serves as the official and archival headquarters for the cemetery and doubles as the visitors center. It also has public restroom facilities. Completed in 1973, it is a simple, rectangular, red brick building with a concrete-tiled gable roof.

The committal shelter, dedicated on Memorial Day 1978, functions as a central events venue where services and tributes are held. It is a one-story octagonal round building, partially dug out into the hill behind it, and has a total floor area of about 2,200 square feet (200 m^{2}). Its octagonal roof has a matching cupola at its center, with eight skylights centered around a ninth.

Two maintenance buildings are positioned behind the administration. The oldest dates to 1949; in 1967, this one was renovated and the second building was added. Both buildings were further expanded and developed in 1995. Like the administration ward, both buildings are similar in construction: they are simple rectangular structures on concrete foundations, with gabled roofs and double-hung sash windows. Garage doors provide access for large maintenance vehicles. They have a combined total area of about 6,180 square feet (574 m^{2}).

Three stone columbaria were added in 2010. Each is rectangular and has five sections stepped-up against the adjacent hillside. Each niche is fronted with a marble panel containing the interment inscriptions.

=== Layout ===
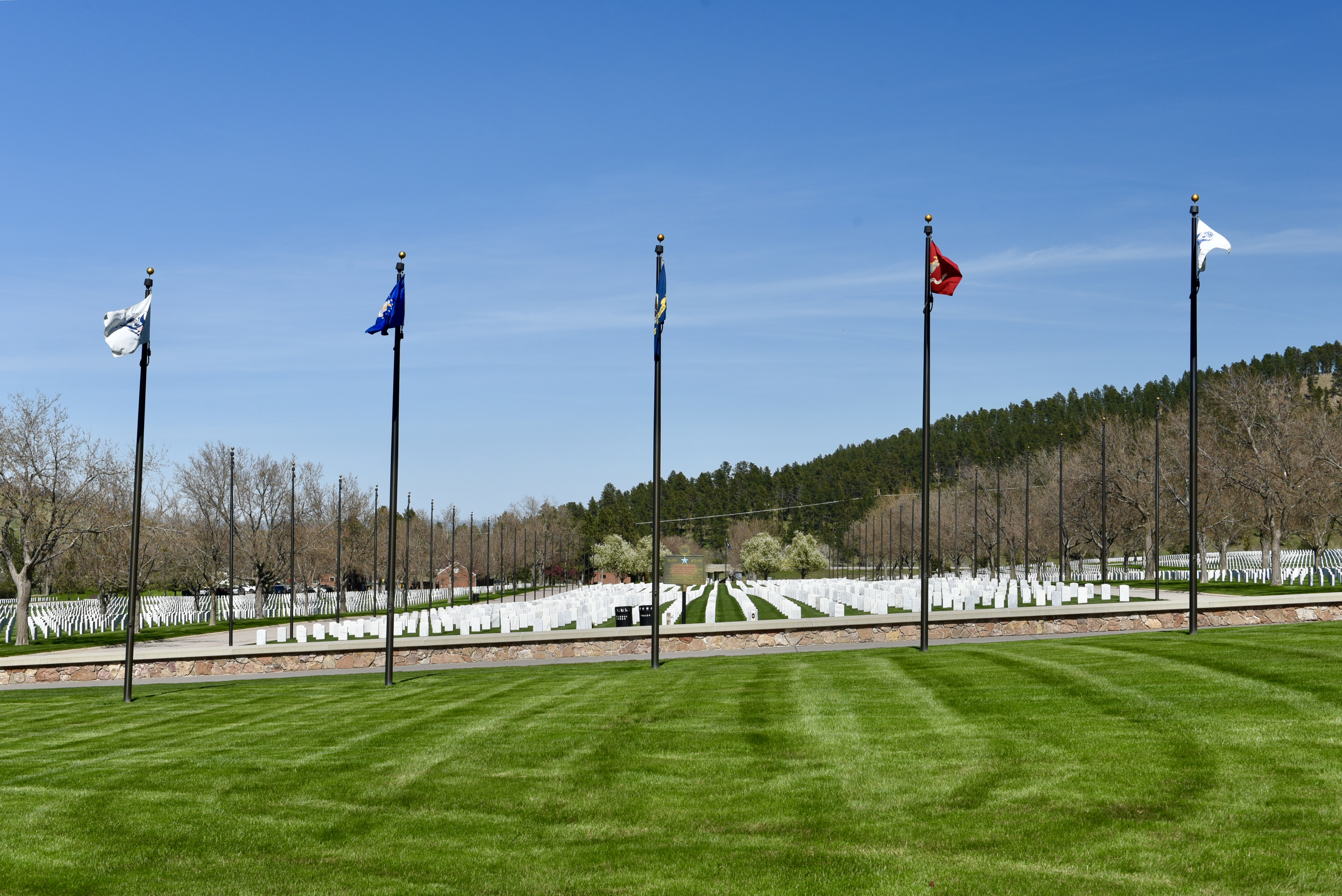
Part of the Avenue of Flags

The grounds themselves consist of a manicured grass lawn, upon which burials are carried out, with trees arranged or otherwise scattered throughout the property. The cemetery is subdivided into multiple sections numbered A–S and MA, MB, MG, and ML. These "M" sections, also called the Memory Stone sections, hold cenotaphs dedicated to service members who have gone missing in action (MIA) and whose bodies have not been recovered or identified.

The grave markers are marble upright headstones. All are uniform in appearance; each one weighs 230 pounds (100 kg) and is 42 inches (1.1 m) tall. The cemetery's policy is to maintain no more than 1/8 of an inch variance between each headstone.

The administration and maintenance buildings are all situated next to the entrance plaza on the northeast corner of the cemetery. The committal shelter sits at the back western edge of the cemetery. Three rectangular columbaria, located just east of the committal shelter, provide space for interment of ashes. South of the columbaria, a pond with a fountain sits on a hill on the southwest corner of the site; a red brick pump house is located next to the pond. Benches provide seating throughout the cemetery.

The cemetery's main thoroughfares are the North and South Mall Drives. These asphalt roads extend from the entrance south-westwards and terminate in a parking loop in front of the committal shelter. Mall Drive is also lined with the Avenue of Flags, a row of dozens of United States flags that are flown annually between May and October, as well as a POW/MIA flag. Several loop roads branch off of the Mall Drives and provide access to other sections of the cemetery. All roads are lined with concrete curbs, and widened pulloffs are positioned throughout the grounds.

=== Memorials ===
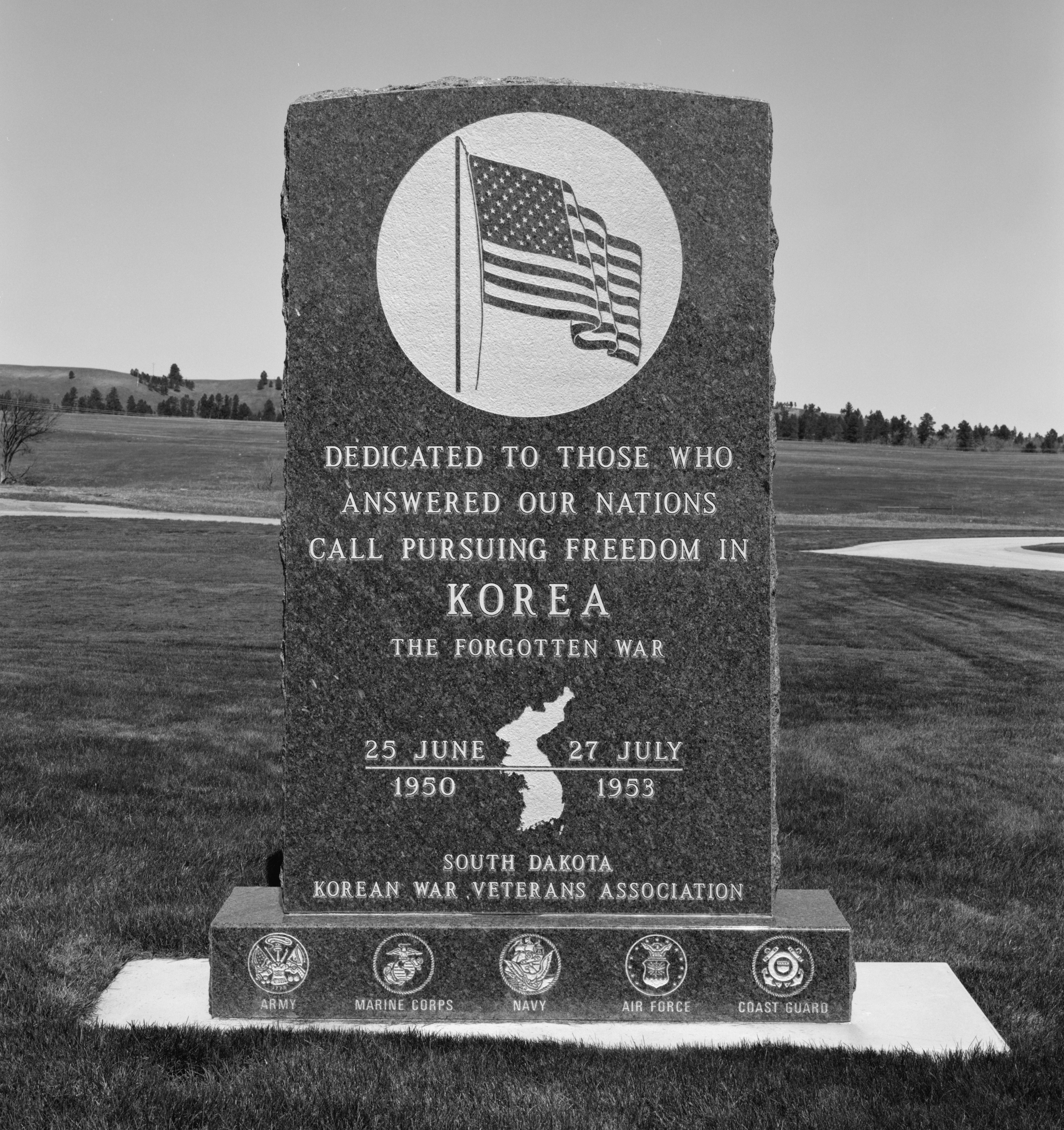
The Korean War Memorial in the cemetery

Several memorials, monuments, and commemorative plaques dedicated to service members of various conflicts have been placed in the cemetery. Plans for memorials dedicated to casualties and service during specific U.S. conflicts have been discussed at least as early as 1948. The extant memorials include:

- Memorial carillon: Installed in 1975, this carillon sits near the pond and features a tower with an associated memorial plaque. The system was first replaced in 1990 and a second time in 2005.
- Blue Star Memorial: In 2000, the Evergreen Garden Club of Hill City donated this monument to the cemetery administration. It is a simple aluminum plaque on a pole located opposite the entrance to the committal shelter, named for the blue star associated with service flags that are often posted along highways and military service sites.
- Korean War Memorial: Established in May 2002 by the South Dakota Korean War Veterans Association, this granite memorial commemorates the South Dakotan servicemembers of the Korean War. It sits just west of the committal shelter.
- Bivouac of the Dead: This is an aluminum plaque set on a granite base erected in 2003. It contains a portion of the poem of the same name by Theodore O'Hara.
- 52 Charlie Missing Wingman Memorial: A bronze plaque set in a granite monument dedicated to the memory of missing United States Air Force service members. It was unveiled by the USAF Pilot Training Class 52-Charlie in May 2007.
- Gettysburg Address plaque: A cast-iron plaque commemorating President Abraham Lincoln's 1863 Gettysburg Address was installed on Memorial Day 2012.
- Medal of Honor Bicentennial Plaque: A memorial commemorating recipients of the Medal of Honor, placed near Columbarium A. An associated memorial tree was removed in 2010 with the construction of the adjacent columbaria.
- Vietnam War Memorial: Similar to the Korean War Memorial, this monument memorializes those who served in the Vietnam War and was established in 2019.
- USN Seabees Memorial: In 2021, a new monument was dedicated to the United States Naval Construction Battalions, nicknamed Seabees.

== Notable interments ==
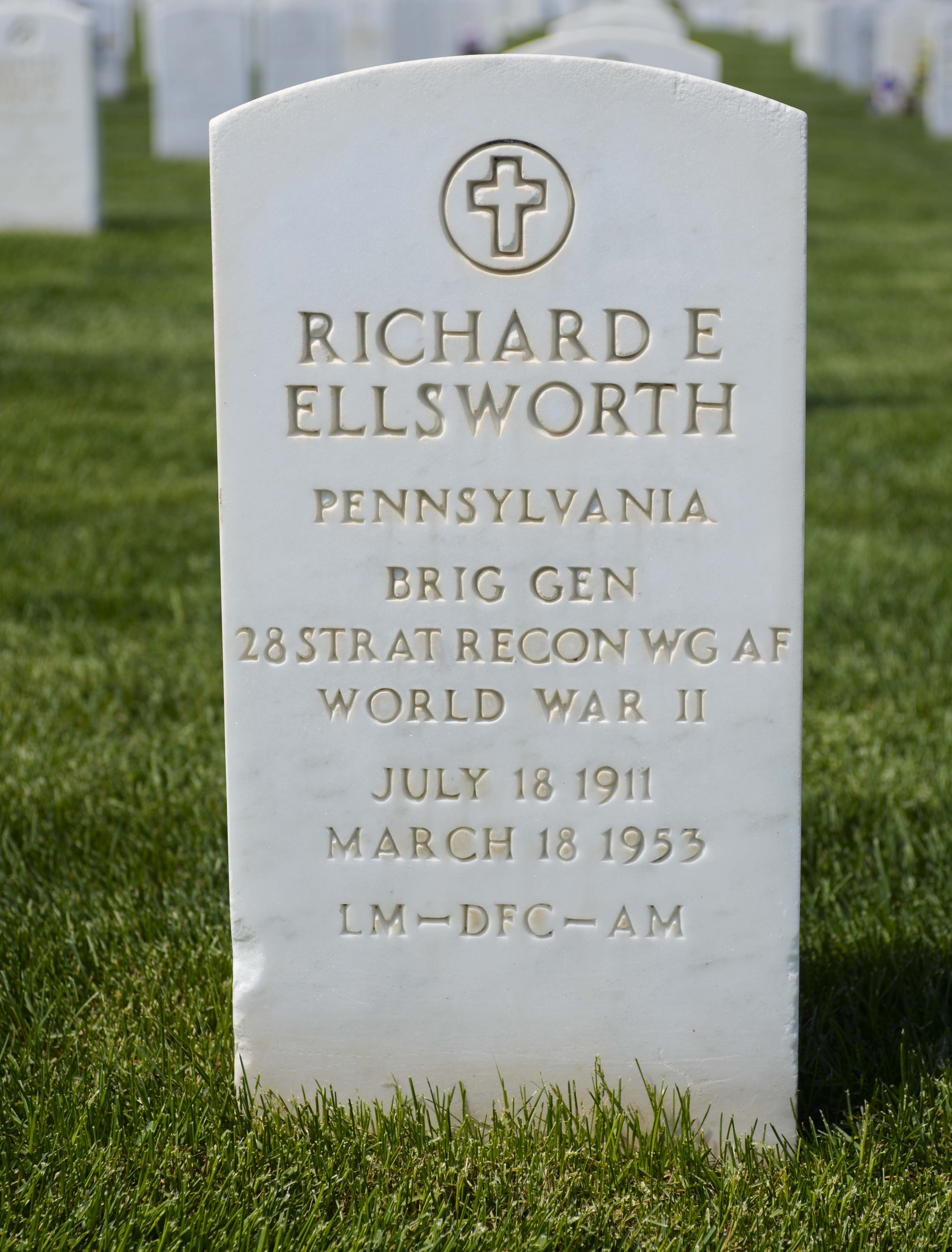
Richard Ellsworth's gravesite

Several notable individuals have been interred in the cemetery since its establishment in 1948. Two World War II Lakota code talkers, John Bear King and Clarence Eugene Wolf Guts, are buried here. Three victims of a B-36 crash that occurred near Ellsworth Air Force Base on August 27, 1954, were buried at the national cemetery in the days following the incident. Other notable graves include:

- James Abourezk, U.S. Senator, Korean War U.S. Navy veteran
- Dave Bald Eagle, Lakota chief, actor and stuntman, U.S. Army veteran
- Francis Higbee Case, U.S. Senator and Representative, World War I veteran
- Brigadier General Richard E. Ellsworth
- William J. Janklow, U.S. Representative and Governor of South Dakota, U.S. Marine
- Doris Leader Charge, Lakota educator and actress
- Commander John Charles Waldron (cenotaph only), U.S. Navy, lost at sea during the Battle of Midway, Distinguished Flying Cross recipient
- Charles Windolph, Medal of Honor recipient for action at the Battle of Little Bighorn during the Indian Wars

== See also ==
- List of cemeteries in South Dakota
- National Register of Historic Places listings in Meade County, South Dakota
