= Flanagan Hotel =

Flanagan Hotel may refer to:

- Hotel Senator (Saskatoon), formerly Flanagan Hotel, Saskatoon, Saskatchewan, Canada
- Flanagan Hotel (New York), Malone, New York
