= Jakob Stilling =

German ophthalmologist (1842–1915)

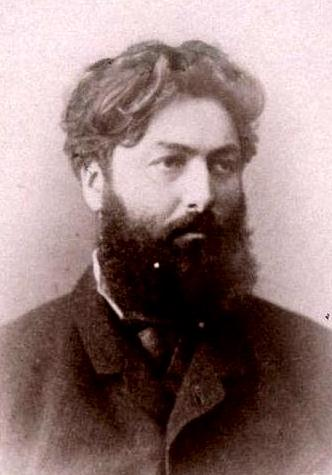
Jakob Stilling

Jakob Stilling (22 September 1842 – 30 April 1915) was a German ophthalmologist from Kassel.

He studied medicine at several locations including Paris and Würzburg, and obtained his doctorate in 1865. In 1867 he became an eye doctor in Kassel, later furthering his education in ophthalmic medicine at Paris, Berlin, Vienna and Turin. In 1884 he became a titular professor at the University of Strassburg, where he worked for the remainder of his career. He was the son of surgeon Benedikt Stilling (1810-1879).

In 1887 Stilling described an eye movement disorder that was to become known as "Stilling's syndrome". This disorder goes by several other names, including "Duane syndrome", being named after American ophthalmologist Alexander Duane (1858-1926), who studied several clinical cases of the disorder, and in 1905 provided a more comprehensive description of its symptoms. This condition is characterised by limited abduction and/or limited adduction of the eye.

In 1877 he introduced "Stilling's colour table", which were the first pseudoisochromatic plates used in diagnosis of colour blindness, predating the now ubiquitous Ishihara test by 40 years. Among his written works was a study on glaucoma called Zur Theorie des Glaukoms, a treatise that was published in Albrecht von Graefe's Archiv für Ophthalmologie.

== Publications ==
- Pseudo-isochromatische Tafeln zur Prüfung des Farbensinnes (1889); translated into English as Plates for colour vision testing (2014) from the 34th German edition (by Kuchenbecker & Broschmann, ISBN 978-3-13-175481-3)
- Anilin-Farbstoffe als Antiseptica und ihre Anwendung in der Praxis . Vol. 2, Trübner, Strassburg 1890 Digital edition by the University and State Library Düsseldorf
