= Hot Springs National Cemetery =

Veterans cemetery in Fall River County, South Dakota

Coordinates: 43°26′25″N 103°28′19″W

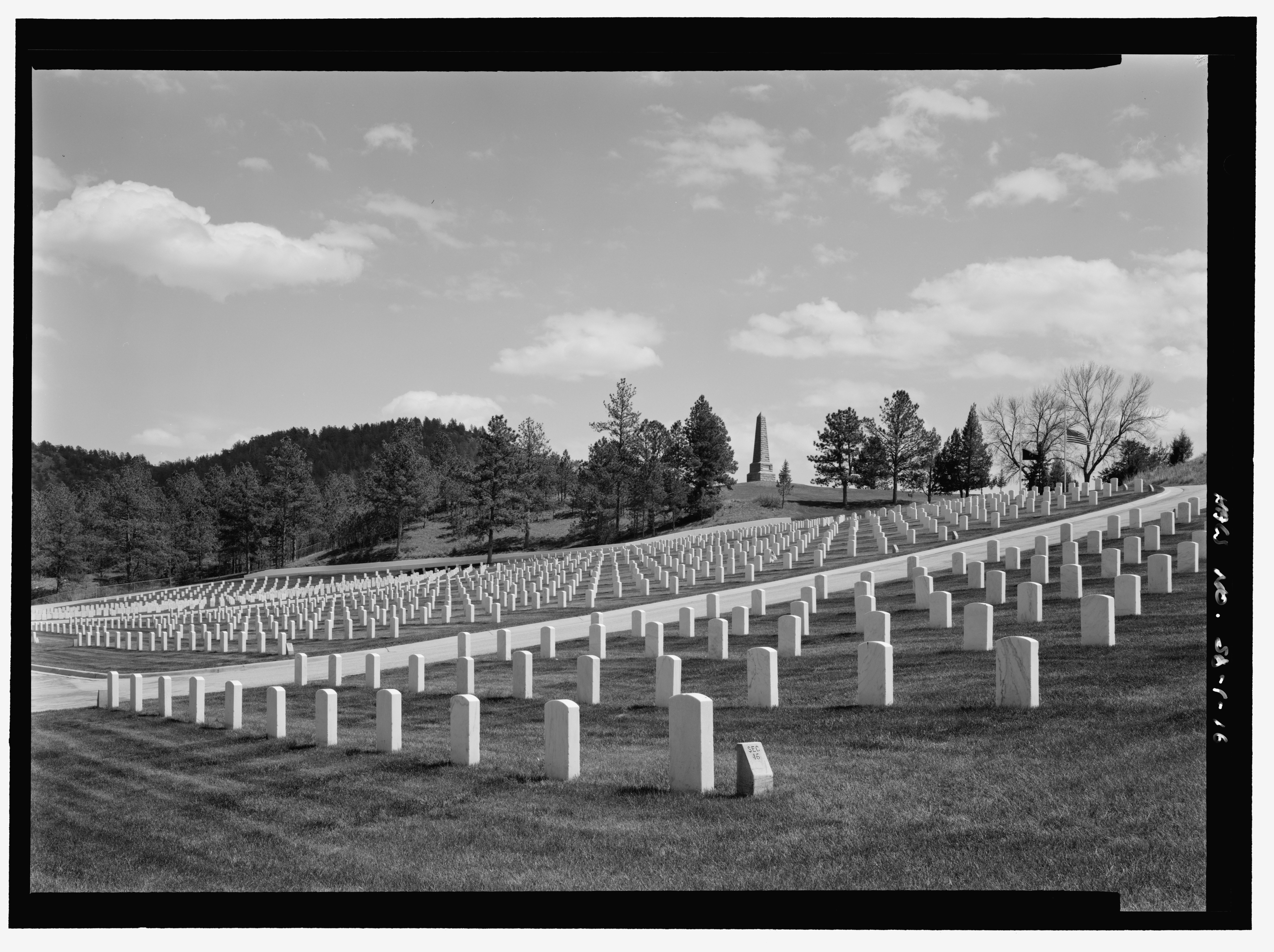
- This Historic American Buildings Survey image shows the cemetery from the north-west corner.
- Interactive map of Hot Springs National Cemetery

Details
- Location: Hot Springs, South Dakota
- Type: United States National Cemetery
- Size: 8.7 acres (3.5 ha)
- No. of interments: Over 1,500

Hot Springs National Cemetery is a United States National Cemetery in the city of Hot Springs in Fall River County, South Dakota. It encompasses 8.7 acres (3.5 ha), and as of 2014, had 1,501 interments. The United States Department of Veterans Affairs manages it through the Black Hills National Cemetery.

== History ==
In 1902 a veterans care facility was constructed in the area, and the cemetery was established to inter veterans who died while residing there. It was transferred to the National Cemetery system in 1973.

Hot Springs National Cemetery was listed on the National Register of Historic Places in 1974.

== Notable interments ==
- Lieutenant Charles L. Russell (1844–1910), Medal of Honor recipient for action at the Battle of Spotsylvania Court House during the Civil War.
