= Benedict Stilling =

German anatomist and surgeon

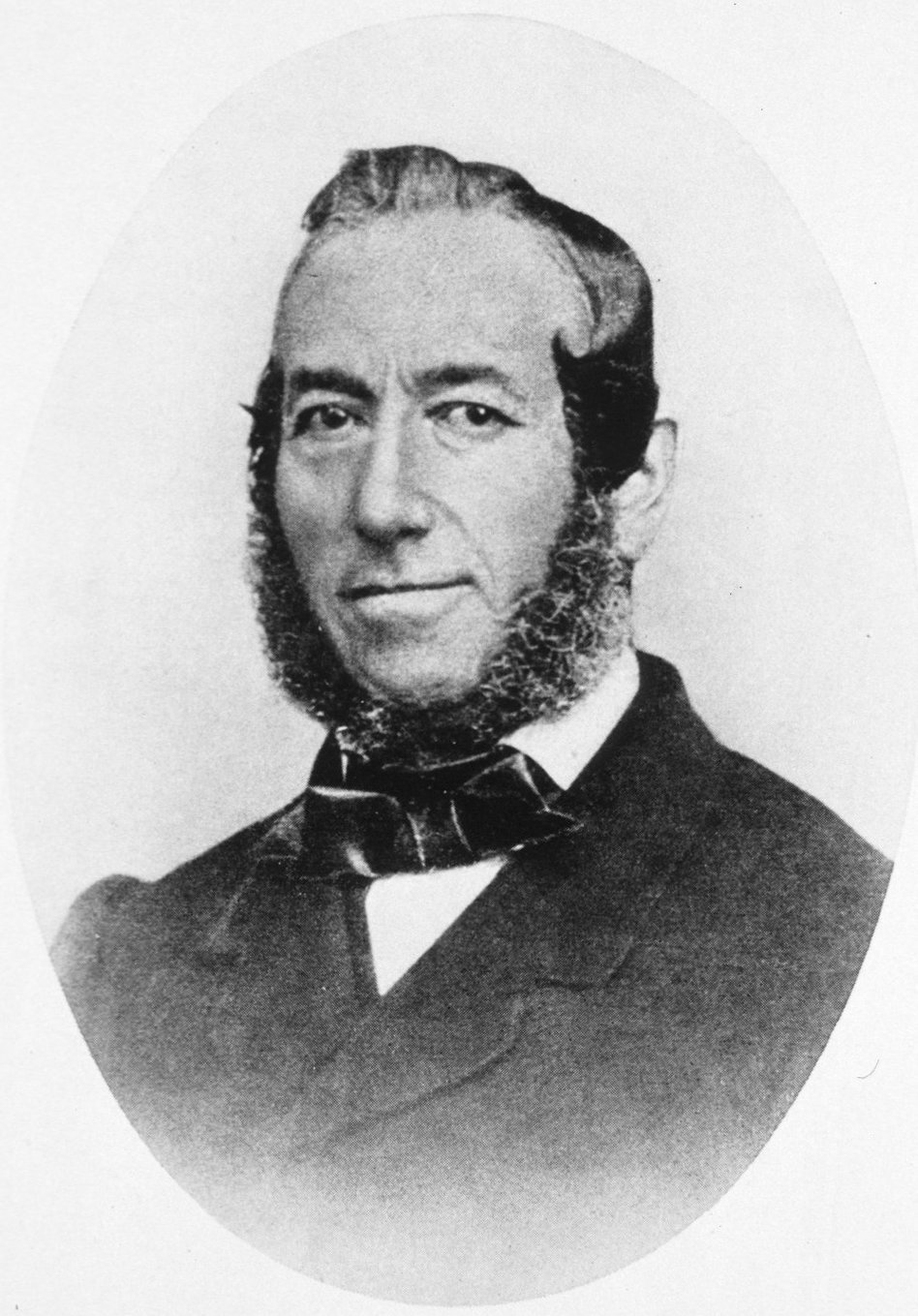
Benedikt Stilling (1810–1879)

Benedikt Stilling (11 February 1810 – 28 January 1879) was a German anatomist and surgeon who was a native of Kirchhain. He was the father of German ophthalmologist Jakob Stilling (1842–1915).

In 1832 he received his doctorate from the University of Marburg. Later he had a private practice in Kassel, and travelled extensively throughout Europe, particularly Paris, where he collaborated with physicians that included Claude Bernard (1813–1873), Jean-Martin Charcot (1825–1893) and Jean Zuléma Amussat (1796–1856).

Stilling made important contributions in the field of neurology. He performed research involving the structure of the cerebellum, as well as histological studies of the pons. In 1840 he made first mention of vasomotor nerves in a treatise titled Physiologisch-pathologische und medicinisch-praktische Untersuchungen über die Spinal-Irritation. Also, he is remembered for introducing a procedure of serial-section portrayal (thin slicing) of spinal cord specimens for histological study.

Stilling performed the first ovariotomy in Germany, using an extraperitoneal technique that minimized excessive internal bleeding. This procedure is explained in his paper, Geschichte einer Exstirpation eines krankhaft vergrösserten Ovariums.

== Eponyms associated with Benedict Stilling ==
- Stilling's canal: a small channel that runs through the vitreous humor between the optic disk nerve and the lens in the eye.
- Fleece of Stilling: a mesh of myelinated fibers surrounding the dentate nucleus of the cerebellum.
