= Titus Mountain =

Mountain in New York, United States

Coordinates: 44°45′48″N 74°14′07″W

- Interactive map of Titus Mountain
- Location: Malone, New York /, U.S.
- Vertical: 1,200 ft (370 m)
- Top elevation: 2,025 ft (617 m)
- Base elevation: 825 ft (251 m)
- Trails: 53
- Lift system: 10 chairs: (2 triple, 6 double); 2 surface lifts
- Snowfall: 150in (279cm)
- Snowmaking: 90%
- Website: https://www.titusmountain.com/

Titus Mountain or Titus as it is colloquially known, is a popular downhill ski area spread over 3 mountains of northern New York, 7 miles (11 km) south of the Village of Malone, in the Town of Malone, in Franklin County, New York. The area has a base elevation of 825 feet (251 m), summit elevation of 2,025 feet (617 m) and a vertical drop of 1,200 feet (370 m). Titus is part of the Adirondack Mountains. The ski area has 52 trails and glades over three interconnected mountains. Titus operates 10 lifts and a three-lane tubing hill.

== Resort statistics ==
- Annual snowfall: 381 centimetres (150 in)
- Total area size: 380 acres (1,500,000 m^{2})
- Number of Lifts: 10
- Number of Trails/Glades/Parks: 52
