= Fort Meade National Cemetery =

Veterans cemetery in Meade County, South Dakota

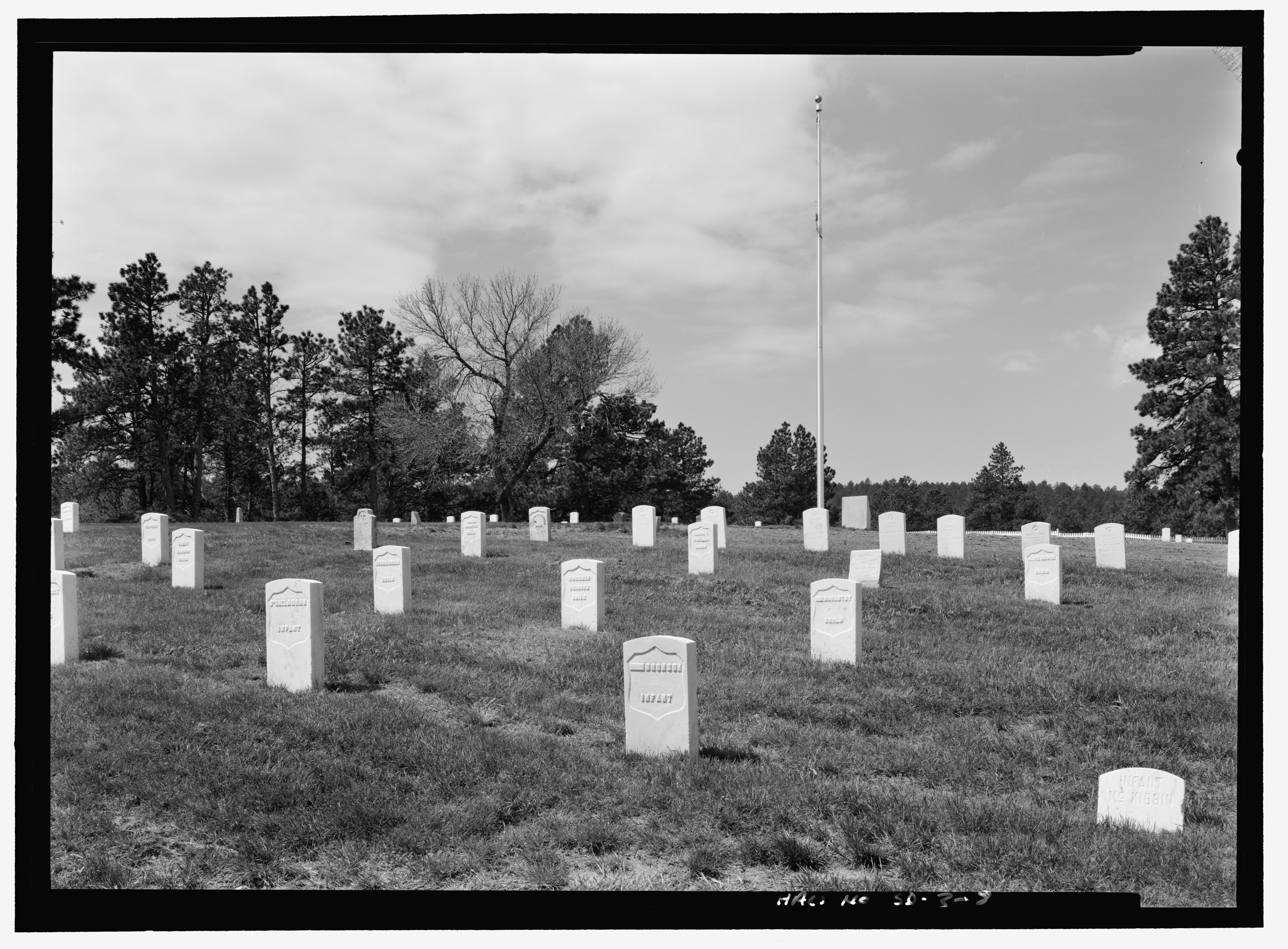
- Interactive map of Fort Meade National Cemetery

Details
- Established: 1878
- Location: Sturgis, South Dakota
- Country: United States
- Coordinates: 44°24′09″N 103°28′35″W
- Type: United States National Cemetery (closed to new interments)
- Size: 1.9 acres (0.77 ha)
- No. of graves: 235
- Find a Grave: Fort Meade National Cemetery

Fort Meade National Cemetery is a United States National Cemetery located near the city of Sturgis in Meade County, South Dakota. Administered by the United States Department of Veterans Affairs, it encompasses 1.9 acres (0.77 ha). It is maintained by Black Hills National Cemetery.

== History ==
The cemetery was first established by the surviving members of George Armstrong Custer's 7th Cavalry on September 24, 1878, not long after Fort Meade was constructed. It was named for General George Meade. It has been closed to new interments since the end of World War II.

Fort Meade National Cemetery was placed on the National Register of Historic Places on May 22, 1973.

== Noteworthy monuments ==
- An obelisk monument honors the memory of two soldiers from the 7th Cavalry.

== Notable interments ==
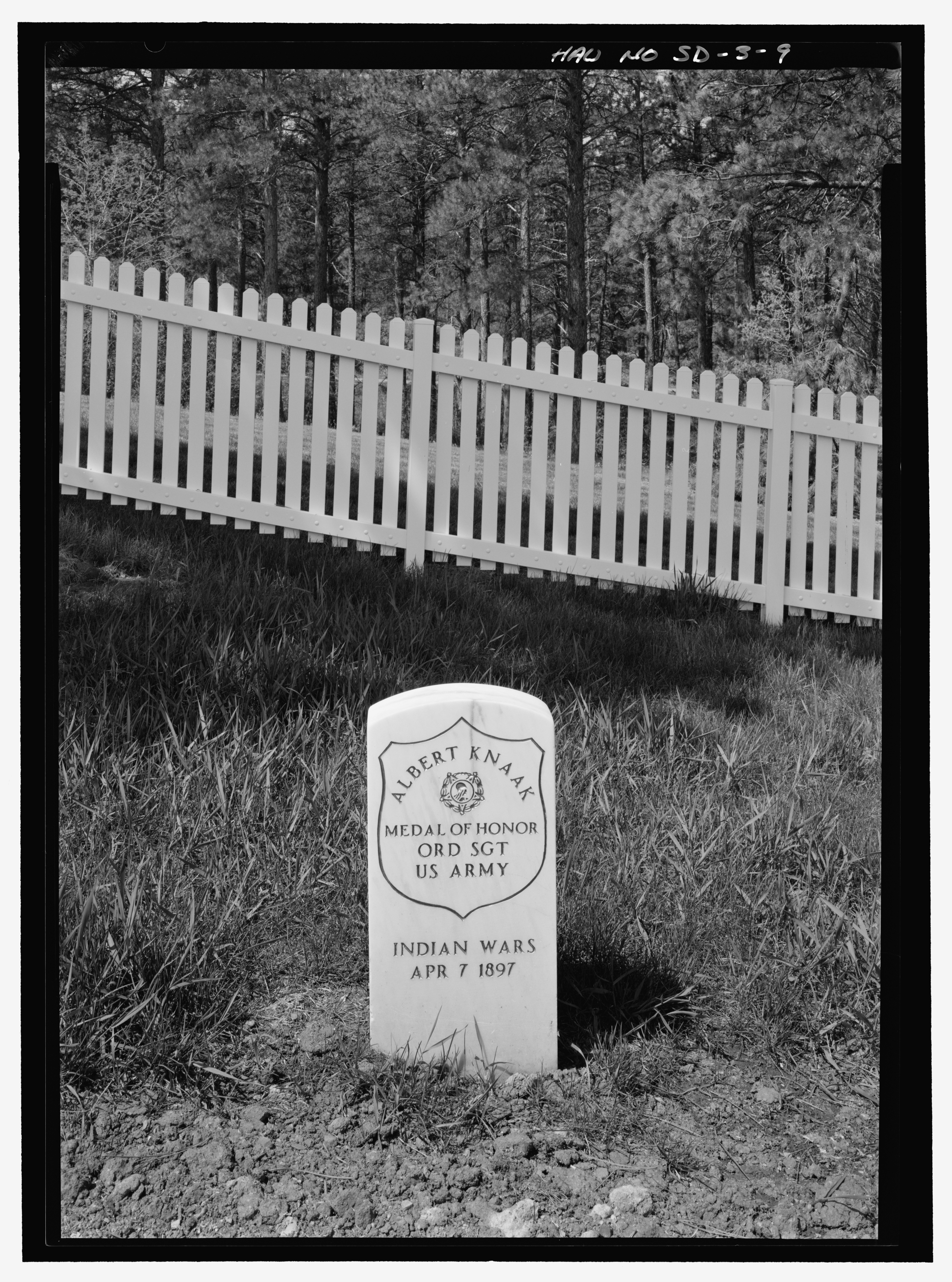
Grave of Albert Knaak (1840–1897), Medal of Honor recipient

- Private Abram Brant (1849–1878), a Medal of Honor recipient for action at the Battle of the Little Bighorn, during the Indian Wars (cenotaph).
- Private Albert Knaak (1840–1897), a Medal of Honor recipient for action in Arizona Territory during the Indian Wars.
