= Fort Meade (South Dakota) =

Military base in South Dakota, United States

Coordinates: 44°24′34″N 103°28′16″W

- near Sturgis, South Dakota in United States
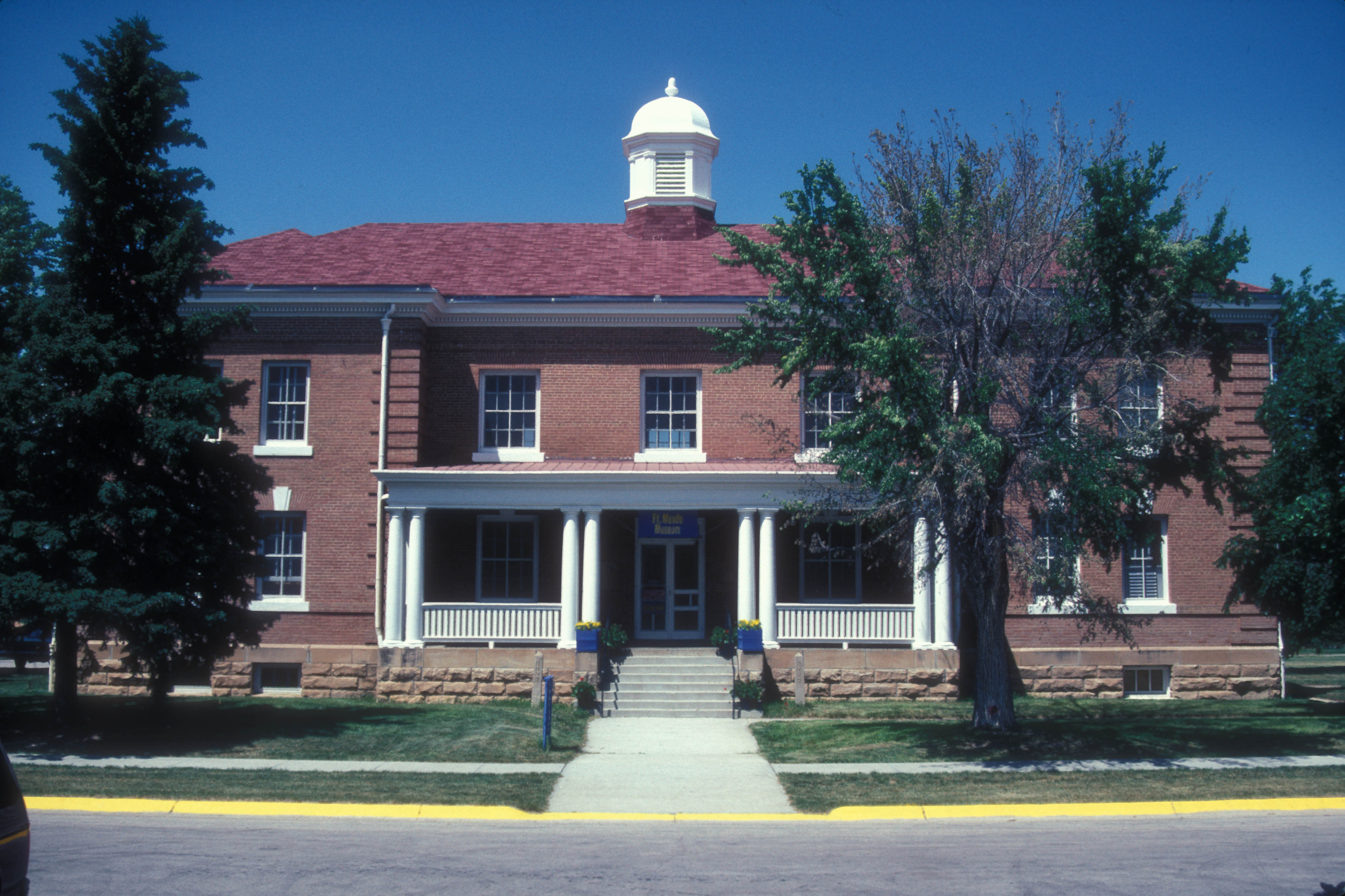
- Fort Meade commanding officer's house, now the museum, 2007

Site information
- Controlled by: United States

Location
- Location within South Dakota

Site history
- Built: 1878
- In use: 1878-1944
- Battles/wars: Indian Wars

Garrison information
- Past commanders: Major Henry M. Lazelle, 1st Infantry; Colonel James W. Forsyth, 7th Cavalry; Colonel Samuel D. Sturgis, 7th Cavalry
- Garrison: 1st U.S. Infantry; 7th U.S. Cavalry; 25th U.S. Infantry; 8th U.S. Cavalry; 3rd U.S. Infantry; 10th U.S. Cavalry; 4th U.S. Cavalry
- Fort Meade District
- U.S. National Register of Historic Places
- U.S. Historic district
- Area: 3,200 acres (1,300 ha)
- Architectural style: Greek Revival
- NRHP reference No.: 73001747
- Added to NRHP: May 22, 1973

Fort Meade, originally known as Camp Sturgis and later Camp Ruhlen, is a former United States Army post located just east of Sturgis, South Dakota, United States. The fort was active from 1878 to 1944; the cantonment is currently home to a Veterans Health Administration hospital and South Dakota Army National Guard training facilities. Much of the former reservation is now managed by the Bureau of Land Management as the Fort Meade Recreation Area. It is also home of Fort Meade National Cemetery. Fort Meade was established in 1878 to protect white settlements in the northern Black Hills, especially the nearby gold mining area around Deadwood. Several stage and freighting routes passed through Fort Meade en route to Deadwood.

For most of the past 130 years, there has been some military presence at Fort Meade, near Sturgis, South Dakota. Many cavalry and infantry units were stationed here, including the 7th U.S. Cavalry after the Battle of the Little Bighorn; the Buffalo Soldiers of the 25th U.S. Infantry; the 4th U.S. Cavalry, which saw the transition from horses to mechanization; and the 88th Glider Infantry Regiment during World War II.

Fort Meade was designated a National Historic District on May 22, 1973, the first location in Meade County, South Dakota, to be placed on the National Register of Historic Places. Today, it functions as a public museum.

Part of the South Dakota Centennial Trail runs through the Fort Meade Recreation Area.

== History ==
=== Establishment ===
In the Fort Laramie Treaty of 1868, the Black Hills of South Dakota were set aside for the use of the Lakota people as part of the Great Sioux Reservation. However, the discovery of gold in the region in the 1870s prompted numerous whites to illegally enter the reservation; these trespassers demanded protection from the United States Army. A temporary United States military camp was established in August, 1876, on Spring Creek a little north of Bear Butte and named Camp Sturgis, in honor of 2nd Lt. James G. Sturgis, who was killed at the Battle of the Little Bighorn. During the occupation of this camp, the present site of Fort Meade, situated just outside the eastern foothills of the Black Hills, and on the south side of Bear Butte Creek, was selected and located as a permanent United States military post, which was established and garrisoned on August 31, 1878.

The new post replaced Camp J.C. Sturgis, started in July 1878, about two miles northwest of nearby Bear Butte, was first named Camp Ruhlen for Lt. George Ruhlen, 17th U.S. Infantry quartermaster officer who supervised the building of the post. It was established by Major Henry M. Lazelle, 1st U.S. Infantry, and companies D and H of the 11th U.S. Infantry on a site selected by Lieutenant General Philip H. Sheridan, on the east side of Bear Butte Creek, in the Black Hills, fourteen miles northeast of the town of Deadwood, South Dakota.

General Order No. 27, issued at Department of Dakota Headquarters, announced that the Secretary of War had designated the post "Fort Meade" in honor of Major General George G. Meade, of Civil War fame. The first commander was Colonel Samuel D. Sturgis, 7th Cavalry.

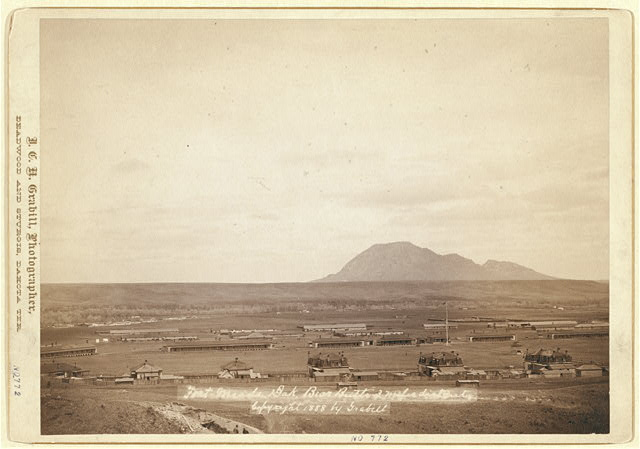
Birds-eye view of Fort Meade, 1888

The work of building the post, for which an appropriation of $100,000.00 had been made, was begun on August 28, 1878, and completed in August 1879. The original appropriation not proving sufficient to meet the cost of the necessary buildings an additional appropriation of $11,000, and later a special appropriation of $13,000, was made for post hospital.

=== Military operations ===
Like the previous military installations on the site, Fort Meade functioned as an important command center for the United States during the Indian Wars and the expansion of pioneer Americans into the area. This also supported the development of the nearby town of Sturgis, which thrived on the business brought by the soldiers and their families. To a lesser extent, the fort's troops also deterred range wars and acted as peacekeepers during land disputes among the settlers. In 1880, Major Marcus Reno was court-martialed at Fort Meade following his actions at the Battle of the Little Bighorn; Reno was ultimately discharged from service. Meanwhile, activities at the fort centered around controlling the local Native American populations, particularly the Lakota, during a time of increasing unrest. This culminated in the Ghost Dance War and Wounded Knee Massacre of 1890 at the Pine Ridge Indian Reservation, in which the Seventh Cavalry stationed at Fort Meade, led by Colonel Forsyth, participated.

Soldiers at Fort Meade later quelled an uprising of the Ute people between 1906 and 1908. A large number of Ute moved from the Uintah and Ouray Indian Reservation in Utah to South Dakota by way of Wyoming in the 1900s, deciding to seek shelter in the Black Hills after the government made the decision to allot their own reservation. After negotiations broke down in late 1906 and the Ute refused to return, soldiers from Fort Meade's Sixth Cavalry were called in to move the Ute to Fort Meade while their delegates travelled to Washington, D.C. to negotiate further. The Ute camped at Alkali Creek just south of Fort Meade, surveilled by the army, until the summer of 1907. The Ute were then moved to the Thunder Butte area of the Cheyenne River Indian Reservation. However, the situation quickly broke down as the Ute requested more rations and also refused to comply with the government's expectation their children attend the residential school, fearing their children would die there as they had at the residential schools in Utah. In October 1907, the Ute began an open rebellion against the federal government, and cavalry from Fort Meade were sent to the reservation; this quickly quieted down, and in June 1908, the Ute agreed to return to Utah and were escorted by the Tenth Cavalry.

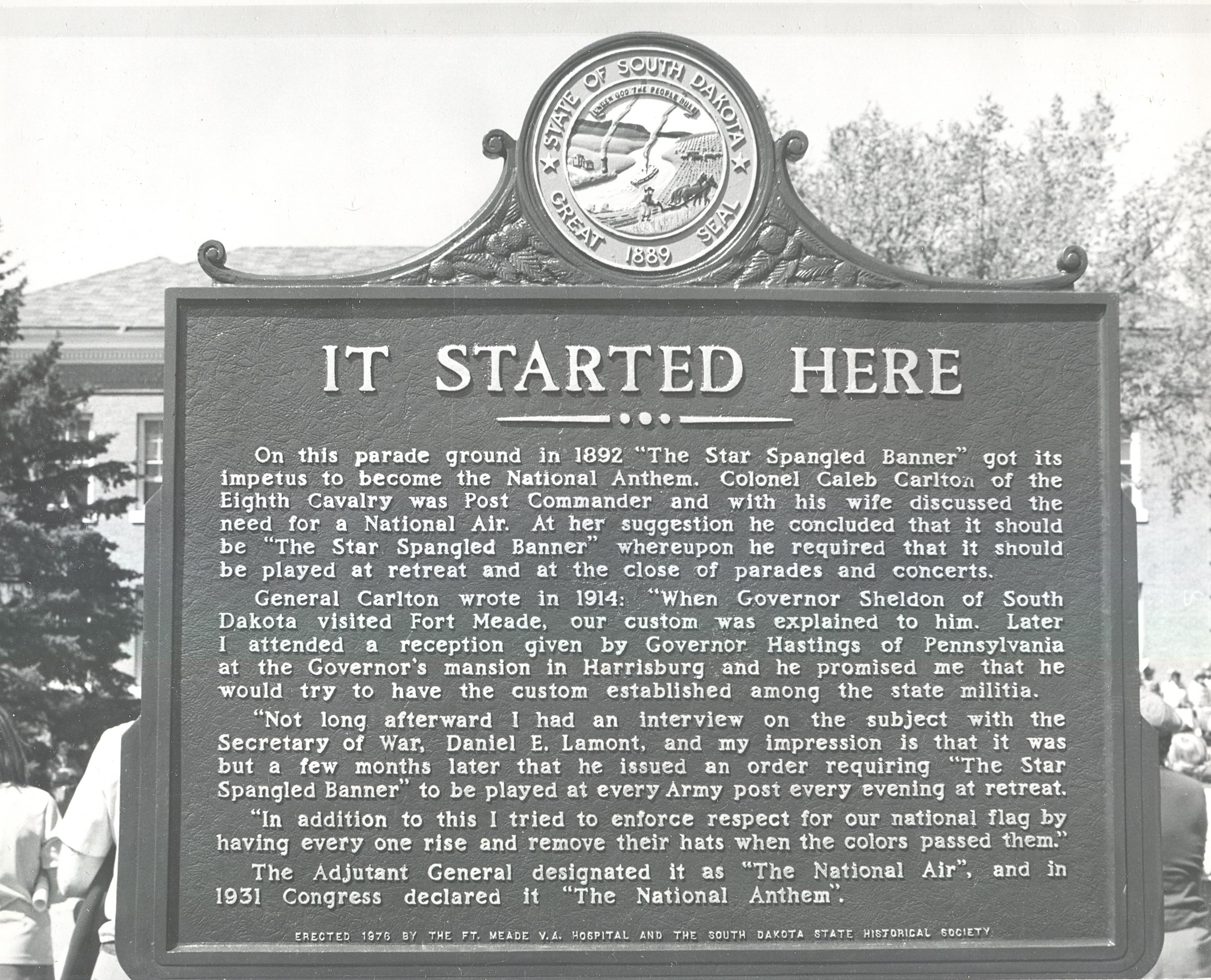
"Star Spangled Banner" historic marker

It was at Fort Meade that the "Star Spangled Banner" first became the official music for the military retreat ceremony, long before it became the national anthem. In 1892, the post commander Colonel Caleb H. Carlton, 8th Cavalry, began the custom of playing the "Star Spangled Banner" at military ceremonies and requested that all people rise and pay it proper respect long before it became the national anthem.

=== Decline and disestablishment as a fort ===
By the 1890s, the fort was already becoming dated. The original buildings were beginning to age, and the fort's water supply had been threatened by the development of Sturgis, which had built a sewer system very close to Fort Meade's water source—a natural spring that was also susceptible to drought. Brigadier General James F. Wade described the fort at this time as "unsanitary". Fort Meade requested $150,000 for renovation funds, but initially only $30,000 was awarded. Shortly after, the United States Army reviewed the situation in the Dakotas and decided to disband several smaller forts and outposts and make Fort Meade a more permanent installation. They then invested over $1,000,000 into developing the fort, which enabled the replacement of the older structures.

By 1910, however, the American West had fully outgrown the fort's original purposes, and instead it began functioning more as a training ground and to develop mechanized cavalry units. Fort Meade sat largely abandoned after World War I until the mid-1920s, when the federal government re-introduced troops to the site for a brief time. During the Great Depression, Civilian Conservation Corps and Works Progress Administration workers were hosted at the fort as they carried out multiple conservation and construction projects in the region. A few smaller regiments continued to be assigned to the fort in dwindling numbers and for briefer periods of time. By the early years of World War II, despite the support of Sturgis residents, the army could no longer defend a military need for the site.

=== Fort Meade Veterans Administration Hospital ===
- Fort Meade Veterans Administration Hospital
- U.S. National Register of Historic Places
- U.S. Historic district
- Built: 1945
- MPS: United States Third Generation Veterans Hospitals, 1946–1958
- NRHP reference No.: 100002467
- Added to NRHP: May 29, 2018

Talk of turning Fort Meade into a Veterans Health Administration hospital dated back to the aftermath of World War I, when military presence at Fort Meade had begun to wane and the demand for veterans' health services skyrocketed and began to overwhelm the available resources. However, the penultimate decision to turn the fort into a hospital did not come until the mid-1940s. The War Department allocated approximately 8,357 acres (3,382 ha) of land for the new hospital grounds. German prisoners of war, overseen by troops from Fort Robinson, were sent to turn the site into a suitable hospital and later remained as staff until January 1946. The main focus of the hospital would be to treat mental, psychiatric, and neurological disorders, as well as physical ailments. Old buildings were repurposed: the barracks were converted into patient housing and therapy offices, stables formed part of the kitchen, and the old hospital building housed the radiology and pharmacy departments. An on-site 495-acre (200 ha) farm was also added to serve the kitchen and provide occupational therapy for patients (this was removed in the 1960s). About $300,000 is estimated to have been spent on the initial construction. The dedication was held on April 6, 1945, and was attended by Charles Windolph, the last surviving United States Army soldier at the Battle of the Little Bighorn, as the guest of honor.

The VA decided, despite the renovations, that the long-term goal would be to construct entirely new, modern-style buildings, and hired on the Saint Paul, Minnesota-based Ellerbe & Company architectural firm to design a new complex. The construction concluded in the early 1960s and resulted in the creation of two new medical wings with a combined 340-bed capacity on the north side of the site. The VA also began selling off unused parts of the large acreage to various buyers, including the City of Sturgis and the Bureau of Land Management; by the 1970s, the complex reached its current size of about 250 acres (100 ha). The VA also dismantled unused structures and sold the materials and made improvements to the main hospital wing, including automatic doors and heated sidewalks. By 1983, the South Dakota National Guard and the Army National Guard Officer Candidate School had begun using some of the old unused barracks.

== Garrison history ==
The original garrison consisted of Troops E and M, Seventh Cavalry, and Companies F and K, First Infantry, with Major H. M. Lazelle, of First United States Infantry, in command. In June 1879, the garrison was reinforced by the arrival of band and troops C and G, Seventh Cavalry, and on July 10, 1879, by troops A and H, Seventh Cavalry, at which time Col. S. D. Sturgis assumed command of the post. In September 1879, Companies D and H, First Infantry, from Fort Sully, joined, increasing the garrison to four companies of infantry and six troops of cavalry.

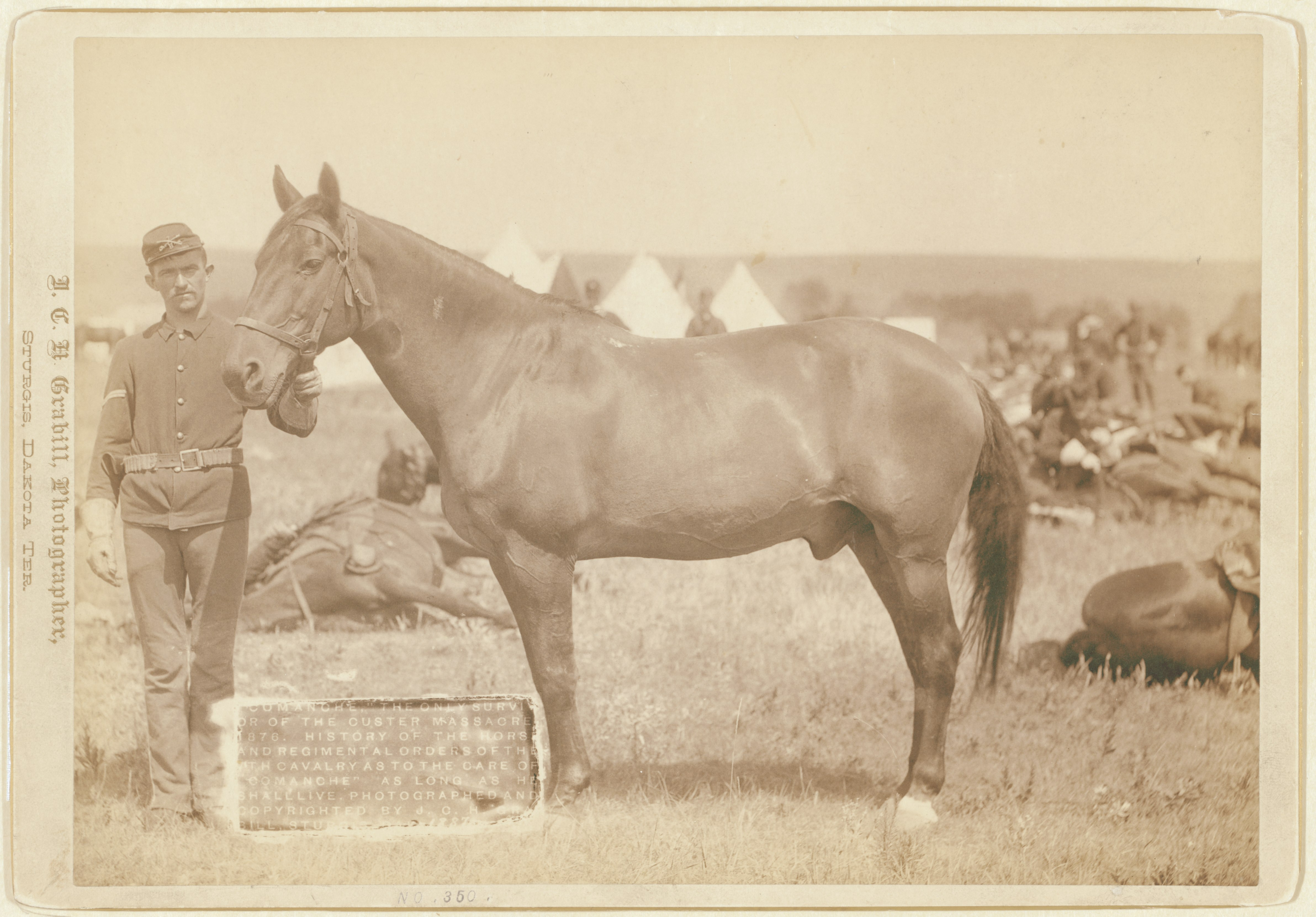
Comanche in 1876

In June 1879, the horse named Comanche, who survived the Battle of the Little Bighorn, was brought to Fort Meade by the Seventh Cavalry Regiment. There he was kept like a prince until 1888 when he was taken to Fort Riley, Kansas. He died at Fort Riley a few years later and was buried with military honors. Shortly thereafter the horse's remains were sent to a taxidermist, and in the early 1900s Comanche was displayed at the Natural History Museum at the University of Kansas in Lawrence, Kansas. A restoration of the display was completed in 2005.

On May 13, 1880, Companies D, F, H, and K, left for Texas, and were replaced by Companies A, D, H, and K, Twenty-fifth Infantry (colored), with Capt. D. D. Van Valzah, Twenty-fifth Infantry, in temporary command, Col. Sturgis being absent on leave. On May 19, 1881, Col. Sturgis resumed command, but relinquished in June, going to Washington, D. C., to take charge of the Soldiers' Home. From that time the post was commanded successively by Capt. Van Vajzah, Twenty-fifth Infantry; Major Edward Ball, Seventh Cavalry; and Col. Joseph G. Tilford, Seventh Cavalry, until July 1886, when Col. James W. Forsyth was assigned to the command and remained until June, 1887.

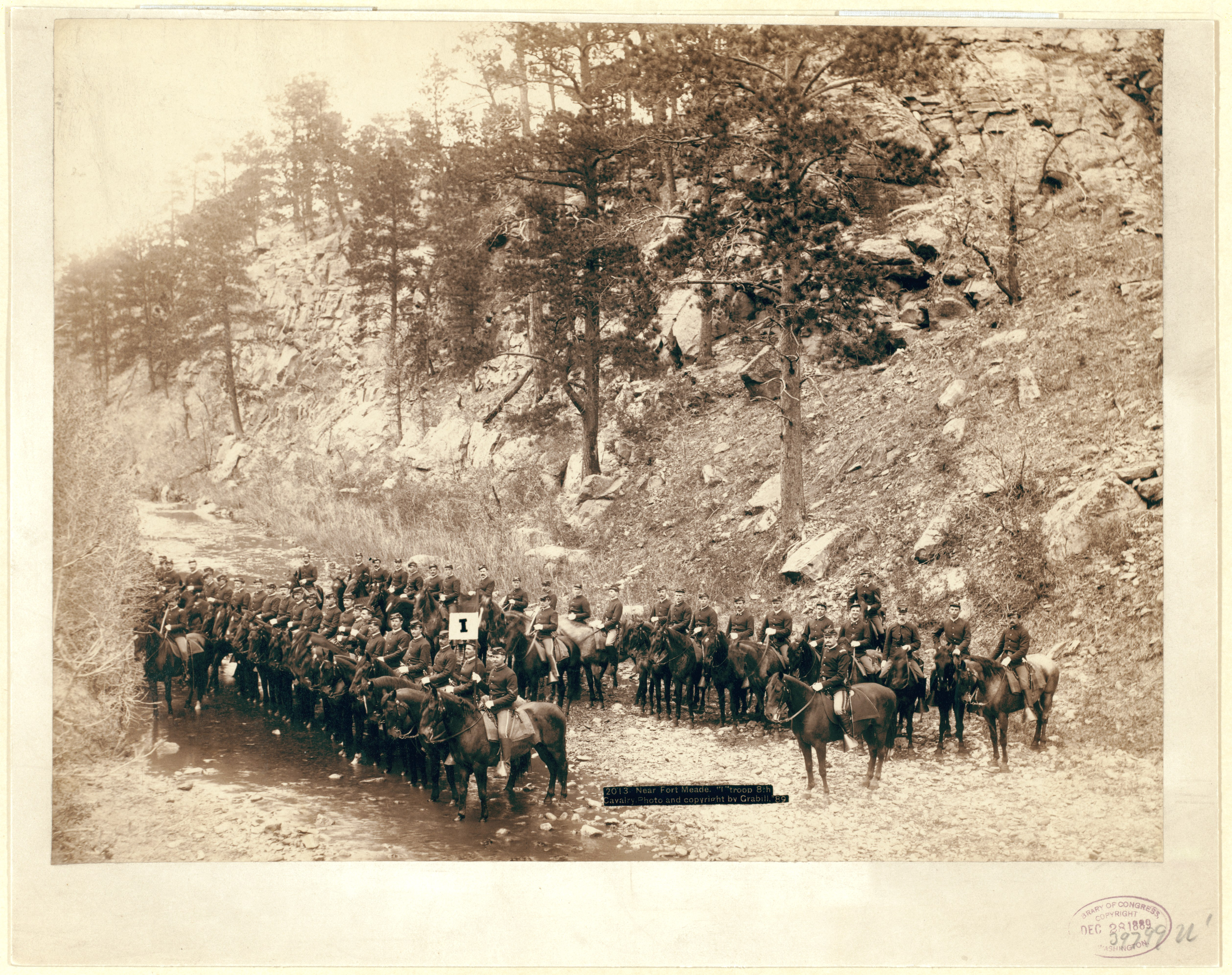
Eighth Infantry near Fort Meade, 1889

In 1887, the four companies of the Twenty-fifth Infantry were replaced by four companies of Third Infantry. In June 1888, the Seventh Cavalry Regiment was sent to Fort Riley, Kansas, and the Third Infantry to some other point, when the post was regarrisoned by the Eighth Cavalry Regiment, consisting of eight troops under the command of Col. Elmer Otis. In January 1891, Col. Otis was superseded by Col. C. H. Carleton, who was retired from active service in June 1897, when Col. John M. Bacon took command of the garrison.

In 1891, several Native American troops were recruited by the United States Army, with the intention to foster peaceful relations between the tribes and the white settlers. Troop L of the Third Cavalry was one such garrison at Fort Meade; however, it was disbanded in 1895 after the United States Army deemed the initiative unsuccessful.

Soon after the beginning of the Spanish–American War, Col. Bacon was ordered to St. Paul, Minnesota, leaving the post in charge of Major Robt. McGregor. Pending the war, the Eighth Cavalry Regiment, which had occupied the post for ten years, was broken up and scattered, the last troops leaving on October 6, 1898, for Huntsville, Alabama, from where they were to be sent to join the army of occupation in Cuba. The garrison, in October 1898, consisted of two troops of the First United States Cavalry, transferred there from the battlefields of San Juan Hill and El Caney.

Between World War I and World War II, Fort Meade hosted the Fourth Cavalry. After the Fourth Cavalry was deployed to Europe during World War II, a branch of the Women's Army Corps and the 620th Engineer General Service Company were garrisoned there briefly until about 1942.

== Features and architecture ==
The 3,200-acre (1,300 ha) Fort Meade District encompasses the entirety of the fort's original and expanded territory, including the Fort Meade National Cemetery, and the current Fort Meade Veterans Administration Hospital. Most of the original timber-frame buildings no longer exist, having been replaced in the early 20th century by more permanent brick and stone structures. Most of these replacement buildings, installed between 1900 and 1910, reflect elements of Greek Revival architecture. Additional work was done in the 1930s by the Works Progress Administration. Since its establishment, the fort has at different times included a sawmill; schoolhouse; library; hospital; cemetery; bakery; granary; barracks and other lodgings; cavalry stables; guardhouses; recreation hall; swimming pool; firing and training grounds; and other assorted offices, storage, and support buildings.

== See also ==
- Department of Dakota forts
