= Duane syndrome =

Rare congenital disease characterized by external gaze palsy

Duane's syndrome
- Other names: DRS
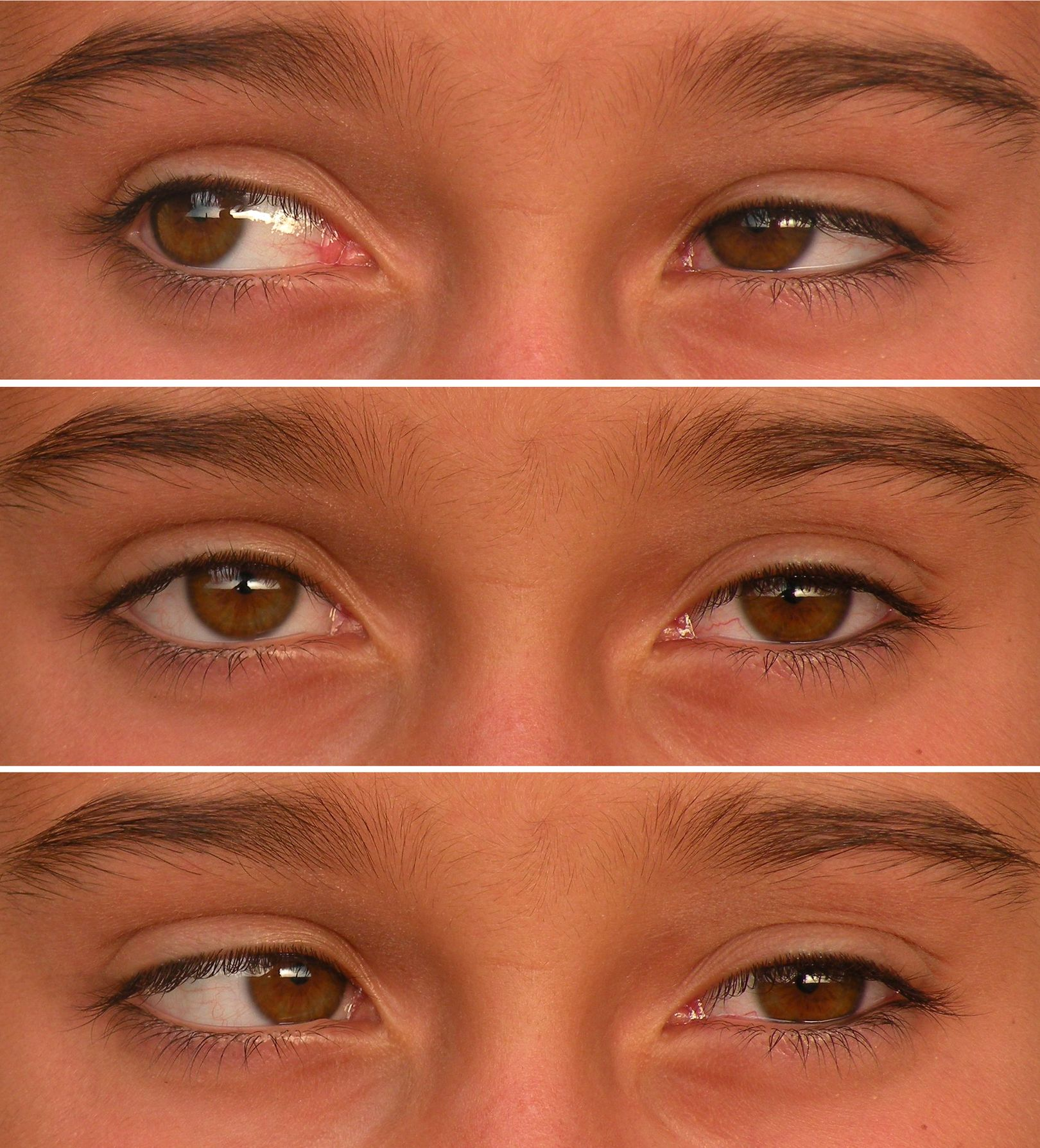
- Duane Syndrome type I in left eye. 10-year-old girl.
- Specialty: Ophthalmology, genetics

Duane syndrome is a congenital rare type of strabismus most commonly characterized by the inability of the eye to move outward. The syndrome was first described by ophthalmologists Jakob Stilling (1887) and Siegmund Türk (1896), and subsequently named after Alexander Duane, who discussed the disorder in more detail in 1905.

Other names for this condition include: Duane's retraction syndrome, eye retraction syndrome, retraction syndrome, congenital retraction syndrome and Stilling-Türk-Duane syndrome.

== Presentation ==
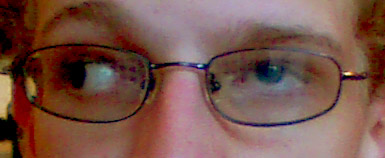
Patient with Duane syndrome attempting to look far right. Notice the affected left eye faces straight and up, rather than following the right eye to the right.

The characteristic features of the syndrome are:

- Limitation of abduction (outward movement) of the affected eye.
- Less marked limitation of adduction (inward movement) of the same eye.
- Retraction of the eyeball into the socket on adduction, with associated narrowing of the palpebral fissure (eye closing).
- Widening of the palpebral fissure on attempted abduction. (N. B. Mein and Trimble point out that this is "probably of no significance" as the phenomenon also occurs in other conditions in which abduction is limited.)
- Poor convergence.
- A head turn to the side of the affected eye to compensate for the movement limitations of the eye(s) and to maintain binocular vision.

While usually isolated to the eye abnormalities, Duane syndrome can be associated with other problems including cervical spine abnormalities Klippel–Feil syndrome, Goldenhar syndrome, heterochromia, and congenital deafness.

== Causes ==
Duane syndrome is most probably a miswiring of the eye muscles, causing some eye muscles to contract when they shouldn't and other eye muscles not to contract when they should. Alexandrakis and Saunders found that in most cases the abducens nucleus and nerve are absent or hypoplastic, and the lateral rectus muscle is innervated by a branch of the oculomotor nerve. This view is supported by the earlier work of Hotchkiss et al. who reported on the autopsy findings of two patients with Duane's syndrome. In both cases the sixth cranial nerve nucleus and nerve was absent, and the lateral rectus muscle was innervated by the inferior division of the third oculomotor nerve. This misdirection of nerve fibres results in opposing muscles being innervated by the same nerve. Thus, on attempted abduction, stimulation of the lateral rectus via the oculomotor nerve will be accompanied by stimulation of the opposing medial rectus via the same nerve; a muscle which works to adduct the eye. Thus, co-contraction of the muscles takes place, limiting the amount of movement achievable and also resulting in retraction of the eye into the socket. They also noticed mechanical factors and considered them secondary to loss of innervation: During corrective surgery fibrous attachments have been found connecting the horizontal recti and the orbital walls and fibrosis of the lateral rectus has been confirmed by biopsy. This fibrosis can result in the lateral rectus being 'tight' and acting as a tether or leash. Co-contraction of the medial and lateral recti allows the globe to slip up or down under the tight lateral rectus producing the up and down shoots characteristic of the condition.

== Genetics ==
There are two known genetic associations with Duane Syndrome. In some families the condition is associated with variants in the Chimerin 1 gene and in others it is associated with variants in the Transcription factor MafB gene.

== Diagnosis ==
=== Classification ===
Duane's syndrome has three variants:

- Type I: Limited abduction with or without esotropia
- Type II: Limited adduction with or without exotropia
- Type III: Limitation of both abduction and adduction and any form of horizontal strabismus

Brown(1950) has classified Duane's syndrome according to the characteristics of the limitation of movement-

- Type A: with limited abduction and less-marked limitation of adduction
- Type B: showing limited abduction but normal adduction
- Type C: the limitation of adduction exceeds the limitation of abduction. There is an exotropic deviation and a head turn to compensate the loss of adduction

The first type is more common and accounts for 85% of the cases.

=== Differential diagnosis ===
In the clinical setting, the principal difficulties in differential diagnosis arise as a consequence of the very early age at which patients with this condition first present. The clinician must be persistent in examining abduction and adduction, and in looking for any associated palpebral fissure changes or head postures, when attempting to determine whether what often presents as a common childhood squint (note-"squint" is a British term for two eyes not looking in the same direction) is in fact Duane syndrome. Fissure changes, and the other associated characteristics of Duane's such as up or down shoots and globe retraction, are also vital when deciding whether any abduction limitation is the result of Duane's and not a consequence of VI or abducens cranial nerve palsy.

Acquired Duane's syndrome is a rare event occurring after peripheral nerve palsy.

== Treatment ==
The majority of patients remain symptom free and able to maintain binocularity with only a slight face turn. Amblyopia is uncommon and, where present, rarely dense. This can be treated with occlusion, and any refractive error can also be corrected.

Duane syndrome cannot be cured, as the "missing" cranial nerve cannot be replaced, and traditionally there has been no expectation that surgery will result in any increase in the range of eye movement. Surgical intervention, therefore, has only been recommended where the patient is unable to maintain binocularity, where they are experiencing symptoms, or where they are forced to adopt a cosmetically unsightly or uncomfortable head posture in order to maintain binocularity. The aims of surgery are to place the eye in a more central position and, thus, place the field of binocularity more centrally also, and to overcome or reduce the need for the adoption of an abnormal head posture. Occasionally, surgery is not needed during childhood, but becomes appropriate later in life, as head position changes (presumably due to progressive muscle contracture).

Surgical approaches include:

- Medial rectus recession in the involved eye or both eyes. By weakening the medial rectus muscles this procedure improves the crossed-eye appearance but does not improve outward eye movements (abductions).
- Morad et al. showed improved abduction after modest unilateral medial rectus recession and lateral rectus resection in a subgroup of patients with mild eye retraction and good adduction before surgery.
- Lateral transposition of the vertical muscles described by Rosenbaum has been shown to improve range of movement of the eye. The surgical procedure produces 40-65 degrees of binocular field. Orbital wall fixation of the lateral rectus muscle (muscle is disinserted and reattached to lateral orbital wall) is recommended an effective method to inactivate a lateral rectus muscle in cases of marked anomalous innervation and severe cocontraction.

== Epidemiology ==
Most patients are diagnosed by the age of 10 years and Duane's is more common in girls (60 percent of the cases) than boys (40 percent of the cases). A French study reports that this syndrome accounts for 1.9% of the population of strabismic patients, 53.5% of patients are female, is unilateral in 78% of cases, and the left eye (71.9%) is affected more frequently than the right. Around 10–20% of cases are familial; these are more likely to be bilateral than non-familial Duane syndrome. Duane syndrome has no particular race predilection.

== See also ==
- Pediatric ophthalmology
