= Charles Windolph =

US Army soldier (1851–1950)

Charles A. Windolph
- Born: December 9, 1851; Bergen, Kingdom of Hanover, German Confederation
- Died: March 11, 1950 (aged 98)
- Burial place: Black Hills National Cemetery
- Spouse(s): Mary Jones (m. 1882; died 1883) Mathilda Lulow
- Military career
- Allegiance: United States
- Branch: United States Army
- Service years: 1871–1883
- Rank: Sergeant
- Unit: 7th U.S. Cavalry
- Conflicts: Battle of the Little Bighorn
- Awards: Medal of Honor; Purple Heart

Charles A. Windolph (December 9, 1851 – March 11, 1950) was a soldier in Company H of George Armstrong Custer's Seventh U.S. Cavalry who survived the Battle of the Little Bighorn and was the recipient of the Medal of Honor.

== Early life ==
Windolph was born in Bergen an der Dumme, Hanover, in the German Confederation December 9, 1851, to Joseph and Adelphina Koch Windolph. He arrived in the United States in 1871.

== Military career ==
Windolph enlisted in the army's 2nd US Infantry November 12, 1871. He deserted July 18, 1872, and promptly reenlisted as Charles Wrangel in 7th US Cavalry July 23, 1872. He later surrendered and was restored to duty without punishment. He was a shoemaker and did cobbler work among his comrades. He was a participant in the Yellowstone Expedition of 1873 and the Black Hills Expedition in 1874.

Windolph took part in the Reno-Benteen hilltop action at the Battle of Little Bighorn and was wounded in the buttock. He later received the Medal of Honor for his actions during that fight, specifically for providing covering fire for his comrades, including Medal of Honor recipient Peter Thompson), who went for water for the wounded on June 26, 1876. Windolph was also awarded the Purple Heart many years later. He was discharged in 1883 as a Sergeant. Like Thompson, he moved to Lead, Dakota Territory and took a job with the Homestake Mine, where he worked for 49 years. Windolph married twice and had three children. He was the source and subject of a book I Fought With Custer, The Story of Sergeant Windolph written by Frazier & Robert Hunt, published in 1947.

== Personal life ==
Windolph first married in 1882 to Mary Jones who died in 1883. He later married a childhood friend, Mathilda Lulow. Mathilda Lulow was born ca. 1861 on the Isle of Rugen to Karl Christian Christoph Lulow and Marie Sophia Henrietta Kagelmacher. Mathilda died on 23 March 1924 and is buried with her husband in the Black Hills National Cemetery. He died in 1950 at age 98, the last of the white participants in the Battle of the Little Bighorn. His remains were interred in the Black Hills National Cemetery.

== Medal of Honor citation ==
Rank and organization: Private, Company H, 7th U.S. Cavalry. Place and date: At Little Big Horn, Mont., June 25–26, 1876. Entered service at: Brooklyn, N.Y. Born: December 9, 1851, Germany. Date of issue: October 5, 1878.

Citation

With 3 comrades, during the entire engagement, courageously held a position that secured water for the command.

== See also ==
- List of Medal of Honor recipients
- List of Medal of Honor recipients for the Indian Wars
