= Frank Tolan =

- Born: May 1854; Malone, New York, United States
- Died: 1899
- Military career
- Allegiance: United States of America
- Branch: United States Army
- Service years: 1875–c. 1880
- Rank: Private
- Unit: 7th U.S. Cavalry
- Conflicts: Indian Wars; Great Sioux War of 1876–77
- Awards: Medal of Honor

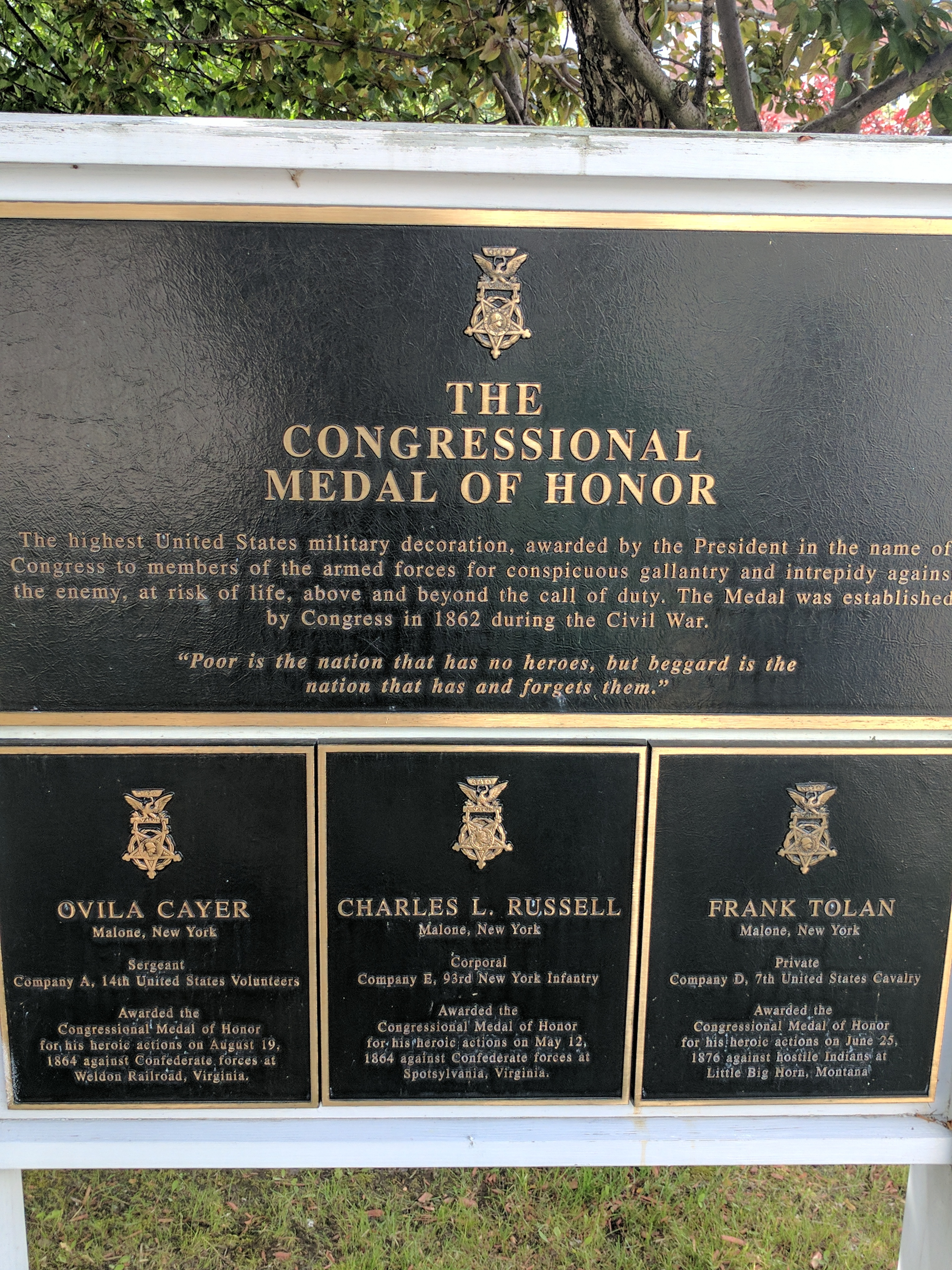
Memorial honoring Tolan in Malone, New York

Frank Tolan (May 1854 – 1899) was an American private in the U.S. Army who served with the 7th U.S. Cavalry during the Great Sioux War of 1876–77. He was one of twenty-two soldiers received the Medal of Honor for gallantry, volunteering to carry water to wounded soldiers on Reno Hill, at the Battle of the Little Bighorn on June 25, 1876.

== Biography ==
Tolan was born in Malone, New York in May 1854 and spent much of his early life as a farmer. At age 21, he enlisted in the United States Army in Boston, Massachusetts as a private with the 7th U.S. Cavalry Regiment on August 31, 1875.

Tolan saw action in the Montana Territory during the Great Sioux War of 1876–77 and, on June 25, 1876, was present at the Battle of the Little Bighorn against Chief Sitting Bull and the Sioux. A member of Company D under Captain Thomas Weir, he and several other soldiers volunteered to carry water from the Little Bighorn River to wounded soldiers at the Reno-Benteen site "under a most galling fire". He and the other Little Bighorn water carriers were among the twenty-two soldiers recommended for the Medal of Honor, Tolan officially receiving his award on October 5, 1878.>

Although disappearing from record soon after his discharge around 1880, the Boston Globe reported in 1887 that its military editor was in possession of Tolan's MOH which "was obtained by a comrade from a squaw".

== Medal of Honor citation ==
Rank and organization: Private, Company D, 7th U.S. Cavalry. Place and date: At Little Big Horn, Mont., 25 June 1876. Entered service at: Boston, Mass. Birth: Malone, N.Y. Date of issue: 5 October 1878.

Citation:

Voluntarily brought water to the wounded under fire.

== See also ==
- List of Medal of Honor recipients for the Indian Wars
