= Charles L. Russell =

- Born: c. 1844; Malone, New York, United States
- Died: June 7, 1910
- Burial place: Hot Springs National Cemetery, Hot Springs, South Dakota
- Military career
- Allegiance: United States of America
- Branch: United States Army
- Rank: Corporal
- Unit: 93rd New York Volunteer Infantry
- Conflicts: American Civil War; Battle of Spotsylvania Court House
- Awards: Medal of Honor

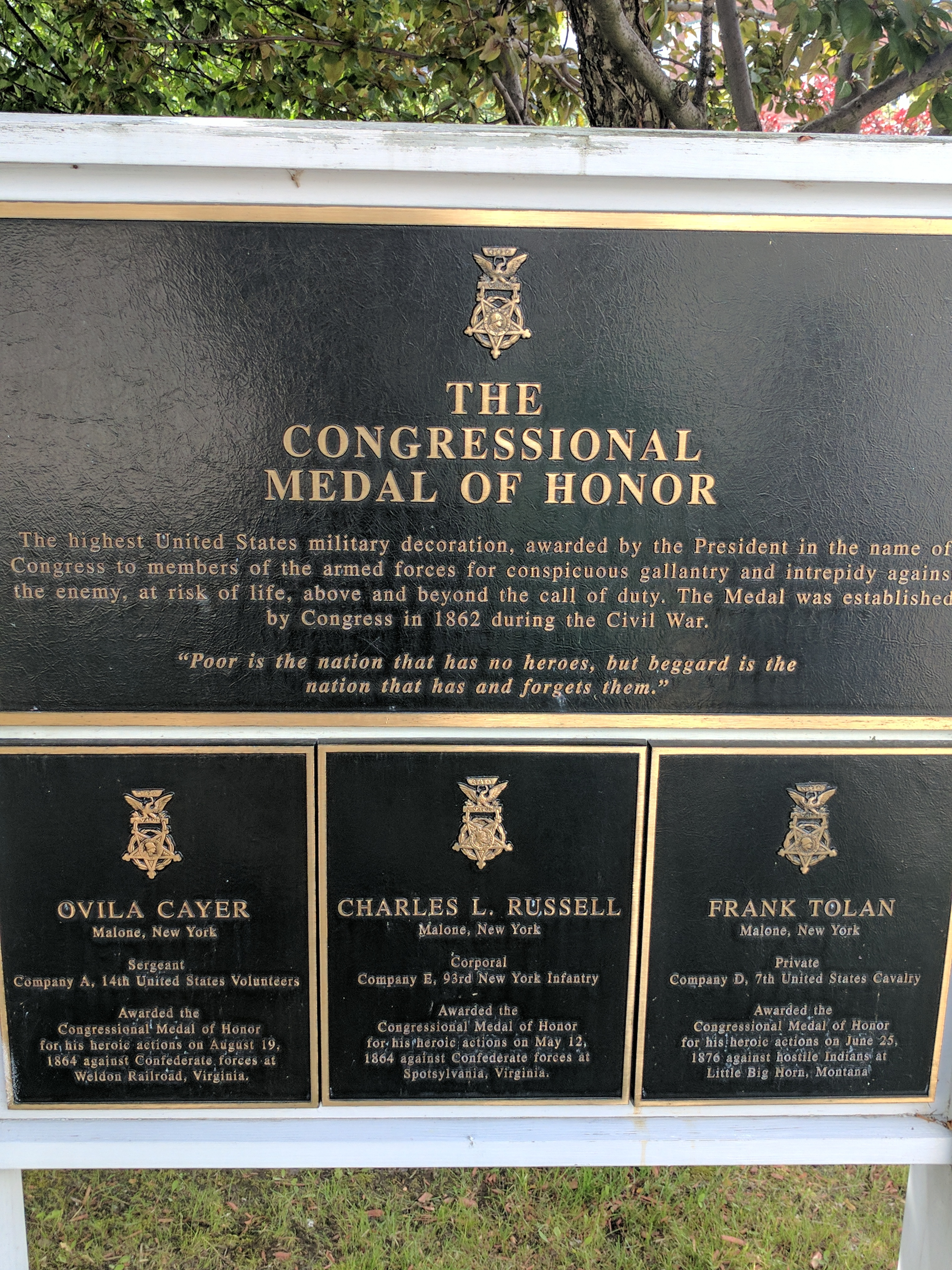
A plaque honoring Russell in Malone, New York

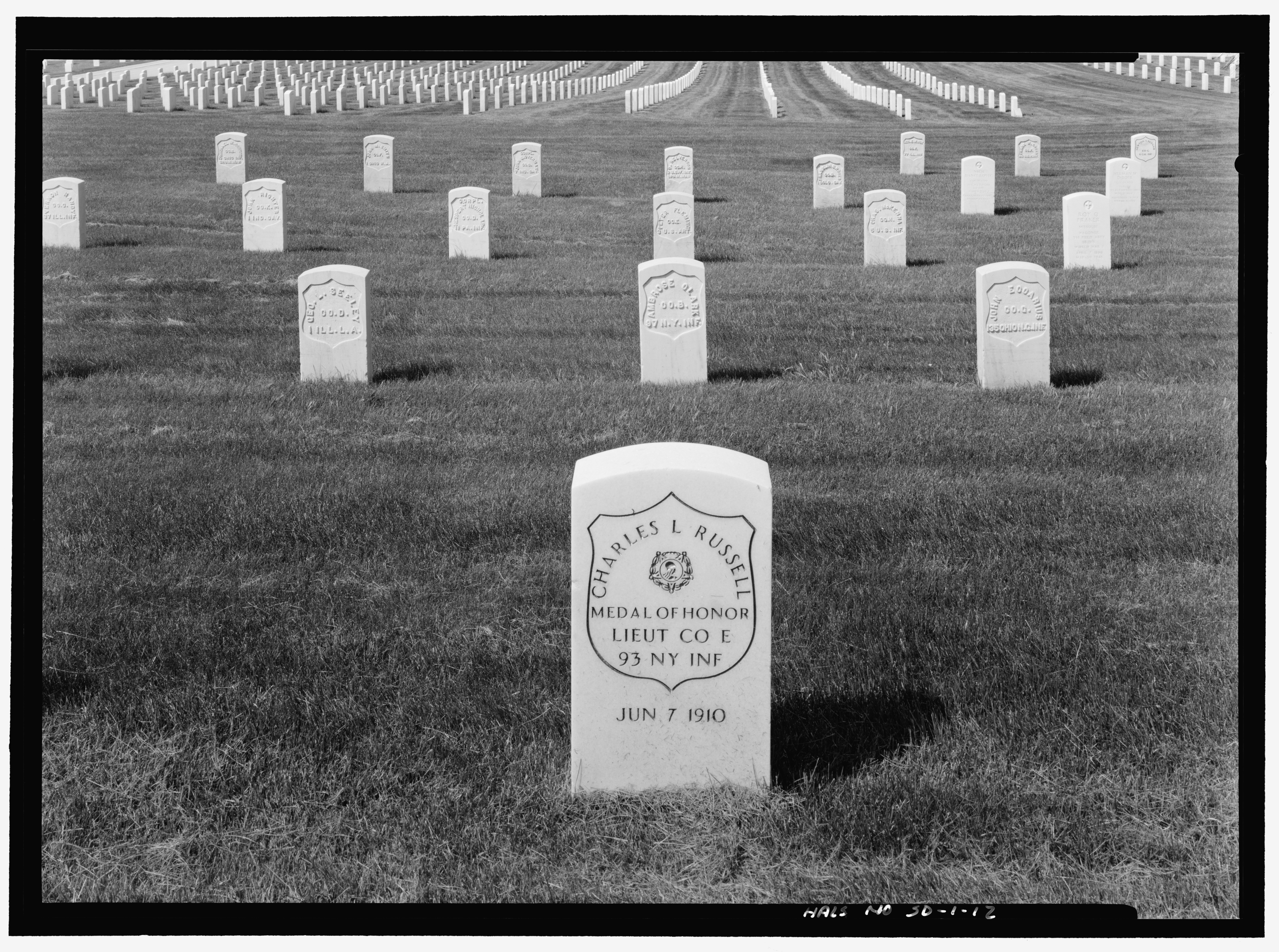
Russell's grave at Hot Springs National Cemetery

Charles L. Russell (c. 1844 – June 7, 1910) was an American Corporal in the U.S. Army who served with the 93rd New York Volunteer Infantry during the American Civil War. He received the Medal of Honor for extraordinary heroism after capturing the flag of the 42nd Virginia Infantry during the Battle of Spotsylvania Court House. He received the Medal of Honor on December 1, 1864.

== Biography ==
Russell was born in Malone, New York in about 1844 and served in the United States Army during the American Civil War. Following the war, he died and was buried at the Hot Springs National Cemetery in Hot Springs, South Dakota.
