= Alexander Duane =

American ophthalmologist (1858–1926)

Alexander Duane (September 1, 1858 – June 10, 1926) was an American ophthalmologist who was a native of Malone, New York.

He studied medicine at the College of Physicians and Surgeons (today the medical school of Columbia University). In 1881 he became an intern at the New York Hospital under German-born ophthalmologist Hermann Jakob Knapp (1832–1911), and in 1884 started his ophthalmological practice in New York. He was with the U.S. Navy during the Spanish–American War and World War I (one), and for a brief period of time taught classes at Cornell University.

Alexander Duane is remembered for contributions made in the study of the eye and vision, including aspects such as refraction, accommodation and squint. He also performed extensive analysis involving movement of the extraocular muscles. In 1897 he published a highly regarded treatise titled "A new classification of the motor anomalies of the eye".

Duane translated Austrian ophthalmologist Ernst Fuchs' ophthalmic textbook, which first appeared in English in 1903 under the title of "Fuchs Textbook of Ophthalmology", and ran for eight editions. Duane's name is associated with a few medical eponyms, including "Duane's parallax test", "Duane's retraction syndrome" and "Duane's prism test for latent squint".
