= Flanagan Hotel (Malone, New York) =

Hotel in Malone, New York

Coordinates: 44°50′56.9″N 74°17′31.2″W

The Flanagan Hotel in Malone, New York was built in 1917, and is the second hotel of this name to be located on the corner of East Main street and Elm Street in the Village of Malone. The Flanagan family owned a much smaller hotel at this location which was founded in 1857. The older hotel was a meeting place during the historical Fenian Raids. The current building is still the largest building in the historic downtown of Malone. In the Flanagan's heyday it was said by locals and travelers alike that it was the largest hotel north of Albany, New York. The hotel suffered a fire in 1997 supposedly started by someone falling asleep while smoking on their bed in their hotel room. The building from the fire, in 1997, to 2007 was undisturbed. The Flanagan is thought to be an eyesore by many while others see it as a link to Malone's prominent and historical past started the aggressive campaigns of William A. Wheeler to bring the New York Central and Rutland Railroads to town.

Various plans of varying feasibility or realistic financial backing for the building were floated but never materialized in the years after the property was foreclosed upon in 2009. Ideas included renovation to become a 5 star Best Western Hotel with multiple restaurants, a night club, and a pool on the Roof.

Other proposed options involved a scaled down budget by 4 million dollars, breaking the plans up into 3 smaller and more economically feasible separate projects. There was also discussion of turning the Flanagan in to college dorms for North Country Community College. NCCC held community art exhibits in the partially renovated building while plans were discussed for the future of the structure.

In 2025 the town decided to take bids for the demolition of the building, scheduled to begin in April, 2026.

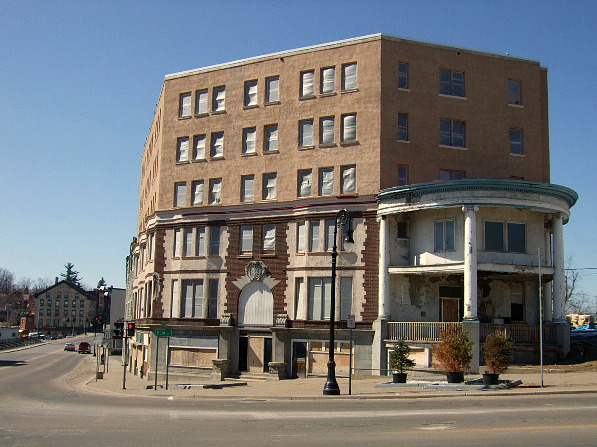
The Flanagan Hotel in 2012
