= Merrillsville Cure Cottage =

Historic house in New York, United States

- U.S. National Register of Historic Places
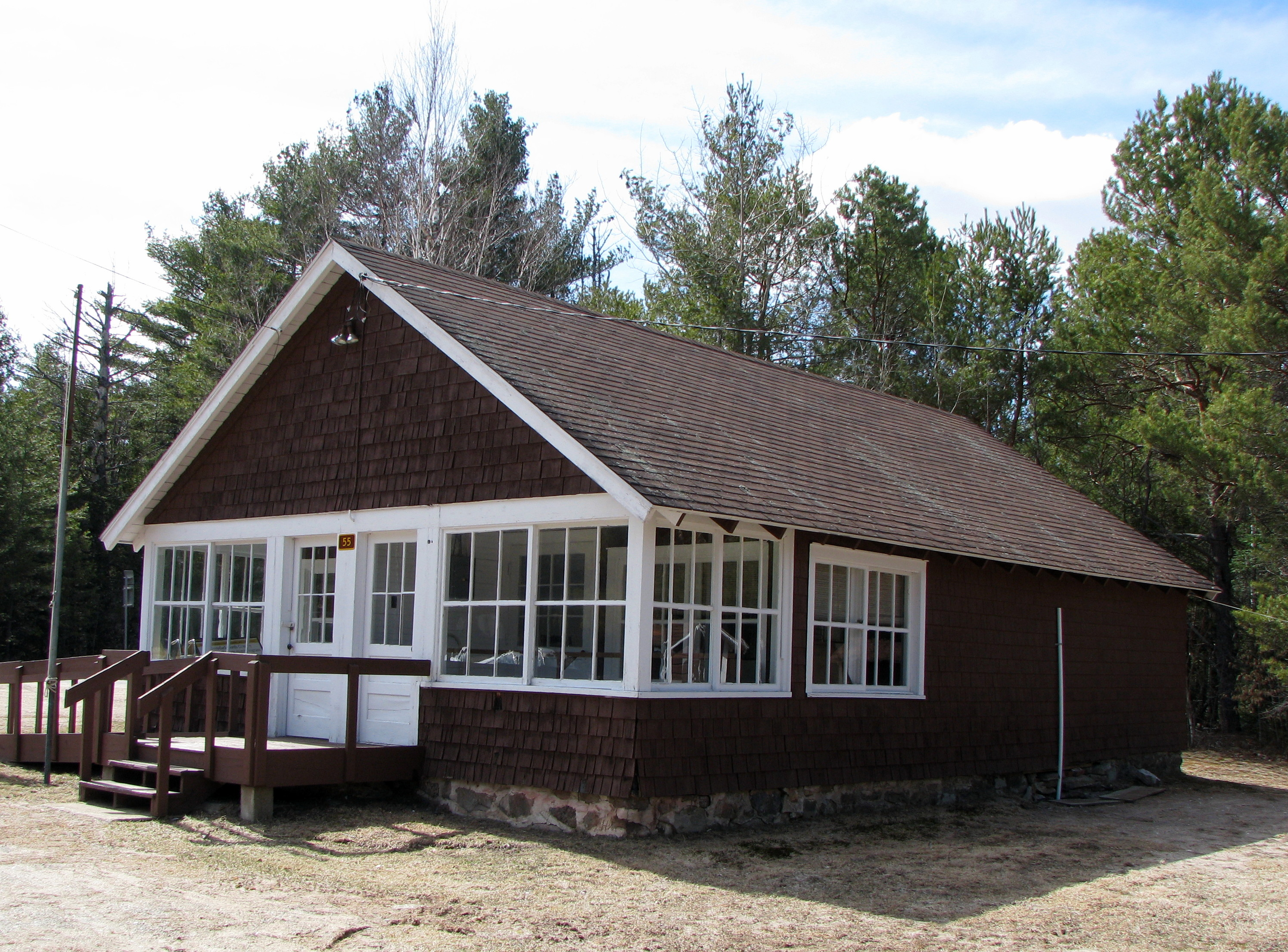
- Merrillsville Cure Cottage, April 2009

- Location within New York Location within the United States
- Location: Jct. of Co. Rt. 99 and Old NY 3, Merrillsville, New York
- Coordinates: 44°31′18″N 74°0′52″W
- Area: 1 acre (0.40 ha)
- Built: 1900
- NRHP reference No.: 95000947
- Added to NRHP: August 10, 1995

Merrillsville Cure Cottage, also known as Merrillsville Town Hall, is a historic cure cottage located at Merrillsville in the town of Franklin, Franklin County, New York. It was built about 1900 as part of a tuberculosis curing facility that also included a main lodge and numerous tent platform. It was moved to its present site in 1920. It is a small, rectangular one story frame building, sheathed in dark brown cedar shingles. It is topped by a gable roof with exposed wooden rafters. It features a full-width, glass-enclosed cure porch.

It was listed on the National Register of Historic Places in 1995.
