= Loon Lake Mountains =

Mountains in New York, United States

- Location within New York Adirondack Park Location within the United States

Highest point
- Elevation: 3,311 feet (1,009 m)
- Coordinates: 44°33′31″N 74°09′08″W, 44°33′24″N 74°06′47″W

Geography
- Location: Franklin County, New York, U.S.
- Topo map(s): USGS Debar Mountain, Loon Lake

Loon Lake Mountains are a pair of mountains, the tallest being 3,311-foot-tall (1,009 m), near Loon Lake in Franklin County, New York. On the summit is the Loon Lake Mountain Fire Observation Station, which was added to the National Register of Historic Places in 2015.

For a long time, Loon Lake Mountain was closed to the public and only accessible via rough terrain, but a 5.9 mile round-trip trail was opened to the public in 2013 and is being maintained by the New York Department of Environmental Conservation.
