= Brandon, New York =

- Town
- Location within the state of New York
- Coordinates: 44°45′6″N 74°25′39″W
- Country: United States
- State: New York
- County: Franklin
- Named for: Brandon, Vermont

Government
  - Type: Town Council
  - Town Supervisor: Michael Lawrence (R)
  - Town Council: Members' List: • Ronald Goyea (R); • Kenneth Fish (R); • Gary Gonia (D); • Randy French ()

Area
  - Total: 41.32 sq mi (107.03 km^{2})
  - Land: 41.26 sq mi (106.85 km^{2})
  - Water: 0.066 sq mi (0.17 km^{2})
- Elevation: 1,368 ft (417 m)

Population (2010)
  - Total: 577
  - Estimate (2016): 566
  - Density: 14/sq mi (5.3/km^{2})
- Time zone: UTC-5 (Eastern (EST))
  - Summer (DST): UTC-4 (EDT)
- ZIP Code: 12966 (North Bangor)
- FIPS code: 36-033-07839
- GNIS feature ID: 0978748

Brandon is a town in Franklin County, New York, United States. It is centrally located in the county, southwest of Malone. The town population was 577 at the 2010 census. It was named after Brandon, Vermont, by early settlers.

== History ==
The town was settled by pioneers from Vermont. The town of Brandon was organized in 1828 from the town of Bangor. Subsequently, the town lost much of its area in the formation of the towns of Harrietstown and Santa Clara.

== Geography ==
According to the United States Census Bureau, Brandon has a total area of 41.32 square miles (107.02 km^{2}), of which 41.26 square miles (106.85 km^{2}) is land and 0.066 square miles (0.17 km^{2}), or 0.16%, is water.

The southern town line borders the Adirondack Park.

== Demographics ==
Historical population
Census	Pop.	Note	%±
1830	316		—
1840	531		68.0%
1850	590		11.1%
1860	794		34.6%
1870	692		−12.8%
1880	815		17.8%
1890	892		9.4%
1900	938		5.2%
1910	872		−7.0%
1920	728		−16.5%
1930	516		−29.1%
1940	489		−5.2%
1950	357		−27.0%
1960	369		3.4%
1970	333		−9.8%
1980	499		49.8%
1990	394		−21.0%
2000	542		37.6%
2010	577		6.5%
2016 (est.)	566		−1.9%
U.S. Decennial Census

As of the census of 2000, there were 542 people, 195 households, and 150 families residing in the town. The population density was 13.1 inhabitants per square mile (5.1/km^{2}). There were 309 housing units at an average density of 7.5 per square mile (2.9/km^{2}). The racial makeup of the town was 95.94% White, 0.18% African American, 1.66% Native American, 0.55% Asian, 0.74% from other races, and 0.92% from two or more races. Hispanic or Latino of any race were 1.48% of the population.

There were 195 households, out of which 39.5% had children under the age of 18 living with them, 60.0% were married couples living together, 6.7% had a female householder with no husband present, and 22.6% were non-families. 15.9% of all households were made up of individuals, and 4.1% had someone living alone who was 65 years of age or older. The average household size was 2.74 and the average family size was 2.99.

In the town, the population was spread out, with 28.4% under the age of 18, 5.9% from 18 to 24, 33.8% from 25 to 44, 22.1% from 45 to 64, and 9.8% who were 65 years of age or older. The median age was 36 years. For every 100 females, there were 107.7 males. For every 100 females age 18 and over, there were 106.4 males.

The median income for a household in the town was $28,500, and the median income for a family was $27,361. Males had a median income of $30,809 versus $21,053 for females. The per capita income for the town was $13,663. About 16.4% of families and 22.7% of the population were below the poverty line, including 25.4% of those under age 18 and 20.4% of those age 65 or over.

== Communities and locations in Brandon ==
- Brandon Center – A hamlet in the northern part of the town. It is located at the junction of Town House Road and French Road.
- Deer River – A stream flowing past Reynoldston; part of the St. Regis River watershed.
- Reynoldston – A hamlet on County Road 15 (Reynoldston Road) in the western part of the town. The name is from members of the Reynolds family who operated the Reynolds Mill and Logging operations from 1870 to 1925 and were prominent in the community development. The community is documented by a website that discusses life in the community from 1870 to 1970 and the role of the Reynolds Bros.
- Salmon River – A stream flowing northward on the east side of Brandon; flows north to the St. Lawrence River in Canada.
- Skerry – A hamlet east of Brandon Center at the junction of County Roads 12 and 13.
