= Tent pad =

Site for setting up a tent

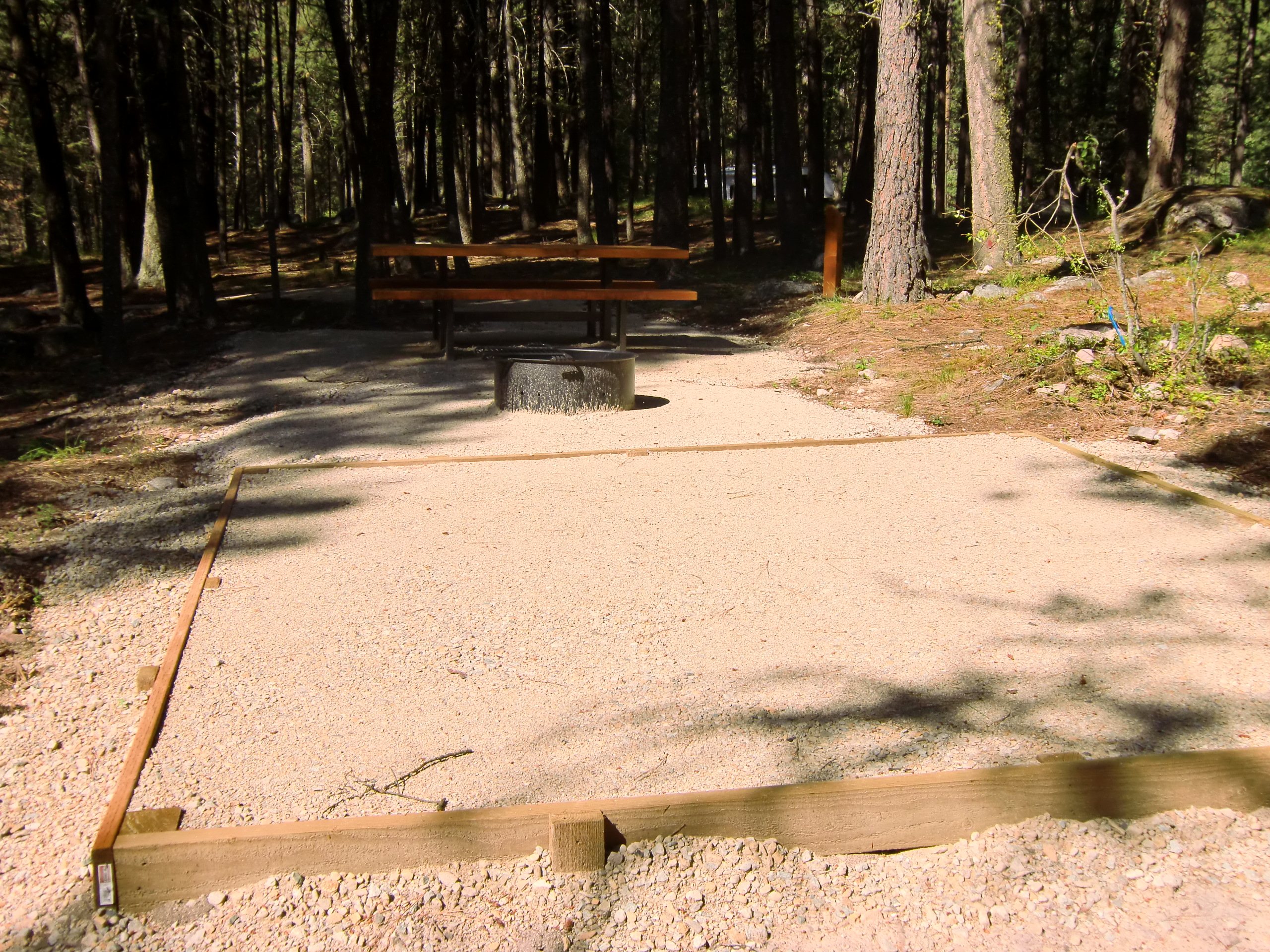
A tent pad

A tent pad is a designated area at a campground site to a set up a tent. It eliminates the need to find a suitable spot to pitch a tent.

Often, a tent pad is a single row of timbers forming a square that retains the fill, resembling a sandbox. In addition to wood, it can also be framed with cement or other material. The framing allows the tent pad to be even and level on rough or sloping terrain and allows for more comfortable sleeping. Some tent pads do not have framing, but instead are raised area of dirt that are sometimes topped with wood chips. An open grassy area does not constitute a tent pad.

Furthermore, a tent pad is often elevated about 10 to 15 cm (4 to 6 in). This elevation also prevents standing water from developing and reduces the risk of flooding when it rains since it has better drainage.

The tent pad also makes it easier to stake a tent since there are no large rocks or tree roots in the fill. The fill can be composed of sandy soil, dirt, gravel, sand and gravel mix, mulch, cement, or river rock.

Tent pads can come in a variety of sizes depending on the type of camping (e.g. backpacking, leisure camping) or region of the country. There are no standard dimensions, but commons sizes include 2.4 m × 2.4 m (8 ft × 8 ft), 3.0 m × 3.0 m (10 ft × 10 ft), 3.7 m × 3.7 m (12 ft × 12 ft), and 4.6 m × 4.6 m (15 ft × 15 ft). Some are oversized, greater than 4.6 m × 4.6 m (15 ft × 15 ft), designed to accommodate a large family tent.

A campsite may have a designated tent pad, but otherwise a flat, durable surface like dirt or gravel would be a suitable alternative. Having a designated tent pad can help prevent damage to the vegetation of the area from staking or setting up the tents in other areas of the campsite.

Tent pads are most often found at developed campgrounds but can also be found in primitive and even wilderness campsites.

Tent pads need to be maintained, otherwise erosion can occur and cause slopes and/or water channels to form.

== See also ==
- Tent platform, a floor for the purpose of pitching one or more tents upon
