= Franklin, Franklin County, New York =

Franklin, New York
- Town
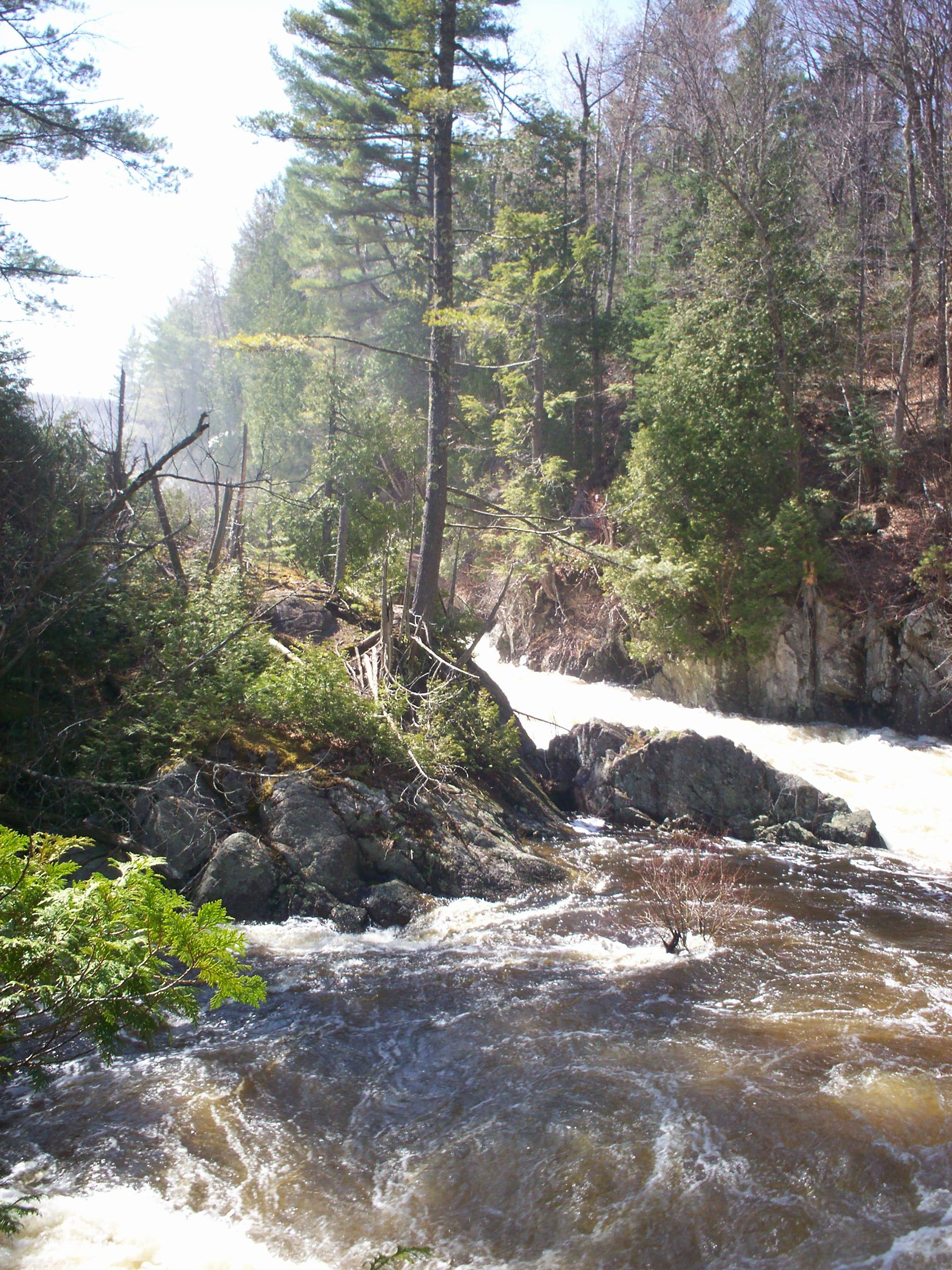
- Franklin Falls on the Saranac River in the spring

- Location within the state of New York Franklin (the United States)
- Coordinates: 44°31′9″N 74°3′38″W
- Country: United States
- State: New York
- County: Franklin
- Named after: Benjamin Franklin

Government
  - Type: Town Council
  - Town Supervisor: Arthur P. Willman, Jr. (R)
  - Town Council: Members' List: • Clifford Smalley (D); • Allen Berg (R); • Donald M. Hamm (R); • Bradley L. Merrill (R)

Area
  - Total: 175.22 sq mi (453.82 km^{2})
  - Land: 169.83 sq mi (439.85 km^{2})
  - Water: 5.39 sq mi (13.97 km^{2})
- Elevation: 1,693 ft (516 m)

Population (2010)
  - Total: 1,140
  - Estimate (2016): 1,136
  - Density: 6.7/sq mi (2.58/km^{2})
- Time zone: UTC-5 (Eastern (EST))
  - Summer (DST): UTC-4 (EDT)
- ZIP Codes: 12989 (Vermontville); 12913 (Bloomingdale); 12981 (Saranac); 12983 (Saranac Lake)
- FIPS code: 36-27243
- GNIS feature ID: 0978971
- Website: www.townoffranklin.com

Franklin is a town located in Franklin County, New York, United States. As of the 2010 census, the town had a population of 1,140.

The town is in the southeastern part of the county, in the Adirondack Region of New York.

== History ==
The first settlement in the town was Franklin Falls (1827). This community burned in 1852.

The town of Franklin was founded in 1836 from part of the town of Bellmont. The town was used to relocate former slaves, in part the work of Gerrit Smith, an abolitionist, and in part the result of Civil War veterans inviting freed slaves to return home with them.

The Loon Lake Mountain Fire Observation Station was listed on the National Register of Historic Places in 2008.

== Geography ==
Franklin is the third-largest town in Franklin County. According to the United States Census Bureau, the town has a total area of 175.2 square miles (453.8 km^{2}), of which 169.8 square miles (439.8 km^{2}) is land and 5.4 square miles (14.0 km^{2}), or 3.08%, is water. The Saranac River, a tributary of Lake Champlain, flows through the southeastern corner of the town.

Franklin is in the Adirondack Park. The eastern town line is the border of Clinton County, and the southern town boundary is the border of Essex County.

New York State Route 3 runs diagonally from southwest to northeast across Franklin. Saranac Lake is 15 miles (24 km) to the southwest, and Plattsburgh is 34 miles (55 km) to the northeast. Malone, the Franklin County seat, is 34 miles (55 km) to the northwest via County Road 26 and NY Route 30.

== Demographics ==
Historical population
| Census | Pop. | Note | %± |
|---|---|---|---|
| 1840 | 192 | | — |
| 1850 | 724 | | 277.1% |
| 1860 | 1,105 | | 52.6% |
| 1870 | 1,195 | | 8.1% |
| 1880 | 1,184 | | −0.9% |
| 1890 | 1,345 | | 13.6% |
| 1900 | 1,501 | | 11.6% |
| 1910 | 1,447 | | −3.6% |
| 1920 | 1,280 | | −11.5% |
| 1930 | 1,242 | | −3.0% |
| 1940 | 1,002 | | −19.3% |
| 1950 | 872 | | −13.0% |
| 1960 | 695 | | −20.3% |
| 1970 | 550 | | −20.9% |
| 1980 | 926 | | 68.4% |
| 1990 | 1,016 | | 9.7% |
| 2000 | 1,197 | | 17.8% |
| 2010 | 1,140 | | −4.8% |
| 2016 (est.) | 1,136 | | −0.4% |
U.S. Decennial Census

As of the census of 2000, there were 1,197 people, 473 households, and 324 families residing in the town. The population density was 7.0 inhabitants per square mile (2.7/km^{2}). There were 982 housing units at an average density of 5.8 per square mile (2.2/km^{2}). The racial makeup of the town was 97.08% White, 0.50% African American, 1.34% Native American, 0.08% Asian, 0.17% from other races, and 0.84% from two or more races. Hispanic or Latino of any race were 0.42% of the population.

There were 473 households, out of which 34.5% had children under the age of 18 living with them, 57.7% were married couples living together, 7.2% had a female householder with no husband present, and 31.3% were non-families. 26.0% of all households were made up of individuals, and 11.0% had someone living alone who was 65 years of age or older. The average household size was 2.52 and the average family size was 3.04.

In the town, the population was spread out, with 27.2% under the age of 18, 5.4% from 18 to 24, 30.0% from 25 to 44, 24.1% from 45 to 64, and 13.2% who were 65 years of age or older. The median age was 40 years. For every 100 females, there were 102.9 males. For every 100 females age 18 and over, there were 101.2 males.

The median income for a household in the town was $40,598, and the median income for a family was $46,250. Males had a median income of $32,000 versus $23,472 for females. The per capita income for the town was $17,955. About 5.0% of families and 7.3% of the population were below the poverty line, including 4.6% of those under age 18 and 7.4% of those age 65 or over.

== Communities and locations in Franklin ==
- Alder Brook – A hamlet in the eastern part of the town, southeast of Sugarbush.
- Franklin Falls – A hamlet in the southeastern corner of the town on County Road 48, previously known as "McLenathan Falls."
- Forestdale – A hamlet in the southeastern corner of the town, east of Franklin Falls.
- Goldsmith – A hamlet in the eastern part of the town, located north of Sugarbush.
- Hunters Home – A former location in the town in its northeastern corner.
- Lake Kushaqua – A small lake near the state campground at Buck Pond.
- Loon Lake – A lake in the central part of the town by County Road 26.
- Loon Lake – A hamlet on the eastern side of Loon Lake, located on County Road 26.
- Merrillsville – A hamlet near the center of the Town of Franklin, southeast of Loon Lake on County Road 26. The Merrillsville Cure Cottage was listed on the National Register of Historic Places in 1995.
- Molasses Corners – A location on the northern side of Loon Lake on County Road 26.
- Onchiota – A hamlet in the southwestern part of the town on County Road 60.
- Rainbow Lake – A lake and hamlet partly in the western side of the town.
- Sugarbush – A hamlet on NY-3 near the eastern town line.
- Two Brooks – A hamlet near the eastern town line, north of Sugarbush.
- Union Falls – A hamlet at the eastern town line, mostly in Clinton County.
- Union Falls Pond – A lake north of Franklin Falls in the southeastern part of the town.
- Vermontville – A hamlet and seat of the town government. It is located near the southern town boundary on NY-3. It was named for the many settlers who had migrated from Vermont.
- White Fathers – A location southwest of Loon Lake, on Lake Kushaqua, now a ghost town. The name derives from the White Fathers of Africa, a Catholic missionary group. They bought the Stony Wold Sanitarium and in the late 1950s or early 1960s adapted it for use as a seminary to train priests. The Seminary was operated until the early 1970s, as was Camp Lavigerie during the summers.
