= Vermontville =

Vermontville may refer to a community in the United States:

- Vermontville, Michigan, a village
- Vermontville Township, Michigan
- Vermontville, New York, a hamlet
