= Bishop Bay – Monkey Beach Conservancy =

Protected natural area in British Columbia, Canada

- IUCN category II (national park)
- Location within British Columbia
- Location: Range 4 Coast Land District, British Columbia, Canada
- Nearest city: Kitimat, BC
- Coordinates: 53°28′01″N 128°55′26″W
- Area: 3,372 ha (8,330 acres)
- Established: July 13, 2006
- Governing body: Maryland Department of Natural Resources

Bishop Bay – Monkey Beach Conservancy is a conservancy in British Columbia, Canada. It is 3,374 hectares in size and is accessible only by floatplane or boat. It features boat anchorage and tent platforms as well as a hotspring fed bath house. The temperature of the hotsprings is approximately 41.3 degrees Celsius at the source and about 38.8 degrees Celsius in the bath house. It is located 25 km east of Hartley Bay and 75 km south of Kitimat. The conservancy was established in 2006, with Monkey Beach being added to the conservancy in 2007.

Another conservancy lies within the larger Bishop Bay – Monkey Beach Conservancy boundaries, titled Bishop Bay – Monkey Beach Corridor Conservancy. This wedge-shaped area was established in 2007 to allow construction of road access to timber harvest areas east of the larger conservancy boundaries.
