= Reynoldston, New York =

Former settlement in New York, United States

Coordinates: 44°44′35″N 74°26′59″W

Reynoldston is a former settlement in Upstate New York or sometimes referred to as Northern New York, United States. Located in the township of Brandon in Franklin County, Reynoldston sits along the Deer River at 1,258 feet (383 m) above sea level, or about 1,000 feet (300 m) above the St. Lawrence River Valley. It is in the northern foothills of the Adirondacks. At its peak, circa 1920, Reynoldston had fewer than 350 inhabitants.

== Early settlers ==
After the Civil War, men and women looking for land moved along the Eddy Road to what would become Reynoldston. Families such as Allen Bordeaux, Joseph Campbell, who served in the Civil War, and Nelson Trushaw. They cleared their lands, and earned hard cash by selling potash or "blacksalts" that they made as they burned the hardwood trees to build their farms. The first farms grew hops, raised sheep both for the wool and food and some had a few cows and oxen to plow their land. It was, at best, a type of subsistence farming. The land was too rocky, the summers were too short and the winters were too cold to sustain extensive agriculture which existed only a few miles away in the St. Lawrence Valley.

== Reynolds Bros. Mill and Logging ==
What Reynoldston did have was extensive mixed forests with both hardwood and softwood, the Deer River for water power to drive saws in a lumber mill and excellent conditions for logging in the winter. Orson and Phoebe Reynolds bought extensive land holdings and established the "Reynolds Mill" in the later 1870s. Initially the mill located on the banks of the Deer River(a tributary of Black River), logged the immediate area and processed the wood in their mill. The bounty of the hardwoods and of cedar for shakes kept the mill going. When Orson Reynolds died in 1887, his four sons took over the mill and soon expanded it under the new name Reynolds Brothers Mill and Logging.

== Forest history and the conservation movement ==
Reynoldston is an example in the forest history of the Adirondack Mountains and the rush to cut and process the forest wealth of this forestry rich region in the late 1800s, when logging was accelerating in the Adirondacks, At the same time there was an increasing public awareness of forest conservation in New York State. Cornell University attempted to establish a school of forestry, and pamphlets on reforestation first began to be distributed. Also in 1892 the New York State Legislature established the Adirondack State Park and Catskill State Park. It was the beginning of the conservation movement that would in time see much of the Adirondacks and Catskill Mountains reforested and protected. The history of the Adirondacks is well documented at the Adirondack Museum in Blue Mountain Lake, New York. New York Telephone Co

== Reynolds Telegraph and Telephone ==
One interesting side-bar to the Reynolds Brothers is that Frank Reynolds, starting in the early 1880s, established a telegraph line that soon served communities as far away as Owl's Head and St. Regis Falls. Then in 1887, he pioneered the establishment of the telephone for Brandon and several surrounding towns and soon Reynoldston was "central" for many of the nearby communities. In 1918 the phone company was sold the New York Telephone Co. In 1894, the name Reynoldston was born when he was able to establish a post office for the community.

== Population peaks at 350 residents ==
Reynoldston reached it peak from 1908 to 1918 when the Brooklyn Cooperage Company contracted the Reynolds Brothers to provide hardwood logs for making staves and barrel tops in St. Regis Falls. A logging railroad spur was built just south of Reynoldston near Mutton Ridge to allow the Reynolds Brothers to move the logs by train to St. Regis Falls. At is peak the Reynolds Bros. operated up to four logging camps with between 30 and 40 men working in each one. The community boomed providing work for more loggers and for many of the neighboring farms in the St Lawrence Valley, who provided teams for hauling logs. During this time, The Reynold's mill was only used on a limited basis. By 1918 the Reynolds Brothers had cut almost all the hardwood they owned on their more than 10,000 acres. Following this, the Reynolds Brothers were contracted to cut softwood for the Malone Paper Company and then proceeded to cut the remaining trees on their lands.

== Family demographics of Reynoldston ==
The families of Reynoldston represented a cross-section of the population of Northern New York State and included French–Canadians, Irish, Scottish, from New England backgrounds. Most of the residents were Roman Catholics although a number of them were of Protestant backgrounds. Some to the family names were -the Allen Bordeaux, Joseph Bombard, Alfred French, Jondro, Duso, William LaHares, Nelson Duso, Joseph Meno' and Philias and Henry Moquin, Oliver Trushaw- and had very large families of 10 or more children and as such probably made up a majority of the community early in the 20th century. In addition most of these families intermarried in subsequent generations – Campbells married Bordeauxs married Frenches married Bombards and LaHares. Living among them at various times throughout the community's history, however, were a significant number of English, Irish, or Scottish people, - often settlers from New England – William Collins, John Cox, Henry Clark, Danford Whitcomb, Arthur Berry, Joseph Campbells, James McGovern, Patterson, Samuel Trims, and Orson L. Reynolds. Again many of these families also married into other families in the community regardless of religious affiliation.

== Logging resources exhausted ==
By 1925, the Reynolds Brothers had cut most of the trees on their land holding, they started the process of closing the mill and shutting down their operations. Almost immediately families began to leave for work in other parts of Northern New York. Many of them including the Reynolds family kept some of the mill owned homes for summer camps. Members of a few of the larger families, the Bordeaux's and Campbell's remained in Reynoldston to farm, make maple syrup and work as guides and the State of New York. The one room school house closed in 1940/41. The history of Reynoldston was brief, but due to the very large extended families of more than a dozen children; consequently a large number people can trace their ancestry back to this small short lived community.

== Oral history project documents community ==
In 1969–1971, W. J. Langlois and Robert H. McGowan conducted oral history interviews with more than 20 individuals and created over sixty tapes on the history of the community. In addition more than 300 historical photographs were collected. Since then Langlois and McGowan have continued their research and collected additional photos and historical documentation on the community.
