= Skerry, New York =

Hamlet in New York, United States

Coordinates: 44°46′04″N 74°22′55″W

Skerry is a hamlet in the town of Brandon in Franklin County, New York, United States. It is located east of the Little Salmon River on Franklin County Highway 12 (Skerry Road) and Franklin County Highway 13 (Bangor Skerry Road). Skerry is 9 miles (14 km) southwest of Malone and 5 miles (8 km) southeast of West Bangor.

Originally, the community developed around a lumber mill and other small businesses. To the north of Skerry are a number of farms, while to the south are the foothills of the Adirondack Mountains and extensive hardwood and softwood forests that are part of the Deer River State Forests.

== History ==
Skerry, New York, developed in the mid to late 19th century, primarily serving the surrounding farms while growing into a small hamlet with various industries. The Bowen Sawmill operated for more than thirty years (see the account by Mrs. Alice Crooks, daughter of L. Cass Bowen, in an oral history interview in 1970). The mill, run by L. Cass Bowen, also maintained its own logging camps to supply timber, employing both mill workers and loggers.

An oral history interview conducted in 1970 with Mrs. Alice Crooks, the daughter of L. Cass Bowen, provides further insights into the Bowen Sawmill's importance to the community during its operation. In 1920, Reynolds Bros. acquired the mill and approximately 25 acres of land in Skerry. They continued operations until 1926, when a dam failure led to the closure of the mill and the end of the logging operations. The dam failure marked the end of an era for Skerry's lumber industry, leaving a lasting mark on the town's history.
