= Loon Lake Mountain Fire Observation Station =

- U.S. National Register of Historic Places
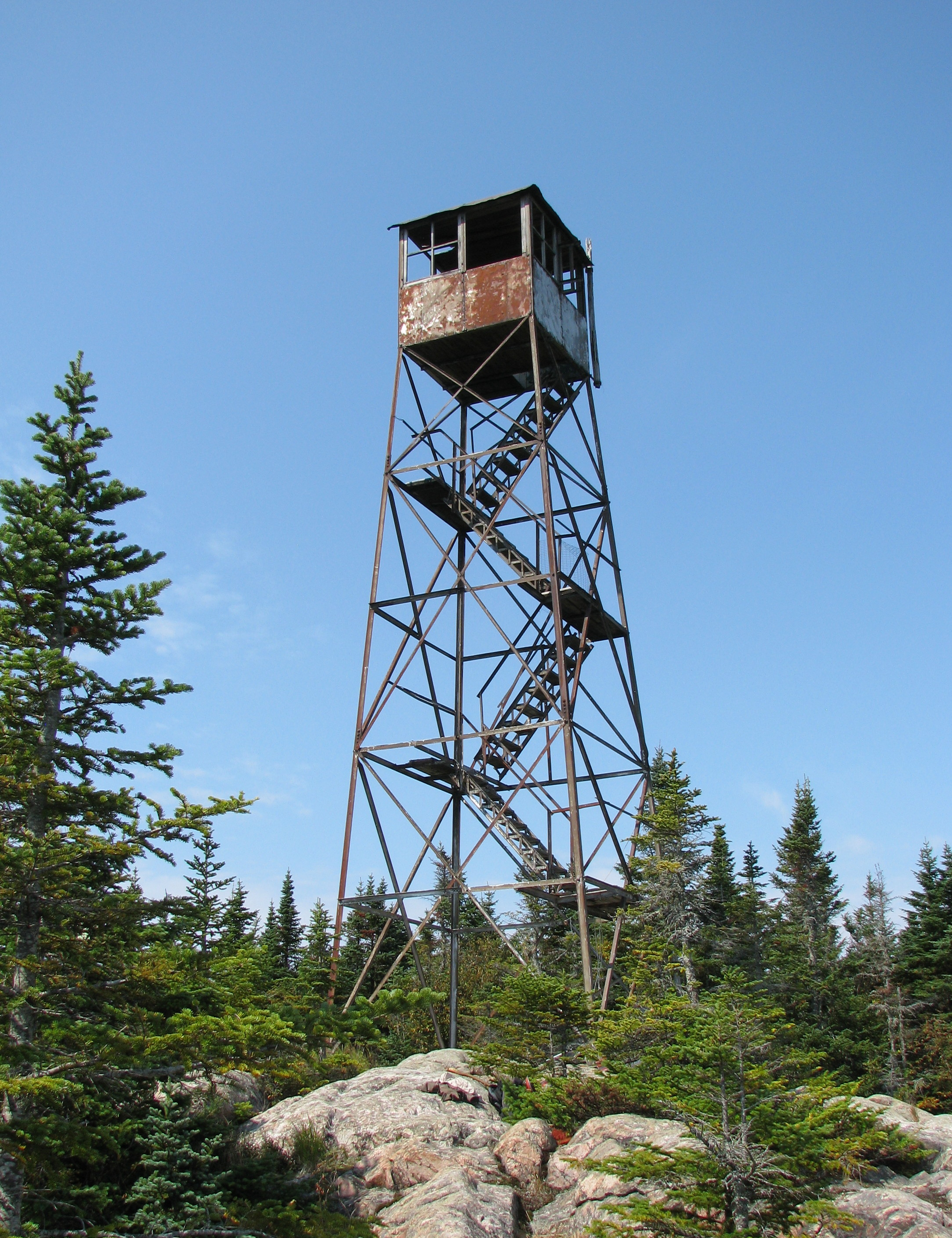
- Loon Lake Mountain Fire Observation Station, September 2012

- Location within New York Location within the United States
- Location: Summit of Loon Lake Mountain, Franklin, New York
- Coordinates: 44°33′29″N 74°9′6″W
- Area: less than 1 acre (0.4 ha)
- Built: 1917
- Architect: Aermotor Corporation
- Architectural style: Utilitarian/firetower
- MPS: Fire Observation Stations of New York State Forest Preserve MPS
- NRHP reference No.: 08001144
- Added to NRHP: December 5, 2008

The Loon Lake Mountain Fire Observation Station is a historic fire observation station located on the western end of the Loon Lake Mountains west of Loon Lake in Franklin County, New York in the Debar Mountain Wild Forest. The station and contributing resources include a 35-foot-tall (10.7 m), steel-frame lookout tower erected in 1917; it replaced a wooden fire tower that was constructed in 1912. The tower has been unused since 1971, and the stairs have been removed to keep people from climbing it.

The tower is a prefabricated structure built by the Aermotor Corporation and provided a front line of defense in preserving the Adirondack Forest Preserve from the hazards of forest fires.

It was added to the National Register of Historic Places in 2008.
