= Goldsmith, New York =

Hamlet in New York, United States

Coordinates: 44°34′08″N 73°59′53″W

Goldsmith is a hamlet in the Town of Franklin, Franklin County, New York, United States, approximately 30 miles (48 km) west of Plattsburgh, New York.

Goldsmith is a virtual ghost town today, but over one hundred years ago it was a bustling community with a school, a post office, two hotels, a grand ball room and numerous houses. A sawmill was located along the North Branch of the Saranac River, and a dam formed a small lake or mill pond extending up to Slab Bridge. The land, once logged, proved to be excellent farm land. Goldsmith was one of the first Adirondack villages to have electricity. Much of the land was granted by Garret Smith, some to escaped or freed slaves. Charcoal was an early product, made for nearby forges.

The dam was blown out in 1926, and the mill closed. Farming remained vibrant. Hops were grown during Prohibition. Few year round residents remain. Much of the land around Slab Bridge was subdivided into small 1 and 2-acre (8,100 m^{2}) lots.

The Nature Conservancy has purchased much of the area of Goldsmith.
