= North Bangor, New York =

- Hamlet
- Location within New York Location within the United States
- Coordinates: 44°50′31″N 74°24′04″W
- Country: United States
- State: New York
- County: Franklin
- Elevation: 666 ft (203 m)
- Time zone: UTC-5 (Eastern (EST))
  - Summer (DST): UTC-4 (EDT)
- ZIP code: 12966
- Area codes: 518 & 838
- GNIS feature ID: 958669

North Bangor is a hamlet in Franklin County, New York, United States. The community is located along U.S. Route 11, 5.3 miles (8.5 km) west of Malone. North Bangor has a post office with ZIP code 12966.
