= The Rainbow Inn =

Historic location

Coordinates: 45°21′29″N 84°57′36″W

The Rainbow inn: Petoskey's Afro-American Resort Hotel

Rainbow Inn was an Afro-American hotel and restaurant in Petoskey, Michigan, that was in business from 1950 until 1965.

== Background ==
The Rainbow Inn was founded and built by William T. West of Columbus, OH. West worked for the PA Railroad system.

The 1950s and 1960s era of the northwest Lower Peninsula of Michigan was a time period of expanding summer resort tourism. One of the top summer resort towns in the northern Michigan area, known as the "Tip of the Mitt," was Petoskey. The small city of 5,000 people was located on the eastern and southern shoreline of Little Traverse Bay, Lake Michigan. It was the first northern Lake Michigan town to draw a summer clientele of Midwestern city dwellers beginning in 1875. The Grand Rapids and Indiana Railroad had laid its rails northward and needed to fill its passenger cars with riders. The railroad began an advertising campaign towards people in the cities of Detroit, Chicago, and Cincinnati, who were interested in relief from the city summer heat. The railroad also promoted Petoskey as a place for freedom from the suffering of hayfever and other allergies.

From the late 1870s into the post-World War II era of the 1950s and 1960s, wealthy Midwesterners from Chicago, Cincinnati, Cleveland, Detroit and St. Louis came north every summer to the Petoskey area via the various summer railroad passenger trains. They either stayed or ventured further north to Mackinaw City or Mackinac Island. They also came north via the Great Lakes on passenger steamships such as the "Manitou", and "South American." Others chose to arrive by passenger car using US Highways 27 (US 27), US 31, and US 131. The first and largest Petoskey summer resort was located on Little Traverse Bay just east of the city limits. This was the Bay View Association, founded in 1875 as a Chautauqua summer gathering spot by the Methodist Church.

== Jim Crow in the Northland ==
The 1950s and 1960s was an era when racial discrimination against Afro-Americans was widely practiced in the state of Michigan and most of the Midwestern states. Public accommodations that could be used by black tourists and travelers were so scarce in the northern United States that New York City resident Victor Green, a postal carrier and travel agent, had published The Negro Motorist Green Book beginning in 1936. It was an annual guidebook for African Americans to use to help keep themselves from running into difficulties and embarrassments when white owned businesses would not serve them. It was well known to blacks that whites in southern states practiced Jim Crow discrimination at their hotels, restaurants, gas stations and department stores. They also quickly learned that outside of the major cities of the north, the same Jim Crow discriminatory policies were practiced by white business owners. Many small towns were even referred to as "sunset or sundown" towns, that is, no blacks allowed after dark.

== Maids day off ==
Most, if not entirely all, of 1950s and 1960s summer resorters who came north every summer to the Petoskey area were caucasians. They came to visit their Lake Michigan cottages, vacation homes, and the many resort hotels. Accompanying many of these wealthy Midwesterners were maids on their days off. On that day Petoskey, known for its small downtown stores for shopping, would see a sea of blue descend on it for the day. Black maids would wear their blue uniforms to come to town to shop. Often they were driven by their employer's chauffeurs in expensive limousines. Though allowed to shop in the white-owned businesses, it was not standard practice for the Afro-Americans to eat or drink in the downtown stores. That had to be done either at the Tip Top Tavern on Petoskey's Michigan Street, or Ruby's, outside of town near Harbor Springs. Both establishments catered to Native Americans of the area or the summer Afro-American help. In nearby Harbor Springs, Mrs. Murray's Tea Room served the summer black servant crowd.

The first Afro-American resort hotel and restaurant in the Northern Michigan area opened in the summer season of 1950. Former Pennsylvania Railroad (formerly the Grand Rapids & Indiana Railroad) employee and Afro-American businessman William Thomas West was the proprietor. The retired railway porter-chef, and wife Gail, both from Columbus, Ohio, decided that there would be enough business in the area to support such an endeavor. They chose the name "Rainbow Inn" with the idea in mind that their establishment might attract people of all color. And sometimes it did. While mostly summer black tourists, vacationers and local Native Americans frequented the Clarion Avenue dining spot, many white hunters and fisherman would also stay there in the spring and fall months of the year. The Rainbow Inn was a particular favorite of the Afro-American summer chauffeurs, maids, cooks and servants. The hotel restaurant was not far from the Victory Lanes bowling alley where people of color were also welcome.

== The end ==
On March 9, 1965, the Rainbow Inn was totally destroyed by a kitchen stove fire that was too far gone to be put out by arriving firemen. The hotel structure at 1630 Clarion Avenue had been constructed in the late 1880s almost entirely of wood. It was originally built as the mansion for the Fredrick Bauerle family, a wealthy wooden ware factory owner in Petoskey. Over the years the three-story building had undergone many renovations which eventually had helped turn it into the Rainbow Inn after purchase by the Wests. Only a few months earlier the United States Congress had passed the Civil Rights Act of 1964, which outlawed discrimination based on race, color, religion, sex, or national origin. Specifically, Title II of the act outlawed Jim Crow racial discrimination in hotels, motels, restaurants, theaters, and all other public accommodations engaged in interstate commerce. That essentially was the beginning of the end of black-only resorts, hotels and or restaurants. Soon, Las Vegas and other venues for entertainment in the United States would be open to people of all colors, and establishments like the Rainbow Inn would be history.
