= Loon Lake, New York =

- Hamlet
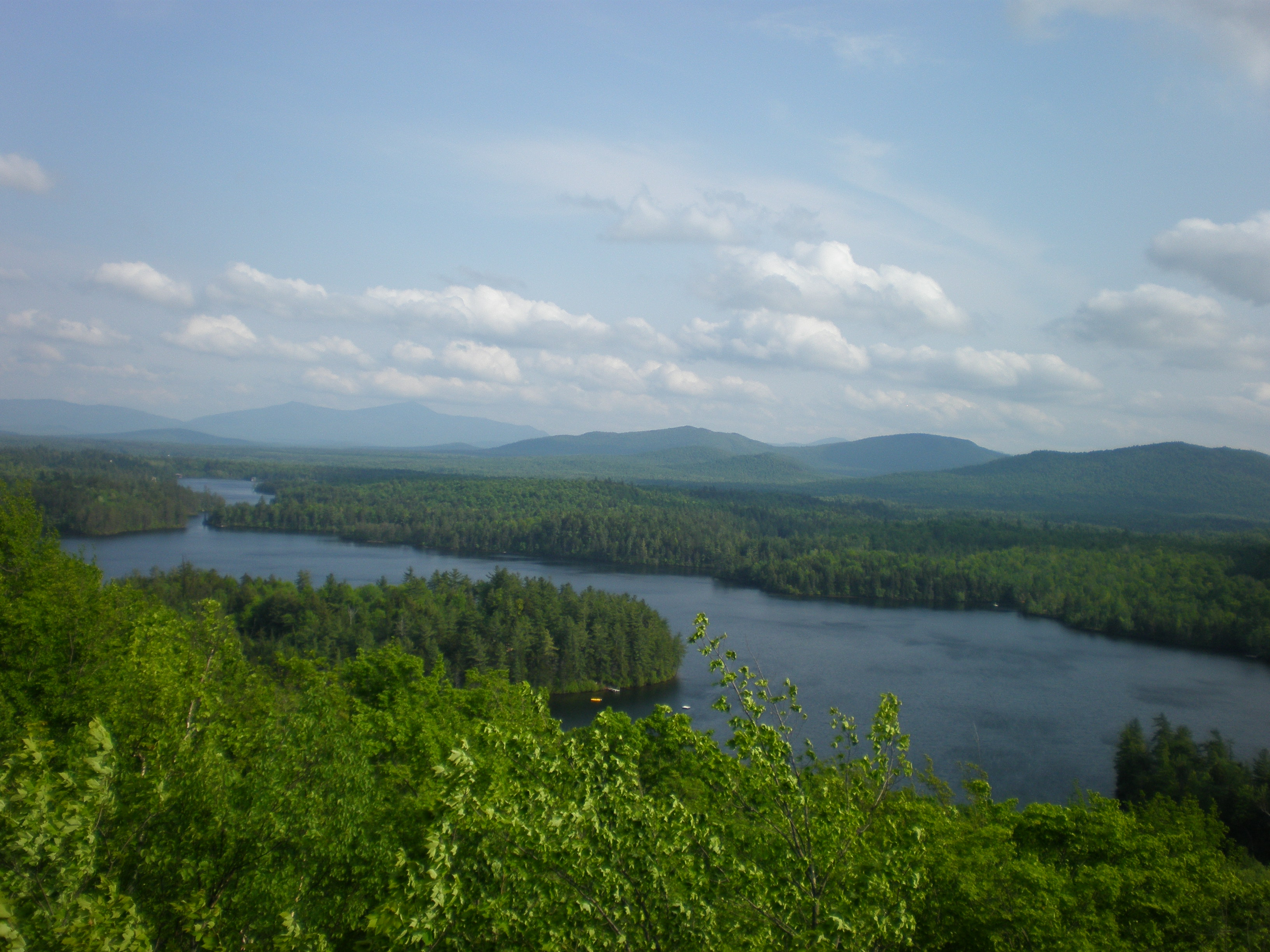
- Loon Lake from Crusher Mountain

- Location within New York
- Coordinates: 44°33′05.5″N 74°03′24″W
- Country: United States
- State: New York
- County: Franklin
- Town: Franklin
- Elevation: 1,800.0 ft (548.64 m)
- Time zone: UTC-5 (Eastern (EST))
  - Summer (DST): UTC-4 (EDT)

Loon Lake is a hamlet and a lake in the northeastern region of Adirondack Park in the U.S. state of New York. The community is located on the east side of Loon Lake and 18 miles (29 km) northeast of Saranac Lake and 27 miles (43 km) north of Lake Placid.

Loon Lake was one of several socially prominent destinations in Franklin County throughout the late 19th and early 20th centuries; it featured the Loon Lake House resort.

== History ==
=== Blacksville ===
In 1848 abolitionist Gerrit Smith gave 200 acres (81 ha) to Willis Hodges, a free black from Virginia, to settle a community with 10 families. They named it Blacksville. The families were disappointed at and ill prepared for the isolated frontier conditions and harsh winters, and lacked basic resources for building a town settlement, as Gerrit Smith had not offered anything except the parcels of land; John Brown, the famous abolitionist, a neighbor and fellow grantee who had asked Gerrit Smith for a tract in order better to organize in the area against slavery, could not offer much material assistance especially during the harsh winters, and Hodges and the settlers became discouraged and abandoned the community after two winters.

=== Paul Smith ===
After Blacksville was abandoned, entrepreneurs built two inns, the Merrillsville Inn and Loverin Tavern, to serve loggers and hunters. Among the latter was Paul Smith. He enjoyed the area and bought 200 acres in 1852 on the North Branch of the Saranac River for $300. Here he built "Hunter's Home", serving doctors, lawyers, and other professionals who came to the area to hunt big game. In 1858 Hunter's Home burned. Smith relocated to the lower St. Regis River, where he built a much larger hotel.

=== Loon Lake House ===
In 1878 Mary and Ferd Chase purchased 10 acres on a bluff overlooking Loon Lake. They built The Loon Lake House, a 31-room hotel. The resort's instant success allowed the Chases to expand operations, and by 1893 the Loon Lake House's capacity reached 500 guests. Eventually, the resort would expand to accommodate 800 guests across three hotel structures and 60 private cabins spread over the resort's 3,000 acres.

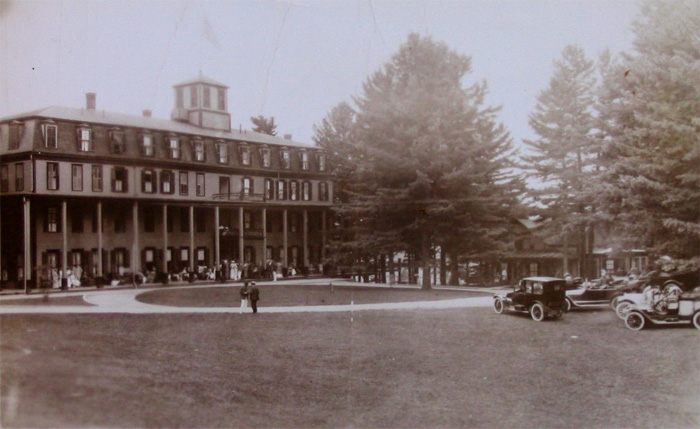
Main house

The resort had an expansive infrastructure that included two water systems, an underground sewer, an early electrical system, a dairy, vegetable and flower gardens, a large boat house, bowling alleys, and one of the Adirondacks' first golf courses, built in 1895. (The Loon Lake Golf Course was abandoned in 2003.)

In its heyday the large resort hotel was as self-sufficient as a small town; the resort also included a general store, post office, and a large and elegant train station. The train station originally served passengers of the Chateaugay Railroad, a branch of the Delaware and Hudson Railroad. In 1892 the New York Central Railroad completed its rail line to Loon Lake, allowing passage directly from New York City.

The beautiful landscape and luxury of the hotel attracted many public figures of the period. Presidents Grover Cleveland, Benjamin Harrison, and William McKinley enjoyed stays at the Loon Lake House during their tenures. Wealthy families of the period, including the Vanderbilts, Whitneys, Rothschilds, Rockefellers, and Guggenheims regularly stayed at the resort. Additionally, popular cultural figures, such as composers Irving Berlin and George Gershwin, and authors Theodore Dreiser, Sir Arthur Conan Doyle, and Oscar Wilde vacationed at the Loon Lake House.

The Chases owned and managed the hotel from construction in 1878 until 1929. Business dwindled after the stock market crash of 1929, and Mary Chase was forced to sell the resort. In 1956, the primary building burned. The remaining assets, including the grounds and cabins, were auctioned off in 1957. The rise of private automobile use and widespread construction of highways had created wide competition for vacationers.

== Loon Lake ==
Loon Lake is fresh water and approximately three miles long. The lake is positioned between Look Out and Loon Lake Mountains.

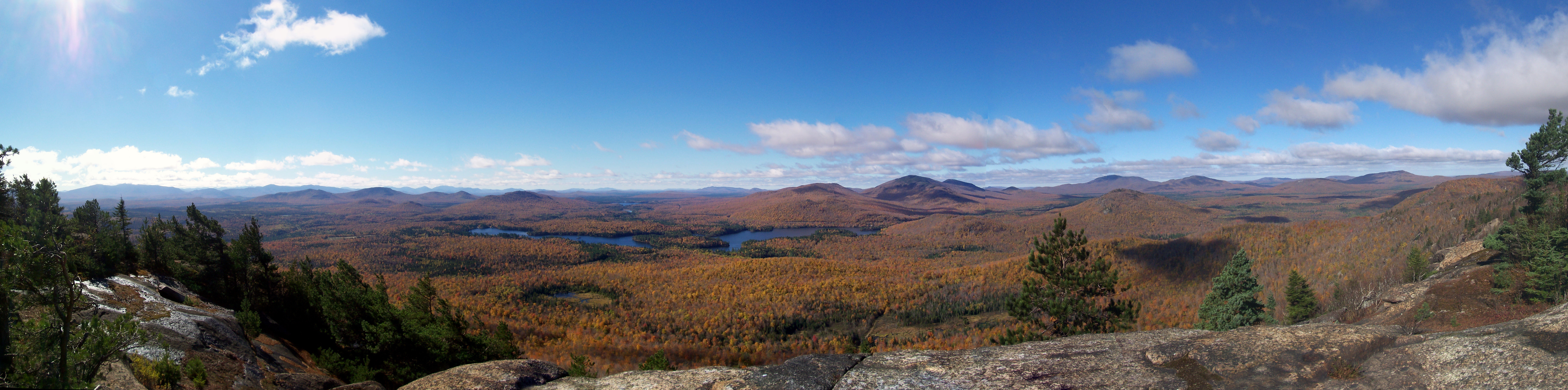
Loon Lake from Look Out Mountain.

== Cultural allusions ==
- Loon Lake a novel by E.L. Doctorow, is set in this area. A large private estate on the lake is the main setting for this 1930's Depression-era story.
- Loon Lake is mentioned in Chapter XLII of Theodore Dreiser's novel The Titan.

Loon Lake is the subtitle of Symphony #63 by American Composer Alan Hovhaness, composed in 1988.

== Sources ==
- Beckwith Smith III, Karl Loon Lake: An Introduction
- Collins, Geradine. The Biography and Funny Sayings of Paul Smith, Paul Smiths College, Paul Smiths, NY. 1965.
- "Loon Lake", New York Times, 18 July 2012
- "THE PRESIDENT AT LOON LAKE.; MRS. HARRISON CARRIED FROM THE TRAIN TO HER CARRIAGE". The New York Times. July 8, 1892.
