= Campsite =

Place used for overnight stay in the outdoors

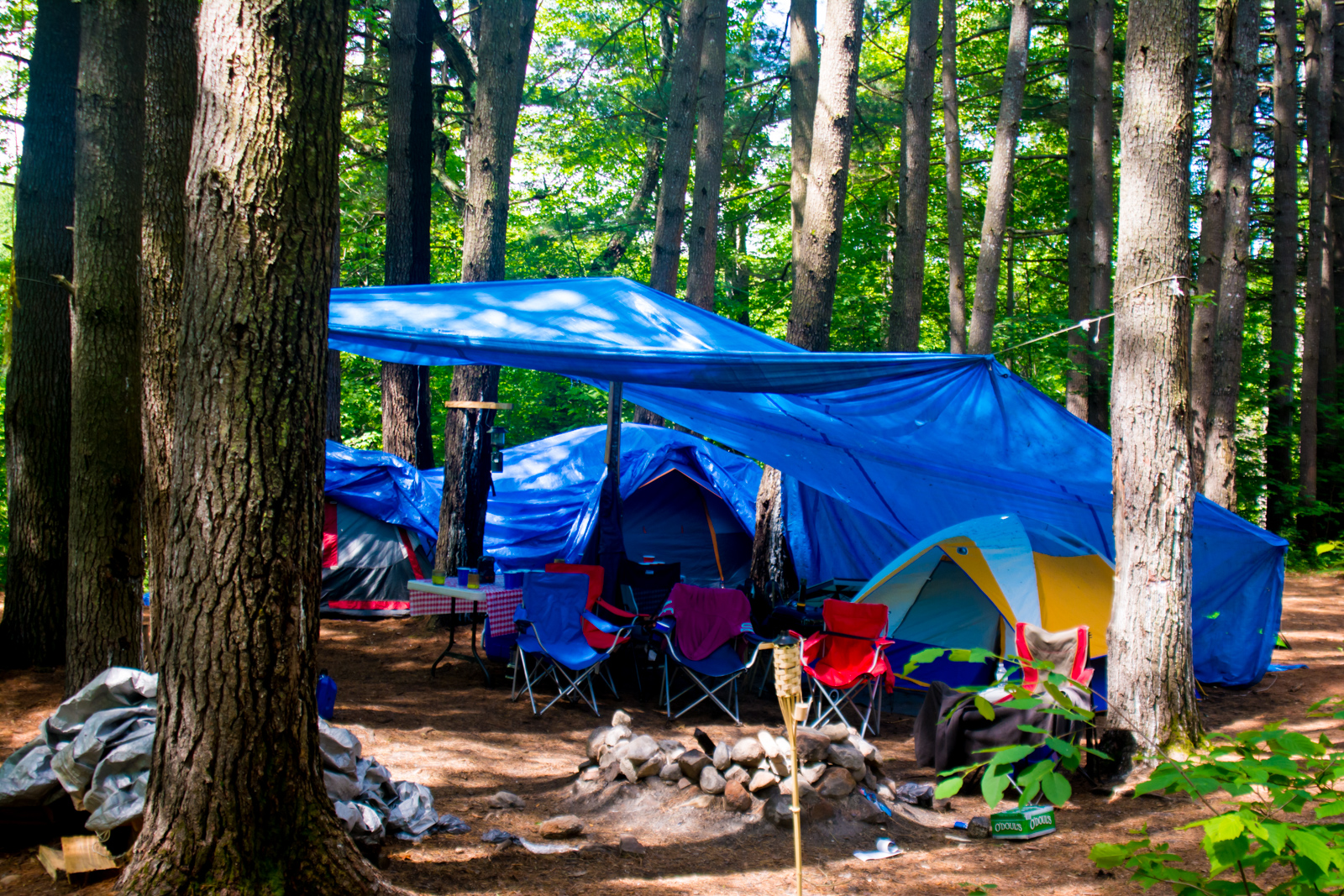
A campsite in the woods

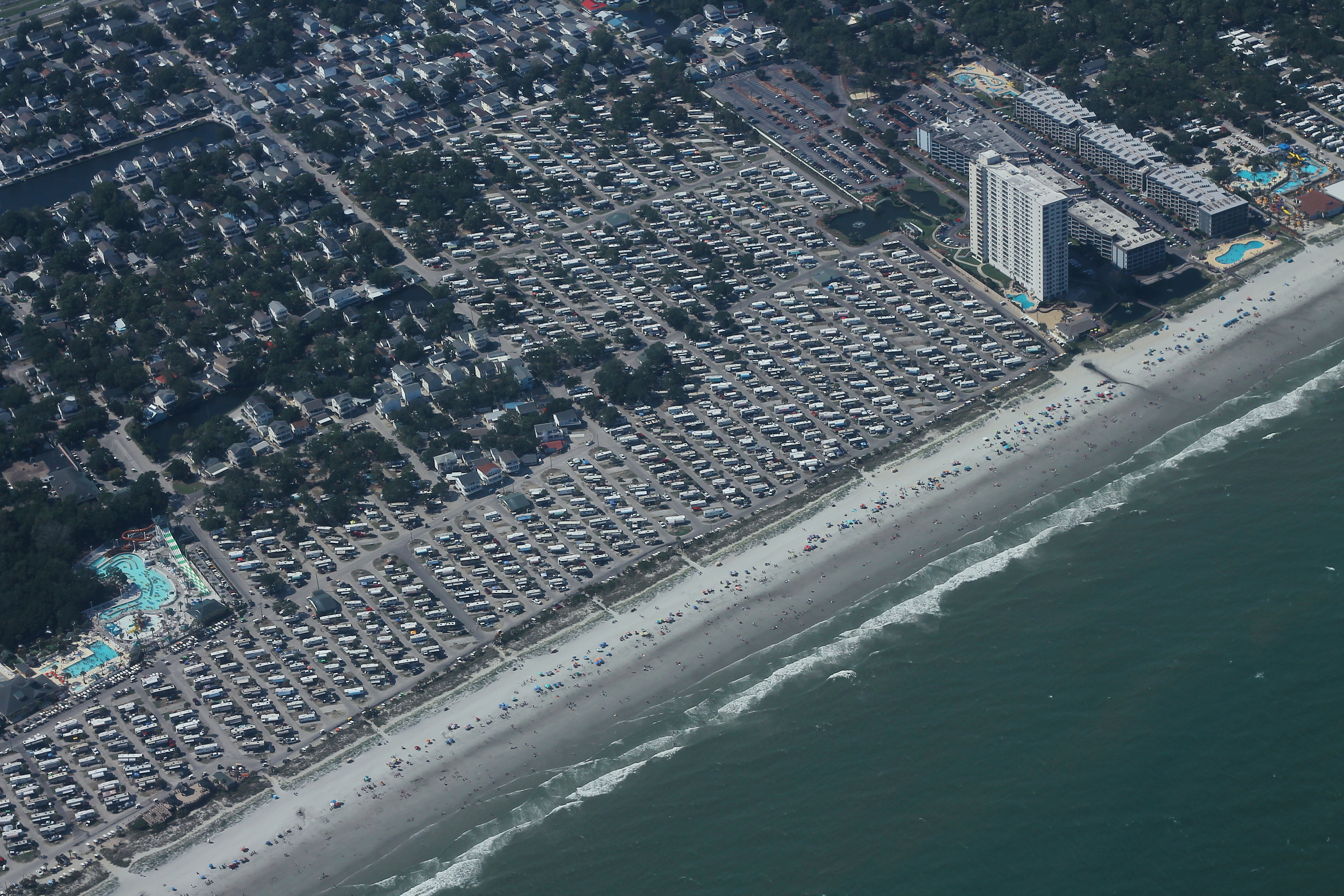
A large campground for caravans in Myrtle Beach, South Carolina (United States)

Campsite, campground, and camping pitch are all related terms regarding a place used for camping (an overnight stay in an outdoor area). The usage differs between British English and American English.

In British English, a campsite is an area, usually divided into a number of camping pitches, where people can camp overnight using tents, campervans or caravans. In the US, the expression used is campground and not campsite. In American English, the term campsite generally means an area where an individual, family, group, or military unit can pitch a tent or park a camper; a campground may contain many campsites.

There are two types of campsites (US) or pitches (UK): one, a designated area with various facilities; or two, an impromptu area (as one might decide to stop while backpacking or hiking, or simply adjacent to a road through the wilderness).

== Campgrounds ==
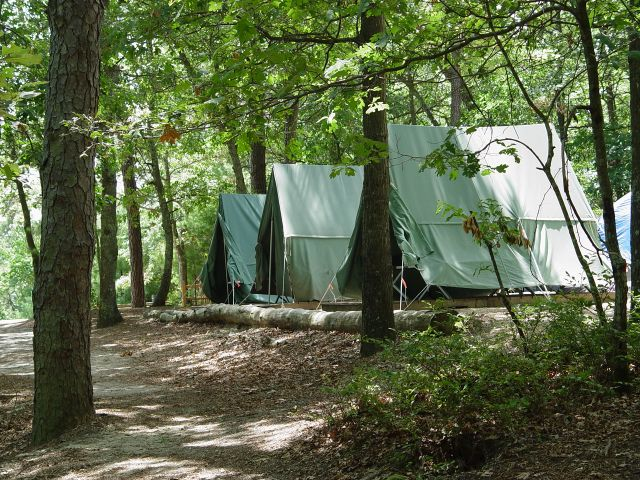
Semi-permanent tents on wooden platforms at a scout camp

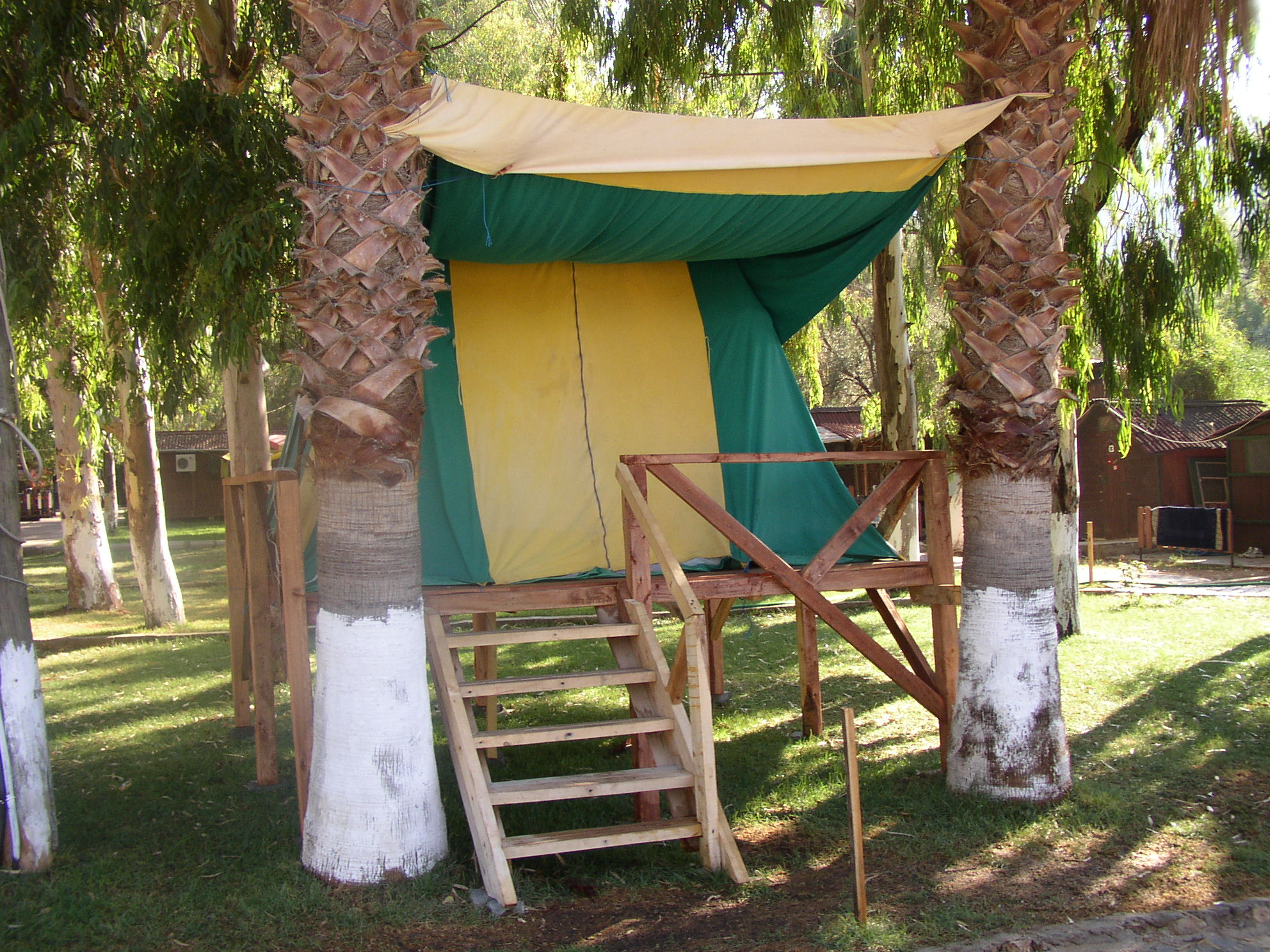
A campsite on Ölüdeniz beach

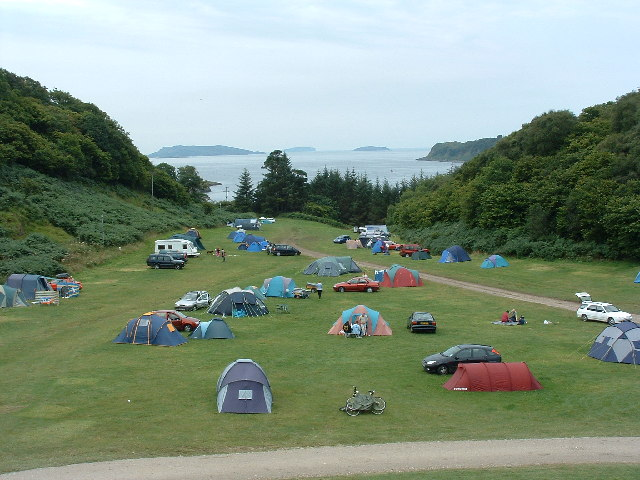
Undeveloped tent camping area

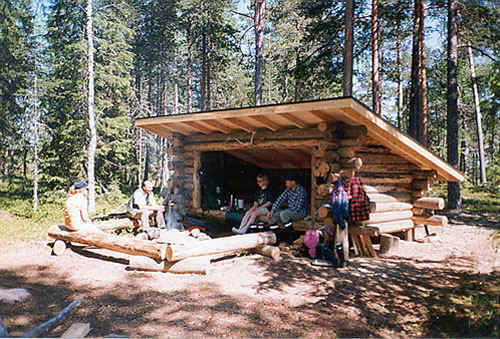
A lean-to camping in Finland

The term camp comes from the Latin word campus, meaning 'field'. Therefore, a campground typically consists of open areas where a camper can pitch a tent or park a camper. More specifically, a campsite is a designated area set aside for camping, often requiring a user fee. Campsites typically feature a few (but sometimes no) improvements.

Dedicated campsites, known as campgrounds, usually have some amenities. Common amenities include, listed roughly in order from most to least common:

- Fireplaces or fire pits in which to build campfires (this can be a circle of rocks, a metal enclosure, a metal grate, a concrete spot, or even just a hole).
- Road access for vehicles
- A gravel or concrete pad on which to park a vehicle
- Picnic tables
- Marked spaces indicating a boundary for one camper or a group of campers
- Reservations to ensure there will be available space to camp
- Utility hookups, such as electricity, water, and sewer, primarily for the use of travel trailers, recreational vehicles, or similar
- Raised platforms on which to set up tents
- Piped potable water

Campgrounds may include further amenities:

- Pit toilets (outhouses)
- Flush toilets and showers
- Sinks and mirrors in the bathrooms
- A small convenience store
- Shower facilities (with or without hot water)
- Wood for free or for sale for use in cooking or for a campfire
- Garbage cans or large rubbish bins in which to place refuse

Camping outside a designated campsite may be forbidden by law. It is thought to be a nuisance, harmful to the environment, and is often associated with vagrancy. However some countries have specific laws and/or regulations allowing camping on public lands (see Freedom to roam). In the United States, many national and state parks have dedicated campsites and sometimes also allow impromptu backcountry camping by visitors. U.S. National Forests often have established campsites, but generally allow camping anywhere, except within a certain distance of water sources or developed areas. Camping may also be prohibited in certain 'special areas' of national forests containing unusual landforms or vegetation. And if conditions allow campfires, a campfire permit is required for campfires outside of developed campsites.

In Britain, it is more commonly known as wild camping, and is mostly illegal. However, Scotland has a relaxed view and wild camping is legal in most of Scotland.

In many parts of Canada, "roughing it" or "dormir a la belle etoile" (French) is considered to be wilderness camping on government owned, public land known as crown land and commonly called "the bush". There are no amenities of any kind and typically no development except for possibly logging roads or ATV trails, and few rules beyond the requirement in some provinces to move the site at least 100 metres every 21 days.

=== RV parks/caravan parks ===
A symbol used to indicate the availability of trailer or RV camping

In North America many campgrounds have facilities for Recreational Vehicles and are also known as RV parks. Similar facilities in the UK are known as Caravan Parks. The Kampgrounds of America (KOA) is a large chain of commercial campgrounds located throughout the United States and Canada.

Both commercial and governmental campgrounds typically charge a nominal fee for the privilege of camping there, to cover expenses, and in the case of an independent campground, to make a profit. However, there are some in North America that do not charge a use fee and rely on sources such as donations and tax dollars. Staying the night in a big-box store parking lot is also common (called "boondocking"), and some retailers welcome RVs to their parking lots.

=== Trailer parks ===
Frequently confused with campsites, campgrounds and RV parks, trailer parks are made up of long term or semi-permanent residents occupying mobile homes, park trailers or RVs.

=== Holiday park ===
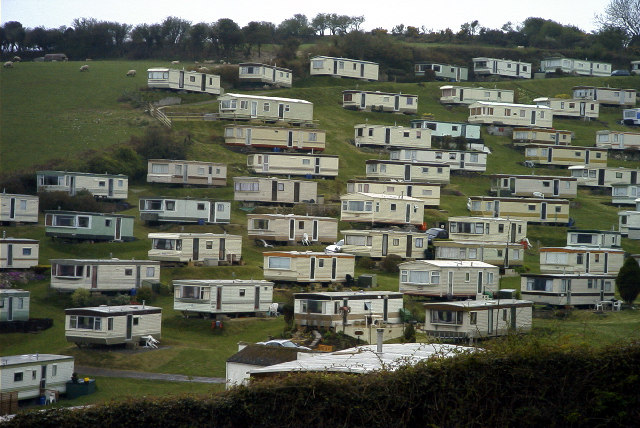
A caravan park at Beer, in South Devon, England

The holiday park is a United Kingdom version of the North American trailer park. Created to allow coastal resorts to enable temporary and high-income accommodation to be easily created, under UK planning laws, no residents are permanent, and the park must be wholly shut to all for at least two months each year. All of the mobile homes are either available for rent from the land owner, or pitches are leased on a long-term basis from the land owner and the lease's own mobile home placed on the pitch. Permanent sites owners lease includes the provision by the land owner of water, sewerage and general site and grounds maintenance. Some holiday parks includes a small campsite for those touring the area, where they can pay to pitch tents or site touring caravans and motorhomes. Touring campsites have full access to the Holiday parks facilities, including clothes washing and showering. Most holiday parks include a central entertainments block, which can include a shop, restaurants, and a multi-purpose theatre used for both stage and activity-based entertainment.

== By country ==
=== UK ===
==== Types of holiday park accommodation ====
Holiday parks vary in size and type, as do the kinds of accommodation available within them. Caravans are a popular choice with holiday makers, and modern varieties come complete with features like double glazing and central heating, cookers, fridges, showers, hot/cold water supplies, electricity and gas mains input. A standard caravan is a single unit, built to a maximum of 14 feet wide.

Other types of mobile home include Lodges and Park Homes which are more expensive than caravans and offer more luxurious features. Higher end Lodges can be built using some of the same methods as traditional bricks and mortar buildings and include familiar materials like plasterboard and tongue and groove walls for an end result that's very similar to a standard house. A standard lodge uses similar materials as a standard caravan such as wood, gypsum board and plywood where the main difference being the extra width. Lodges and Parkhomes can come in sizes up to 22 feet wide and 45 feet long, making them a popular choice with big families and large groups.

Holiday homes can be rented on an ad-hoc basis or purchased – caravans can be purchased from around £30,000 while park homes and lodges can cost between £100,000 and £500,000.

Once purchased, holiday homes have various ongoing costs including insurance, site fees, local authority rates, utility charges, winterisation and depreciation. Depending on the holiday home and the park these costs can range from £1,000 to £40,000 per year.

==== Certificated and Certified Locations ====
Certificated and Certified Locations are smaller privately owned caravan sites which have to be approved by the UK based Camping and Caravanning Club, The Caravan Club, and other organisations). These campsites are normally reserved exclusively for Club members. These smaller campsites are allowed to operate under The Public Health Act 1936 and The Caravan and Control of Development Act 1960.

=== Germany ===
==== Popularity and scale ====
According to the Federal Statistical Office, camping hit a record in Germany with close to 44.7 million guests camping overnight in 2025, which amounted to 9% of all guest overnight stays. In Germany, just under 650,000 pitches for permanent campers are statistically recorded, however, it is not known how many people actually live this way on a permanent basis.

==== Permanent camping (Dauercamping) ====
There's two different kinds of camping practices that are common in Germany, one is the classical overnight stays and the other is the permanent camping ('Dauercamping'), which means settling on one site for a longer period, often years. The forms of permanent camping can vary from permanently pitched, non-roadworthy caravans or motorhomes with fixed attachments, a front garden including a fence and a garden gnome (culturally popular), to people who rent a pitch on a long-term basis in order to store their vehicle outside the holiday season.

== Backcountry camping ==
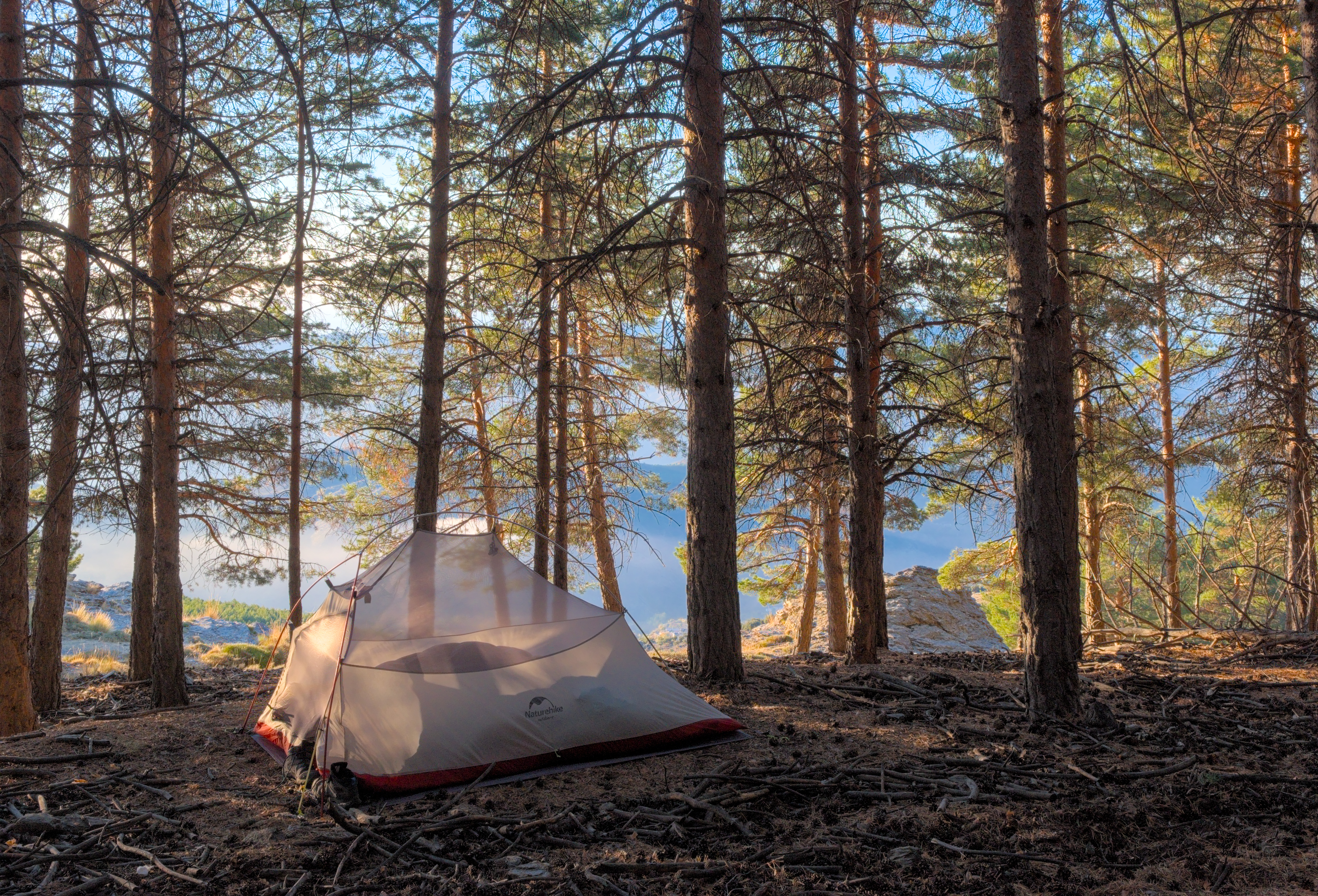
Backcountry camping in Sierra Nevada National Park

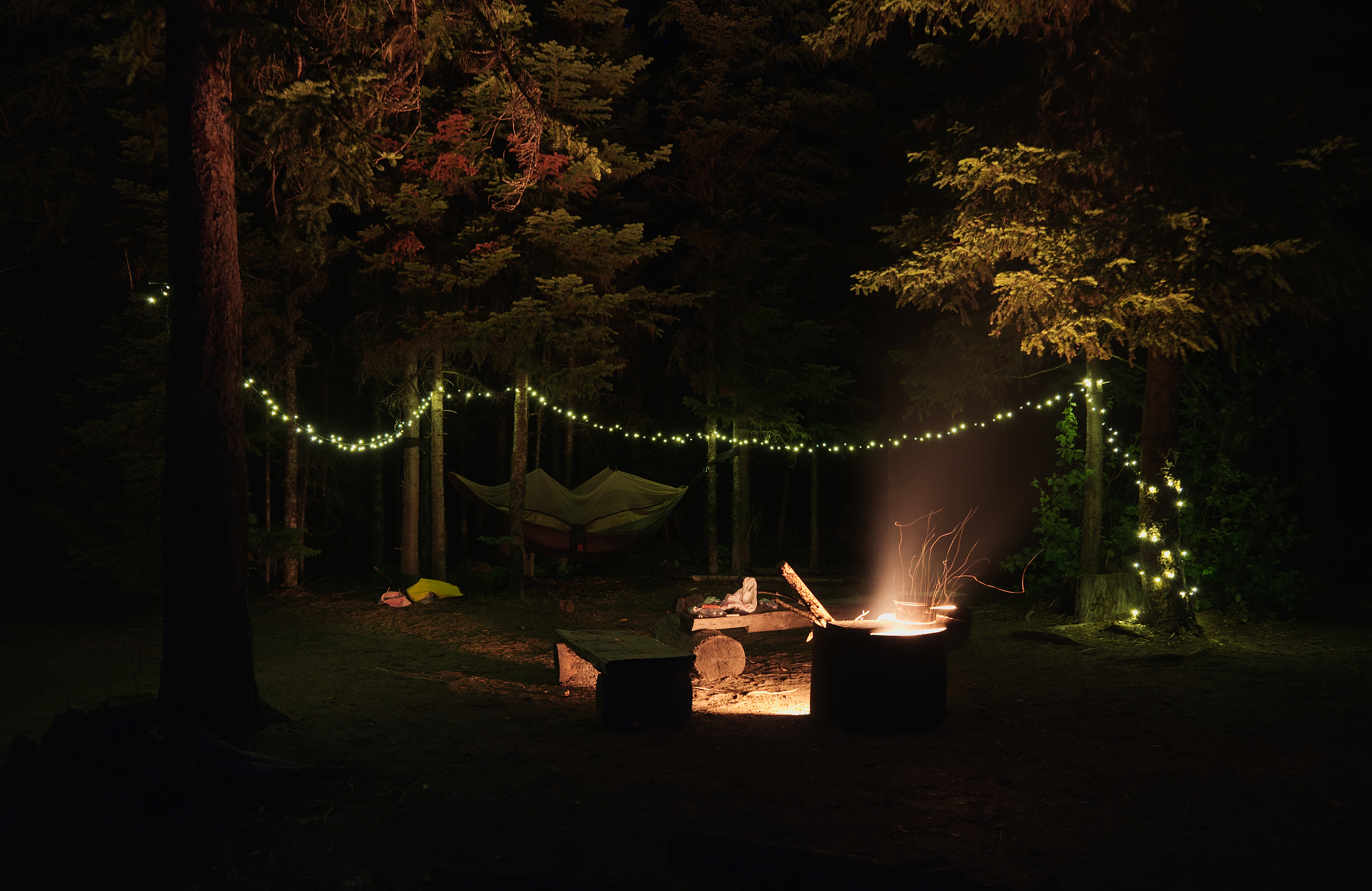
Backcountry hammock campsite at night in Bowron Lake Provincial Park, BC

In the U.S., backcountry or dispersed camping is common in large undeveloped protected areas. These areas can only be reached on foot, bicycle, canoe or on horseback. The camping areas are usually established campsites or "zones", which have a predetermined maximum number of persons that are allowed to stay in the section per night. Strict regulations are imposed regarding food storage and resource protection. Usually in organized parks or wilderness areas, backcountry campsites require a permit, which may be free, obtainable at visitor centers and ranger stations. Backcountry camping in other areas may not require a permit.

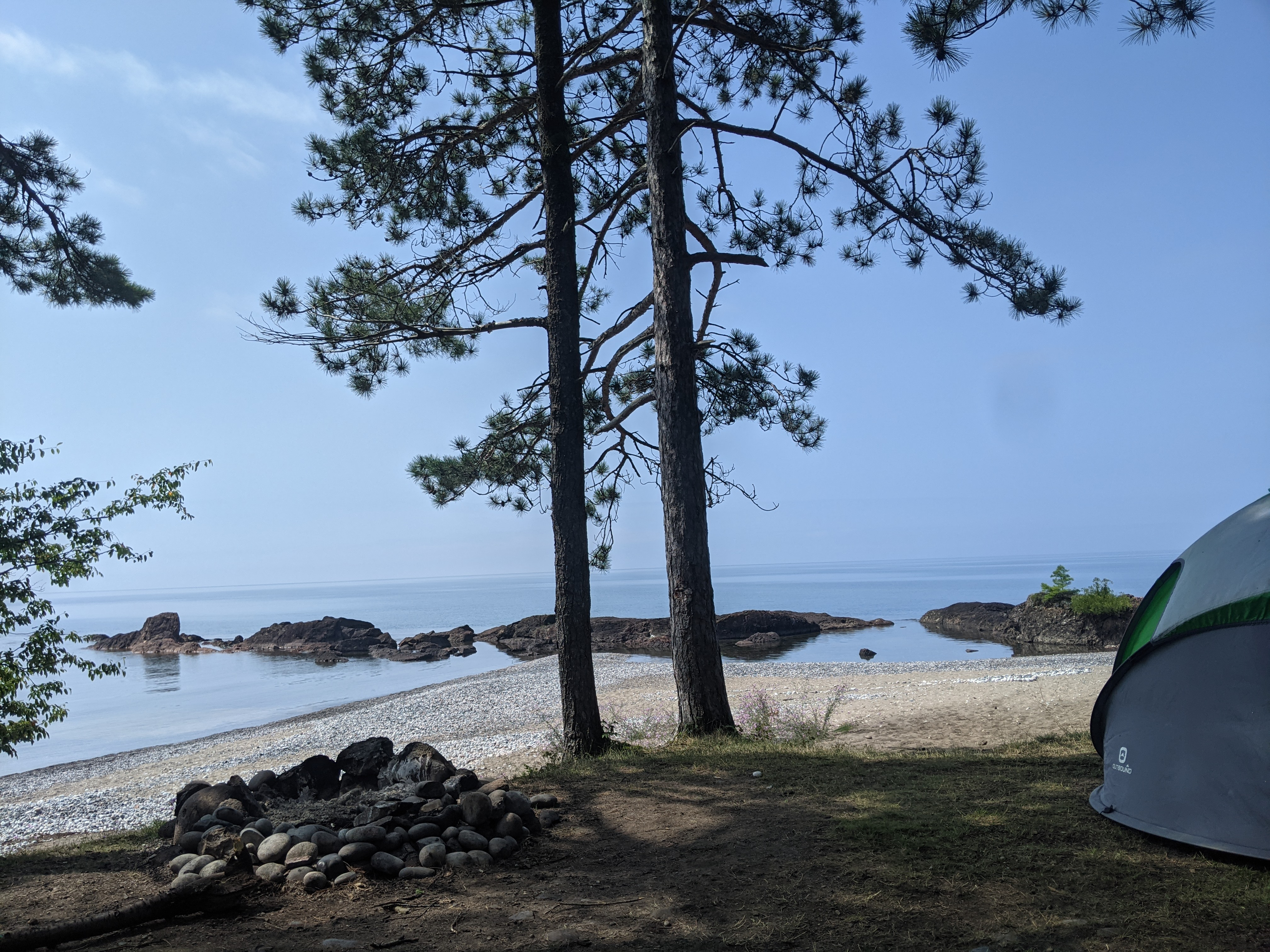
Campsite at Sawpit Bay

Canadians refer to it as crownland camping, or rough camping. Canadian citizens and people who have lived in Canada for at least seven months of the preceding 12-month period can camp for free up to 21 days on any one site in a calendar year. This ensures sites are available to others and helps reduce environmental impacts. The Crownland Atlas (map) provides usage designations and several web pages (map) or blogs provide more details about specific sites.

== History ==
=== United States ===
As with camping, campgrounds predated the automobile. When President Theodore Roosevelt addressed Congress in 1901, he called for the creation of free campgrounds on Federal lands. Already four national parks—Yellowstone, Sequoia, Yosemite, and Mount Rainier—were established and by the time Congress formally established the National Park Service in 1916, America had a dozen national parks.

While a handful of campgrounds, both public and private, could be found at tourist destinations, as late as 1936 it was still difficult to find places to stop along the route to these parks. Instead, it was common for motorists to pull off the road and set up camp on private property. This practice not only reinforced the negative, nomadic image of RV travelers, it was a detriment to expanding the trailer market. The Trailer Coach Manufacturers Association began to lobby states to establish sanitation standards and worked with civic and business leaders to establish additional campgrounds, emphasizing the economic benefits of a campground in their community. The Denver Civic Association wrote that a campground was just as essential to a town as a railway station. The trailer industry's efforts were effective. The number of campgrounds in the Trailer Travel Magazine's directory of campgrounds doubled to 1,650 by the end of 1936 and promised to double again by the end of 1937.

The campgrounds themselves also changed. Martin Hogue wrote, "The first public campgrounds in the United States were nothing more than large, dedicated clearings, free of trees, within which to concentrate groups of tourists." A plant pathologist named Emilio Meinecke, was commissioned to study the effect of motor tourism in the Redwoods in 1929. Meinicke's recommendations explained that instead of allowing campers to park haphazardly within a park, the camper's impact on the environment could be minimized through campground roads forming a one-way loop leading to individual parking spurs next to each campsite. Although he would later continue to write of the effect of campers on nature, submitting a memorandum to the National Forest Service in 1935 entitled "The Trailer Menace," he had established the basic design for campgrounds still used today.

== Movies and documentaries ==
- The Long, Long Trailer (1951)
- Carry On Camping (1969)
- Nuts in May (1976)
- Friday the 13th (1980)
- The Forest Primeval (1983)
- Sleepaway Camp (1983)
- Camping del Terrore (1986)
- Dirty Dancing (1987)
- Indian Summer (1993)
- The Red Squirrel (1993)
- Sune's Summer (1993)
- Camping Cosmos (1996)
- Ponterosa (2001)
- Món été au camping (2003)
- Happy Camper (Camping sauvage) (2004)
- Once I Was a Beehive (2015)
- Bodom (2016)

== See also ==
- Bear-resistant food storage container
- Camping
- Cantonment
- Cottage country
- List of human habitation forms
- Military camp
- Motorhome stopover
- National Park Service
- Paraje
- RV park
- Summer camp
