= Vermontville, New York =

Hamlet in New York, United States

Coordinates: 44°27′06″N 74°03′55″W

Vermontville is a hamlet in Franklin County in the U.S. state of New York. It is the seat of government of the town of Franklin. Vermontville is located near the southern town line on New York State Route 3.

== History ==
Vermontville was settled by men from Vermont in the early 19th century. The first postmaster, Josiah J. Alexander, was appointed in 1854. A sawmill was built in 1848, and a second in 1850; a starch mill operated from 1873 to circa 1876. A foundry was built in 1861 that continued until approximately 1889, producing plows, cultivators, and scrapers; it closed due to competition from products brought in by the Chateaugay Railway, that reached Vermontville at that time. Farming was the primary business enterprise. In 1856, the first church was built.

== Notable people ==
Bill Demong, an American Nordic combined skier who won the silver medal in the 15 km individual event at the 2007 FIS Nordic World Ski Championships, and the gold medal in the 2010 Olympic Games in Vancouver, is from Vermontville.
