= Tent platform =

Wooden structure

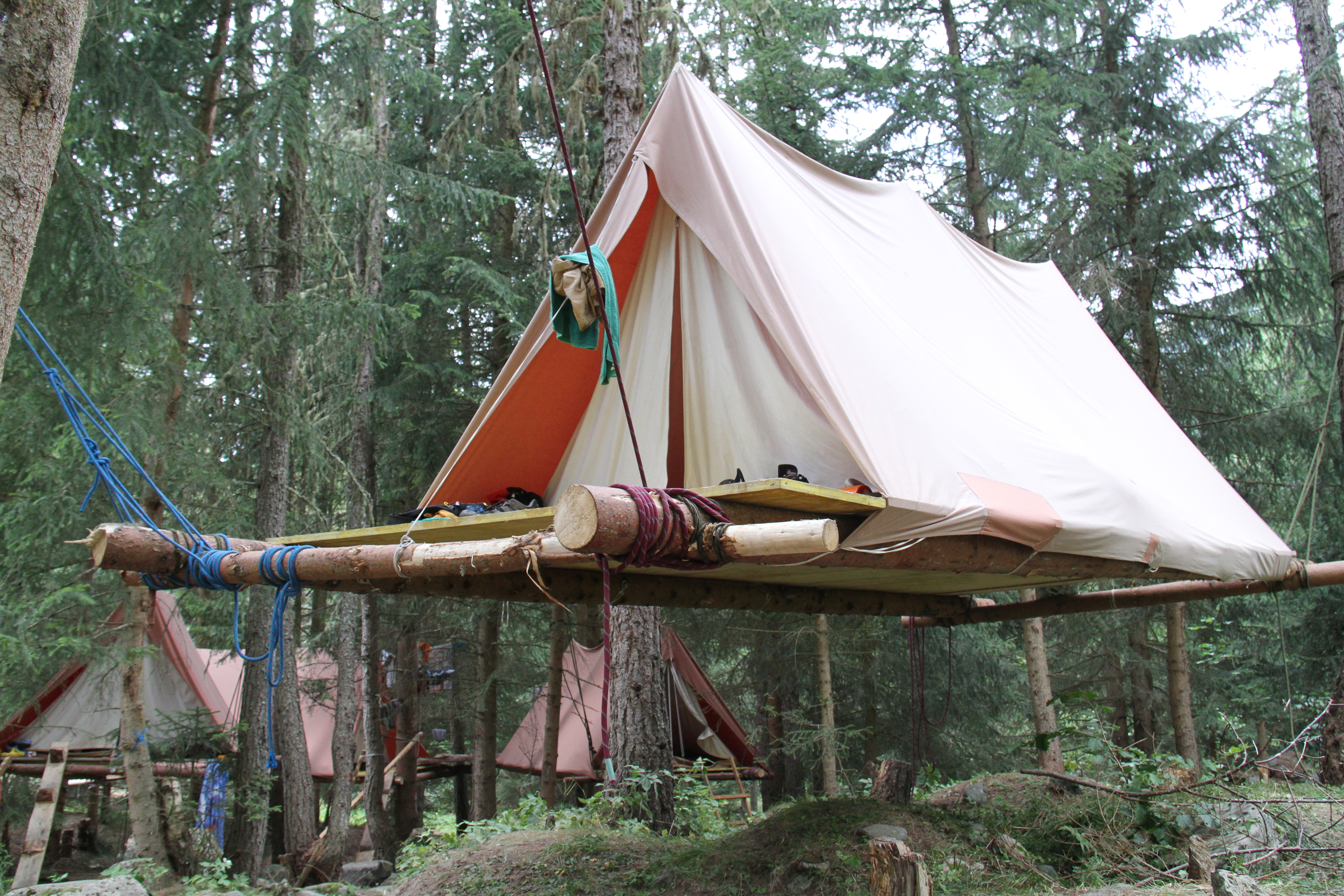
Suspended tent platform

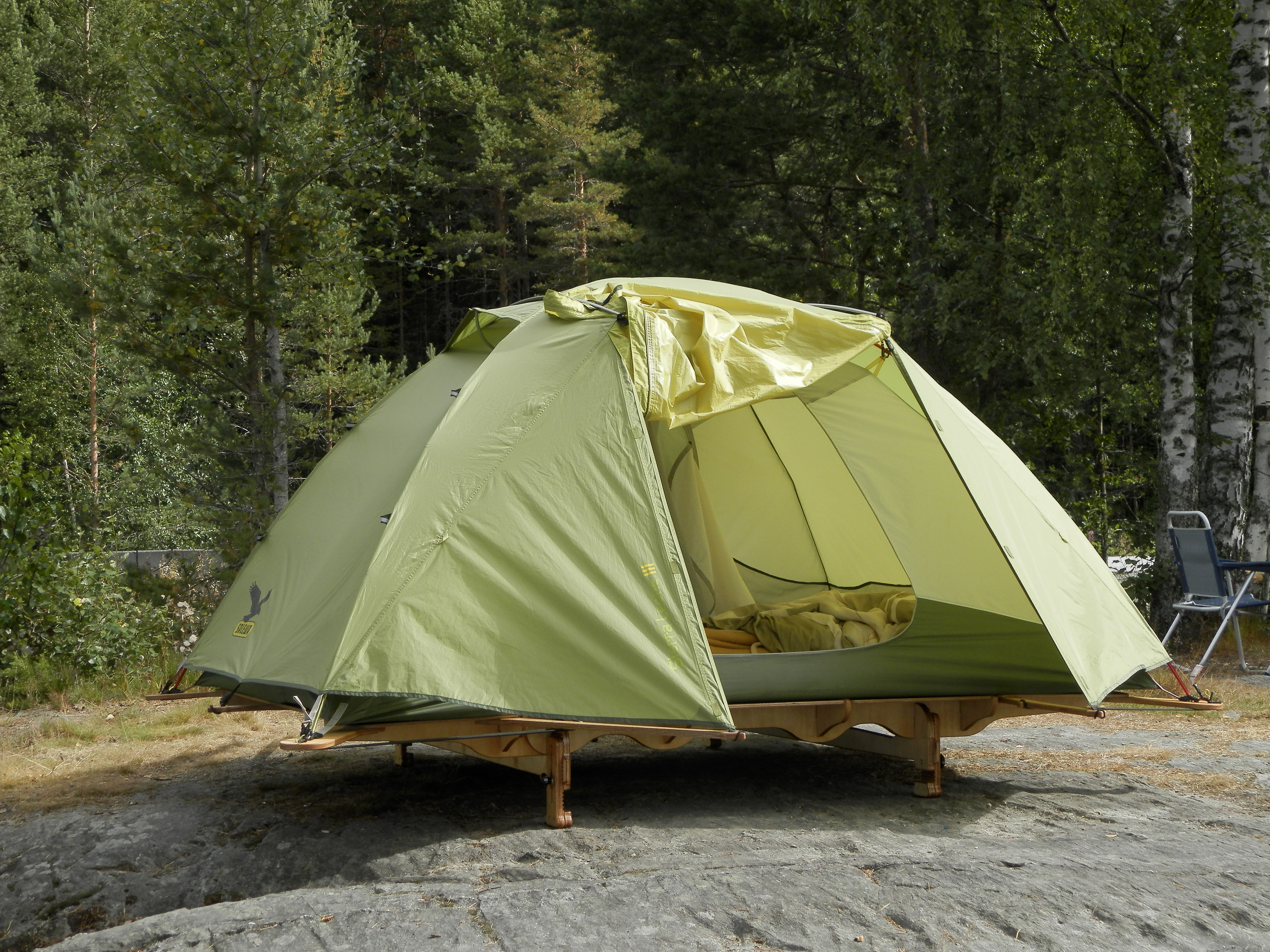
Portable tent platform

A tent platform is a floor for the purpose of pitching one or more tents upon. Typically, it is a wooden deck near a hiking trail that provides the hikers a clean and even place to sleep. It may also prevent the campers from trampling down the surrounding vegetation. Many campsites have tent platforms. Mountaineers sometimes build tent platforms in their base camps from materials such as pebble or snow.

There are roofed, suspended, floating, stacked or portable tent platforms. There are tent platforms mounted on top of automobiles, which support roof tents. Large-sized commercial or military tents do often stand on flooring systems, which are large-sized tent platforms.

== See also ==
- Tent pad, a designated area at a campground site to a set up a tent
