= Franklin County, New York =

County in New York, United States

- County
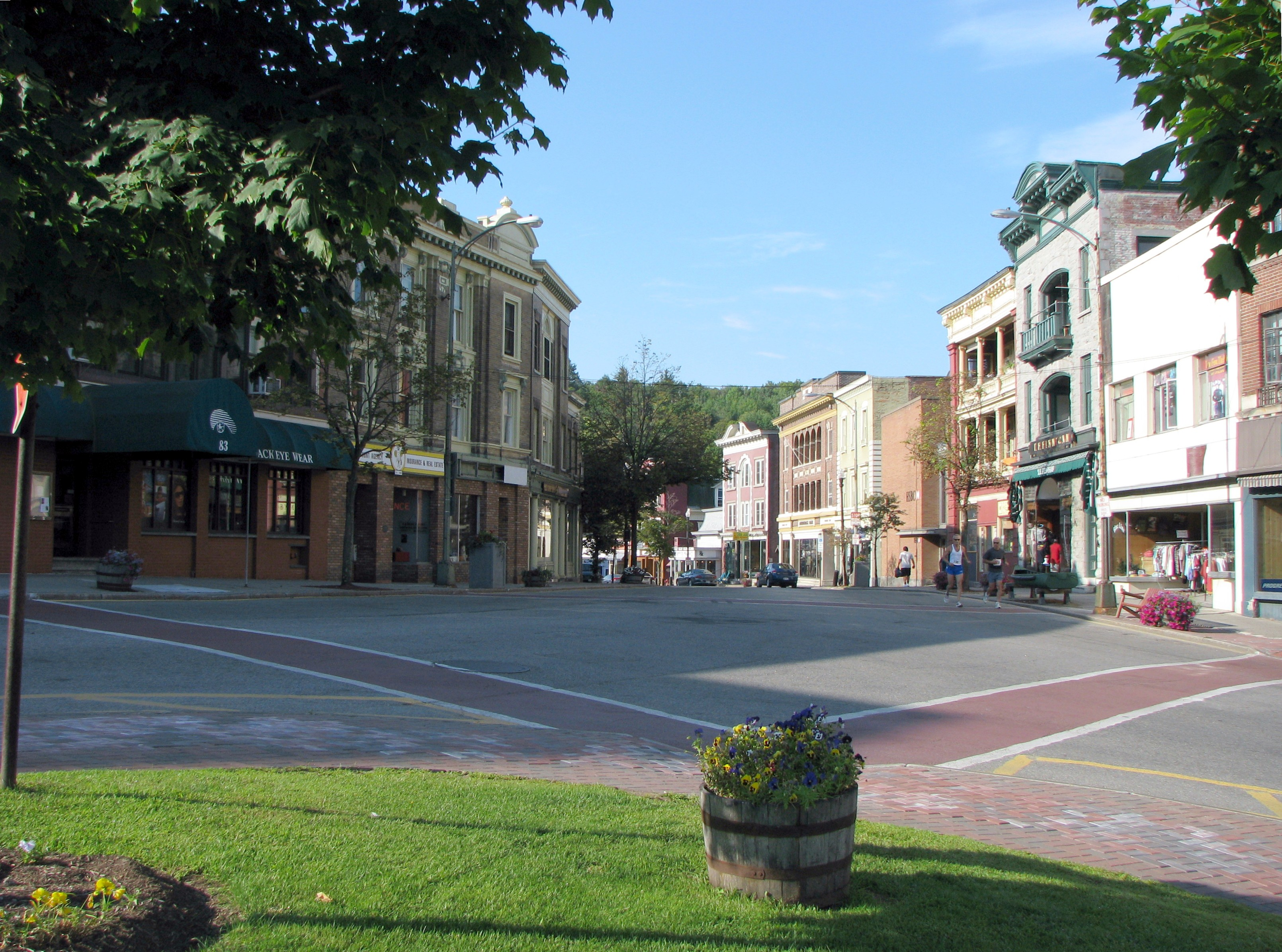
- Broadway Street, in Saranac Lake

- Flag Seal

- Location within the U.S. state of New York
- Coordinates: 44°36′N 74°19′W
- Country: United States
- State: New York
- Founded: 1808
- Named for: Benjamin Franklin
- Seat: Malone
- Largest village: Malone

Area
  - Total: 1,697 sq mi (4,400 km^{2})
  - Land: 1,629 sq mi (4,220 km^{2})
  - Water: 68 sq mi (180 km^{2}) 4.0%

Population (2020)
  - Total: 47,555
  - Estimate (2025): 46,500 ▼
  - Density: 29/sq mi (11/km^{2})
- Time zone: UTC−5 (Eastern)
  - Summer (DST): UTC−4 (EDT)
- Congressional district: 21st
- Website: www.franklincountyny.gov

Franklin County is a county on the northern border of the U.S. state of New York. To the north across the Canada–United States border are the Canadian provinces of Quebec and Ontario, from east to west. As of the 2020 census, the county population was 47,555. Its county seat is Malone. The county is named in honor of the United States Founding Father Benjamin Franklin. The county is part of the North Country region of the state.

Franklin County comprises the Malone, NY Micropolitan Statistical Area. Much of Franklin County is within Adirondack Park. Within the border of the county is the St. Regis Mohawk Reservation, or Akwesasne in the Mohawk language. Its population was nearly 3,300 in the 2010 census. The people are linked by community and history with the Mohawk of the Akwesasne reserve across the river, spanning the border of Quebec and Ontario. The Mohawk have had authority under the Jay Treaty to freely cross this international border.

== History ==
This area was long occupied by Iroquoian-speaking peoples. In historic times, a group of primarily Mohawks established a village south of colonial Montreal across the St. Lawrence River; they had been trading with French colonists and many had converted to Catholicism. They were the easternmost nation of the Iroquois League of Five Nations, known in their language as the Haudenosaunee.

After the English conquered the Dutch in the New York area, they established counties in 1683, in the eastern part of New York province and what is now Vermont. Both groups had settled primarily in Albany and along the Hudson River, a major waterway linking the upriver fur trade with the market of Manhattan. The first counties were very large in geographic area, taking in low-density populations. Gradually new counties were formed as colonial settlement increased, but most settlers stayed east of the middle of the Mohawk Valley, as the Iroquois nations controlled the lands beyond that. Historically, the French, Dutch and English all traded with the Mohawk, the easternmost of these nations.

The area of the present Franklin County was part of Albany County when it was established in 1683. This was an enormous county, including the northern part of what became New York State as well as all of the present state of Vermont and, in theory, extending westward to the Pacific Ocean. This county was reduced in size on July 3, 1766, by the creation of Cumberland County, and further on March 16, 1770, by the creation of Gloucester County, both containing territory now in Vermont. On March 12, 1772, what was left of Albany County was split into three parts, one remaining under the name Albany County. Charlotte County contained the eastern portion.

In 1784, the name "Charlotte County" was changed to Washington County to honor George Washington, the American Revolutionary War general and later President of the United States of America.

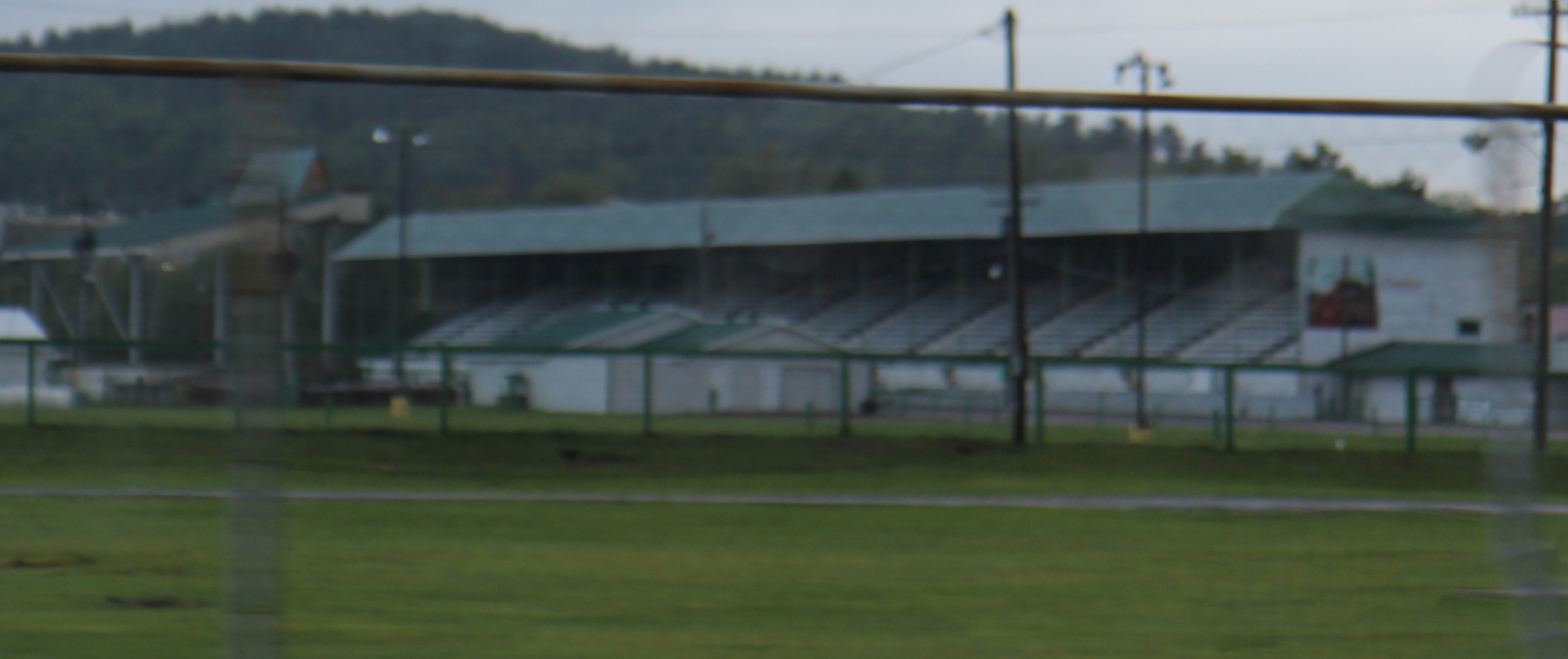
Franklin County Fairgrounds

In 1788, Clinton County was split off from Washington County. It comprised a much larger area than the present Clinton County, including several other counties or county parts of the present New York State.

Following the American Revolutionary War, the United States forced the Six Nations of the Haudenosaunee, or Iroquois Confederacy, to cede most of their lands in New York and Pennsylvania, as most had been allies of Great Britain, which had lost to the new United States. After the war, New York State sold off 5 million acres of former Iroquois territory at very low prices, seeking to attract settlers to develop farms and businesses. Land speculators quickly took advantage of the sales. Franklin County was part of the huge speculative Macomb's Purchase of 1791.

In 1799, Clinton County was reduced in size by the splitting off of Essex County. In 1802, Clinton County was reduced in size by a part of Clinton and two other counties being taken to form the new St. Lawrence County.

=== Franklin County organized ===
In 1808, Franklin County was split off from Clinton County and organized. It was named after United States Founding Father Benjamin Franklin. In the early decades many landowners basically were subsistence farmers.

In the late 1880s and 1890s, both the Delaware and Hudson and New York Central railroads were constructed into the Town of Franklin. The Chateaugay branch of the Delaware and Hudson served the hamlet of Onchiota, which developed for the lumber industry. For more than 12 years, a major tract north of Saranac Lake was harvested and millions of feet of timber were shipped out from here.

The railroads carried the timber and products to market, and the industry flourished into the early 20th century until much of the timber was harvested. Several lumber mills operated in this area for decades, including Kinsley Lumber Company, Baker Brothers Lumber Company, and one owned by the Dock and Coal Company. The latter mill was dismantled in 1917 and shipped to Florida to be used in the lumber industry there. The population declined as the lumber industry pulled out of the area.

The railroads contributed to the Town of Franklin becoming a destination for summer travelers. In the late 1800s, Franklin County was home to three of the largest resort hotels in the Adirondacks: Paul Smith's Hotel, Loon Lake House, and the Rainbow Inn. Due to the construction of highways and restructuring in the railroad industry, passenger service was ended to this remote area in the mid-20th century.

The history of Franklin County is preserved at the Franklin Historical and Museum Society in Malone, New York.

Ray Fadden (Mohawk), with his wife, Christine, and son, John, was the founder and curator of the Six Nations Indian Museum located in Onchiota, a census-designated place in the Town of Franklin. He built the structure from logs he had milled himself. The family-owned museum features more than 3,000 artifacts primarily from the Iroquoian nations, and interprets their culture. They were a prominent confederacy in New York of Six Nations by 1722, and they controlled much of the state west of colonial settlements in Albany and Schenectady.

== Geography ==
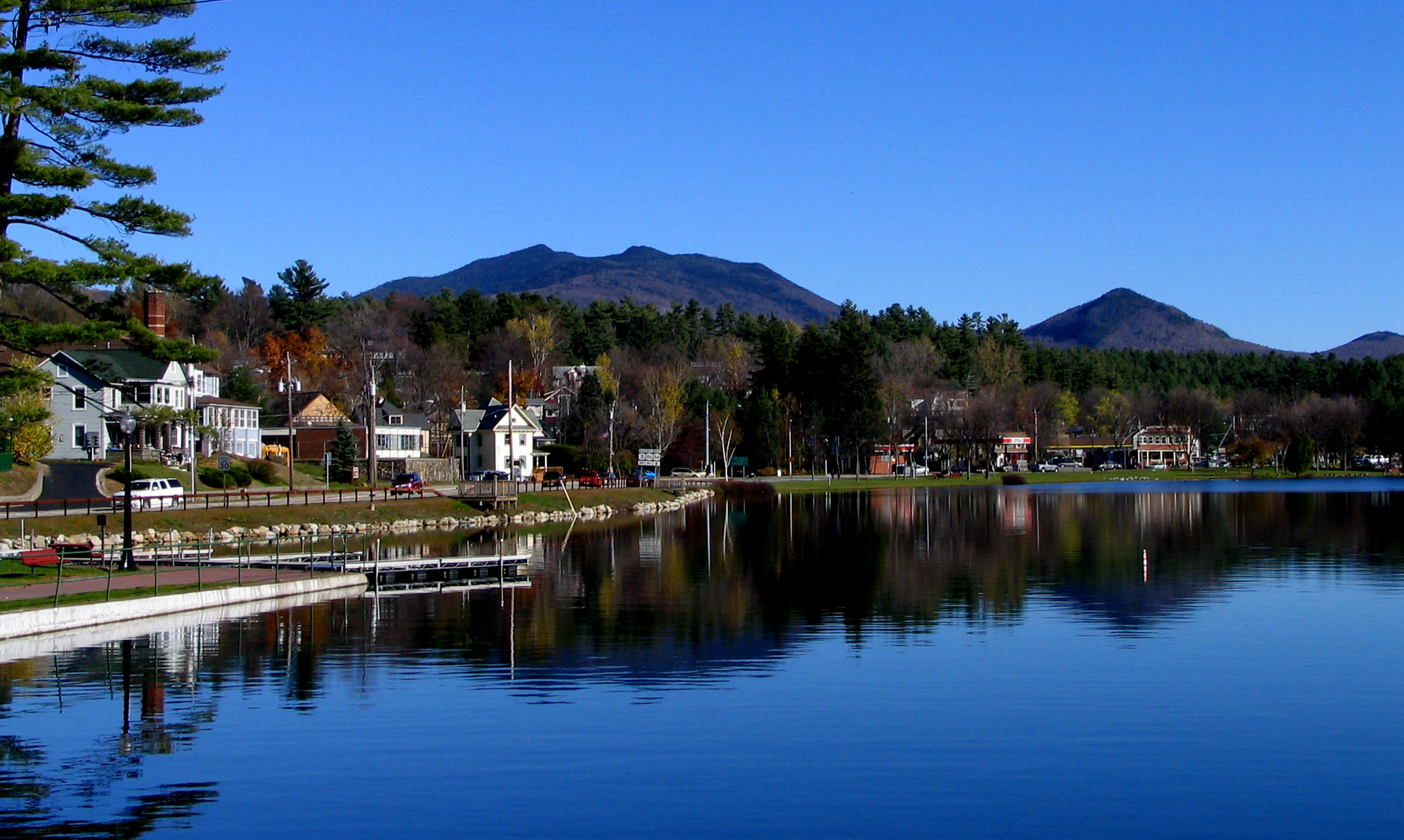
Lake Flower in Saranac Lake

According to the U.S. Census Bureau, the county has a total area of 1,697 square miles (4,400 km^{2}), of which 1,629 square miles (4,220 km^{2}) is land and 68 square miles (180 km^{2}) (4.0%) is water. It is the fourth-largest county in New York by land area. Franklin County is in the northeastern part of New York State. The northern edge borders Quebec and Ontario provinces of Canada.

The Upper, Middle and Lower Saranac lakes are located within the county. These are part of the natural resource attractions in the area. Lower Saranac Lake extends into neighboring Essex County to the southeast. Loon Lake is also located in the county, as is its namesake community.

=== Adjacent counties and municipality ===
- Clinton County - east
- Essex County - southeast
- Hamilton County - southwest
- St. Lawrence County - west
- Stormont, Dundas and Glengarry United Counties, Ontario, Canada - northwest
- Le Haut-Saint-Laurent Regional County Municipality, Quebec, Canada - north

== Demographics ==
Historical population
Census	Pop.	Note	%±
1810	2,617		—
1820	4,439		69.6%
1830	11,312		154.8%
1840	16,518		46.0%
1850	25,102		52.0%
1860	30,837		22.8%
1870	30,271		−1.8%
1880	32,390		7.0%
1890	38,110		17.7%
1900	42,853		12.4%
1910	45,717		6.7%
1920	43,541		−4.8%
1930	45,694		4.9%
1940	44,286		−3.1%
1950	44,830		1.2%
1960	44,742		−0.2%
1970	43,931		−1.8%
1980	44,929		2.3%
1990	46,540		3.6%
2000	51,134		9.9%
2010	51,599		0.9%
2020	47,555		−7.8%
2025 (est.)	46,500	▼	−2.2%
U.S. Decennial Census; 1790-1960 1900-1990; 1990-2000 2010-2020

=== 2020 census ===
Franklin County, New York – Racial and ethnic composition Note: the US Census treats Hispanic/Latino as an ethnic category. This table excludes Latinos from the racial categories and assigns them to a separate category. Hispanics/Latinos may be of any race.
Race / Ethnicity (NH = Non-Hispanic)	Pop 1980	Pop 1990	Pop 2000	Pop 2010	Pop 2020	% 1980	% 1990	% 2000	% 2010	% 2020
White alone (NH)	42,482	41,435	42,233	42,640	38,559	94.55%	89.03%	82.59%	82.64%	81.08%
Black or African American alone (NH)	82	1,508	3,180	2,834	1,686	0.18%	3.24%	6.22%	5.49%	3.55%
Native American or Alaska Native alone (NH)	2,083	2,341	3,132	3,753	4,102	4.64%	5.03%	6.13%	7.27%	8.63%
Asian alone (NH)	71	121	190	215	191	0.16%	0.26%	0.37%	0.42%	0.40%
Native Hawaiian or Pacific Islander alone (NH)	x	x	0	8	0	x	x	0.00%	0.02%	0.00%
Other race alone (NH)	33	12	27	76	91	0.07%	0.03%	0.05%	0.15%	0.19%
Mixed race or Multiracial (NH)	x	x	319	567	1,539	x	x	0.62%	1.10%	3.24%
Hispanic or Latino (any race)	178	1,123	2,053	1,506	1,387	0.40%	2.41%	4.01%	2.92%	2.92%
Total	44,929	46,540	51,134	51,599	47,555	100.00%	100.00%	100.00%	100.00%	100.00%

The most reported ancestries were:

- English (20%)
- Irish (14.1%)
- French (10.8%)
- German (6.7%)
- Saint Regis Mohawk Tribe (4.1%)
- Mohawk (4%)
- Italian (3.3%)
- Scottish (2.6%)
- French Canadian (1.8%)
- Polish (1.3%)

=== 2000 census ===
As of the census of 2000, there were 51,134 people, 17,931 households, and 11,798 families residing in the county. The population density was 31 inhabitants per square mile (12/km^{2}). There were 23,936 housing units at an average density of 15 units per square mile (5.8/km^{2}). The racial makeup of the county was 84.03% White, 6.63% Black or African American, 6.20% Native American, 0.38% Asian, 2.07% from other races, and 0.69% from two or more races. 4.01% of the population were Hispanic or Latino of any race. 31.0% were of French, 13.6% Irish, 10.6% American, 9.8% French Canadian, 9.2% English and 5.4% German ancestry according to Census 2000. 94.6% spoke English, 2.3% Spanish and 2.0% French as their first language.

There were 17,931 households, out of which 32.20% had children under the age of 18 living with them, 49.50% were married couples living together, 11.10% had a female householder with no husband present, and 34.20% were non-families. 28.20% of all households were made up of individuals, and 12.00% had someone living alone who was 65 years of age or older. The average household size was 2.46 and the average family size was 3.00.

In the county, the population was spread out, with 22.80% under the age of 18, 9.50% from 18 to 24, 33.20% from 25 to 44, 21.80% from 45 to 64, and 12.80% who were 65 years of age or older. The median age was 36 years. For every 100 females there were 121.70 males. For every 100 females age 18 and over, there were 126.60 males.

The median income for a household in the county was $31,517, and the median income for a family was $38,472. Males had a median income of $29,376 versus $22,292 for females. The per capita income for the county was $15,888. About 10.10% of families and 14.60% of the population were below the poverty line, including 17.60% of those under age 18 and 13.90% of those age 65 or over.

== Education ==
K-12 school districts include:

- AuSable Valley Central School District
- Brasher Falls Central School District
- Brushton-Moira Central School District
- Chateaugay Central School District
- Malone Central School District
- Northern Adirondack Central School District
- Salmon River Central School District
- Saranac Lake Central School District
- St. Regis Falls Central School District
- Tupper Lake Central School District

Franklin County is home to North Country Community College and Paul Smith's College. North Country Community College is sponsored by and serves Franklin and Essex counties, with campuses in Saranac Lake (village) - Malone (town) and Ticonderoga.

== Transportation ==
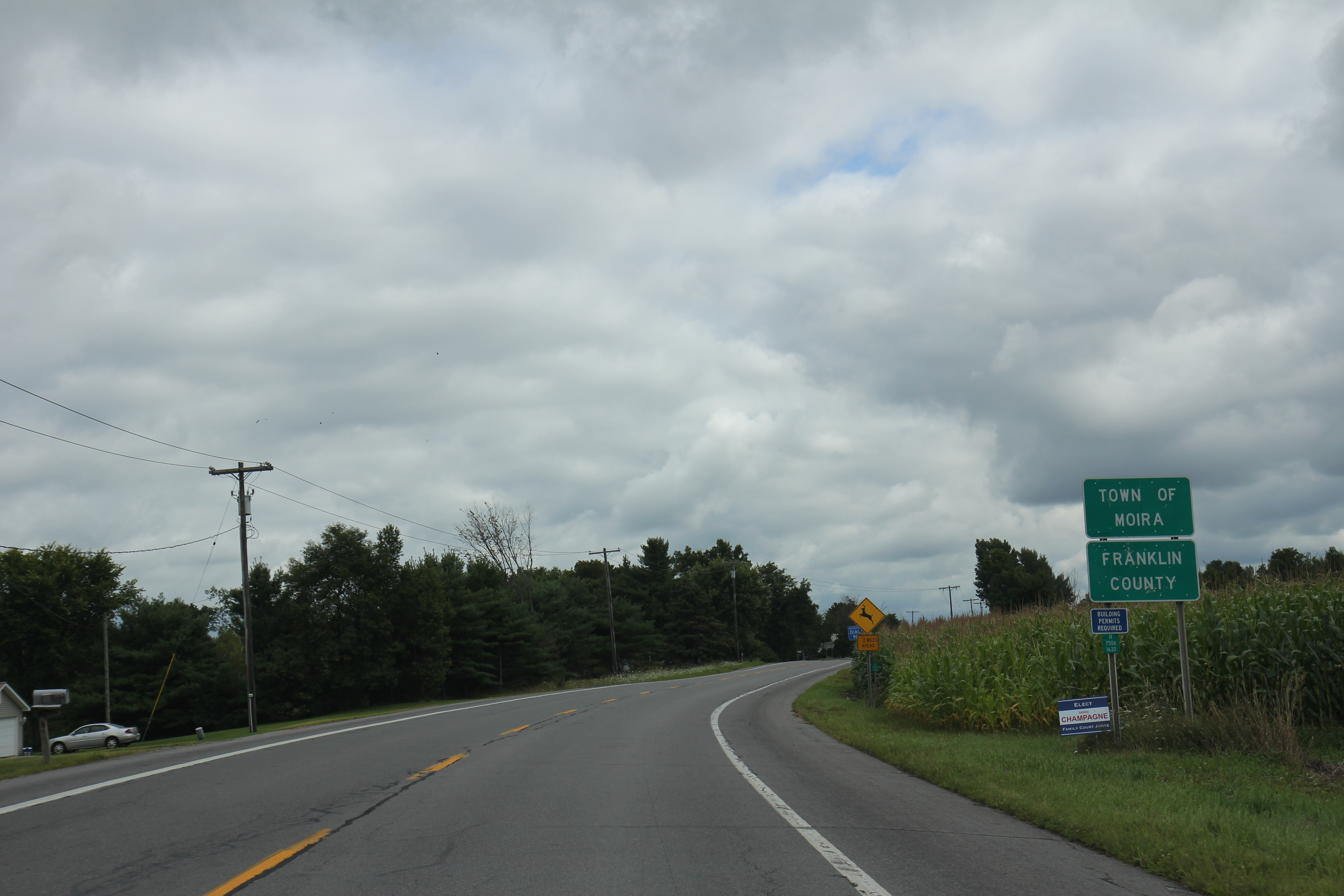
Entering Franklin County on US11 in the Town of Moira

The area has no public transportation but roads extend through the county. Scheduled train service by the New York Central from Lake Clear to Malone ended in 1956.

On April 24, 1965, the New York Central ran its final passenger train on the Adirondack Division from Lake Placid, through Lake Clear to Utica.

=== Airports ===
The following public use airports are located in the county:

- Adirondack Regional Airport (SLK) – Saranac Lake
- Malone-Dufort Airport (MAL) – Malone

== Communities ==
=== Larger settlements ===
#	Location	Population	Type	Area
1	‡Akwesasne	12,000	CDP/Territory	Northwest
2	†Malone	5,911	Village	North
3	‡Saranac Lake	5,406	Village	Adirondack Park
4	Tupper Lake	3,667	Village	Adirondack Park
5	Fort Covington	1,308	CDP	Northwest
6	Chateaugay	833	Village	North
7	Paul Smiths	671	CDP	Adirondack Park
8	Brushton	474	Village	North
9	St. Regis Falls	464	CDP	Adirondack Park
10	Burke	211	Village	North

† - County Seat

‡ - Not Wholly in this County

=== Towns ===
- Bangor
- Bellmont
- Bombay
- Brandon
- Brighton
- Burke
- Chateaugay
- Constable
- Dickinson
- Duane
- Fort Covington
- Franklin
- Harrietstown
- Malone
- Moira
- Santa Clara
- Tupper Lake
- Waverly
- Westville

=== Hamlets ===
- Gabriels
- Goldsmith
- Hogansburg
- Keese Mill
- Lake Clear
- Owls Head
- Reynoldston
- Saint Regis
- Skerry
- Upper St. Regis
- Vermontville

=== Native reservations ===
- St. Regis Mohawk Reservation is international, extending across the border into Quebec, Canada. Also known as the Akwesasne reserve, the community was founded in the mid-1700s, when all the territory was part of New France. Citizens of Akwesasne have rights for free passage across the border.

== Notable person ==
- Fernando C. Beaman, US Congressman

== Politics ==
United States presidential election results for Franklin County, New York
Year	Republican		Democratic		Third party(ies)	
Year	No.	%	No.	%	No.	%
1884	4,638	60.02%	2,948	38.15%	142	1.84%
1888	5,757	64.79%	3,028	34.08%	101	1.14%
1892	5,498	62.19%	2,999	33.93%	343	3.88%
1896	6,118	69.29%	2,490	28.20%	221	2.50%
1900	6,313	68.49%	2,666	28.92%	238	2.58%
1904	6,699	67.60%	2,869	28.95%	342	3.45%
1908	5,999	64.13%	2,935	31.37%	421	4.50%
1912	3,930	46.82%	2,711	32.30%	1,752	20.87%
1916	5,146	57.59%	3,593	40.21%	197	2.20%
1920	9,786	70.58%	3,825	27.59%	254	1.83%
1924	9,352	64.43%	4,364	30.07%	799	5.50%
1928	9,495	49.86%	9,501	49.89%	49	0.26%
1932	9,422	47.45%	10,318	51.96%	117	0.59%
1936	11,521	56.26%	8,799	42.97%	158	0.77%
1940	11,446	54.61%	9,479	45.23%	33	0.16%
1944	9,225	53.25%	8,060	46.53%	39	0.23%
1948	8,993	55.17%	6,799	41.71%	510	3.13%
1952	12,212	64.89%	6,591	35.02%	17	0.09%
1956	13,003	71.33%	5,226	28.67%	0	0.00%
1960	9,385	48.48%	9,946	51.38%	27	0.14%
1964	4,846	27.96%	12,467	71.94%	16	0.09%
1968	8,314	53.29%	6,678	42.80%	610	3.91%
1972	10,959	67.40%	5,266	32.39%	35	0.22%
1976	8,846	54.77%	7,248	44.87%	58	0.36%
1980	7,620	46.77%	7,281	44.69%	1,391	8.54%
1984	10,617	62.22%	6,400	37.51%	47	0.28%
1988	9,135	53.14%	7,928	46.11%	129	0.75%
1992	6,635	36.13%	7,654	41.68%	4,076	22.19%
1996	5,072	30.94%	8,494	51.81%	2,828	17.25%
2000	7,643	43.80%	8,870	50.83%	938	5.38%
2004	8,383	45.77%	9,543	52.10%	390	2.13%
2008	6,676	38.11%	10,571	60.34%	273	1.56%
2012	5,740	36.02%	9,894	62.09%	300	1.88%
2016	8,221	48.50%	7,297	43.05%	1,434	8.46%
2020	9,668	50.18%	9,253	48.02%	347	1.80%
2024	10,569	54.32%	8,821	45.33%	68	0.35%

Franklin County typically voted Republican for presidential candidates, until the election of Bill Clinton in 1992. However, there was one notable exception to the county's longtime Republican dominance: in 1928, when New York Governor Al Smith, a Roman Catholic who appealed to the county's predominantly French Canadian population, narrowly carried the county over Republican Herbert Hoover despite Hoover's landslide victory nationwide. Clinton carried the county by a five-point margin in 1992, and increased his lead in 1996 with a more than 20-point victory. The county remained reliably Democratic for twenty years, giving Barack Obama margins of 22.2% in 2008 and 26.1% in 2012. In 2016, Donald Trump became the first Republican since 1988 to carry Franklin County. The county has continued to trend Republican, giving Trump a full majority in 2020, and Trump's improved performance in 2024 was the best for a Republican since 1984.

== See also ==
- North Country Community College
- Cure Cottages of Saranac Lake
- Adirondack Canoe Classic
- Hinchinbrooke River
- List of counties in New York
- National Register of Historic Places listings in Franklin County
- Church Street Historic District
- Adirondack County, New York - a proposed new county
