= Kiwassa Lake =

Lake In New York, USA

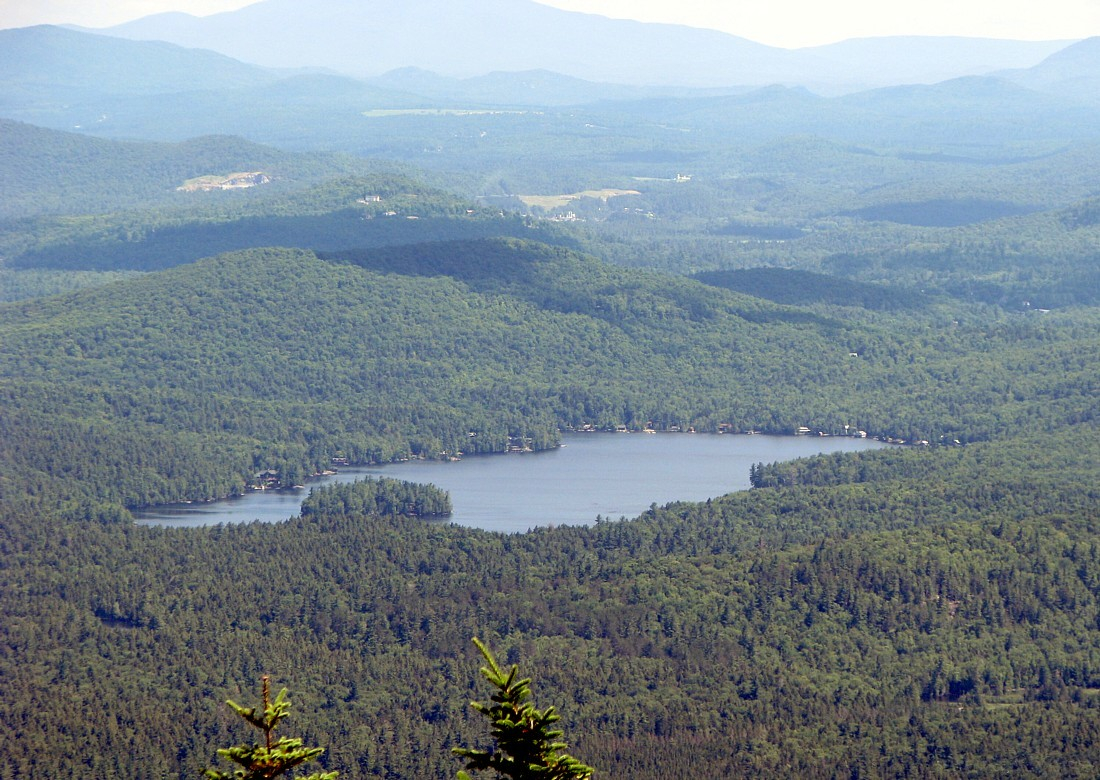
- Kiwassa Lake from Ampersand Mountain

- Location within New York Location within the United States
- Location: Adirondack Park, New York
- Coordinates: 44°17′38″N 74°09′32″W
- Primary outflows: Lake Oseetah
- Basin countries: United States
- Surface area: 280 acres (110 ha)
- Surface elevation: 1,529 ft (466 m)

Kiwassa Lake, originally called Lonesome Pond, is a 280-acre lake in the north-central Adirondack Park, south of Dewey Mountain, between Lower Saranac Lake and Oseetah Lake, two miles southwest of the village of Saranac Lake, New York, United States. It drains into Lake Oseetah, and thence into the Saranac River. The westernmost shore line is owned by New York State.
