= Saranac Lake =

Saranac Lake may refer to:

- Saranac Lake, New York, a village in the northern Adirondacks
- One of the three nearby Saranac Lakes, part of the Saranac River:
  - Upper Saranac Lake
  - Middle Saranac Lake
  - Lower Saranac Lake

Note: There is no lake named "Saranac Lake," so the name can properly refer only to the village of Saranac Lake.

== See also ==
- Saranac, New York, a village thirty miles northeast of Saranac Lake, on the Saranac River.
