= Stony Creek Mountain =

Mountain in New York, United States

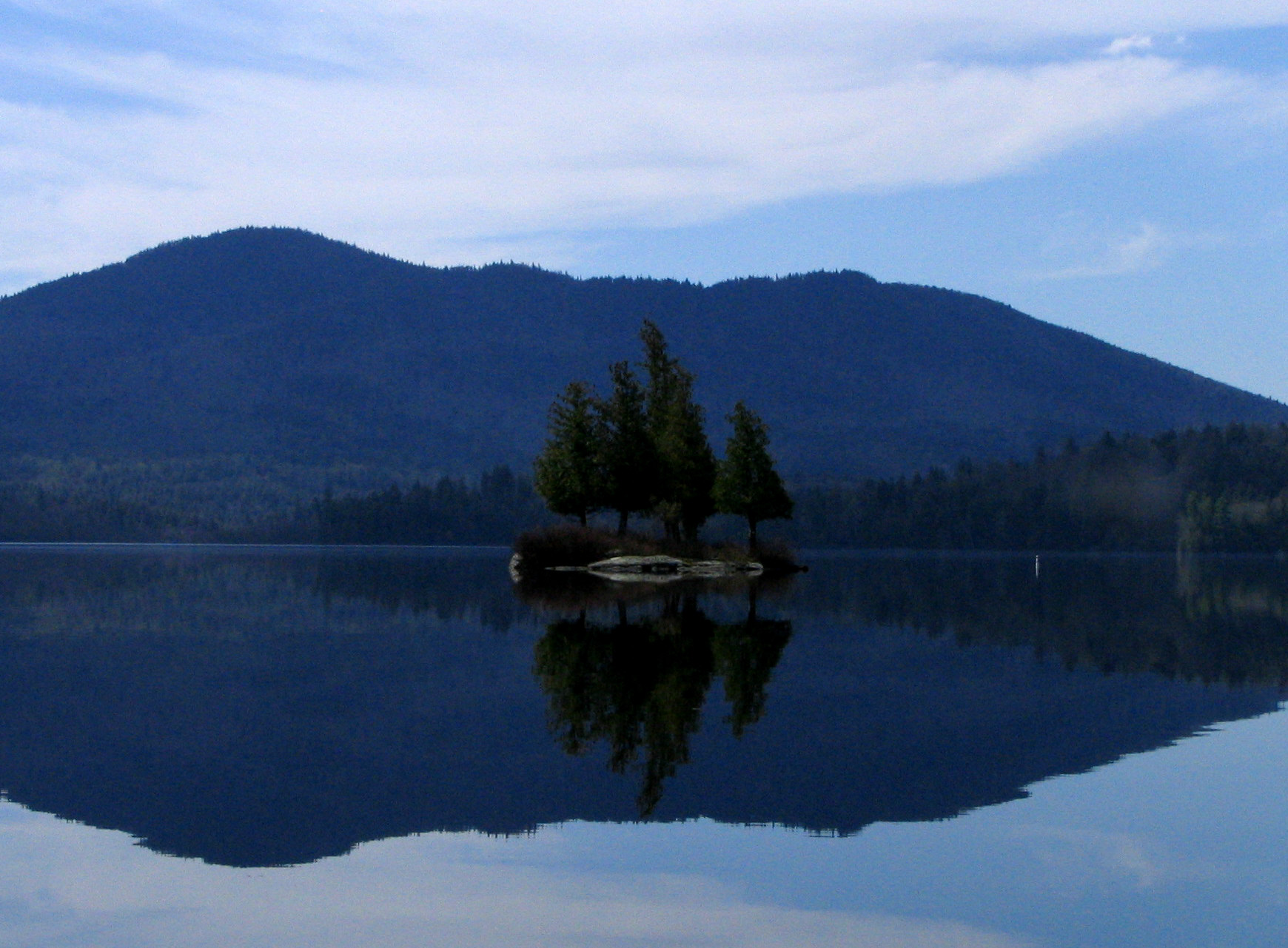
- Stony Creek Mountain from Middle Saranac Lake

Highest point
- Elevation: 2,986 ft (910 m)
- Prominence: 941 ft (287 m)
- Coordinates: 44°13′19″N 74°15′58″W

Geography
- Location within New York Adirondack Park Location within the United States
- Location: Coreys, Franklin County, New York
- Parent range: Adirondacks
- Topo map: USGS Stony Creek Mountain

Stony Creek Mountain is a 2,986 ft (910.1 m) mountain located west of the Hamlet of Coreys in Franklin County in the northeastern Adirondacks, in New York. It is named after the nearby Stony Creek Ponds and Stony Creek, which are located to the west. Ampersand Mountain is located east-northeast and Middle Saranac Lake is located north of Stony Creek Mountain.
