= Oseetah Lake =

Lake in Franklin County, New York, USA

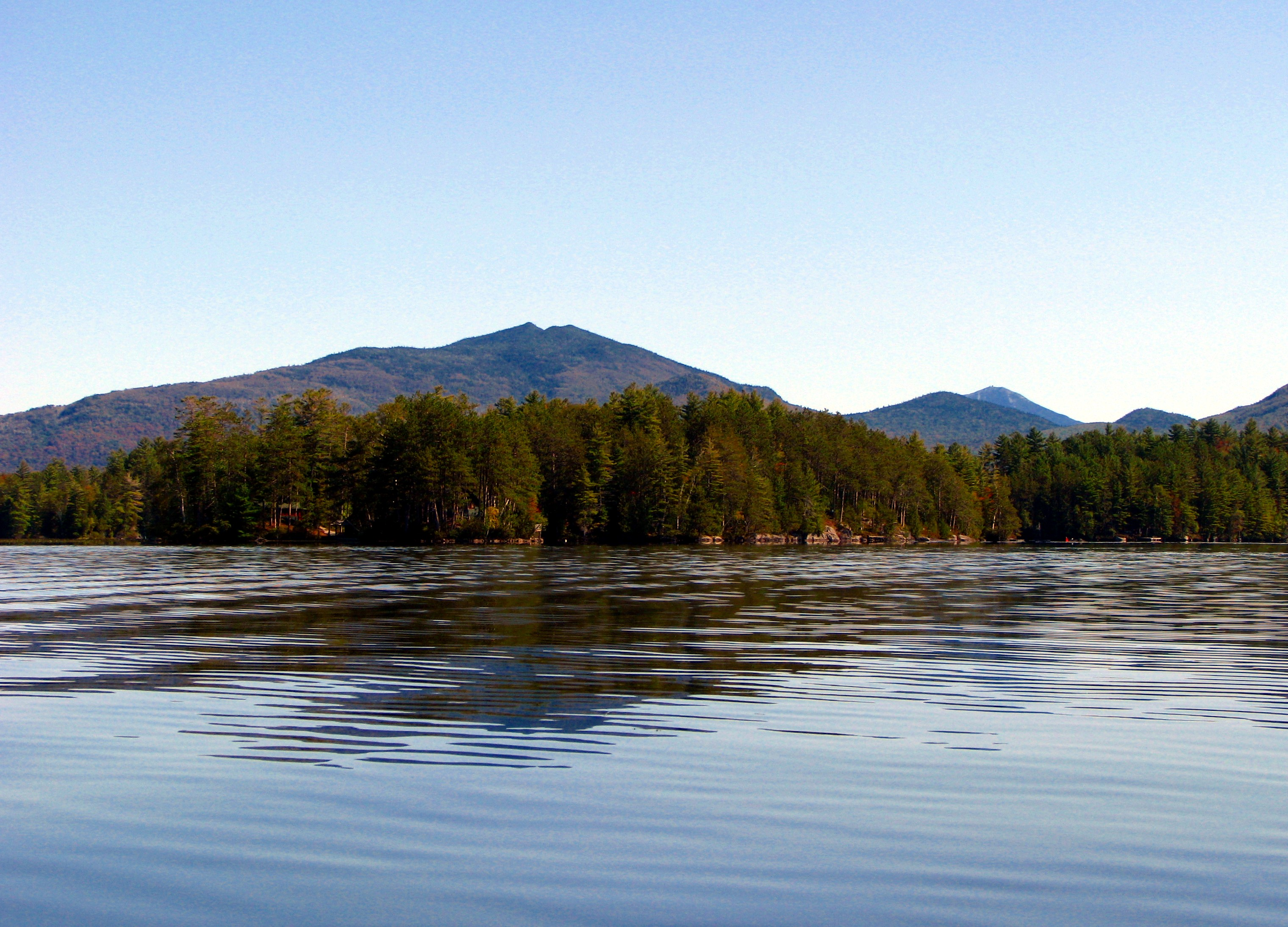
- McKenzie Mountain from the lake

- Location within New York
- Location: Adirondack State Park, Franklin / Essex counties, New York, US
- Coordinates: 44°16′55″N 74°8′8″W
- Primary inflows: Saranac River
- Primary outflows: Saranac River
- Basin countries: United States
- Surface area: 826 acres (3.34 km^{2})
- Average depth: 3 ft (0.91 m)
- Surface elevation: 1,529 ft (466 m)

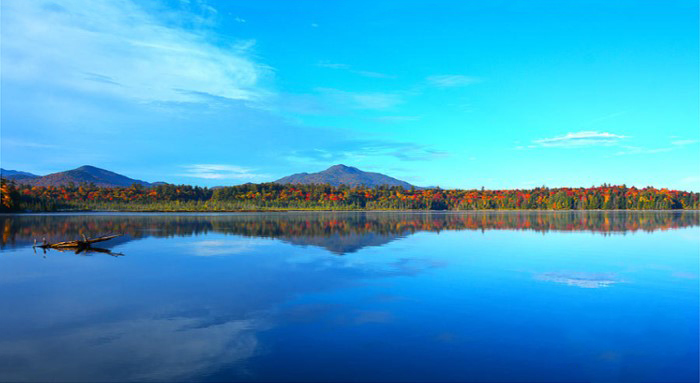
Ampersand Mountain from Oseetah Lake NY Early Fall By Christine Dekkers

Oseetah Lake is an 826-acre (3.34 km^{2}) lake with a mean depth of three feet (0.91 m). It is in New York State's Adirondack Park, two and a half miles (4.0 km) south of the village of Saranac Lake on the Saranac River. It is located mostly in the town of Harrietstown, but its easternmost portion extends into the town of North Elba.

== Description ==
The Saranac River departs the lower locks below Lower Saranac Lake and flows northeast into Oseetah Lake. The river exits Oseetah at the north end of the lake and flows northeast to Lake Flower and Saranac Lake. Oseetah is also fed by Kiwassa Lake. Principal islands in Oseetah Lake are Wayotah, Wapiti, Watch, Two Sisters, Papoose and Birch. Its shoreline is mostly privately held.

It is part of the route of the Adirondack Canoe Classic, also known as the Ninety-miler, along with the 740-mile (1,190 km) Northern Forest Canoe Trail that runs from Old Forge, New York to Fort Kent, Maine.

== History ==
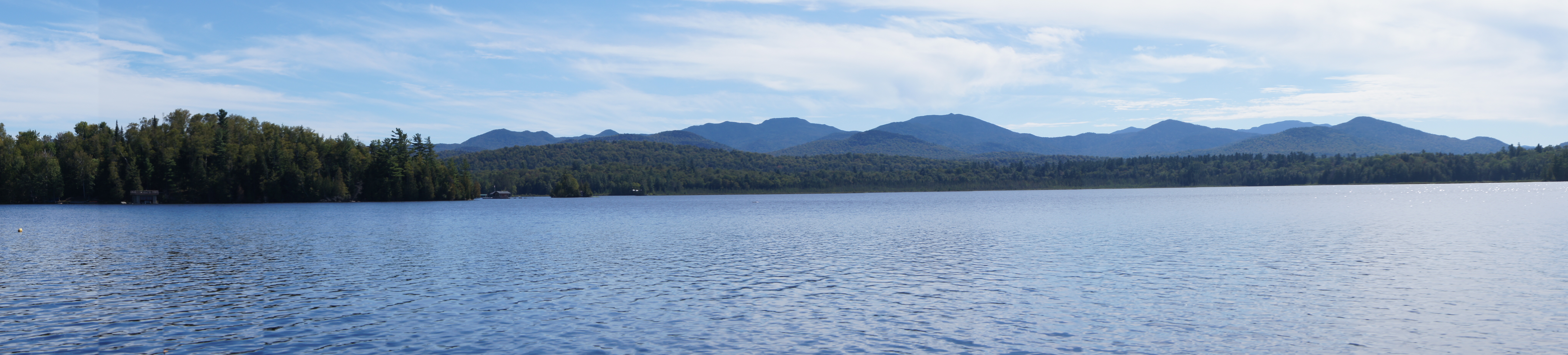
Looking south across Oseetah Lake toward the Sawtooth Mountains

According to legend, Oseetah was an Indian Princess. Upon learning the Indian chief she loved (Wayotah) was betrothed to another, she threw herself off a cliff into a lake and was magically transformed into a water lily. In the Huron language Oseetah means "Water Lily".

Originally named Miller Pond, Oseetah Lake was formed when the dam across the Saranac River at Saranac Lake, that also forms Lake Flower, was raised to generate electric power by the Saranac Light and Power Company in 1894 (purchased by Paul Smith in 1904). At that time, as shown by maps of the period, a smaller pond, Ray Pond, also became part of the new, larger Oseetah - in what is now the eastern portion of the lake near the Essex County line.
