= Bloomingdale, New York =

Hamlet in New York, United States

Coordinates: 44°24′28″N 74°5′15″W

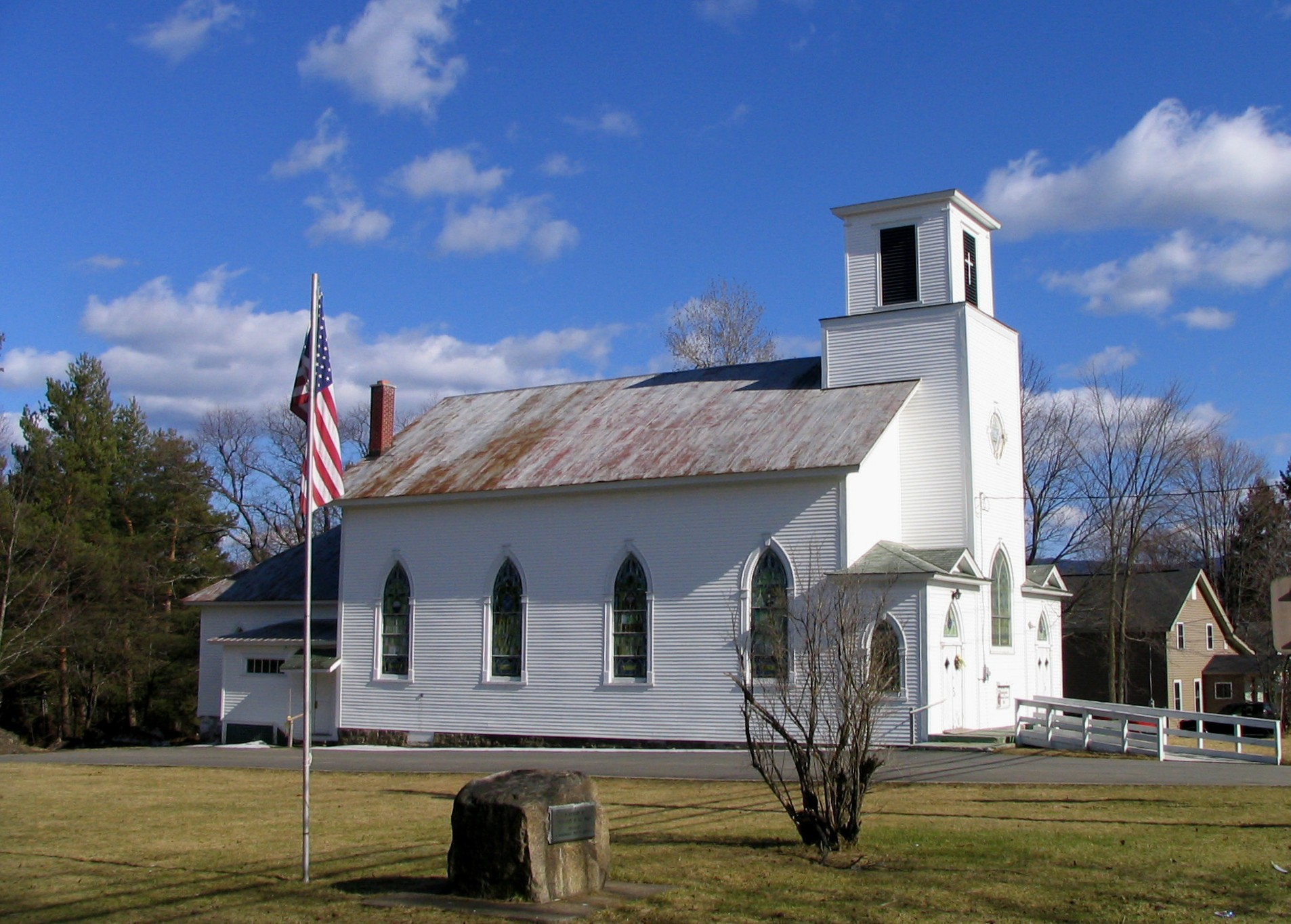
The United Methodist Church in Bloomingdale

Bloomingdale is a hamlet located in the town of St. Armand, Essex County, in the State of New York, United States. The United States Postal Service has assigned Bloomingdale the ZIP Code 12913.

== History ==
Bloomingdale was incorporated as a village in 1852 and became the center of a thriving lumbering business soon after. Although the industry went into a decline in the 20th century, Bloomingdale's location on the Saranac River and at the junction of five roads, including New York State Route 3, helped it to maintain an active community. The hamlet has an elementary school, general store, antique shop and restaurant, many of which have been serving the community for years. The Town Hall is the center of government and community activities. In 1985, the villagers voted in favor of a bill to dissolve the village. Village government formally dissolved in 1992.

In 1900, Daniel Seckington put in a nine-hole golf course in connection with his hotel, the Waverly House; this was one of the earliest golf courses in Essex County.
