= Franklin Falls Pond =

Lake in New York state, U.S.

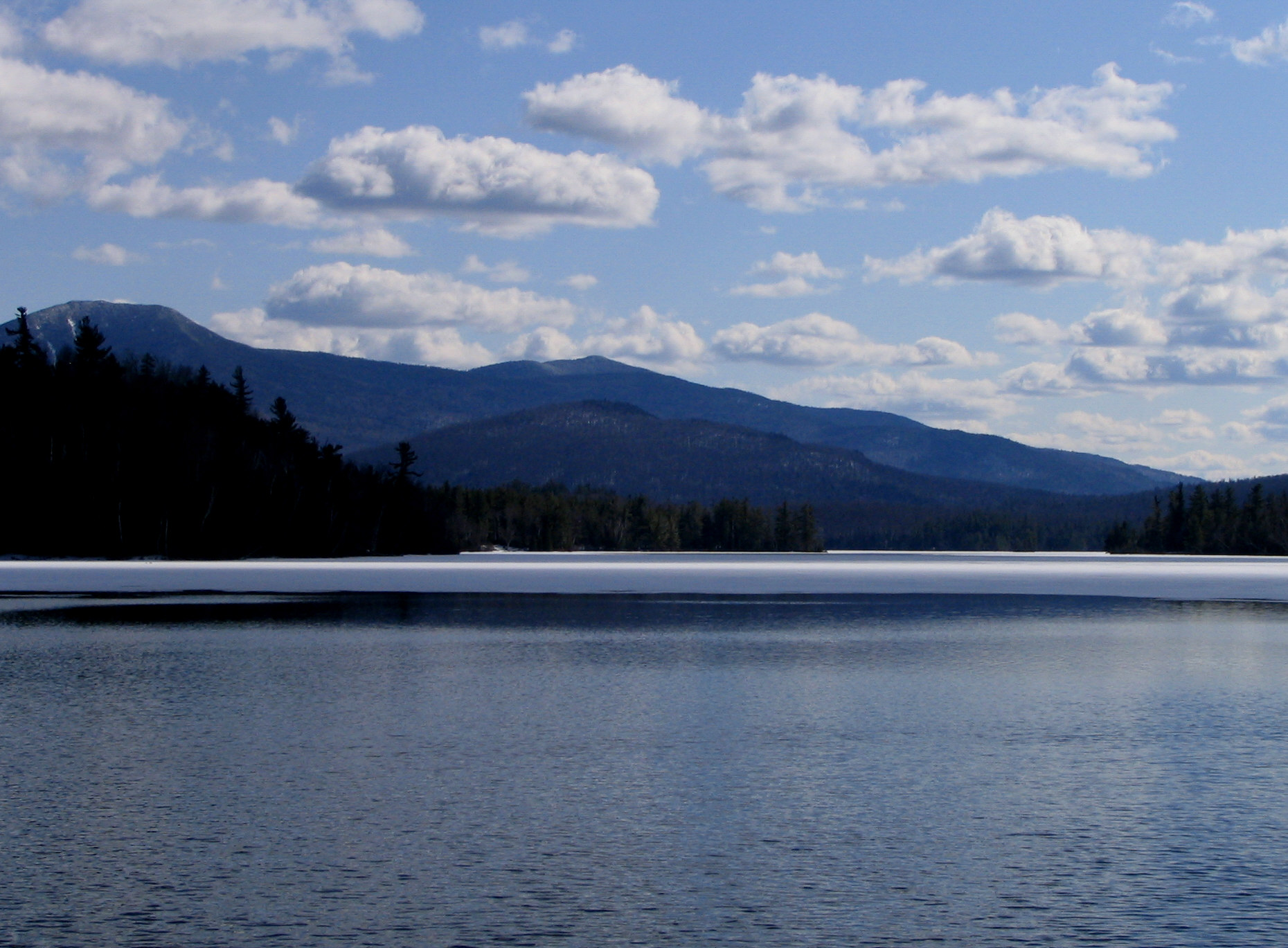
- Franklin Falls Pond, upstream of the Falls

- Location within New York Location within the United States
- Location: St. Armand / Franklin, New York, United States
- Coordinates: 44°25.5′N 73°59′W
- Primary inflows: Saranac River
- Primary outflows: Saranac River
- Basin countries: United States
- Max. length: 2.7 miles (4.3 km)
- Surface area: 439 acres (1.78 km^{2})
- Surface elevation: 1,470 feet (450 m)

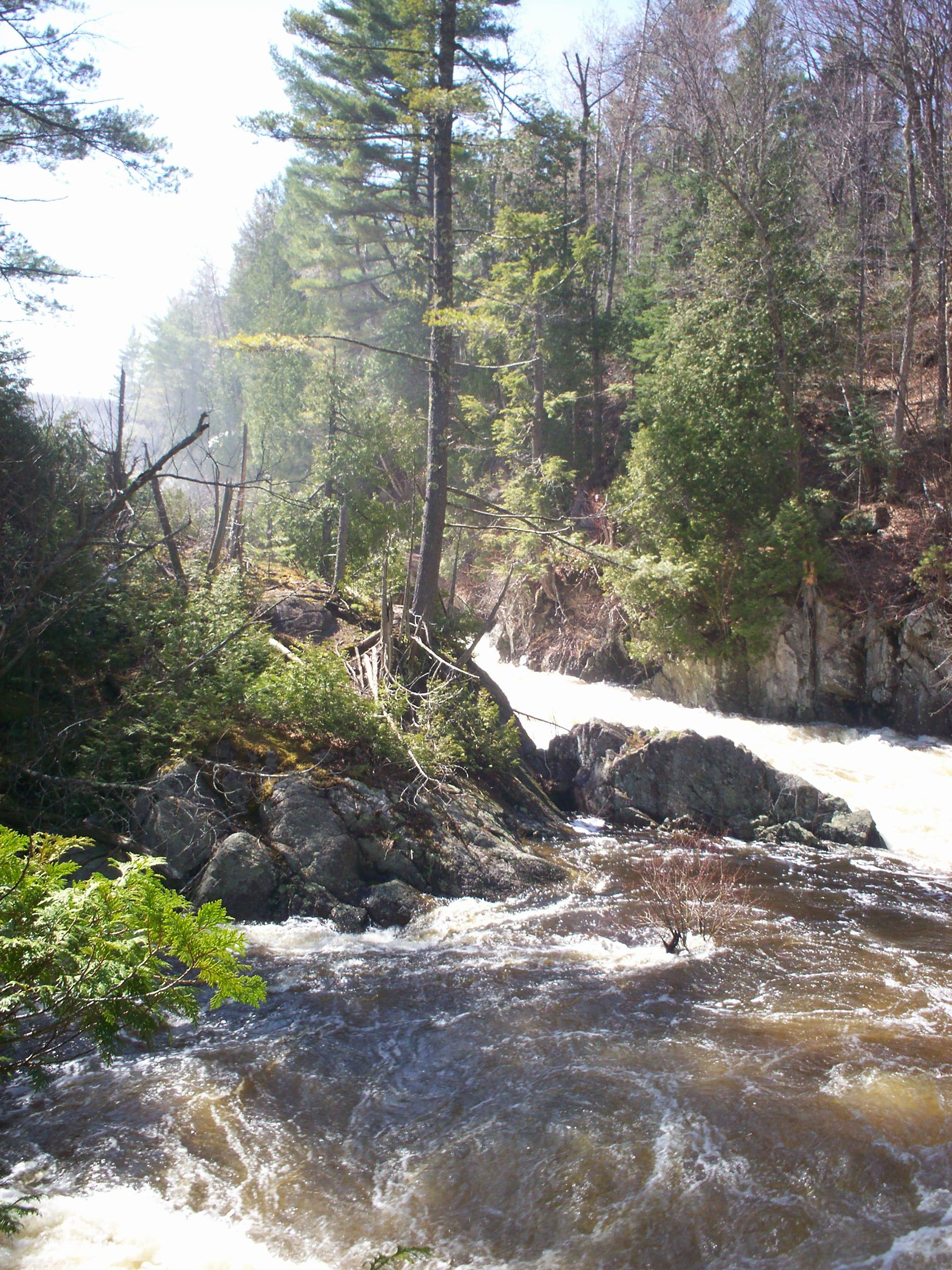
Franklin Falls in the spring

Franklin Falls Pond is a 439-acre (178 ha), 2.7-mile-long (4.3 km) pond created by damming the Saranac River three miles (4.8 km) northeast of Lower Saranac Lake in the Adirondack Mountains of northern New York State. The pond is also part of the 740-mile (1,190 km) Northern Forest Canoe Trail, which begins in Old Forge, NY and ends in Fort Kent, ME.

== History ==
The falls at the downstream (northern) end of the pond were the site of a sawmill, a hotel, and a hamlet that grew up around the mill; all were completely destroyed by a fire in 1852. The hotel and the sawmill were rebuilt. Paul Smith, proprietor of Paul Smith's Hotel bought the area around the falls and built a hydroelectric plant, the construction of which flooded 270 acres (1.1 km^{2}), killing a substantial number of trees. The state filed an injunction against the construction, which Smith ignored, leading the Association for the Protection of the Adirondacks to bring a suit that was finally settled in 1912, in Smith's favor. Today all that remains of the hamlet is a more modern hydroelectric dam that holds back the pond.

== Sources ==
- Jamieson, Paul and Morris, Donald, Adirondack Canoe Waters, North Flow, Lake George, NY: Adirondack Mountain Club, 1987. ISBN 0-935272-43-7.
