= St. Armand, New York =

- Town
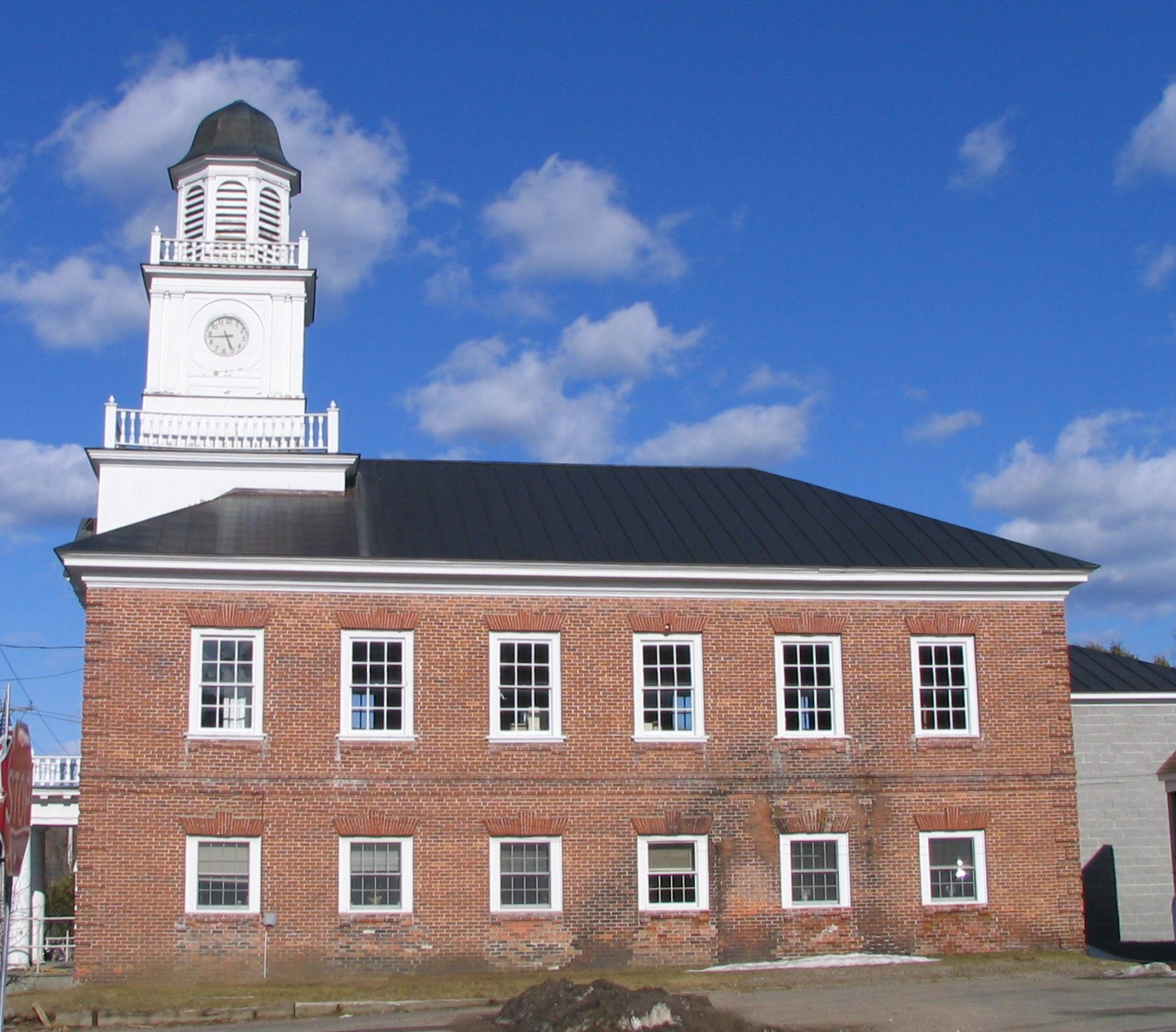
- St. Armand Town Hall in Bloomingdale, New York

- Location in Essex County and the state of New York
- Coordinates: 44°23′49″N 74°3′34″W
- Country: United States
- State: New York
- County: Essex

Government
  - Type: Town Council
  - Town Supervisor: Joyce W. Morency (R)
  - Town Council: Members' List: • Thomas C. Jones (D); • Samuel A. Grimone (R); • Earl Dakin, Jr. (R); • Paul Woodruff (R)

Area
  - Total: 57.44 sq mi (148.78 km^{2})
  - Land: 56.51 sq mi (146.36 km^{2})
  - Water: 0.93 sq mi (2.42 km^{2})
- Elevation: 1,549 ft (472 m)

Population (2020)
  - Total: 1,446
- Time zone: UTC-5 (Eastern (EST))
  - Summer (DST): UTC-4 (EDT)
- ZIP Codes: 12983 (Saranac Lake); 12913 (Bloomingdale)
- FIPS code: 36-031-64529
- GNIS feature ID: 0979447
- Website: townofstarmandny.gov

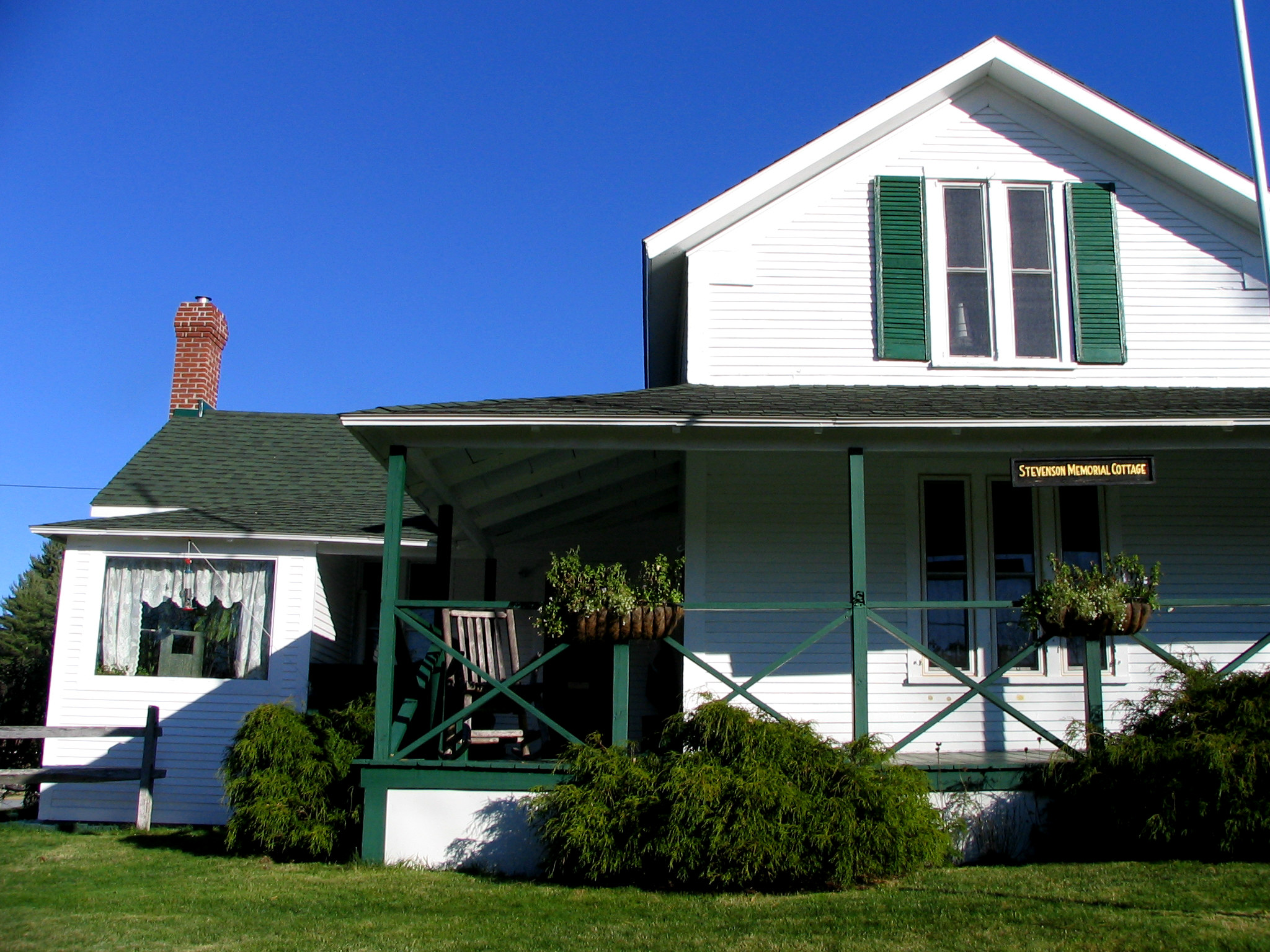
Robert Louis Stevenson's "Cure Cottage"

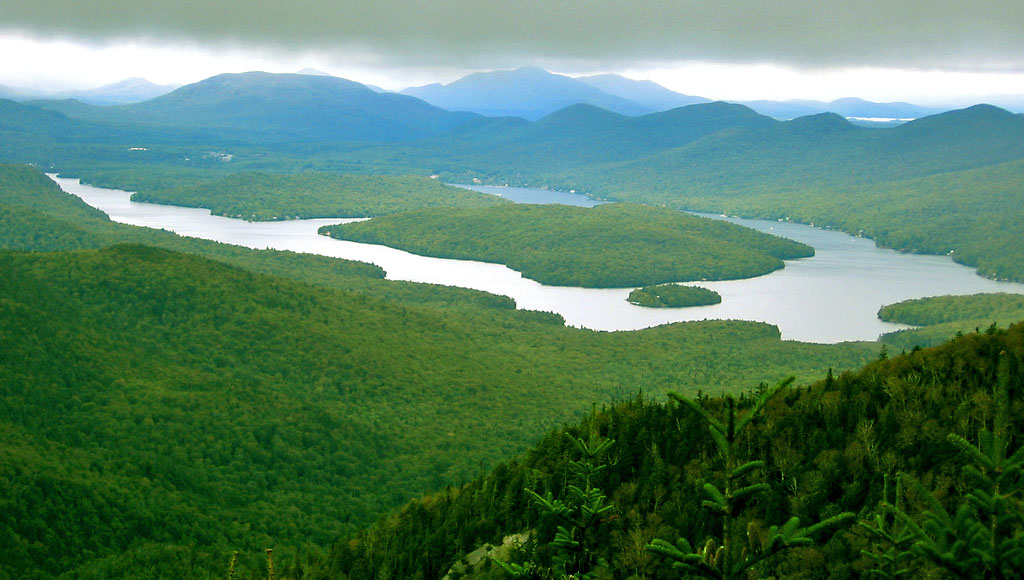
Lake Placid from Whiteface Mountain

St. Armand is a town in Essex County, New York, United States. The population was 1,446 at the 2020 census. The town was named by an early settler for Saint-Armand, Quebec, in Canada.

The town of St. Armand is in the northwestern corner of the county and is southwest of Plattsburgh.

== History ==
The town was first settled circa 1829. The early industry was based on lumber production. After most of the trees were harvested, farming became predominant. Because the town was set at the conjunction of five roads, including New York Route 3, it became an active community.

The town was set off from the town of Wilmington in 1844.

By the end of the 19th century, the town had become the locale for sanatoria intended for tuberculosis (TB) cures. Dr. Edward Trudeau, in 1884, was one of the first to establish a sanatorium within the town, near the village of Saranac Lake.

== Notable person ==
- Robert Louis Stevenson, author, spent one year in St. Armand for a TB cure

== Geography ==
According to the United States Census Bureau, the town has a total area of 57.5 square miles (148.8 km^{2}), of which 56.5 square miles (146.4 km^{2}) is land and 0.93 square miles (2.4 km^{2}), or 1.63%, is water.

The northern and eastern town lines are the border of Franklin County. The town is in the Adirondack Park. The Saranac River flows through the northwestern part of St. Armand.

New York State Route 3 passes through the western part of the town.

== Demographics ==
Historical population
Census	Pop.	Note	%±
1850	210		—
1860	331		57.6%
1870	335		1.2%
1880	452		34.9%
1890	633		40.0%
1900	769		21.5%
1910	746		−3.0%
1920	727		−2.5%
1930	1,190		63.7%
1940	1,233		3.6%
1950	1,142		−7.4%
1960	868		−24.0%
1970	903		4.0%
1980	1,064		17.8%
1990	1,318		23.9%
2000	1,759		33.5%
2010	1,548		−12.0%
2020	1,446		−6.6%
U.S. Decennial Census

At the 2000 census, there were 1,321 people, 543 households and 349 families residing in the town. The population density was 23.4 inhabitants per square mile (9.0/km^{2}). There were 689 housing units at an average density of 12.2 per square mile (4.7/km^{2}). The racial makeup of the town was 97.43% White, 0.38% African American, 0.61% Native American, 0.23% Asian, 0.61% from other races, and 0.76% from two or more races. Hispanic or Latino of any race were 1.14% of the population.

There were 543 households, of which 32.4% had children under the age of 18 living with them, 55.1% were married couples living together, 7.7% had a female householder with no husband present, and 35.7% were non-families. 28.2% of all households were made up of individuals, and 13.4% had someone living alone who was 65 years of age or older. The average household size was 2.43 and the average family size was 3.04.

Age distribution was 25.8% under the age of 18, 6.3% from 18 to 24, 29.1% from 25 to 44, 26.6% from 45 to 64, and 12.3% who were 65 years of age or older. The median age was 39 years. For every 100 females, there were 98.1 males. For every 100 females age 18 and over, there were 90.7 males.

The median household income was $39,500, and the median family income was $51,250. Males had a median income of $36,696 versus $23,828 for females. The per capita income for the town was $18,828. About 4.0% of families and 8.1% of the population were below the poverty line, including 9.6% of those under age 18 and 11.0% of those age 65 or over.

== Communities and locations in St. Armand ==
- Bloomingdale – A hamlet near the northern town line on NY-3. The community was founded circa 1852.
- Camp Woodsmoke – A youth camp formerly located at the northern end of Lake Placid.
- Franklin Falls Pond – A wide part of the Saranac River at the northern town boundary.
- Lake Placid – A small part of the northern end of the lake is within the town.
- Moose Pond – A small lake in the western part of St. Armand.
- Saranac Lake – A small part of the village of Saranac Lake is in the southwestern part of the town.
- St. Armand – A location near the northern town line on NY-3.
- Trudeau – A hamlet northeast of Saranac Lake village on NY-3, named for Dr. Edward Livingston Trudeau.
