= Weller Pond =

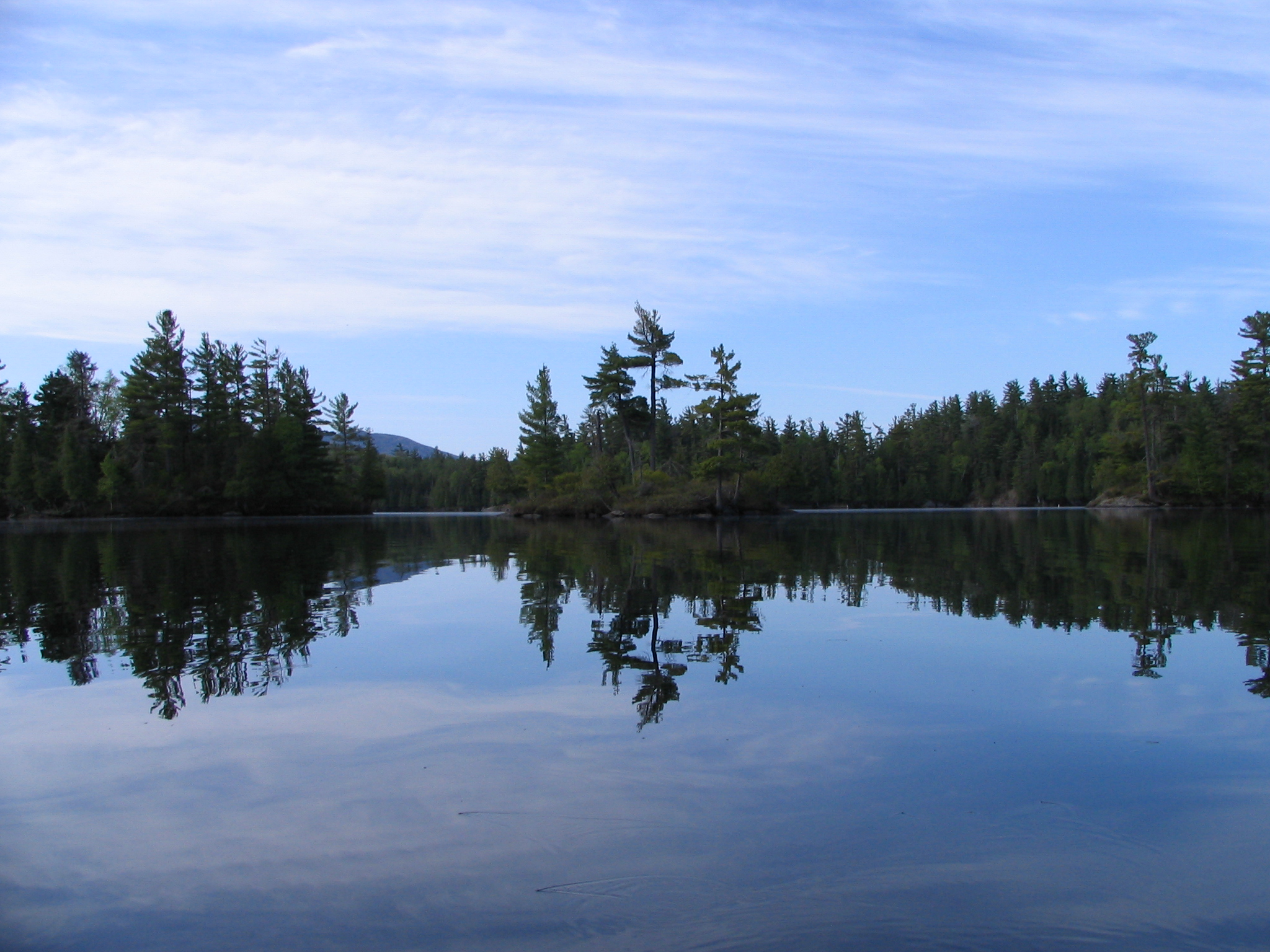
- Two of the small islands on Weller Pond

- Location within New York
- Location: Franklin County, New York
- Coordinates: 44°17′04″N 74°16′48″W
- Type: lake
- Surface area: 177-acre (72 ha)
- Surface elevation: 1,539 feet (469 m)

Weller Pond is a 177-acre (72 ha) wilderness pond 8 miles (13 km) southwest of the village of Saranac Lake in the Adirondacks in northern New York within Franklin County. The lake is found at an elevation of 1,539 feet (469 m). It is connected to Middle Saranac Lake and is entirely state-owned. It sits in the shadow of Boot Bay Mountain; there is a canoe carry to Upper Saranac Lake. It is a popular paddling and cross-country skiing destination.

There are five public campsites on the pond, which are part of the Saranac Islands Public Campground. Weller Pond was made famous by Martha Reben's The Healing Woods, a memoir of her experiences camping on its shore in 1931 while attempting a self-cure of tuberculosis.
