= Ampersand Mountain =

Mountain in New York state, United States

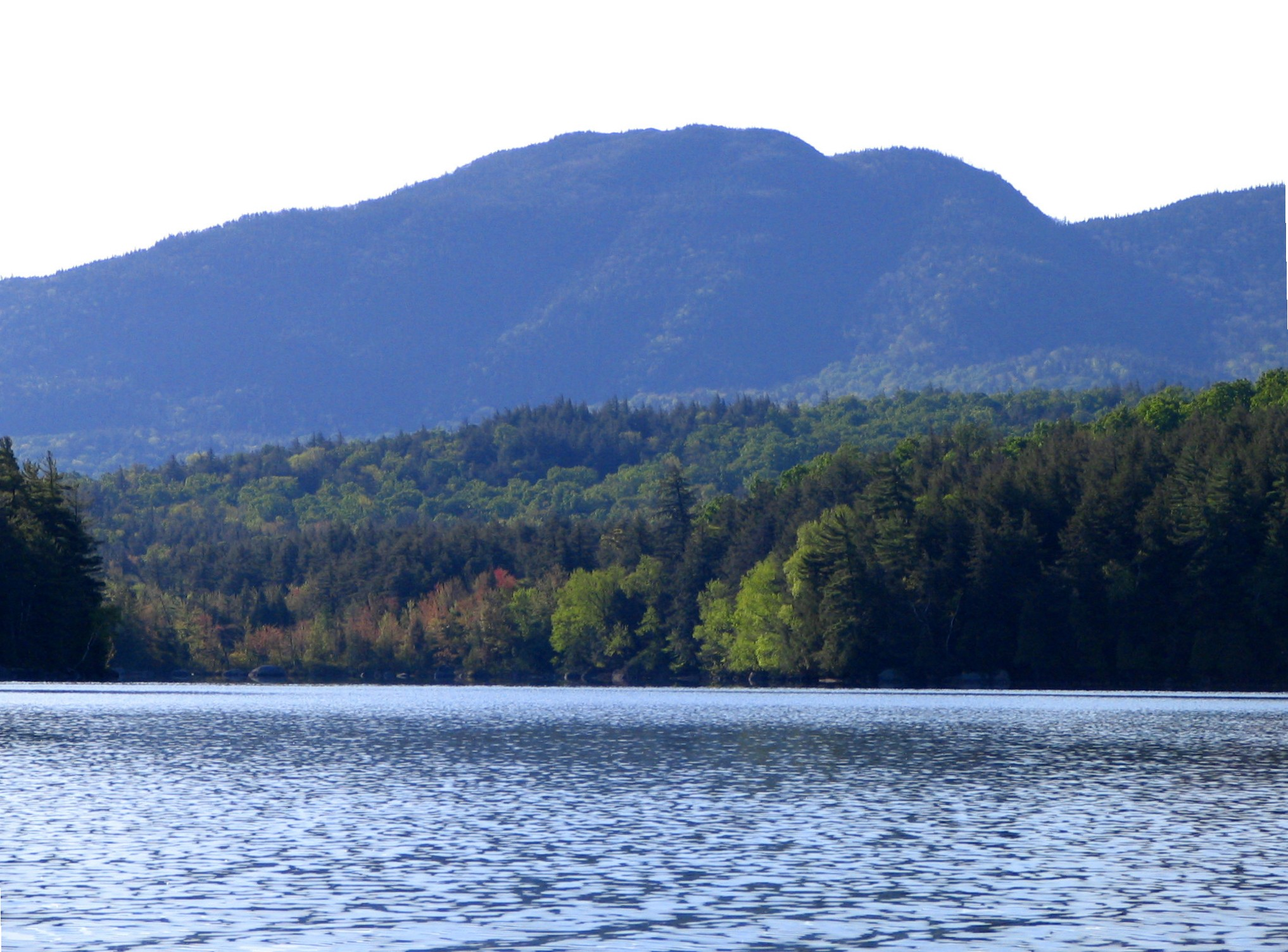
- Ampersand Mountain from Middle Saranac Lake

Highest point
- Elevation: 3,353 ft (1,022 m)
- Prominence: 1,313 ft (400 m)
- Coordinates: 44°14′04″N 74°12′10″W

Geography
- Location within New York Adirondack Park Location within the United States
- Location: Harrietstown, New York, U.S.
- Parent range: Adirondacks
- Topo map: USGS Ampersand Mountain

Climbing
- First ascent: Dr. W. W. Ely, in 1872

Ampersand Mountain is a 3,352 ft (1,021.7 m) mountain in Franklin County in the High Peaks Wilderness Area of the northeastern Adirondacks, west of the High Peaks proper in New York State. The trail up the mountain begins on New York State Route 3 8.1 miles (13.0 km) southwest of the village of Saranac Lake, near Middle Saranac Lake; it is a popular day hike. The mountain takes its name from nearby Ampersand Creek, so named—according to some interpretations—because it twists and turns like the ampersand symbol. The summit is bare rock, with extensive views of the High Peaks to the east and the Saranac Lakes to the west. Stony Creek Mountain is located west-southwest of Ampersand Mountain. The mountain is notable as the land surrounding its hiking trail's initial ascent is generally acknowledged as unlogged old growth forest.

== History ==
W.W. Ely made the first recorded ascent of Ampersand Mountain in 1872. Ely and Dr. William Reed and three others later cleared the summit of trees, and built a lean-to. The following year, Verplanck Colvin cleared the remaining trees while working on his survey of the Adirondacks, and subsequent fires and erosion left the summit bare. Colvin credits Ely for the mountain's name. New York State built a fire lookout station on the summit in 1911, although a fire tower was deemed unnecessary due to the open views available. By 1920, tree growth was such that a 22-foot-tall (6.7 m) steel Aermotor LS40 fire tower was purchased and erected in 1921. The tower was used until 1970, when the New York State Department of Environmental Conservation closed it, as it had become more cost-effective to spot fires using aircraft. The tower was removed in July, 1977. There is a memorial near the summit to hermit Walter Channing Rice, who manned the fire tower from 1915 to 1923.

Ampersand was the first mountain that wilderness activist and explorer Bob Marshall climbed, in 1915, when he was 14. In 1925, Marshall, his brother George and Herbert K. Clark became the first to climb all 46 of the Adirondack peaks over 4,000 ft (1,200 m), becoming the first Adirondack Forty-Sixers.

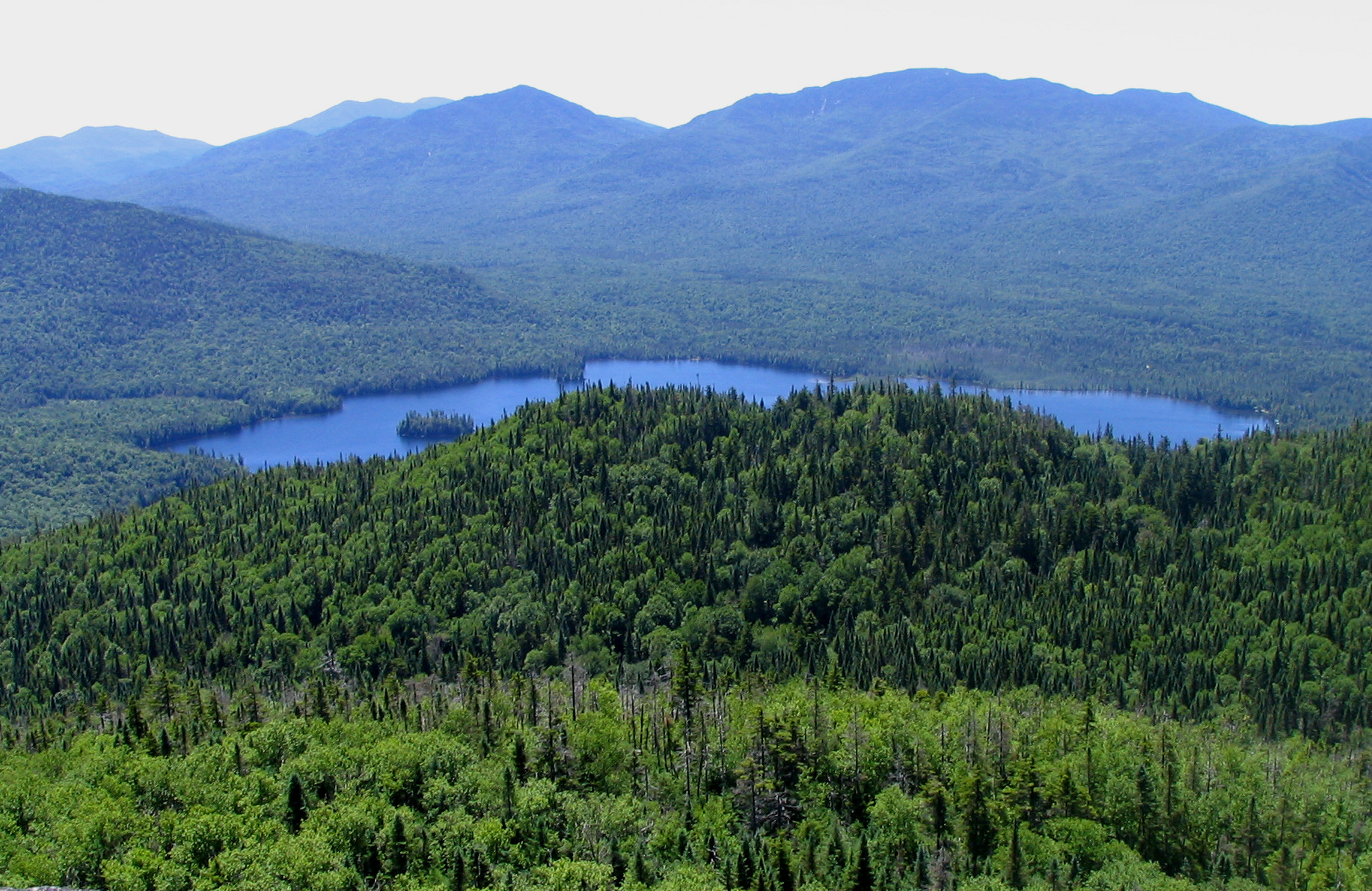
View of Ampersand Lake and the High Peaks to the east

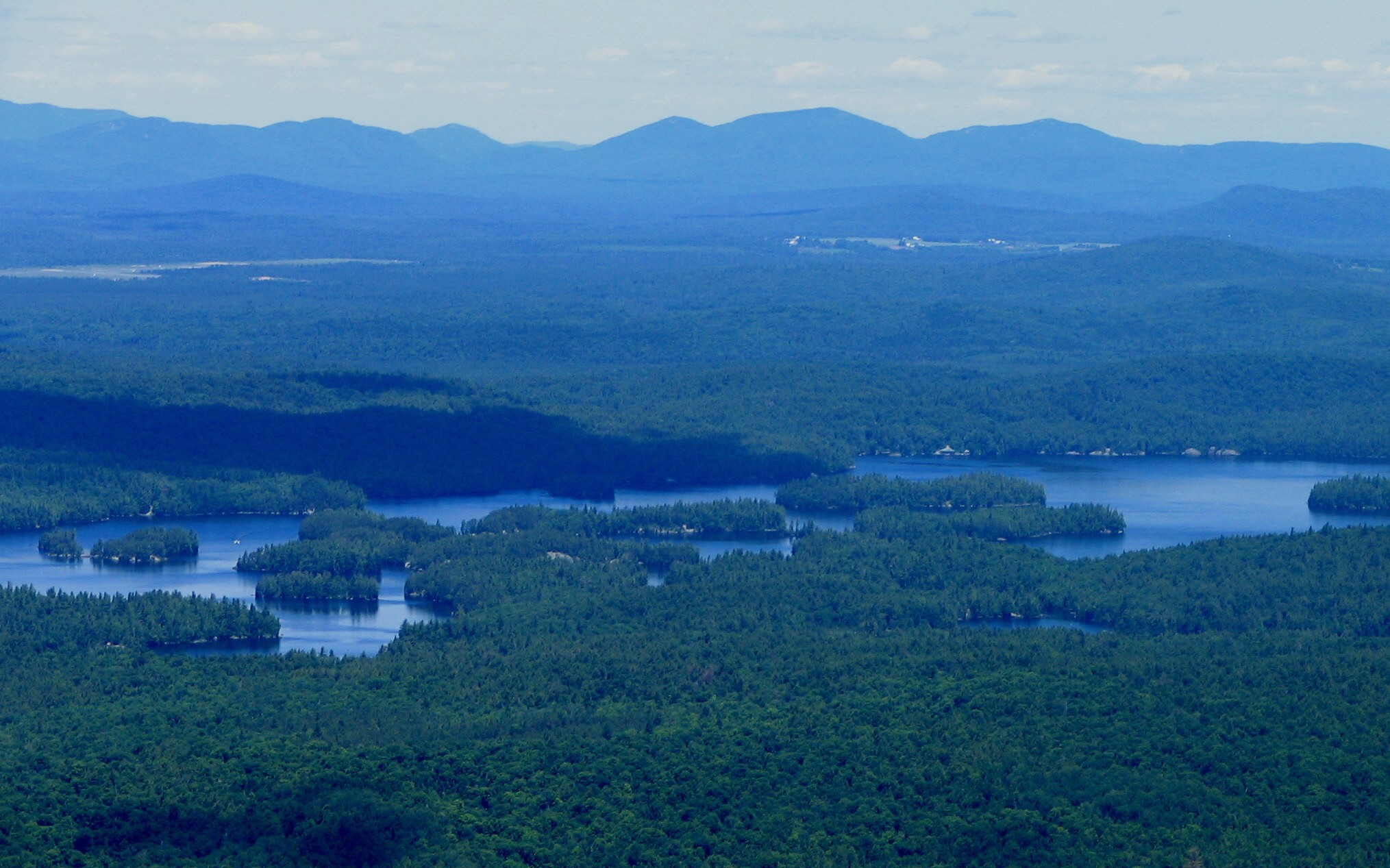
View of Lower Saranac Lake to the north.

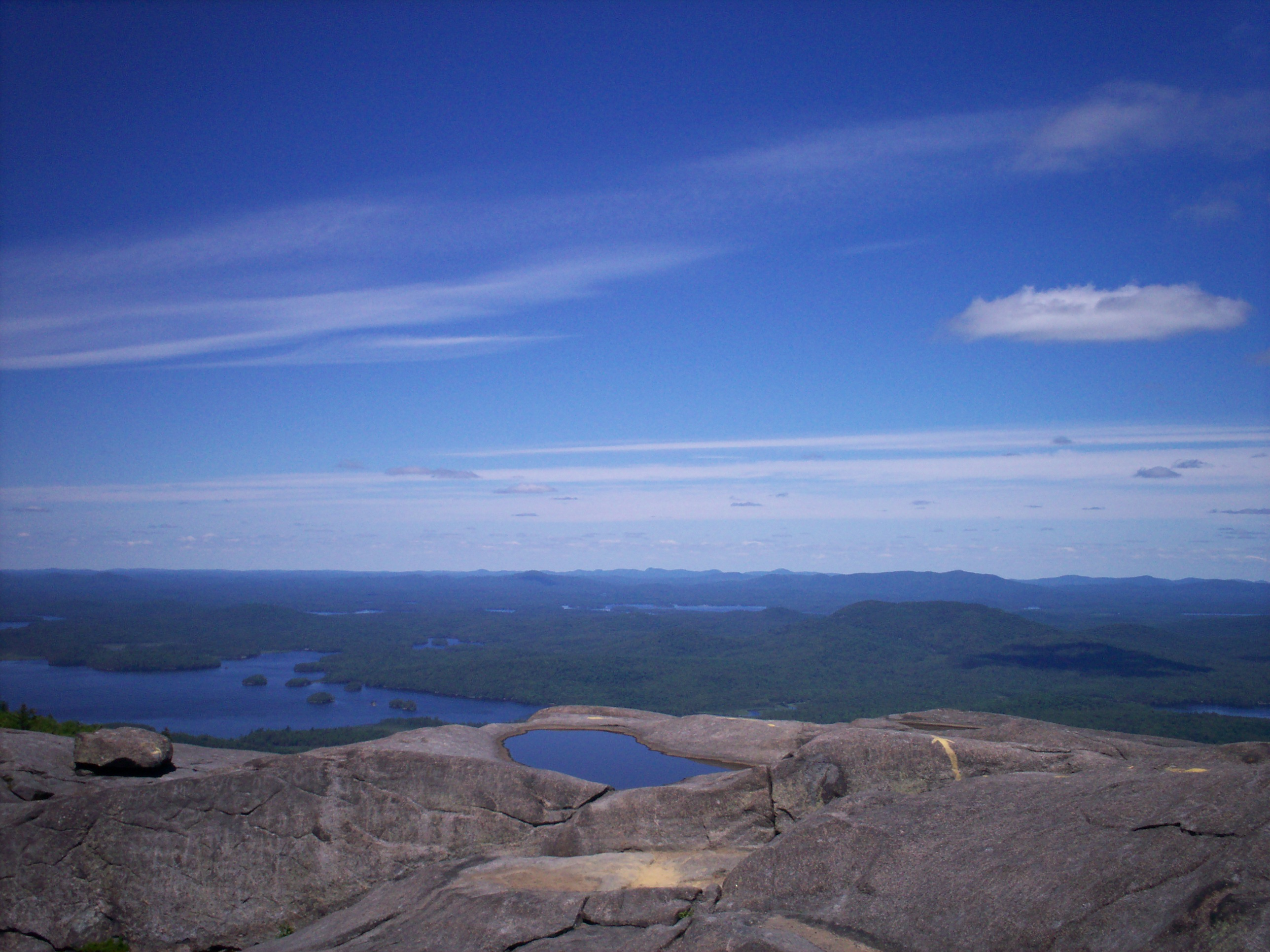
Northwest view from Ampersand of Middle Saranac Lake (left), with Weller Pond directly above. Upper Saranac Lake is just visible at top, and Lower Saranac Lake at far right.

== See also ==
- List of mountains in New York
