= Northern Forest Canoe Trail =

Canoeing trail in the United States and Canada

Coordinates: 44°47.5′N 71°2.5′W

- Length: 740 mi (1,190 km)
- Location: Northeastern United States
- Trailheads: Old Forge, New York; Fort Kent, Maine
- Use: Canoeing
- Difficulty: Moderate to Strenuous
- Season: Summer to Fall
- Sights: Adirondack Mountains
- Hazards: Severe Weather; Class III, IV white water

The Northern Forest Canoe Trail (NFCT) is a 740-mile (1,190 km) marked canoeing trail in the northeastern United States and Canada, extending from Old Forge in the Adirondacks of New York to Fort Kent, Maine. Along the way, the trail also passes through the states and provinces of Vermont, Quebec, and New Hampshire. The trail was opened on June 3, 2006.

== Overview ==
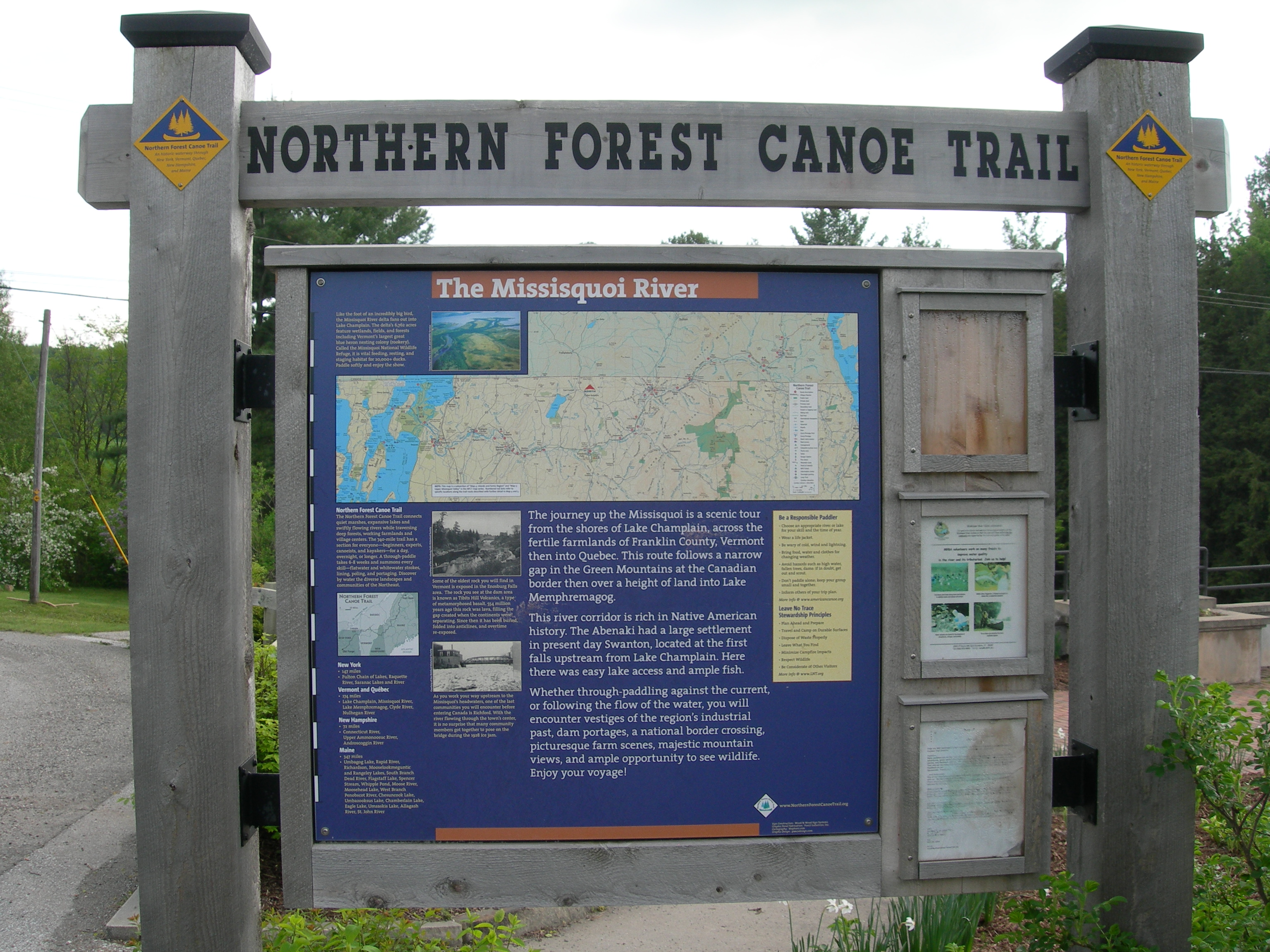
Northern Forest Canoe Trail (NFCT) sign

The trail has been likened to a water version of the Appalachian Trail, and there are many similarities: both are long-distance trails that most people will use for day trips or short overnight trips. Many of those who paddle the entire trail will do so in sections. Unlike the AT, the NFCT obtains access for campsites and portages through landowner permission rather than through land protection. Also, many sections of the trail require a high level of skill to complete.

The trail is divided into 13 sections: Adirondack Country (West) New York, Adirondack North Country (Central) New York, Adirondack Country (East) New York, Islands and Farms Region Vermont, Upper Missisquoi Valley Vermont/Quebec, Northeast Kingdom Quebec/Vermont, Great North Woods New Hampshire, Rangeley Lakes Region Maine, Flagstaff Region Maine, Greater Jackman Region Maine, Moosehead/Penobscot Region Maine, Allagash Region (South) Maine, and Allagash Region (North) Maine. Each of these sections has been mapped and documented in order to establish the trail.

Trail towns include Old Forge, Richford, Vermont, The Errol-Berlin Corridor, New Hampshire and Rangeley, Maine. In Maine it primarily traverses through the North Maine Woods region

The trail covers 58 lakes and ponds, 22 rivers and streams, and 63 "carries" (portages) totaling 53 miles (85 km). On some sections of the trail, portage trails, campsites, and access areas are marked with Northern Forest Canoe Trail medallions, a yellow diamond with blue lettering.

The American Canoe Association has named the NFCT an ACA-Recommended Water Trail.

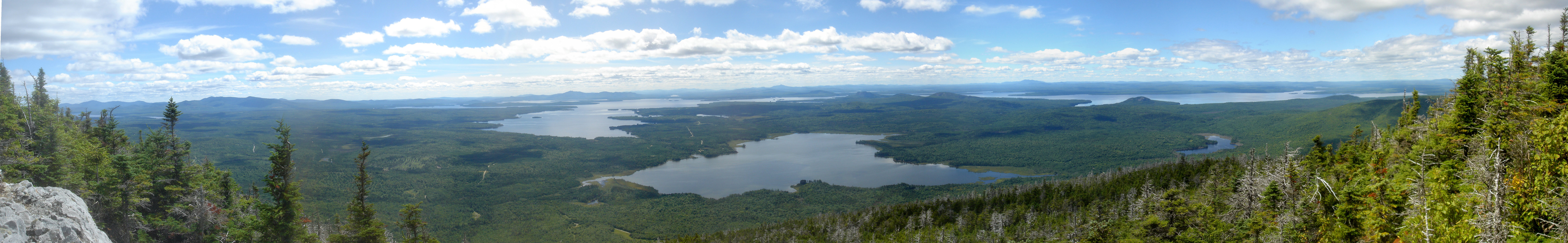
Spencer Pond and Moosehead Lake, Maine, from Little Spencer Mountain

== Bodies of water ==
=== New York (147 mi.) ===
- Fulton Chain of Lakes
- Brown's Tract Inlet
- Raquette Lake
- Forked Lake
- Raquette River
- Long Lake
- Stony Creek Ponds
- Upper, Middle, and Lower Saranac Lakes
- Oseetah Lake
- Franklin Falls Pond
- Union Falls Pond
- Saranac River
- Lake Champlain

=== Vermont & Québec (174 mi.) ===
- Lake Champlain
- Missisquoi River
- North Branch Missisquoi River
- Lake Memphremagog
- Clyde River
- Clyde Pond
- Salem Lake
- Charleston Pond
- Pensioner Pond
- Island Pond
- Spectacle Pond
- Nulhegan Pond
- Nulhegan River

=== New Hampshire (72 mi.) ===
- Connecticut River
- Upper Ammonoosuc River
- Androscoggin River
- Pontook Reservoir
- Umbagog Lake

=== Maine (374 mi.) ===
- Umbagog Lake
- Rapid River
- Upper and Lower Richardson Lakes
- Mooselookmeguntic Lake
- Rangeley Lake
- Haley Pond
- South Branch Dead River
- Flagstaff Lake
- Dead River
- Spencer Stream
- Spencer Lake
- Fish Pond
- Attean Pond
- Big Wood Pond
- Moose River
- Long Pond
- Little Brassua Lake
- Brassua Lake
- Moosehead Lake
- West Branch Penobscot River
- Chesuncook Lake
- Umbazooksus Stream
- Umbazooksus Lake
- Mud Pond
- Chamberlain Lake
- Eagle Lake
- Churchill Lake
- Allagash River
- Umsaskis Lake
- Long Lake
- Round Pond
- St. John River

== Through-paddlers ==
As of 2025, 175 people have "through-paddled" the trail — traveling the length of the trail in one expedition. In addition, ten other "section-paddlers" have completed it in multiple trips.

Nicole Grohoski and Thomas Perkins of Ellsworth, Maine were the first to officially through-paddle the trail in 2006, traveling the length of the trail in about 45 days. Donnie Mullen paddled the trail in 2000 before its official opening, taking about 55 days but doing so without the signs and maps that were available in 2015. One of the fastest thru-paddles was completed in 2012 by Elspeth Ronnander, Erik Peih and Emily Johnson. The trip took them 21 days, 3 hours and 45 minutes. More recently, finishing on June 17, 2024, Jake Sexton and Monty Fuss from Ohio completed an unsupported, self-propelled, end to end thru-paddle in just 17 days, 15 hours and 41 minutes.

== Northern Forest Canoe Trail literature ==
"Paddling the Northern Forest Canoe Trail" by Sam Brakeley - a narrative of a 2009 thru-paddle in journal form.

"The Northern Forest Canoe Trail Through-Paddler's Companion" by Katina Daanen, a guide book to paddling the 740-mile (1,190 km) water trail from its western terminus in Old Forge, New York to the eastern terminus in Fort Kent, Maine.

"Paddling Through Time - The Story of the Northern Forest Canoe Trail", Northern Forest Canoe Trail, 2006. ISBN 9780978669706, 64 pages.
