= Stony Creek Ponds =

Pond on an historic canoe route in the Adirondacks

Coordinates: 44°13′20″N 74°18′18″W

Detail of the 1985 USGS Tupper Lake quadrant showing Coreys

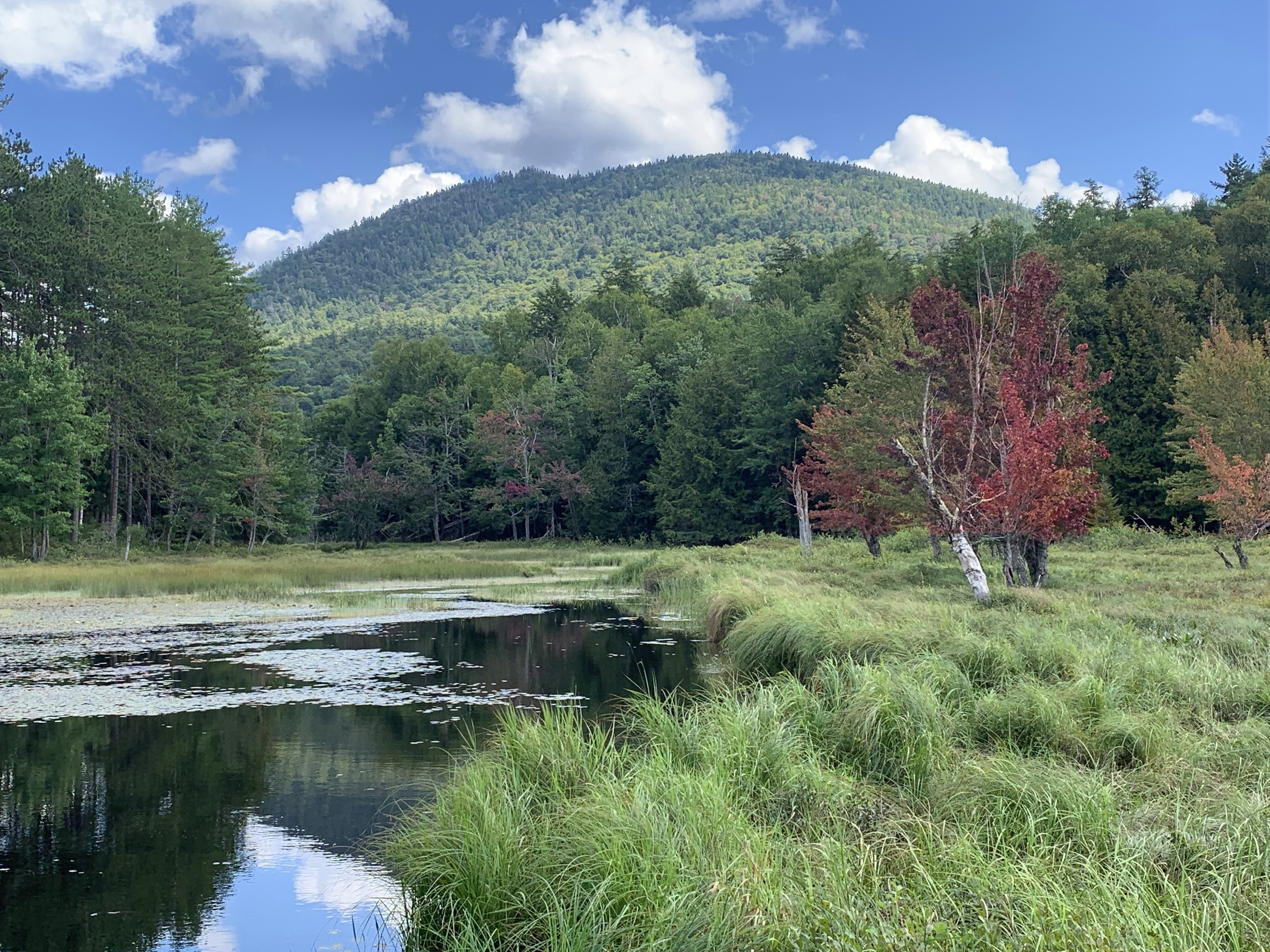
Looking east from one of the easternmost of the Stony Creek Ponds at Stony Creek Mountain

The Stony Creek Ponds are a set of three ponds totaling 190 acres near Coreys, New York. They are the source of Stony Creek, a roughly three-mile river that feeds the Raquette River.

The ponds are located at the south end of the Indian Carry, a historic portage from the south end of Upper Saranac Lake to points south. The ponds are on the route of the Northern Forest Canoe Trail, and were on the original route of the Adirondack Canoe Classic. The northernmost pond was the site of the Hiawatha House, a popular tourist hotel from the 1880s to 1918.
