= Martha Reben =

American writer

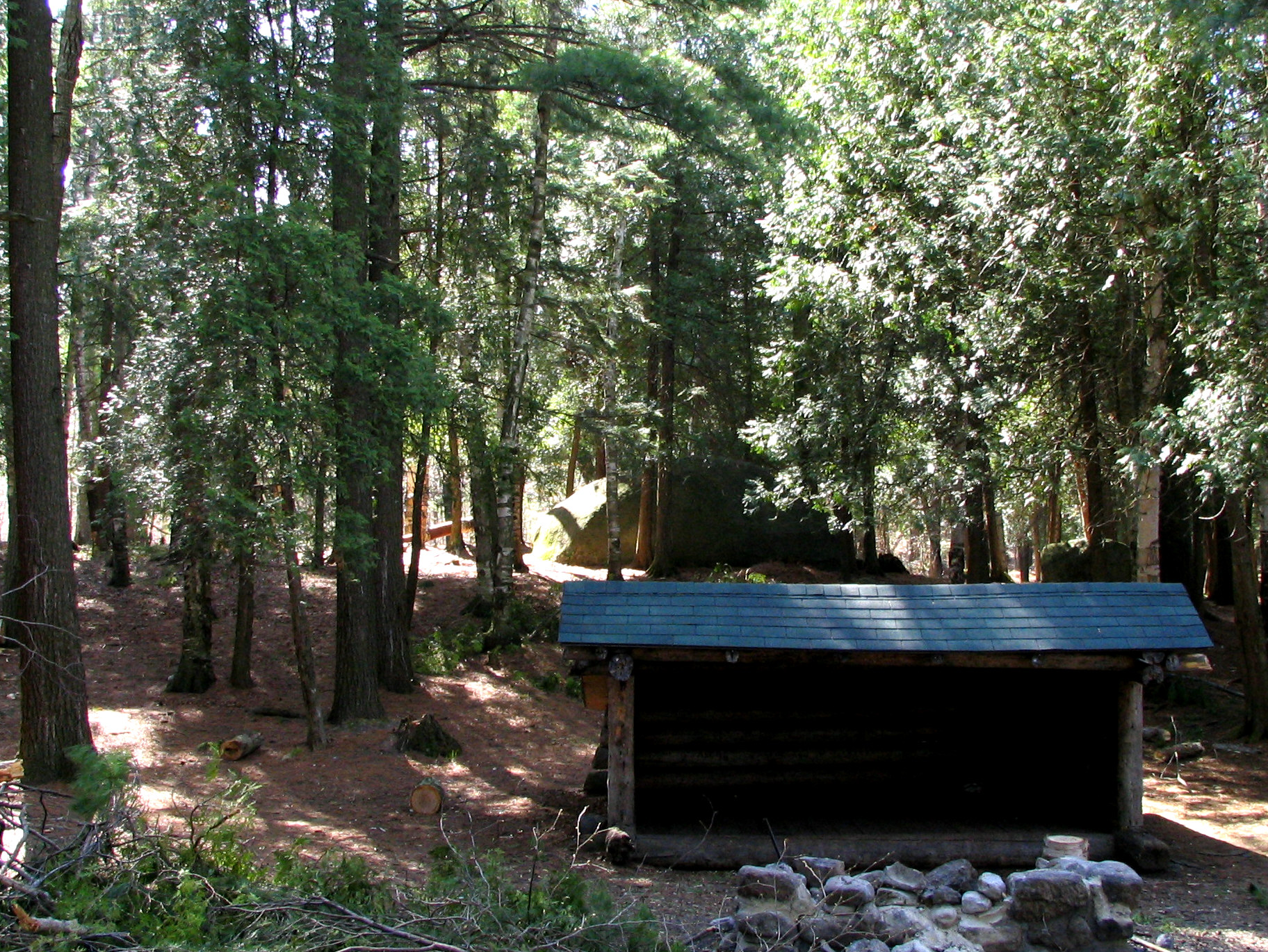
A lean-to on Weller Pond at the campsite where Martha Reben spent six summers with guide Fred Rice.

Martha Reben (born Rebentisch, 1906-1964) was an author who wrote The Healing Woods (1952), The Way of the Wilderness (1954), and A Sharing of Joy (1963) as memoirs of her experiences camping on the shore of Weller Pond eight miles from Saranac Lake, New York, in the Adirondacks in 1931 in an attempt to cure herself of tuberculosis.

Reben grew up in New York City; when she was six her mother died of tuberculosis. When she, too, became ill she was sent to cure in Pennsylvania, the Catskills and finally, in 1927, to Saranac Lake, New York, where Dr. Edward Livingston Trudeau was having considerable success treating the disease. However, after three operations failed to cure her, she decided to follow her own desires, and hired a guide to take her camping in the wilderness. She spent six years living from the spring through the fall in a tent on Weller Pond, and with her guide, Fred Rice, during the winter. She later moved to a small cottage in Saranac Lake. Her disease slowly improved, and she lived to age 58, cured of tuberculosis. Her memoirs, written from her detailed daily journals, gained a considerable following.
