= Coreys, New York =

Unincorporated hamlet in New York, US

Detail of the 1985 USGS Tupper Lake quadrant showing Coreys

Coreys is a small unincorporated hamlet in Franklin County, New York, in the US, near Stony Creek Ponds, south of Upper Saranac Lake. It is 9 miles east of Tupper Lake, and 13 miles southwest of Saranac Lake in the Adirondack Park. Its most famous resident was Clarence Petty. There was an Abenaki encampment in the area for many years, and indigenous artifacts have been found there.
