= Middle Saranac Lake =

Lake in Franklin County, New York, United States

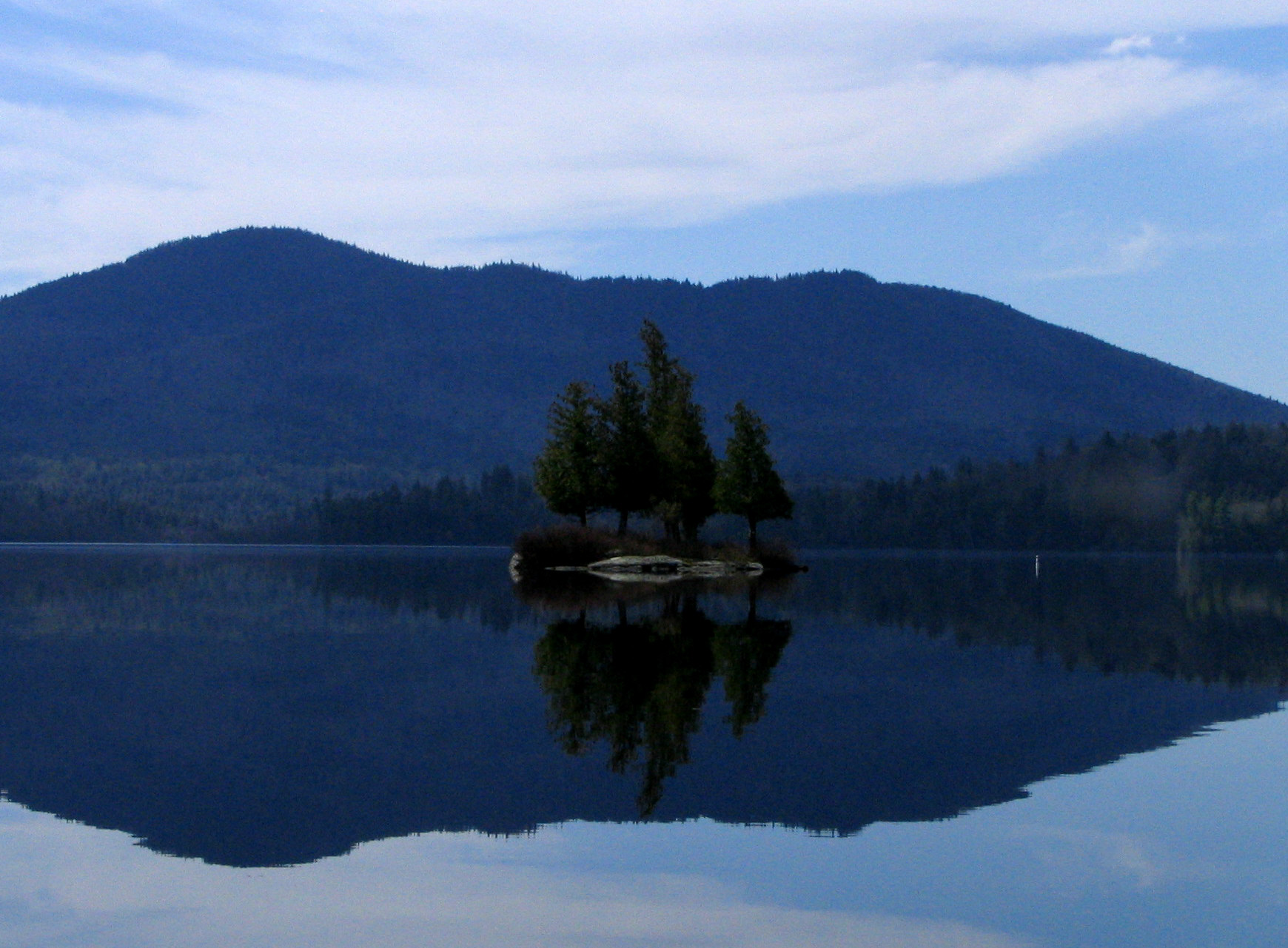
- A small island, Stony Creek Mountain in the background

- Location within New York Location within the United States
- Location: Adirondacks, Franklin County, New York
- Coordinates: 44°15′28.08″N 074°15′56.52″W
- Primary inflows: Saranac River
- Primary outflows: Saranac River
- Basin countries: United States
- Max. length: 3.2 mi (5.1 km)
- Max. width: 1 mi (1.6 km)
- Surface area: 1,414 acres (5.72 km^{2})
- Surface elevation: 1,536 ft (468 m)
- Islands: 18
- Settlements: none

Middle Saranac Lake, also called Round Lake, is the smallest of three connected lakes, part of the Saranac River, near the village of Saranac Lake in the Adirondacks in northern New York. Two-thirds of its shoreline is state-owned. The lake is located in the towns of Harrietstown and Santa Clara, in Franklin County.

With Upper Saranac Lake and Lower Saranac Lake, a 17 miles (27 km) paddle with only one portage is possible. Weller Pond, made famous by Martha Reben's The Healing Woods, can be reached via an outlet of Hungry Bay on the north shore. The Saranac Lake Islands Public Campground provides 87 campsites on Middle and Lower Saranac Lake. The lake, along with both Upper and Lower Saranac Lakes, is also part of the 740-mile Northern Forest Canoe Trail, which begins in Old Forge, NY and ends in Fort Kent, ME.

== History ==
Prior to the development of railroads and the automobile, the Saranac Lakes formed part of an important transportation route in the Adirondacks; one could travel 140 miles across, from Old Forge to Lake Champlain, almost entirely on water.

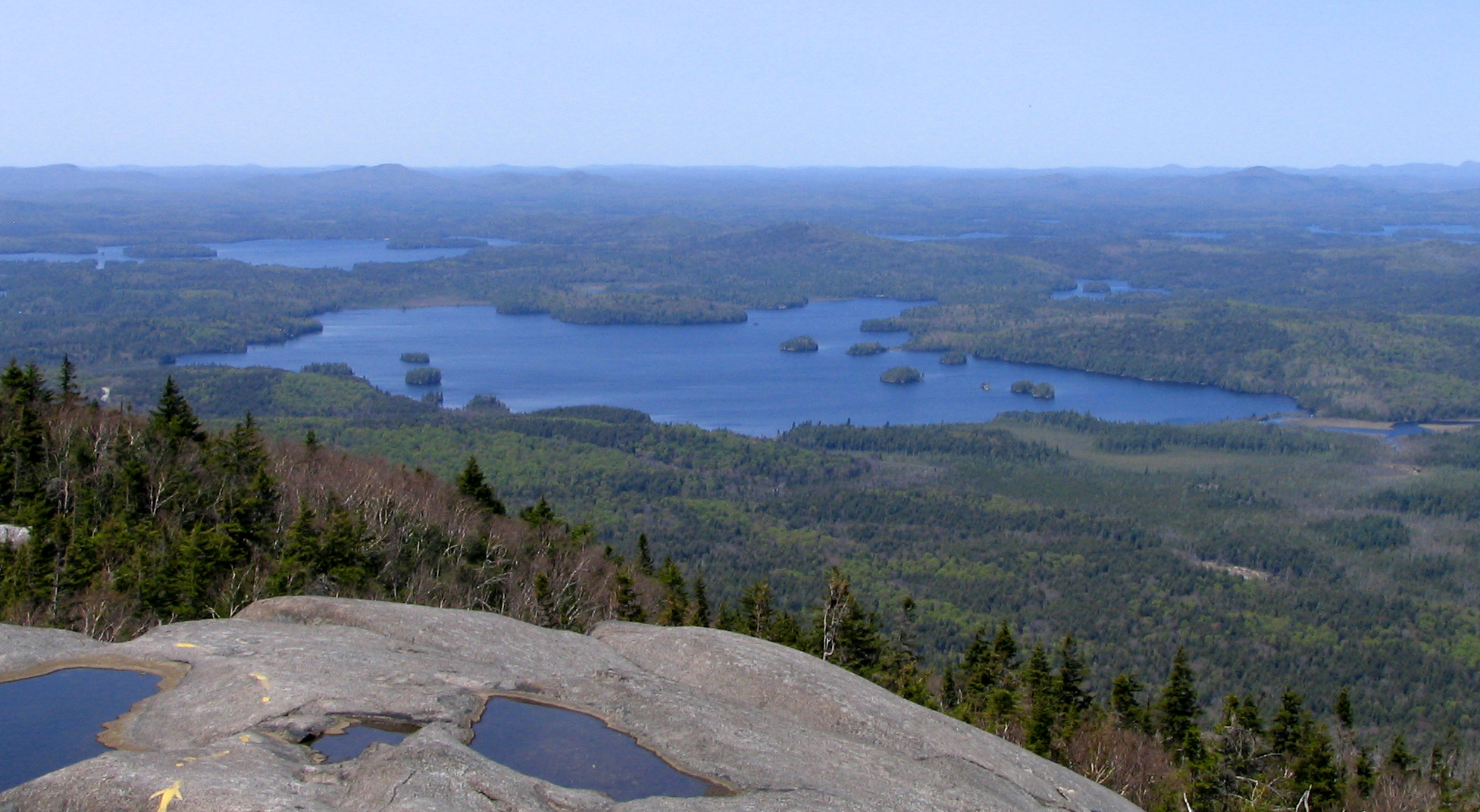
Middle Saranac Lake from Ampersand Mountain, Upper Saranac Lake, upper right, Weller Pond, center right

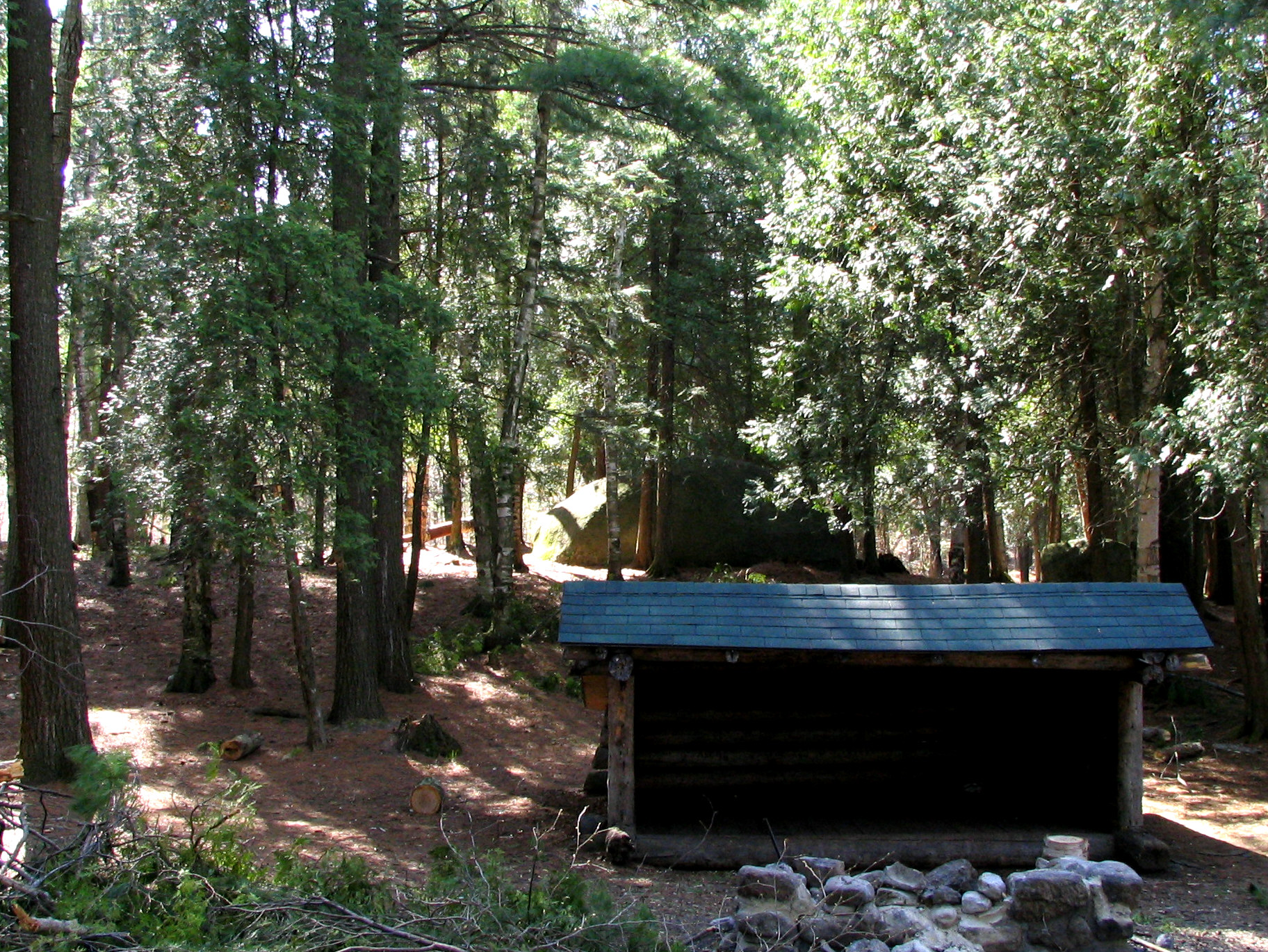
A lean-to at a campsite on Hungry Bay on Middle Saranac Lake.

== See also ==
- Adirondacks
- Upper Saranac Lake
- Lower Saranac Lake
- Northern Forest Canoe Trail

== Sources ==
Jamieson, Paul and Morris, Donald, Adirondack Canoe Waters, North Flow, Lake George, NY: Adirondack Mountain Club, 1987. ISBN 0-935272-43-7.
