= Saranac River =

Saranac River Riviere Serindac
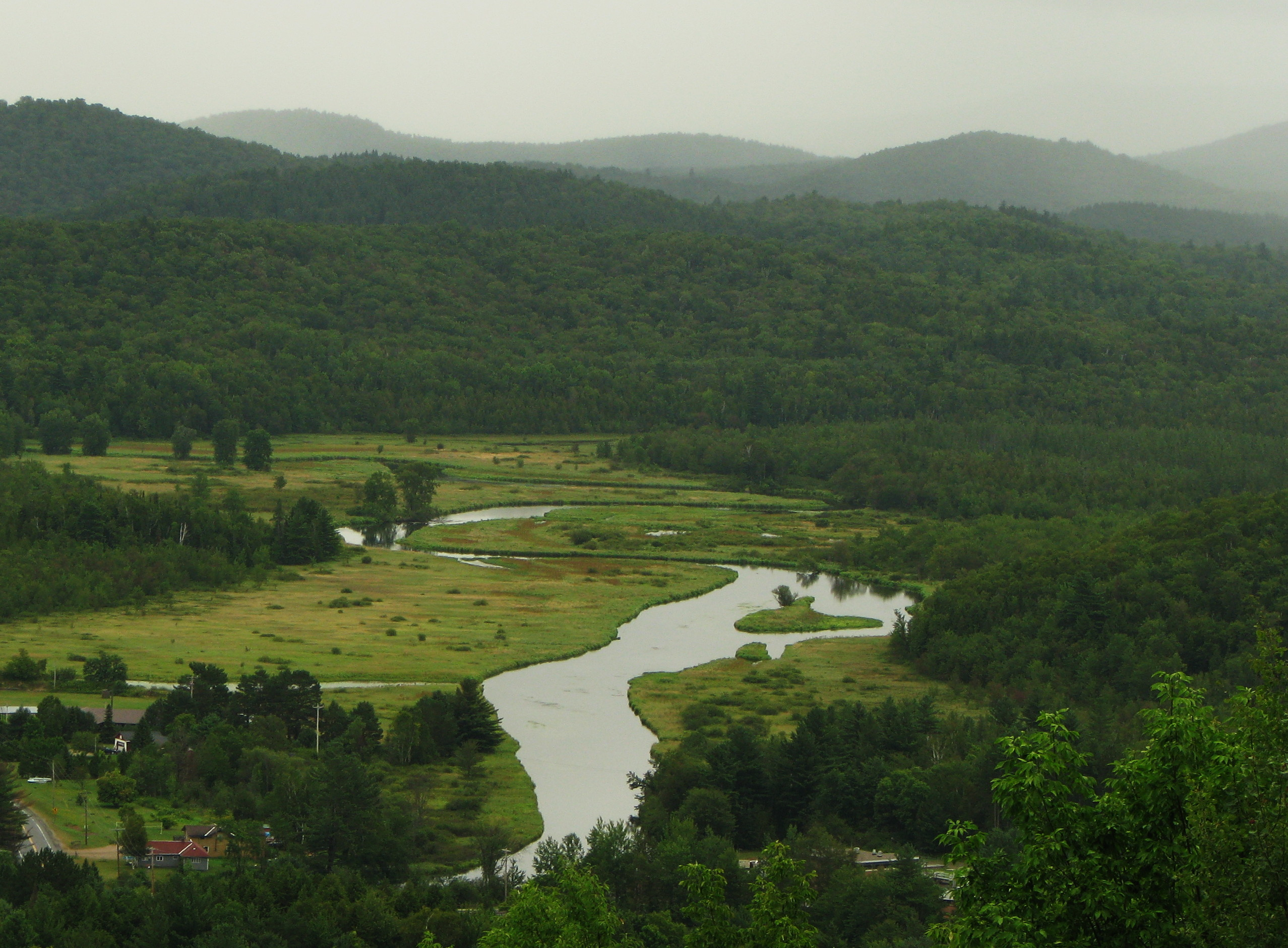
- The Saranac River flowing northeast from Saranac Lake, New York

- Location of the mouth of the Saranac River Saranac River (the United States)
- Etymology: from Abenaki, "staghorn sumac cone river."
- Native name: Tsi ietsénhtha (Mohawk); zalônák:tégw (Abenaki)

Location
- Country: United States
- State: New York
- Region: Adirondack Mountains
- Counties: Clinton, Essex, Franklin

Physical characteristics
- Source: Upper Saranac Lake
  - location: East of Wawbeek
  - coordinates: 44°15′53″N 74°14′36″W
  - elevation: 1,572 ft (479 m)
- Mouth: Lake Champlain
  - location: City of Plattsburgh
  - coordinates: 44°41′59″N 73°26′45″W
  - elevation: 95 ft (29 m)

Basin features
- Tributaries
  - left: North Branch Saranac River

The Saranac River is an 81-mile-long (130 km) river in the U.S. state of New York.

== Geography ==
In its upper reaches is a region of mostly flat water and lakes. The river has more than three dozen source lakes and ponds north of Upper Saranac Lake; the highest is Mountain Pond on Long Pond Mountain. In the last third of its length it drops two-thirds of its total drop, and is known for having navigable rapids, which make it a popular site for whitewater kayaking and canoeing.

The Saranac River empties into Lake Champlain at the City of Plattsburgh in Clinton County, New York. The river flows in a northeasterly direction from the Adirondack Mountains.

The river encompasses Upper, Middle and Lower Saranac Lakes, as well as Oseetah Lake, Lake Flower, Franklin Falls Pond and Union Falls Pond, and flows through the village of Saranac Lake; there are locks between Middle and Lower Saranac Lakes and between Lower Saranac and Oseetah, although the drop is only a few feet. Thirty-three miles further northeast, the river flows through the Town of Saranac, before winding through Plattsburgh, reaching Lake Champlain after a further 23 miles.

== Origin of name ==
The name of the river is from the Abenaki word zalônák:tégw, composed of the free noun root zalôn, meaning "staghorn sumac cone"; -ak, the Abenaki plural suffix for nouns of the animate noun class; and the bound noun root (i.e., suffix) -tégw, meaning "river." Other names for the river are Riviere Saint Amant, Riviere Saint Arnont, Riviere Salasanac, Sal-a-sa-nac and Salasance.

== Fishery ==
The Saranac River has a fairly diverse fishery, including northern pike, largemouth bass, smallmouth bass, rock bass, pumpkinseed, fallfish, brown bullhead, brown trout, and landlocked atlantic salmon.

== Tourist attractions ==
The river is also part of the 740-mile Northern Forest Canoe Trail, which begins in Old Forge, NY and ends in Fort Kent, ME.

== See also ==
- List of New York rivers
- Adirondack Mountains

== Gallery ==
Scenes from the Saranac River
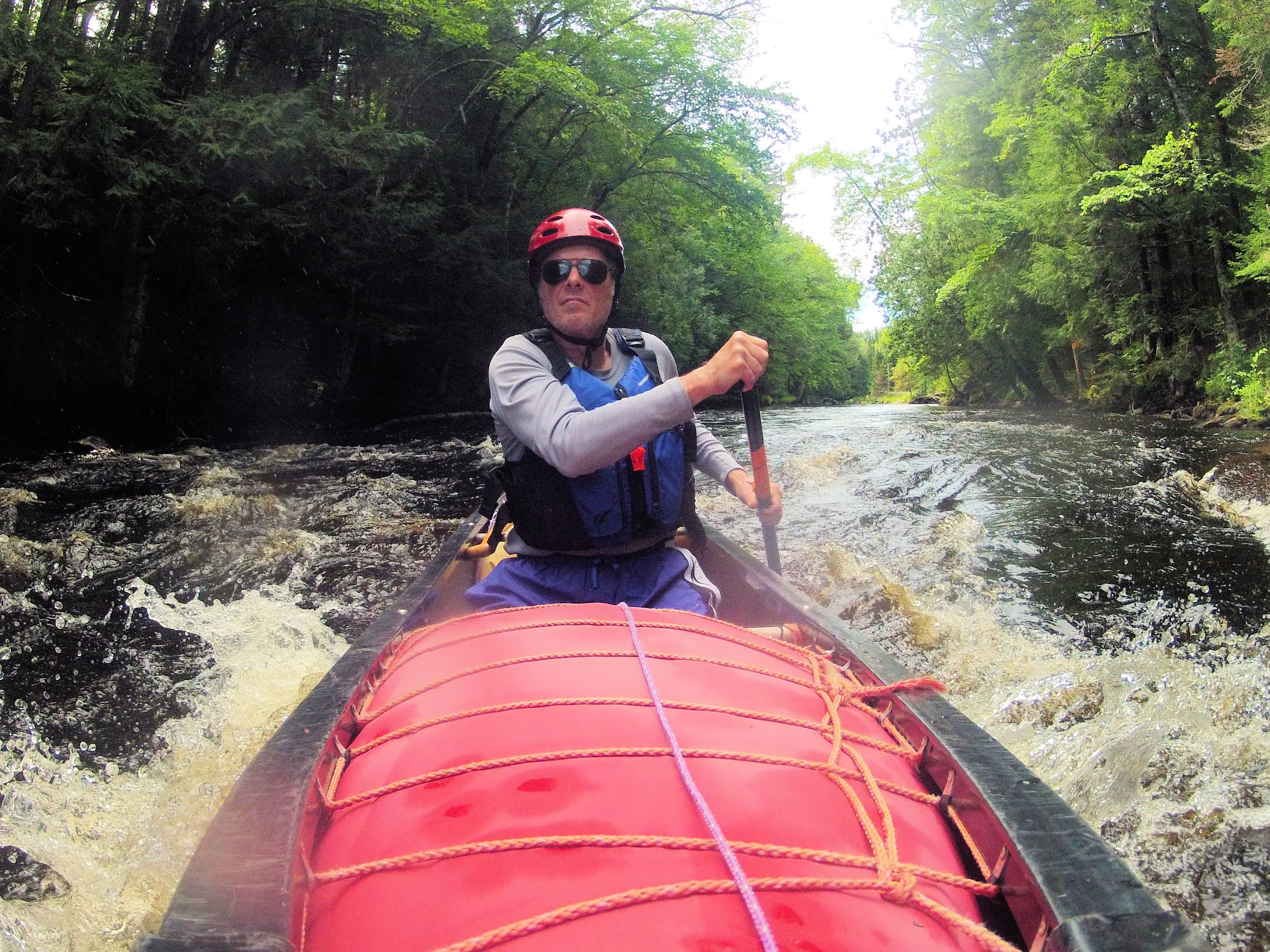
Permanent Rapids on the Saranac River, Adirondack Mountains, New York State, USA

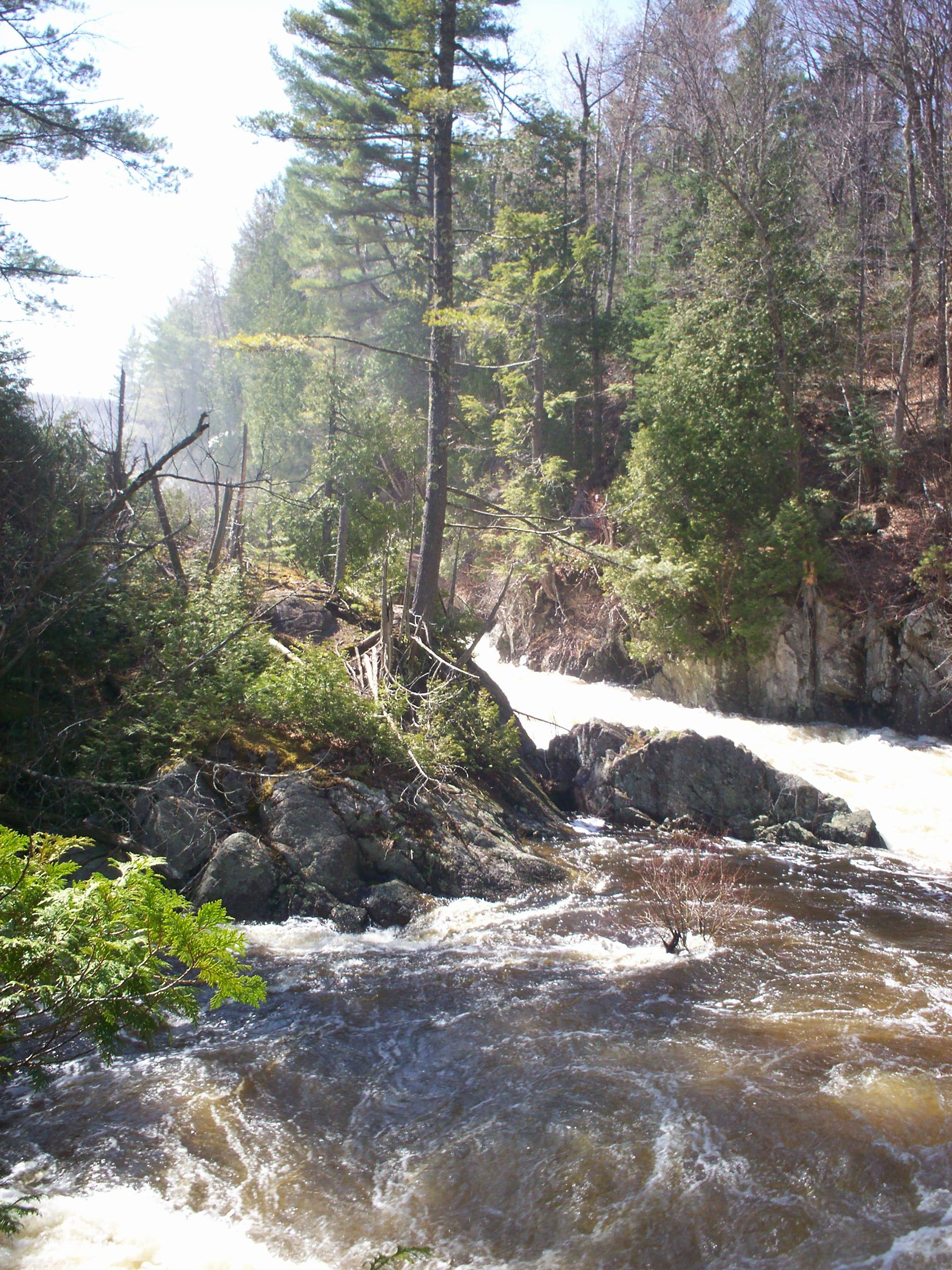
Franklin Falls in the Spring

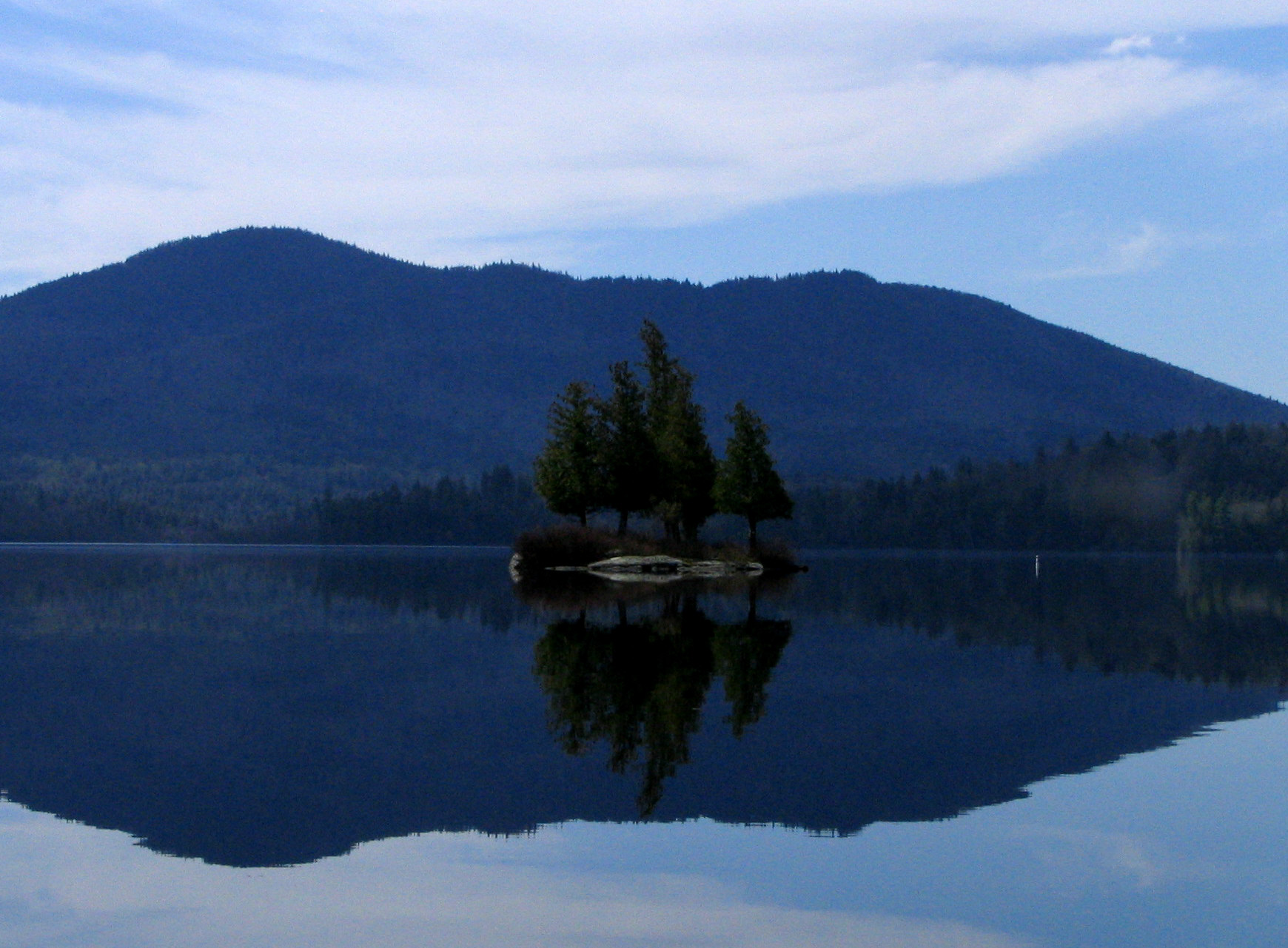
A small island in Middle Saranac Lake, Stony Creek Mountain behind

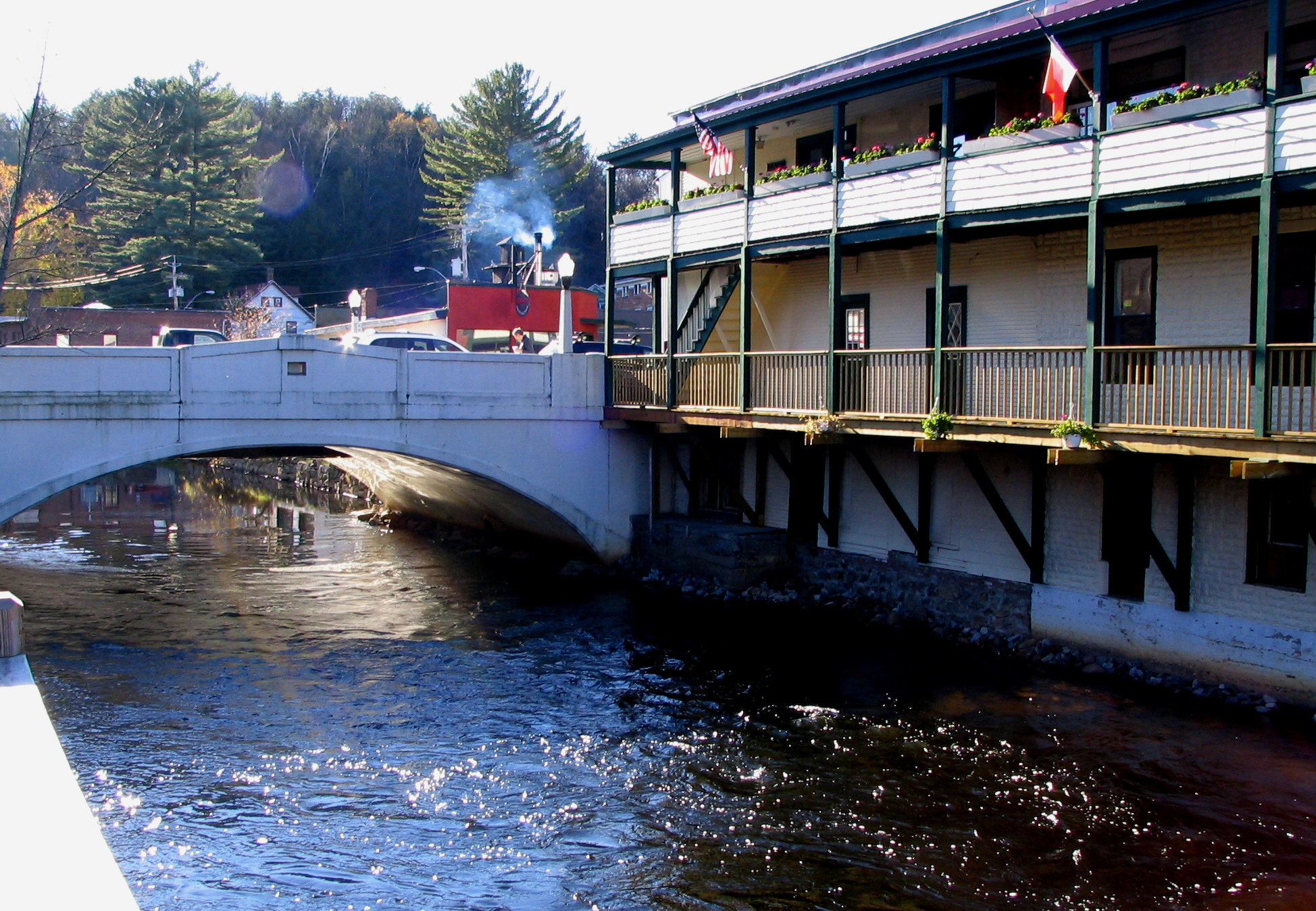
The river passes through Saranac Lake

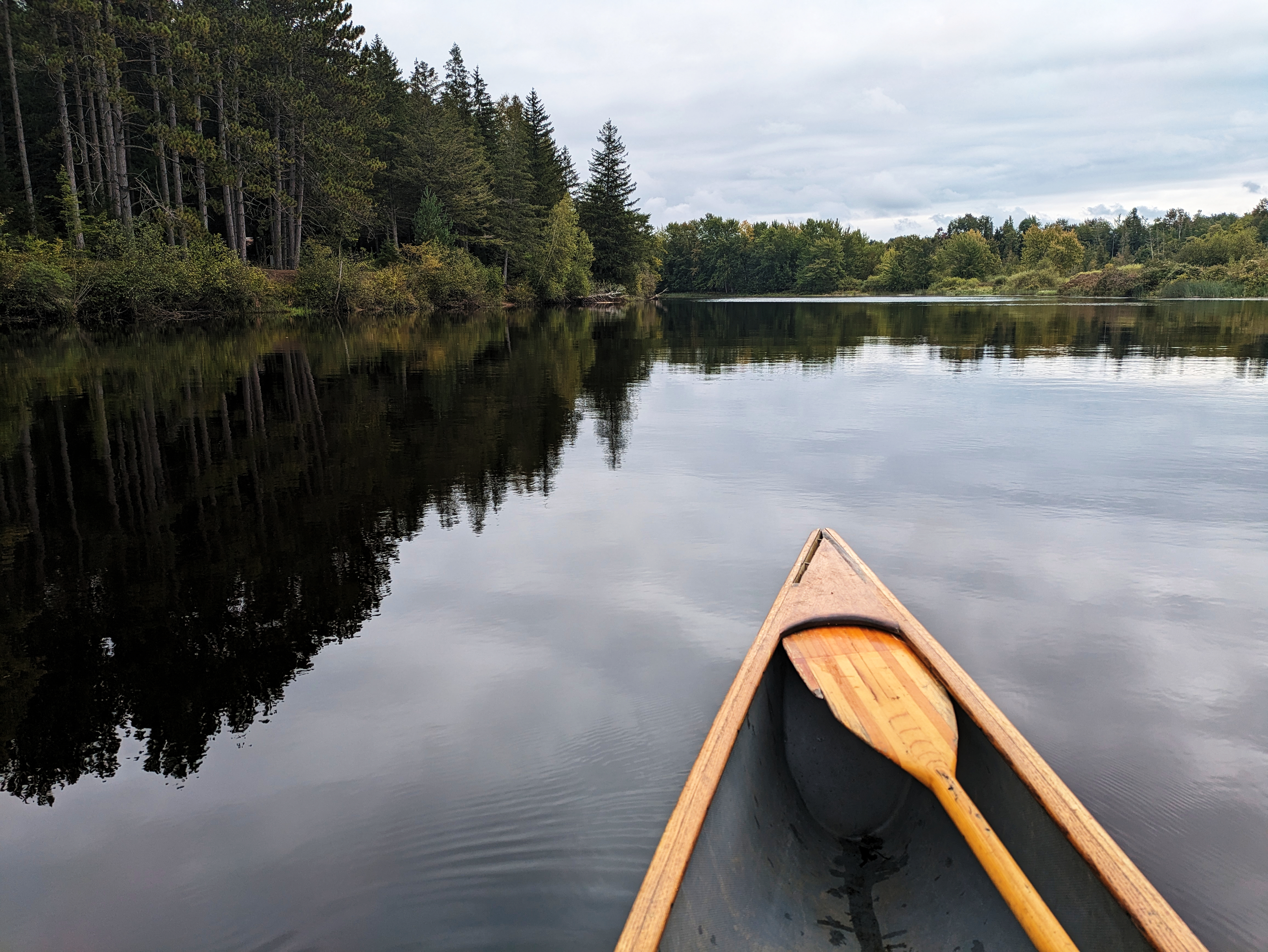
The Saranac River in Clinton County, NY

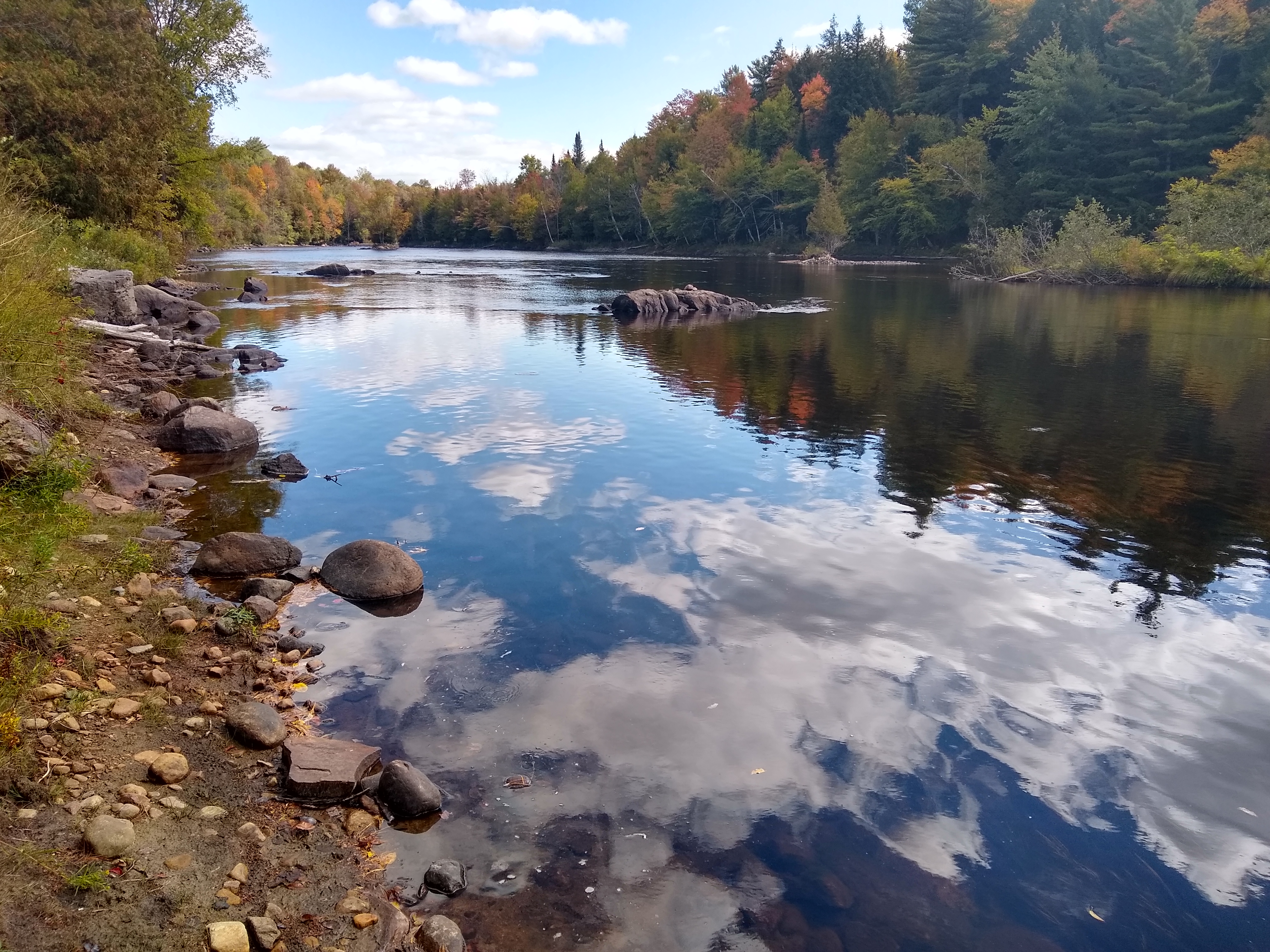
Saranac River near Redford, NY
