= Lower Saranac Lake =

Lake in Franklin County, New York, United States

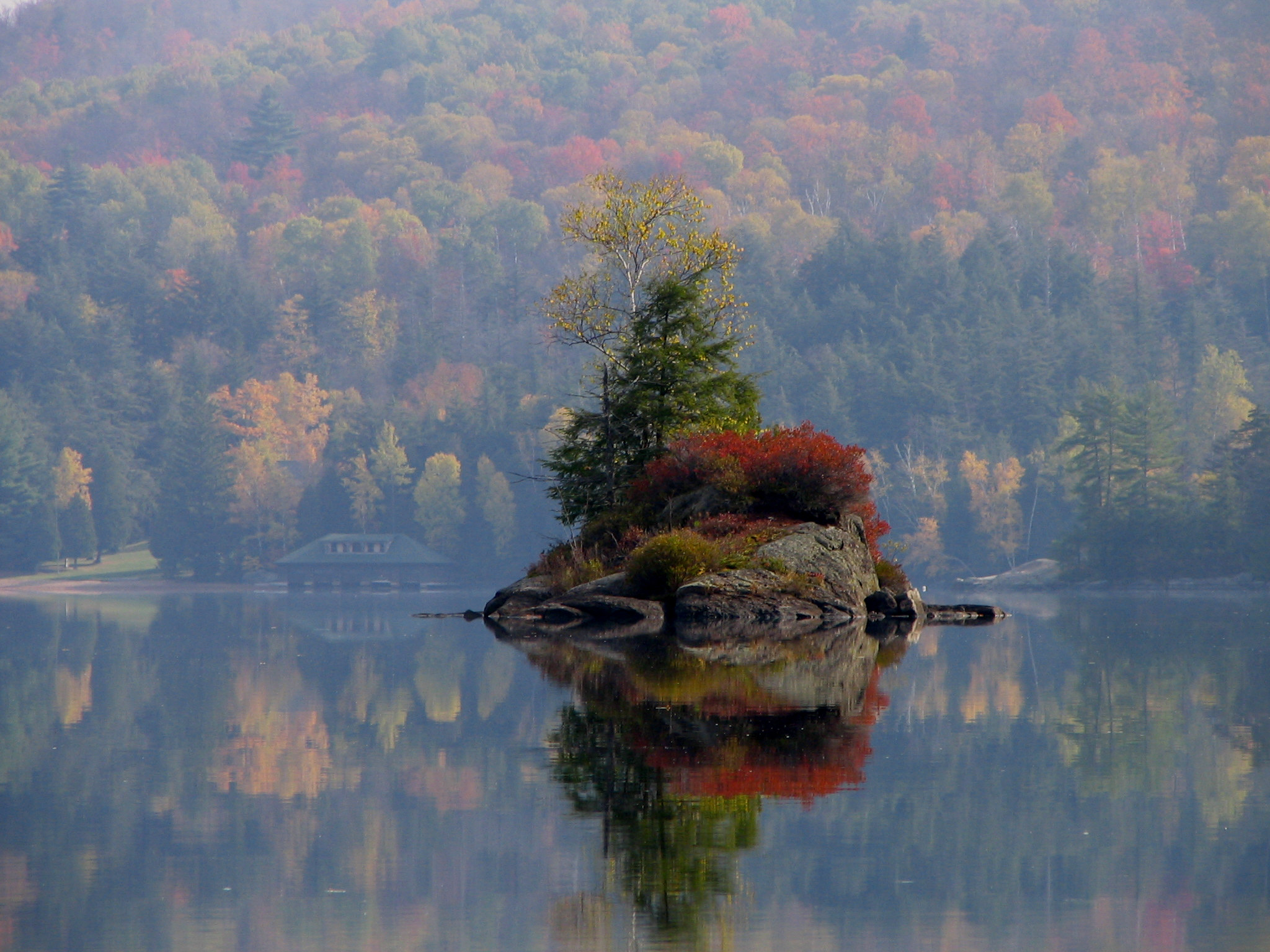
- A Small Island in Lower Saranac Lake

- Location within New York
- Location: Adirondacks, Franklin County, New York
- Coordinates: 44°18′29.02″N 074°11′3.01″W
- Primary inflows: Saranac River
- Primary outflows: Saranac River
- Basin countries: United States
- Max. length: 6 mi (9.7 km)
- Max. width: 2 mi (3.2 km)
- Surface area: 2,285 acres (9.25 km^{2})
- Shore length^{1}: 17 mi (27 km)
- Surface elevation: 1,535 ft (468 m)
- Islands: 50
- Settlements: none
- ^{1} Shore length is not a well-defined measure.

Lower Saranac Lake is one of three connected lakes, part of the Saranac River, near the village of Saranac Lake in the Adirondacks in northern New York. With Middle Saranac Lake and Upper Saranac Lake, a 17-mile (27 km) paddle with only one portage is possible. The Saranac Lake Islands Public Campground provides 87 campsites on inlands in Lower and Middle Saranac Lake. In addition to the Saranac River, it is fed by nearby Lake Colby, Fish Creek, and Lilly Pad Pond. Lower Saranac Lake is located in the town of Harrietstown, New York. The lake, along with both Upper and Middle Saranac Lakes, is also part of the 740-mile Northern Forest Canoe Trail, which begins in Old Forge, NY and ends in Fort Kent, ME.

== History ==
Prior to the development of railroads and the automobile, the Saranac Lakes formed part of an important transportation route in the Adirondacks; one could travel 140 miles (230 km) across, from Old Forge to Lake Champlain, almost entirely on water. In 1849, William F. Martin built one of the first hotels in the Adirondacks— the "Saranac Lake House", known simply as "Martin's"— on the northeast shore of Lower Saranac Lake. Martin's, with room for 80 guests, became a favorite place for hunters, woodsmen, and socialites to meet and interact; a young Theodore Roosevelt was among the guests, and the members of the famous "Philosopher's Camp" on Follensby Pond (including poets Ralph Waldo Emerson and James Russell Lowell and scientist Louis Agassiz) found their guides at Martins. The publication of William H. H. Murray's Adventures in the Wilderness; Or Camp-Life in the Adirondacks in 1869, containing a favorable review of Martin's, started a flood of tourists to the area, leading to a rash of hotel building and the development of stage coach lines. In 1892, Dr. William Seward Webb's Mohawk and Malone Railway reached the village of Saranac Lake; it dramatically reduced travel time from major east coast cities to the Adirondacks, and had a major impact on the hotel and the area. In 1870, the hotel's capacity was doubled. In 1880, Martin lost the hotel through foreclosure. The new owner promptly remodeled and increased capacity to 250 guests. In 1888, it underwent its final renovations, but in 1894, it burned to the ground.

In 1884, a new hotel was built half a mile southeast of Martins. Known originally as Alexander's or the Alexander House, with a capacity for one hundred guests, in 1890, it changed hands and was renamed The Algonquin. It quickly established a reputation for luxury, modern technology, and fine cuisine, and the capacity was soon raised to 150. In 1914, the hotel was leased to a firm that tried using it as a tuberculosis sanatorium, an innovation that failed the first year. Although it resumed operation as a hotel, it never did well again, changing hands several times, ultimately becoming the property of Edmond Guggenheim, who owned property nearby; he donated it to the Trudeau Institute, which replaced the structure with their present building in the late 1950s.

In 1888, a third hotel was built at the northern end of the lake, this on the western shore of Ampersand bay, the Hotel Ampersand. Originally conceived as a year-round health resort, banking on Saranac Lake's reputation for the treatment of tuberculosis, instead it found its best clientele to be healthy summer vacationers. The largest and most fashionable of the three hotels, it was dubbed the Saratoga of Lower Saranac Lake. It was saved from the slow decline of its neighbors by a spectacular fire in 1907. It was never rebuilt.

As the state owned much of the shoreline of Lower Saranac Lake, there is much less development there than on Upper Saranac Lake. One notable property is the Knollwood Club, built in 1899–1900 by local architect William L. Coulter for six friends, including Louis Marshall and Daniel Guggenheim. Louis Marshall's sons wilderness activist Bob Marshall and conservationist George Marshall spent the summers of their youth there, and Albert Einstein was a frequent summer visitor; he was at Knollwood on August 6, 1945, when he heard on the radio that the atom bomb had been dropped on Hiroshima. Einstein enjoyed sailing on the lake, and on occasion needed to be rescued by local residents after capsizing.

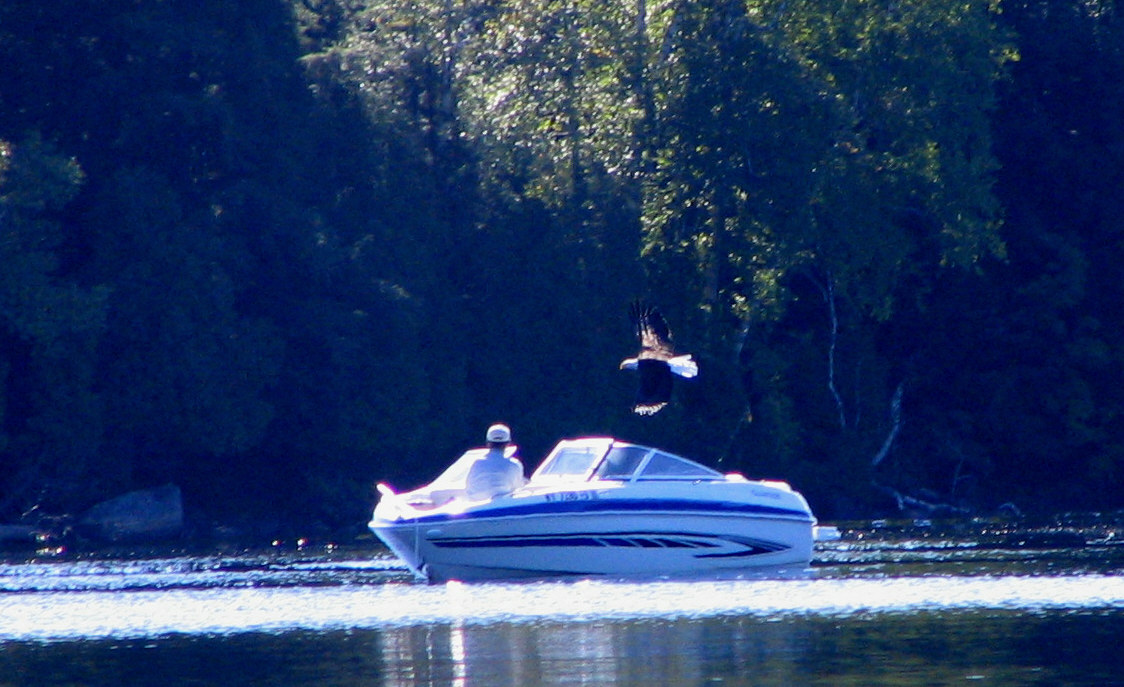
Bald eagle, Ampersand Bay

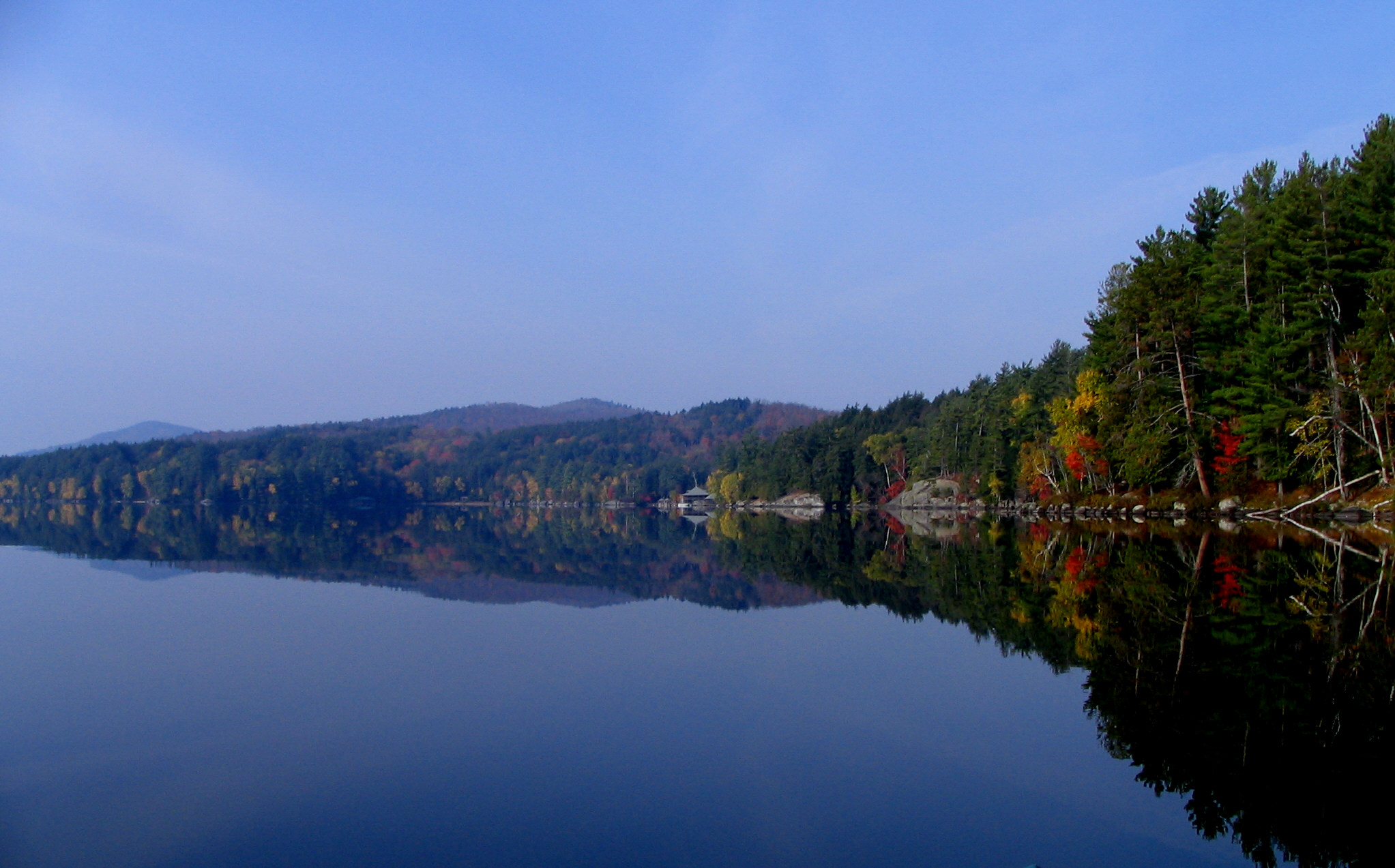
Shingle Bay

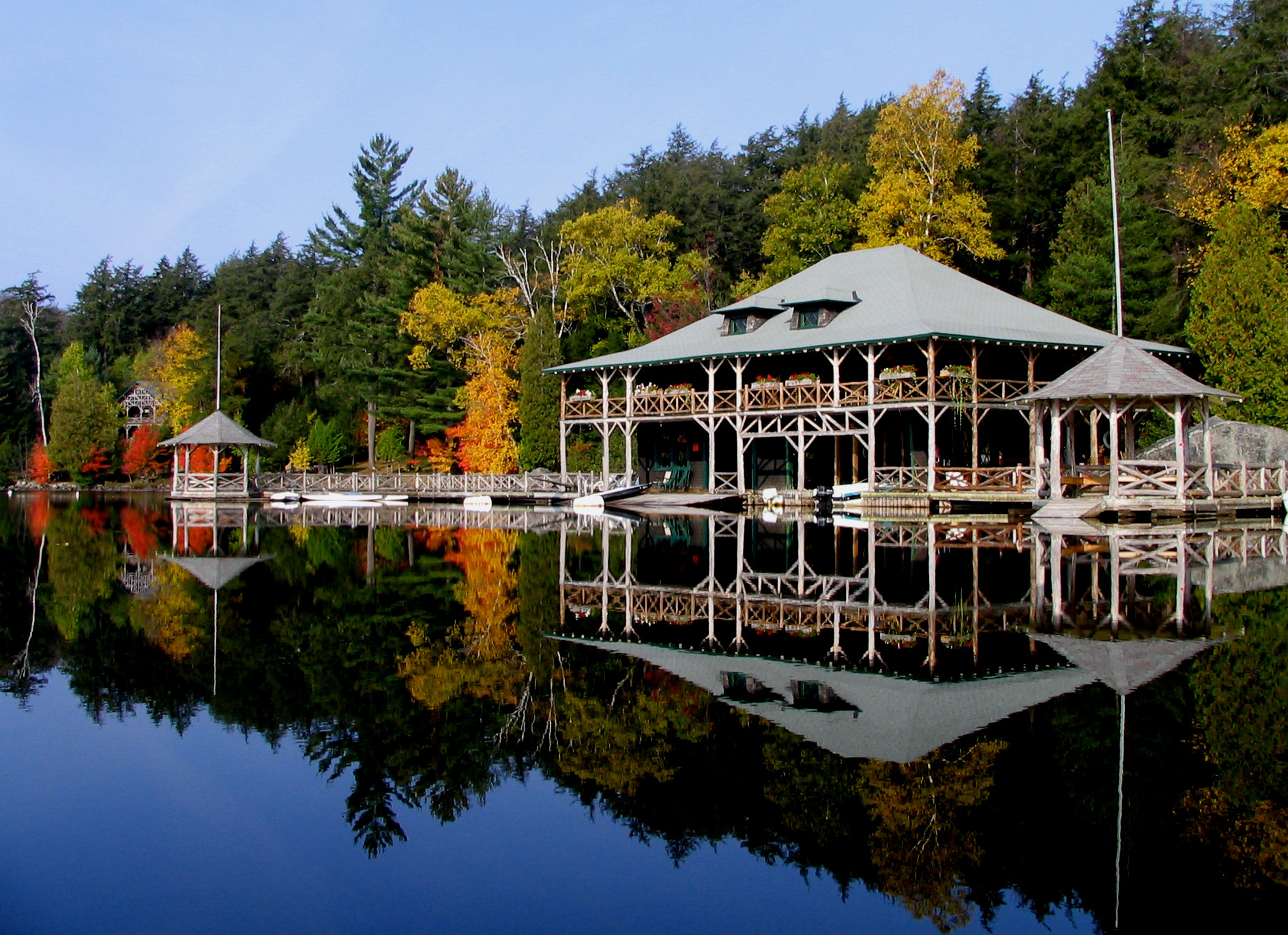
Knollwood Club Great Camp

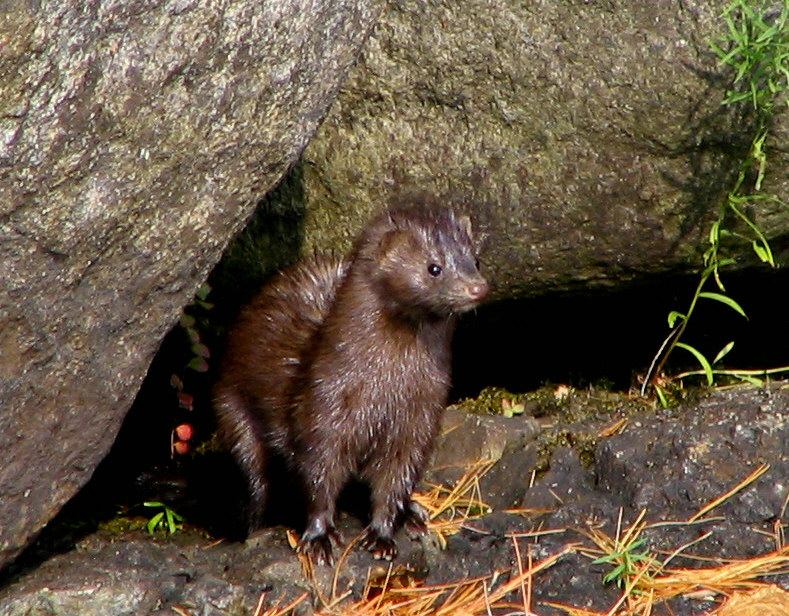
A mink, near Fish Creek

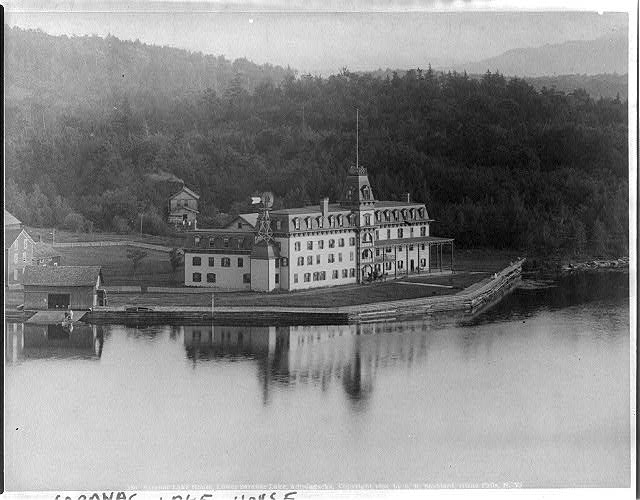
Saranac Lake House, 1890 (Stoddard)

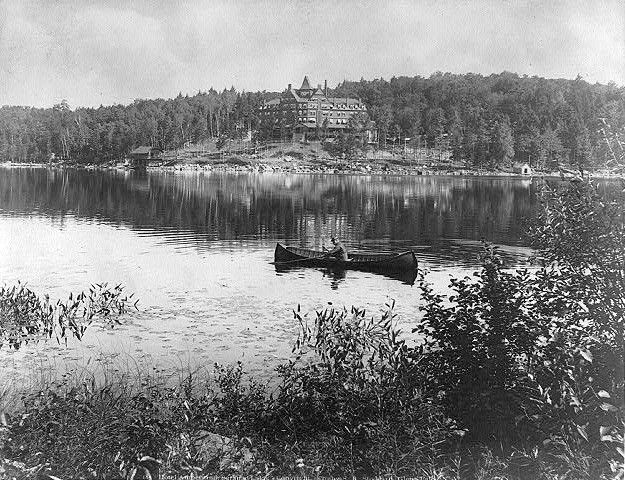
Hotel Ampersand, 1890 (Stoddard)

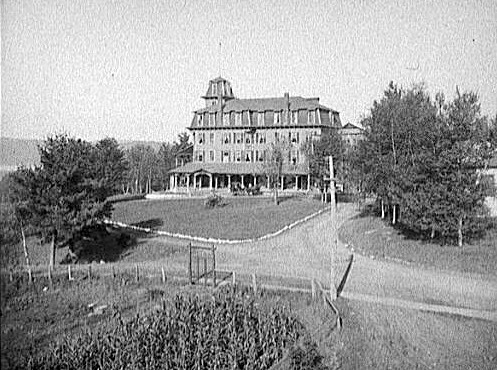
The Algonquin (c. 1900 - 1910)

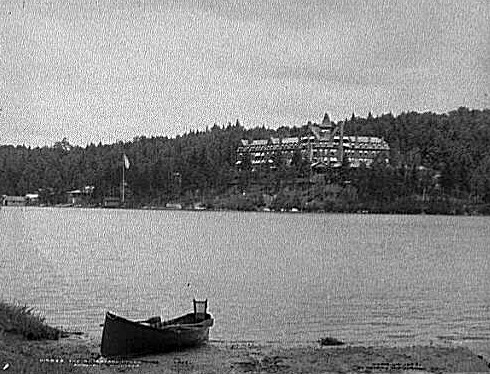
Hotel Ampersand, WH Jackson, 1902

== See also ==
- Adirondacks
- Middle Saranac Lake
- Northern Forest Canoe Trail
- Upper Saranac Lake

== Sources ==
- Jamieson, Paul and Morris, Donald, Adirondack Canoe Waters, North Flow, Lake George, NY: Adirondack Mountain Club, 1987. ISBN 0-935272-43-7.
- Tolles, Bryant F. Jr., Resort Hotels of the Adirondacks, Lebanon NH: University Press of New England, 2003. ISBN 1-58465-096-6.
