= Radwell Cottage =

Historic house in New York, United States

- U.S. National Register of Historic Places
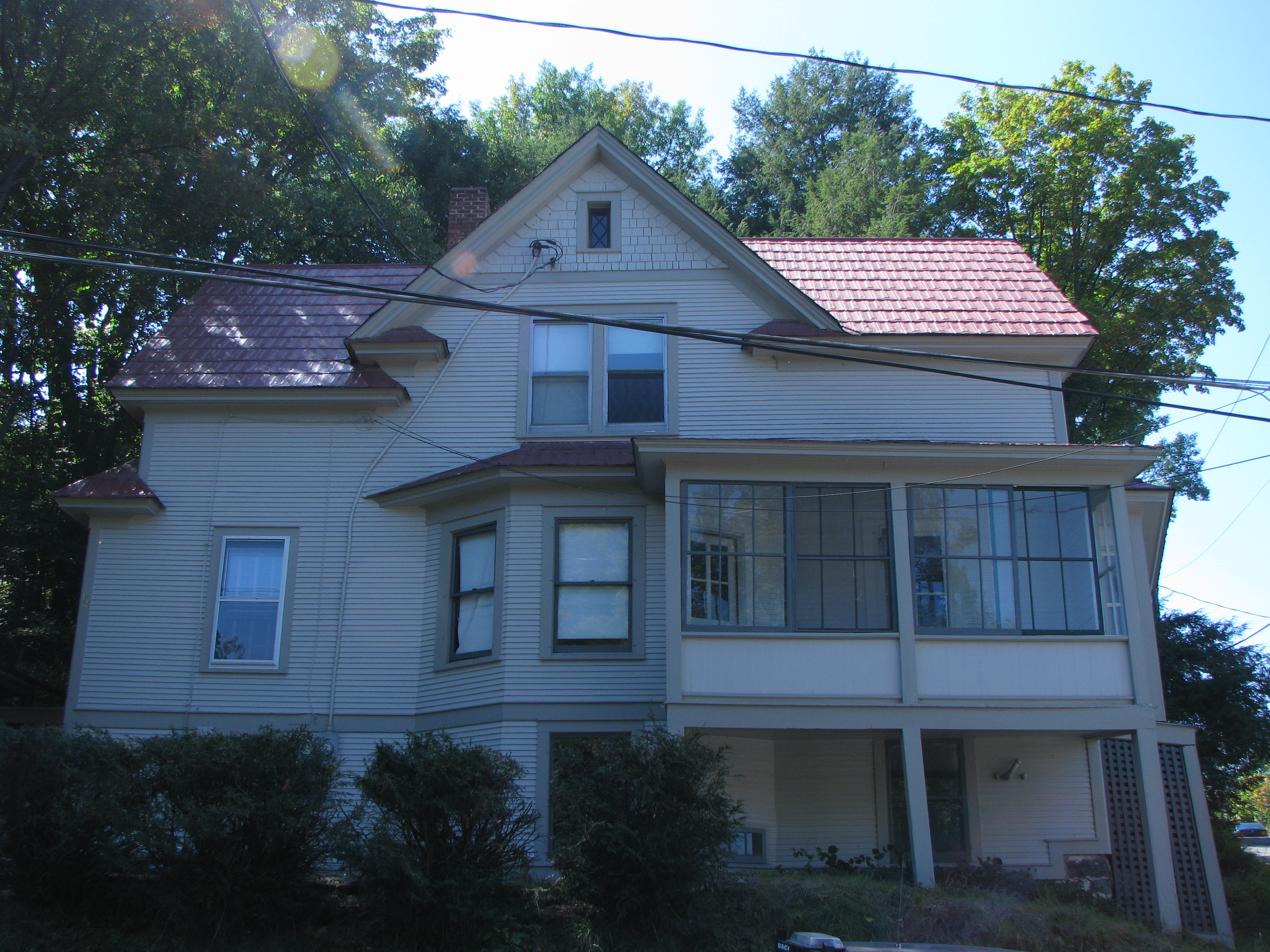
- Radwell Cottage, September 2008

- Location within New York Location within the United States
- Location: 2 Charles St., Saranac Lake, Harrietstown, New York, U.S.
- Coordinates: 44°19′50″N 74°8′17″W
- Area: less than one acre
- Built: 1896
- Architect: Callanan, Mr.
- Architectural style: Colonial Revival
- MPS: Saranac Lake MPS
- NRHP reference No.: 92001456
- Added to NRHP: November 6, 1992

Radwell Cottage is a historic cure cottage located at Saranac Lake in the town of Harrietstown, Franklin County, New York, United States. It was built about 1896 and is a 2 1/2-story, wood-frame dwelling with clapboard siding and a gable roof on a native fieldstone foundation. It features a flat-roofed cure porch in an irregular "L" shape that bends outward from the facade. A second cure porch is rectangular and supported on posts.

It was listed on the National Register of Historic Places in 1992.
