= Seeley Cottage =

Historic house in New York, United States

- U.S. National Register of Historic Places
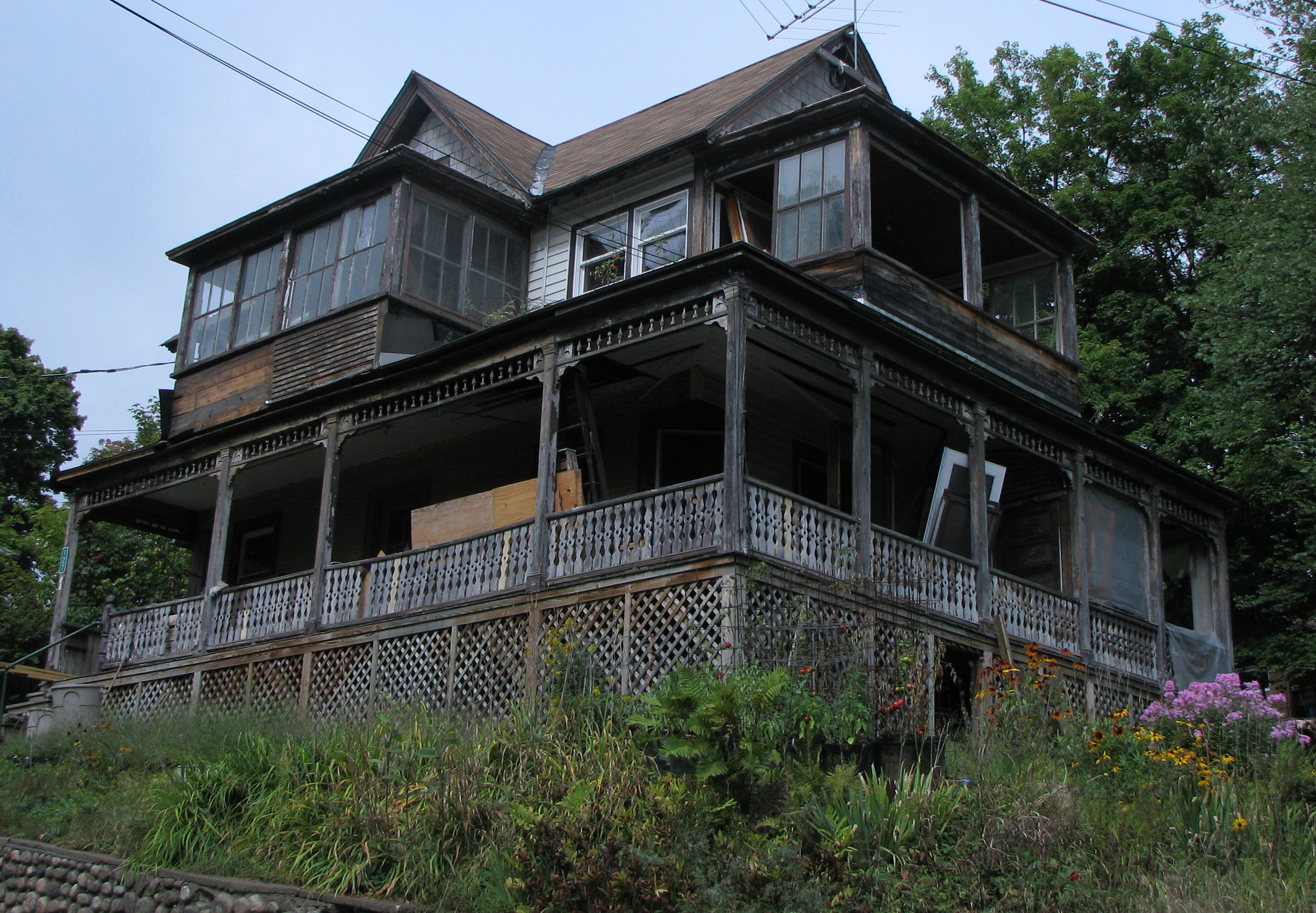
- Seeley Cottage, September 2008

- Location within New York Location within the United States
- Location: 27 Olive St., Saranac Lake, Harrietstown, New York, U.S.
- Coordinates: 44°19′41″N 74°8′6″W
- Area: less than one acre
- Built: 1890
- Architectural style: Colonial Revival, Queen Anne
- MPS: Saranac Lake MPS
- NRHP reference No.: 92001423
- Added to NRHP: November 06, 1992

Seeley Cottage is a historic cure cottage located at Saranac Lake in the town of Harrietstown, Franklin County, New York. It was built around 1890 and is a 2 1/2-story, side-gable-roofed, wood frame dwelling on a raised basement with clapboard, aluminum, and asbestos siding. There is a sizable 2-story rear wing. The cottage features a large open verandah with two sizable cure porches on top. It operated for many years as a private sanatorium.

It was listed on the National Register of Historic Places in 1992.
