= Sarbanes Cottage =

Historic house in New York, United States

- U.S. National Register of Historic Places
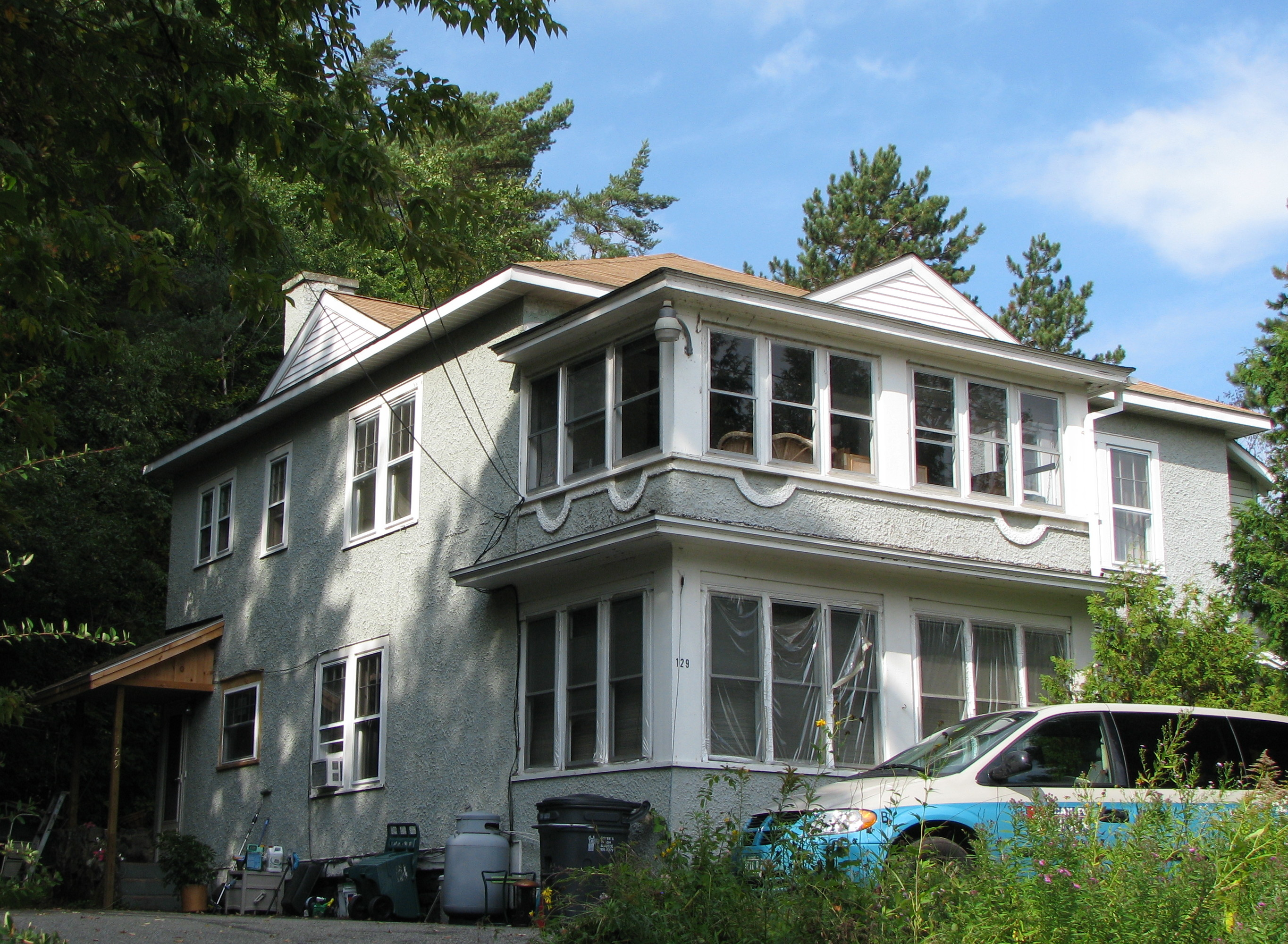
- Sarbanes Cottage, September 2008

- Location within New York Location within the United States
- Location: 72 Bloomingdale Ave., Saranac Lake, Harrietstown, New York, U.S.
- Coordinates: 44°19′51″N 74°7′40″W
- Area: less than one acre
- Built: 1930
- Architectural style: Late 19th And 20th Century Revivals, Mediterranean
- MPS: Saranac Lake MPS
- NRHP reference No.: 92001451
- Added to NRHP: November 6, 1992

Sarbanes Cottage is a historic cure cottage located at Saranac Lake in the town of Harrietstown, Franklin County, New York. It was built in about 1930 and is a two-story, wood-frame duplex dwelling with stucco siding and a hipped roof, 40 feet square on a fieldstone foundation. The basement once held the Sarbanes family's candy factory.

It was listed on the National Register of Historic Places in 1992.
