= E. L. Gray House =

Historic house in New York, United States

- U.S. National Register of Historic Places
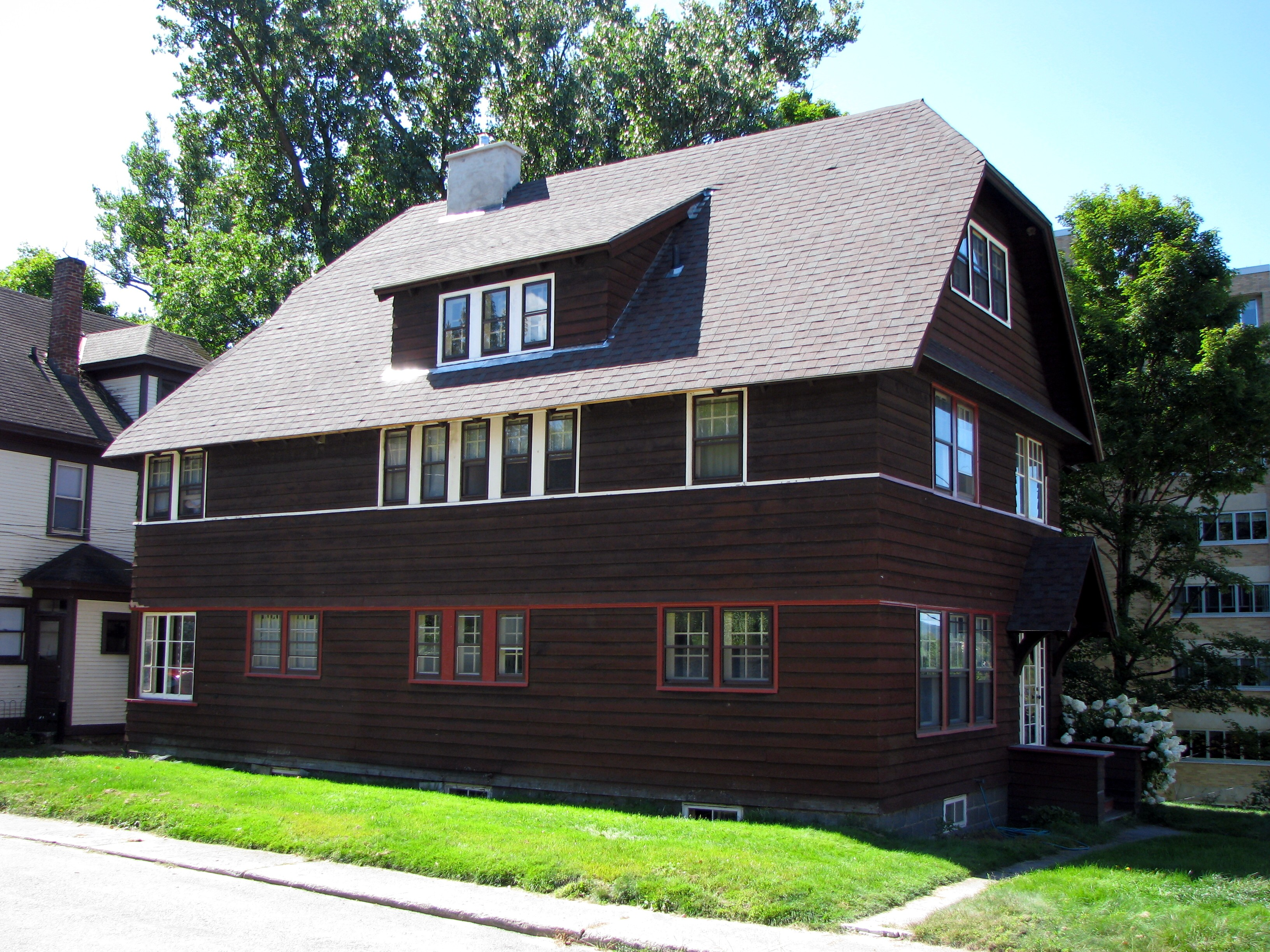
- E. L. Gray House, September 2008

- Location within New York Location within the United States
- Location: 15 Helen St., Saranac Lake, Harrietstown, New York, U.S.
- Coordinates: 44°19′34″N 74°7′41″W
- Area: less than one acre
- Built: 1911
- Architect: Scopes & Feustmann
- Architectural style: Shingle Style
- MPS: Saranac Lake MPS
- NRHP reference No.: 92001469
- Added to NRHP: November 6, 1992

E. L. Gray House is a historic cure cottage located at Saranac Lake in the town of Harrietstown, Franklin County, New York. It was built in 1911–1913 and is a 2 1/2-story, rectangular frame structure with a concrete block foundation and steeply pitched, multi-planed roof in the Shingle style.

It was listed on the National Register of Historic Places in 1992.
