= Harrietstown, New York =

- Town
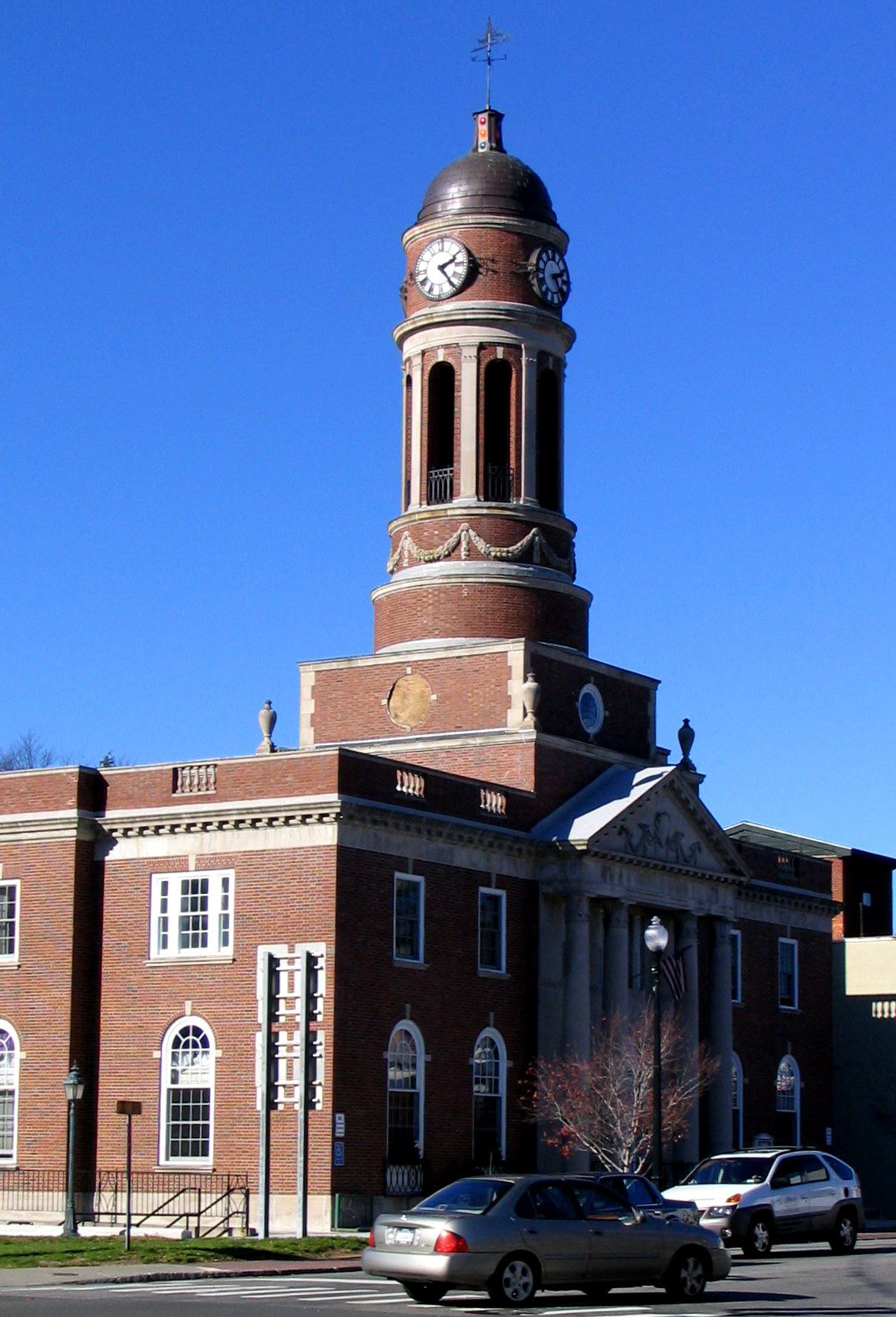
- Harrietstown Hall in Saranac Lake

- Location within the state of New York Harriets- town (the United States)
- Coordinates: 44°18′13″N 74°11′24″W
- Country: United States
- State: New York
- County: Franklin

Government
  - Type: Town Council
  - Town Supervisor: Larry L. Miller (R)
  - Town Council: Members' List: • Jordanna Mallach; • Barry DeFuria (R); • Robert T. Bevilacqua (R); • James L. Murnane, III (R)

Area
  - Total: 213.64 sq mi (553.33 km^{2})
  - Land: 196.95 sq mi (510.10 km^{2})
  - Water: 16.69 sq mi (43.23 km^{2})
- Elevation: 1,568 ft (478 m)

Population (2020)
  - Total: 5,254
  - Density: 26.68/sq mi (10.30/km^{2})
- Time zone: UTC-5 (Eastern (EST))
  - Summer (DST): UTC-4 (EDT)
- ZIP Codes: 12983 (Saranac Lake); 12945 (Lake Clear); 12986 (Tupper Lake)
- Area code: 518
- FIPS code: 36-033-32314
- GNIS feature ID: 0979050
- Website: www.harrietstown.org

Harrietstown is a town in Franklin County, New York, United States. The total population was 5,254 at the 2020 census, In 2010 3,879 of the town's residents lived in the village of Saranac Lake on the eastern side of the town.

Harrietstown is in the southeastern corner of Franklin County and is south of the town of Brighton.

== History ==
The area around Saranac Lake was first settled circa 1819. Harrietstown was formed from the town of Duane in 1841. At the end of the 19th century, it became the location for sanatoria for the treatment of lung diseases, taking advantage of the clear mountain air.

By 1900, the area became a tourist area, assisted by the winter carnivals begun in 1898.

Ames Cottage, Baird Cottage, Camp Intermission, Church Street Historic District, Colbath Cottage, Cottage Row Historic District, Distin Cottage, Drury Cottage, Ellenberger Cottage, Feisthamel-Edelberg Cottage, Feustmann Cottage, E. L. Gray House, Hillside Lodge, Hooey Cottage, Hopkins Cottage, Jennings Cottage, Johnson Cottage, Leis Block, Leis Cottage, Magill Cottage, McBean Cottage, Morgan Cottage, Noyes Cottage, Radwell Cottage, Ryan Cottage, Sarbanes Cottage, Schrader-Griswold Cottage, Seeley Cottage, Sloan Cottage, Smith Cottage, Stonaker Cottage, and Walker Cottage are listed on the National Register of Historic Places.

== Geography ==
Harrietstown is inside the Adirondack Park and is the largest town by area in Franklin County. According to the United States Census Bureau, it has a total area of 213.7 square miles (553.4 km^{2}), of which 196.9 square miles (509.9 km^{2}) is land and 16.8 square miles (43.5 km^{2}), or 7.87%, is water.

The southern town line is the border of Hamilton County and Essex County. The eastern town boundary is also on the border of Essex County. The village of Saranac Lake is on the eastern border of the town, primarily in Harrietstown but extending east into the towns of St. Armand and North Elba in Essex County.

New York State Route 3 runs east–west through the town, while New York State Route 30 and New York State Route 86 traverse the town, running north–south. NY-3 and NY-30 join in the western part of the town. New York State Route 186 connects NY-3 to NY-86 in the northern part of the town.

All of Lower Saranac Lake, most of Middle Saranac Lake, and the southern end of Upper Saranac Lake occupy a band across the central part of the town. They are drained by the Saranac River, which flows east through Oseetah Lake, then north through the village of Saranac Lake before exiting the town to the northeast and draining to Lake Champlain. The Raquette River, which flows northwest to the St. Lawrence River near Massena, crosses the southwestern part of Harrietstown.

== Demographics ==
Historical population
Census	Pop.	Note	%±
1850	181		—
1860	340		87.8%
1870	416		22.4%
1880	533		28.1%
1890	1,582		196.8%
1900	3,390		114.3%
1910	4,753		40.2%
1920	4,797		0.9%
1930	6,856		42.9%
1940	6,117		−10.8%
1950	6,014		−1.7%
1960	5,664		−5.8%
1970	5,643		−0.4%
1980	5,604		−0.7%
1990	5,621		0.3%
2000	5,575		−0.8%
2010	5,709		2.4%
2020	5,254		−8.0%
U.S. Decennial Census

As of the census of 2000, there were 5,575 people, 2,544 households, and 1,340 families residing in the town. The population density was 28.3 inhabitants per square mile (10.9/km^{2}). There were 3,417 housing units at an average density of 17.4 per square mile (6.7/km^{2}). The racial makeup of the town was 97.22% White, 0.52% African American, 0.34% Native American, 0.65% Asian, 0.22% from other races, and 1.06% from two or more races. Hispanic or Latino of any race were 1.06% of the population.

There were 2,544 households, out of which 27.2% had children under the age of 18 living with them, 38.8% were married couples living together, 9.4% had a female householder with no husband present, and 47.3% were non-families. 39.1% of all households were made up of individuals, and 14.3% had someone living alone who was 65 years of age or older. The average household size was 2.16 and the average family size was 2.91.

In the town, the population was spread out, with 22.8% under the age of 18, 9.8% from 18 to 24, 28.1% from 25 to 44, 24.1% from 45 to 64, and 15.1% who were 65 years of age or older. The median age was 39 years. For every 100 females, there were 94.2 males. For every 100 females age 18 and over, there were 91.8 males.

The median income for a household in the town was $31,838, and the median income for a family was $45,505. Males had a median income of $32,833 versus $25,407 for females. The per capita income for the town was $18,529. About 7.4% of families and 12.6% of the population were below the poverty line, including 9.3% of those under age 18 and 20.1% of those age 65 or over.

== Communities and locations in Harrietstown ==
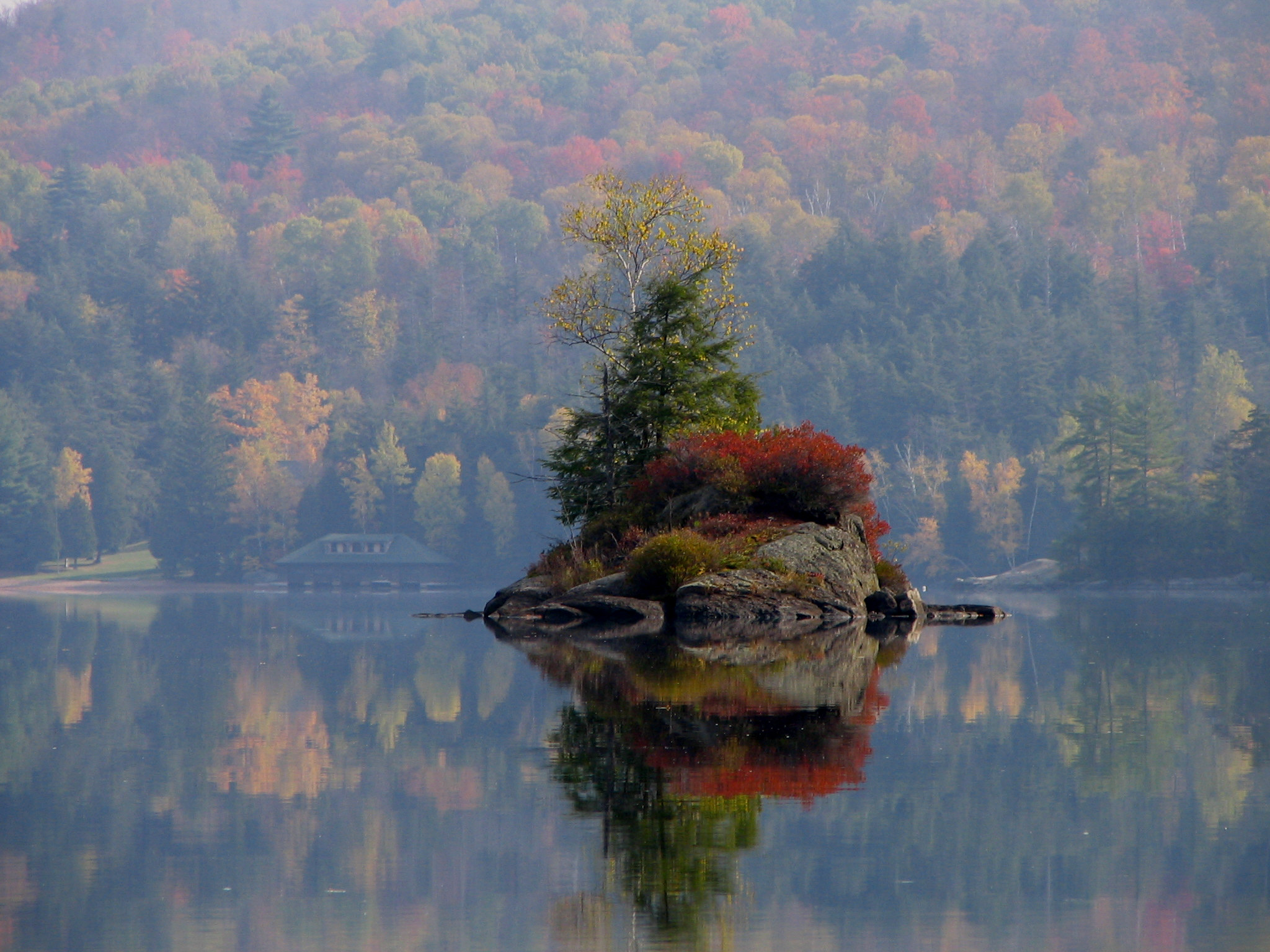
Lower Saranac Lake

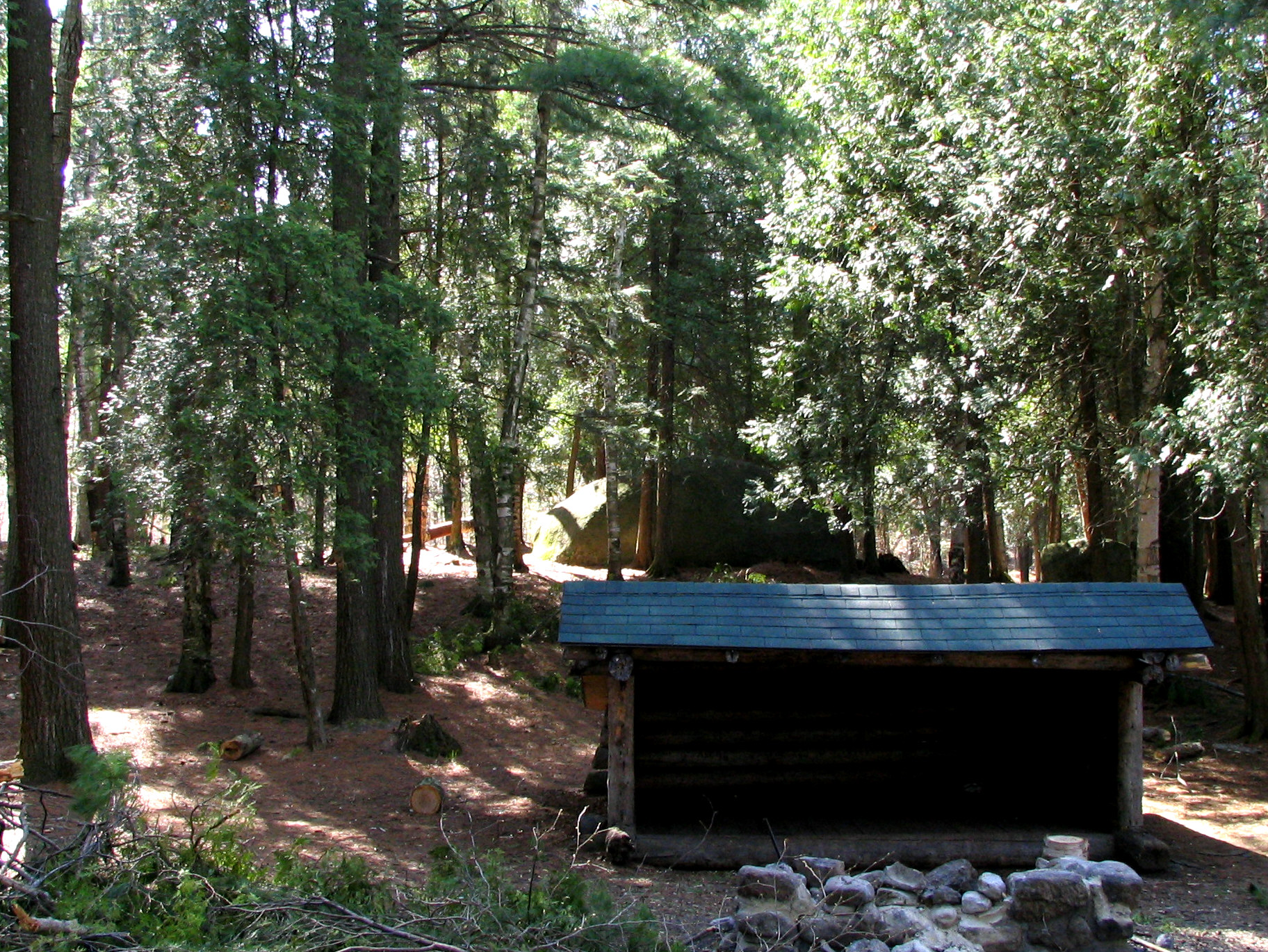
A lean-to at a campsite on Middle Saranac Lake

- Adirondack Regional Airport (SLK) – An airport in the northeastern part of the town that services the Saranac Lake region
- Axton Landing – A hamlet in the southern section of the town by the Raquette River and south of NY-30
- Coreys – A location in the southern part of the town, north of Axton Landing
- Eagle Island – A prominent island in Lower Saranac Lake
- Fish Creek Ponds – A location on the western side of Upper Saranac Lake
- Follensby Pond – A lake by the western town line
- Harrietstown – A hamlet near the eastern town boundary on NY-86 and east of the airport
- Lake Clear – A lake near the western town line
- Lake Clear – A hamlet near the western town line on NY-30, south of the likewise-named lake
- Lake Clear Junction – A hamlet east of Lake Clear on NY-30
- Lake Colby – A hamlet north of Saranac Lake village on NY-86
- McMasters Crossing – A hamlet south of Lake Clear on County Road 50
- Lower Saranac Lake – A lake southwest of Saranac Lake village
- Middle Saranac Lake – A lake in the southern part of the town, mostly within the town
- Oseetah Lake – A lake on the eastern town line, south of Saranac Lake village
- Saranac Lake – Part of the Village of Saranac Lake is at the eastern town line at the junction of NY-3 and NY-86
- Upper St. Regis – A location on NY-30 by the northern town line
- Upper Saranac Lake – The southern end of the lake is in the western part of the town
- Wawbeek – A hamlet on NY-30 by the junction of County Road 45 at the western side of Upper Saranac Lake
