= Leis Block =

Historic commercial building in New York, United States

- U.S. National Register of Historic Places
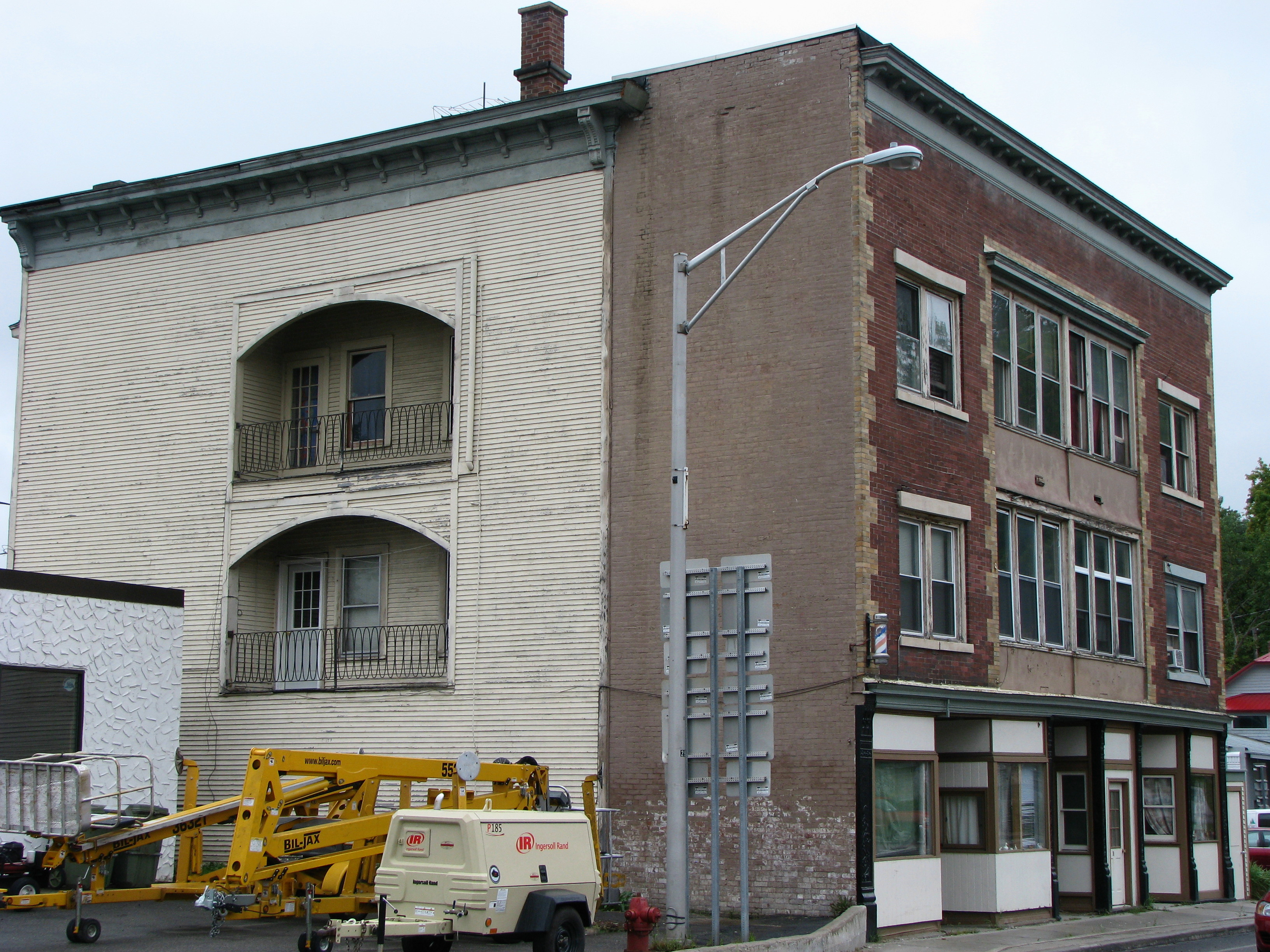
- Leis Block, September 2008

- Location within New York Location within the United States
- Location: 3-5 Bloomingdale Ave., Saranac Lake, Harrietstown, New York, U.S.
- Coordinates: 44°19′44″N 74°7′59″W
- Area: less than one acre
- Built: 1902
- Architectural style: Classical Revival
- MPS: Saranac Lake MPS
- NRHP reference No.: 92001449
- Added to NRHP: November 6, 1992

Leis Block is a historic commercial building located at Saranac Lake in the town of Harrietstown, Franklin County, New York. It was built in 1902 and is a three-story wood-frame structure. Renovations between 1910 and 1914 that added the current brick front, resulted in four full apartments, each containing a central inset sleeping porch. The storefronts once were occupied by Henry Leis's piano and music store and Earl Finegan's pharmacy. Henry Leis, who owned the block until his death in 1940, also built the Leis Cottage. The current structure has ten apartments and two storefronts. The pharmacy at one time was named Terminal Pharmacy because it was the bus stop. Later it was renamed Hoffman Pharmacy.

It was listed on the National Register of Historic Places in 1992.
