= Stonaker Cottage =

Historic house in New York, United States

- U.S. National Register of Historic Places
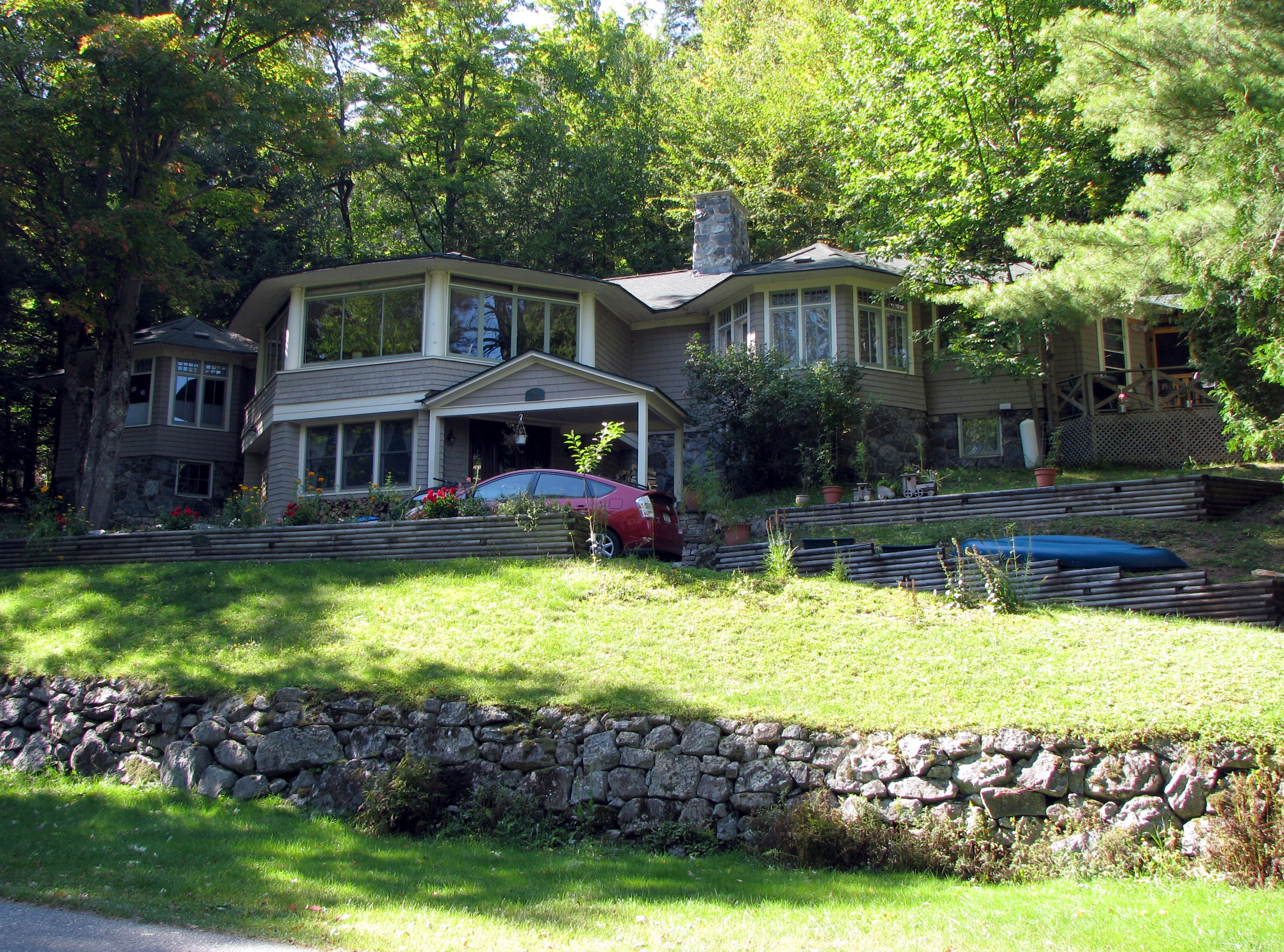
- Stonaker Cottage, September 2008

- Location within New York Location within the United States
- Location: Glenwood Rd., Saranac Lake, Harrietstown, New York, U.S.
- Coordinates: 44°18′57″N 74°8′7″W
- Area: 0 acres (0 ha)
- Built: 1916
- Architectural style: Prairie School
- MPS: Saranac Lake MPS
- NRHP reference No.: 92001465
- Added to NRHP: November 6, 1992

Stonaker Cottage is a historic cure cottage located at Saranac Lake in the town of Harrietstown, Franklin County, New York. It was built in 1916 for the personal use of Edwin and Jeanne Stonaker. It is a one-story, wood-frame dwelling sided in shingles and covered by a shallow pitched asphalt roof with deep overhanging eaves. It features a large central octagonal cure porch with quartz windows, flanked by two smaller hexagonal bays.

It was sold in 1932, and was listed on the National Register of Historic Places in 1992.
