= Colbath Cottage =

Historic house in New York, United States

- U.S. National Register of Historic Places
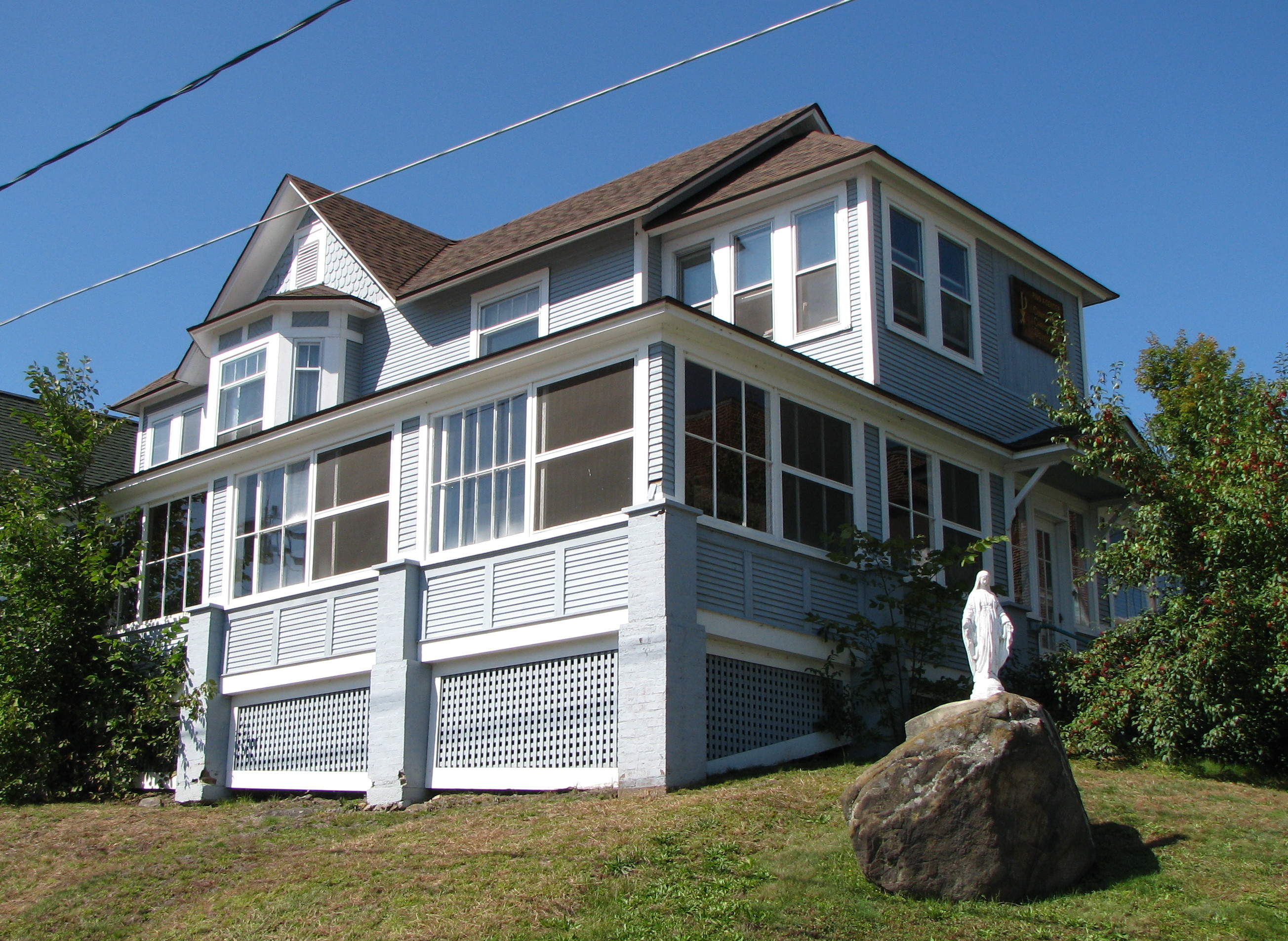
- Colbath Cottage, September 2008

- Location within New York Location within the United States
- Location: 30 River St., Saranac Lake, Harrietstown, New York, U.S.
- Coordinates: 44°19′29″N 74°07′45″W
- Area: less than one acre
- Built: 1896
- Architectural style: Colonial Revival, Queen Anne
- MPS: Saranac Lake MPS
- NRHP reference No.: 92001433
- Added to NRHP: November 6, 1992

Colbath Cottage is a historic cure cottage located at Saranac Lake in the town of Harrietstown, Franklin County, New York. It was built in 1896 and is a 2 1/2-story, wood-frame building on a rubble stone foundation, clad in wooden clapboard and shingles in a staggered butt pattern, and covered by a multiple gable roof.

It was listed on the National Register of Historic Places in 1992.
