= Camp Intermission =

- U.S. National Register of Historic Places
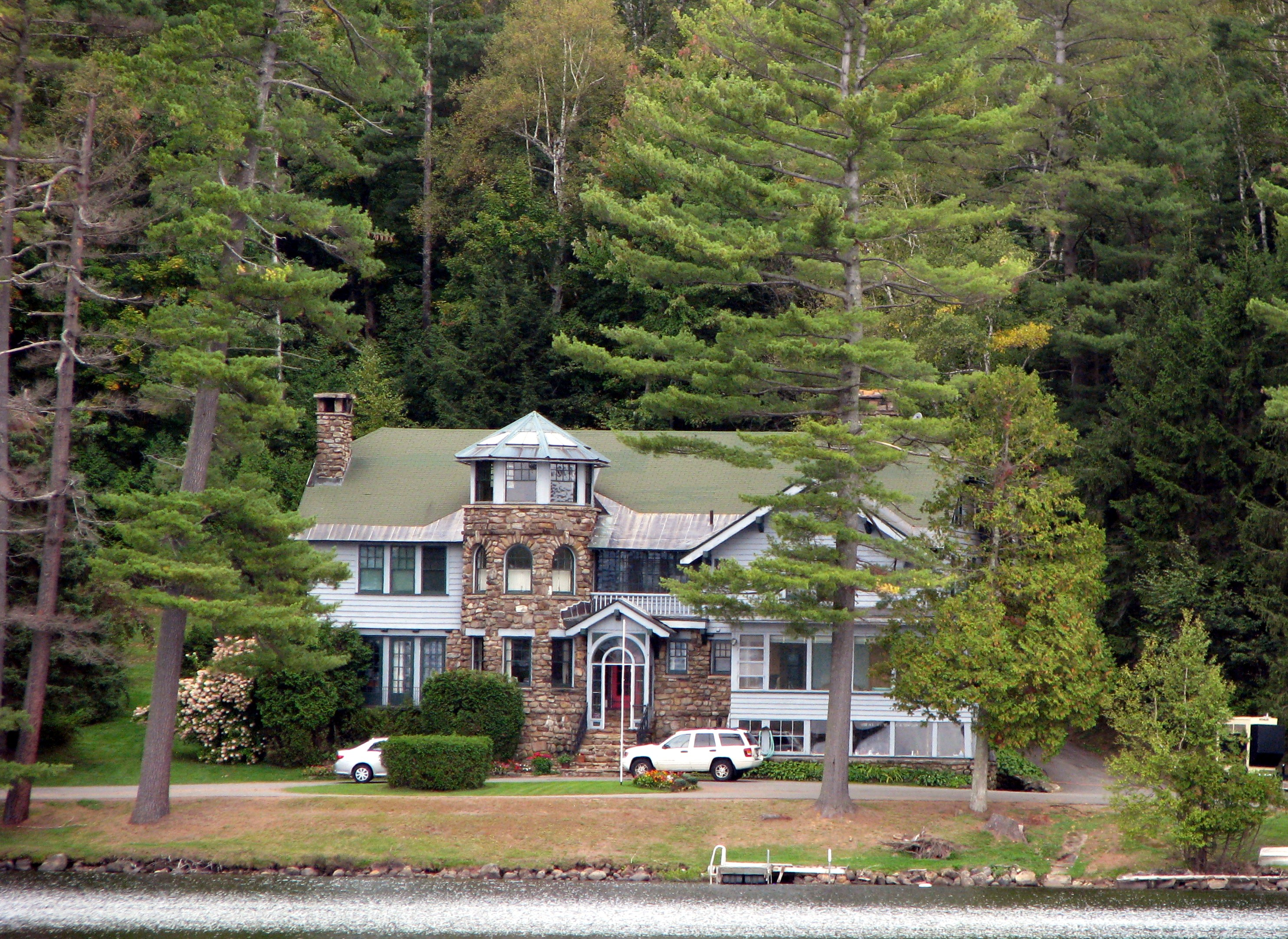
- Camp Intermission, July 2008

- Location within New York Location within the United States
- Location: Northwest Bay Rd., Saranac Lake, Harrietstown, New York, U.S.
- Coordinates: 44°20′54″N 74°08′56.3″W
- Area: 110 acres (45 ha)
- Built: 1928; 98 years ago
- Architectural style: Bungalow/Craftsman
- MPS: Saranac Lake MPS
- NRHP reference No.: 92001421
- Added to NRHP: November 6, 1992

Camp Intermission, also known as William Morris House, is a historic Great Camp located on Lake Colby just outside the village of Saranac Lake in the town of Harrietstown, Franklin County, New York. It was built in 1928 for theatrical agent William Morris, designed by William G. Distin. The property includes the main house and seven contributing outbuildings. The house is a 2 1/2-story, rectangular wood and stone dwelling with a rear kitchen wing. The house features elaborately patterned stone arches and sills and a "cure porch." The outbuildings include a wood shed, machine shed housing a wood cutter, wellhouse, root cellar, ice house, barn, and a caretaker's house.

It was listed on the National Register of Historic Places in 1992.
