= Jennings Cottage =

Historic house in New York, United States

- U.S. National Register of Historic Places
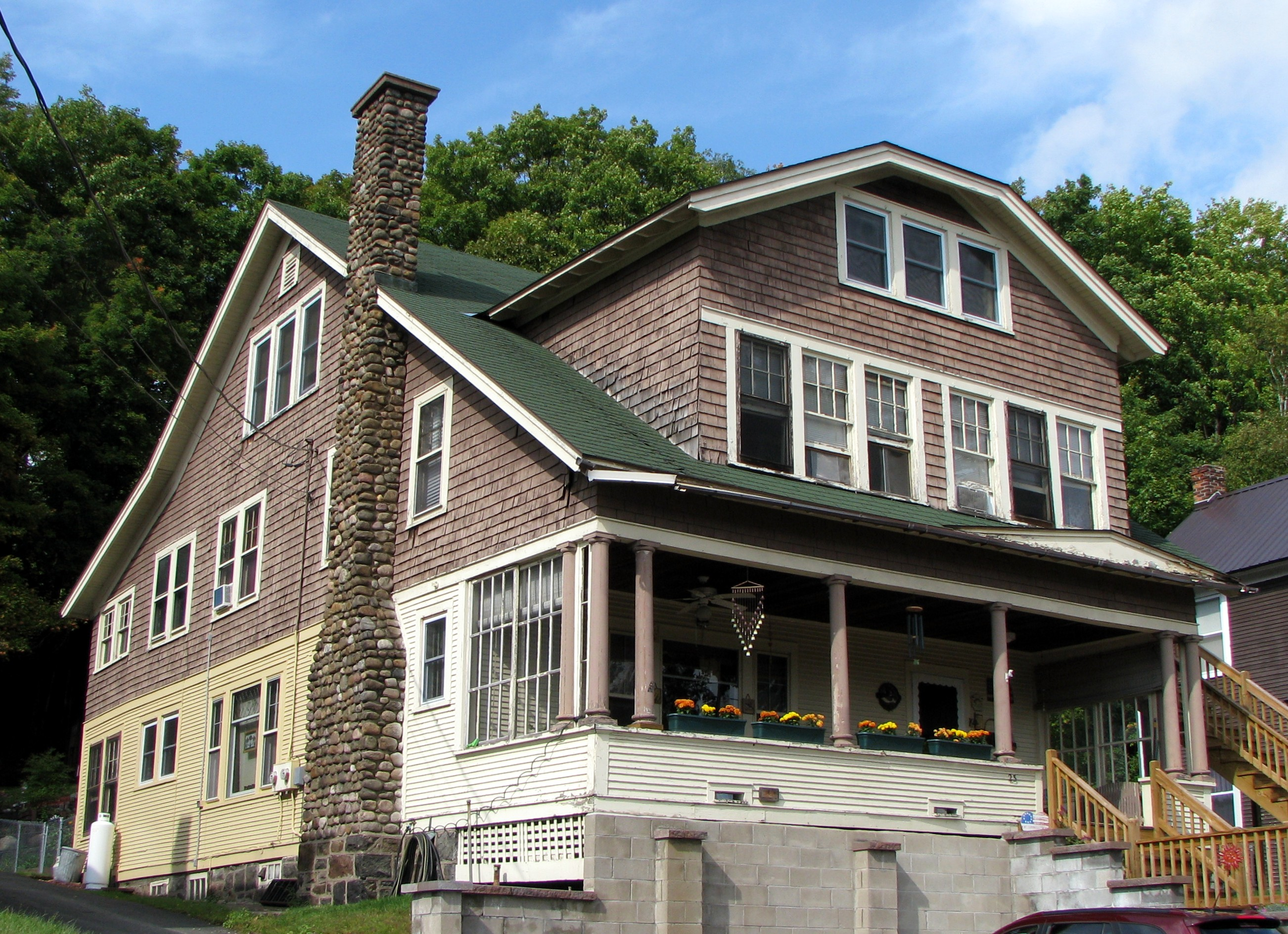
- Jennings Cottage, September 2008

- Location within New York Location within the United States
- Location: 16 Marshall St., Saranac Lake, Harrietstown, New York, U.S.
- Coordinates: 44°19′51″N 74°7′50″W
- Area: less than one acre
- Built: 1897
- Architectural style: Bungalow/Craftsman
- MPS: Saranac Lake MPS
- NRHP reference No.: 92001419
- Added to NRHP: November 6, 1992

Jennings Cottage is a historic cure cottage located at Saranac Lake in the town of Harrietstown, Franklin County, New York. It was built about 1897 and modified in 1923 to its present form. It is a bungalow style dwelling with a broad, low pitched gable roof with exposed rasters and a large cobblestone chimney. It features a large two story gable roof dormer over a full inset front verandah supported by Doric order columns. It was operated as a commercial boarding cottage.

It was listed on the National Register of Historic Places in 1992.
