= Feisthamel-Edelberg Cottage =

Historic house in New York, United States

- U.S. National Register of Historic Places
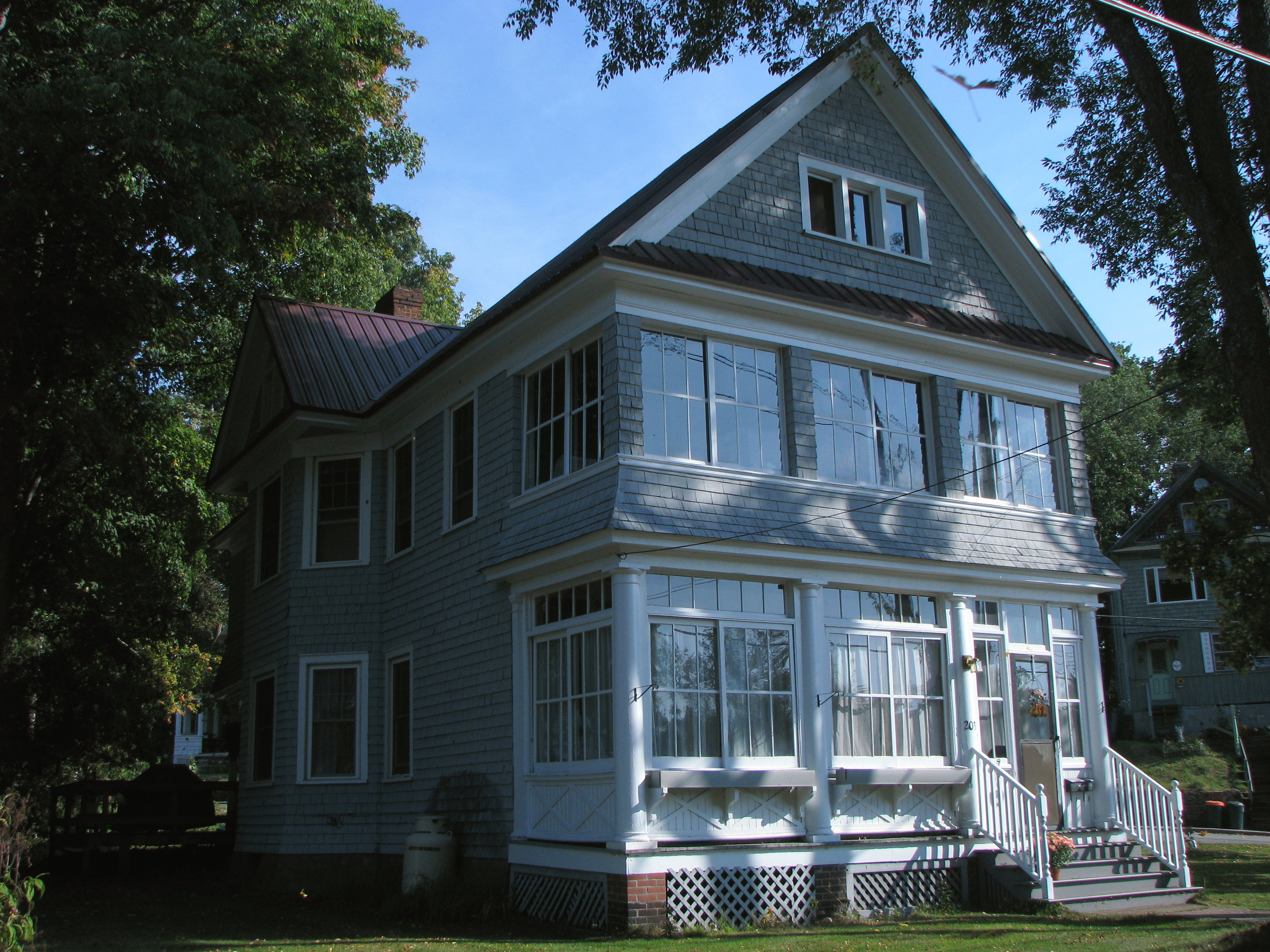
- Feisthamel-Edelberg Cottage, September 2008

- Location within New York Location within the United States
- Location: 11 Neil St., Saranac Lake, Harrietstown, New York, U.S.
- Coordinates: 44°19′44″N 74°8′11″W
- Area: less than one acre
- Built: 1915
- Architectural style: Colonial Revival
- MPS: Saranac Lake MPS
- NRHP reference No.: 92001420
- Added to NRHP: November 6, 1992

Feisthamel-Edelberg Cottage is a historic cure cottage located at Saranac Lake in the town of Harrietstown, Franklin County, New York. It was built about 1915 and is a 2 1/2-story, three- by five-bay frame dwelling clad in wood shingles. It sits on a brick and concrete foundation and has a cross-gable roof. It features a 2-story cure porch with Colonial Revival style details.

It was listed on the National Register of Historic Places in 1992.
