= Leis Cottage =

Historic house in New York, United States

- U.S. National Register of Historic Places
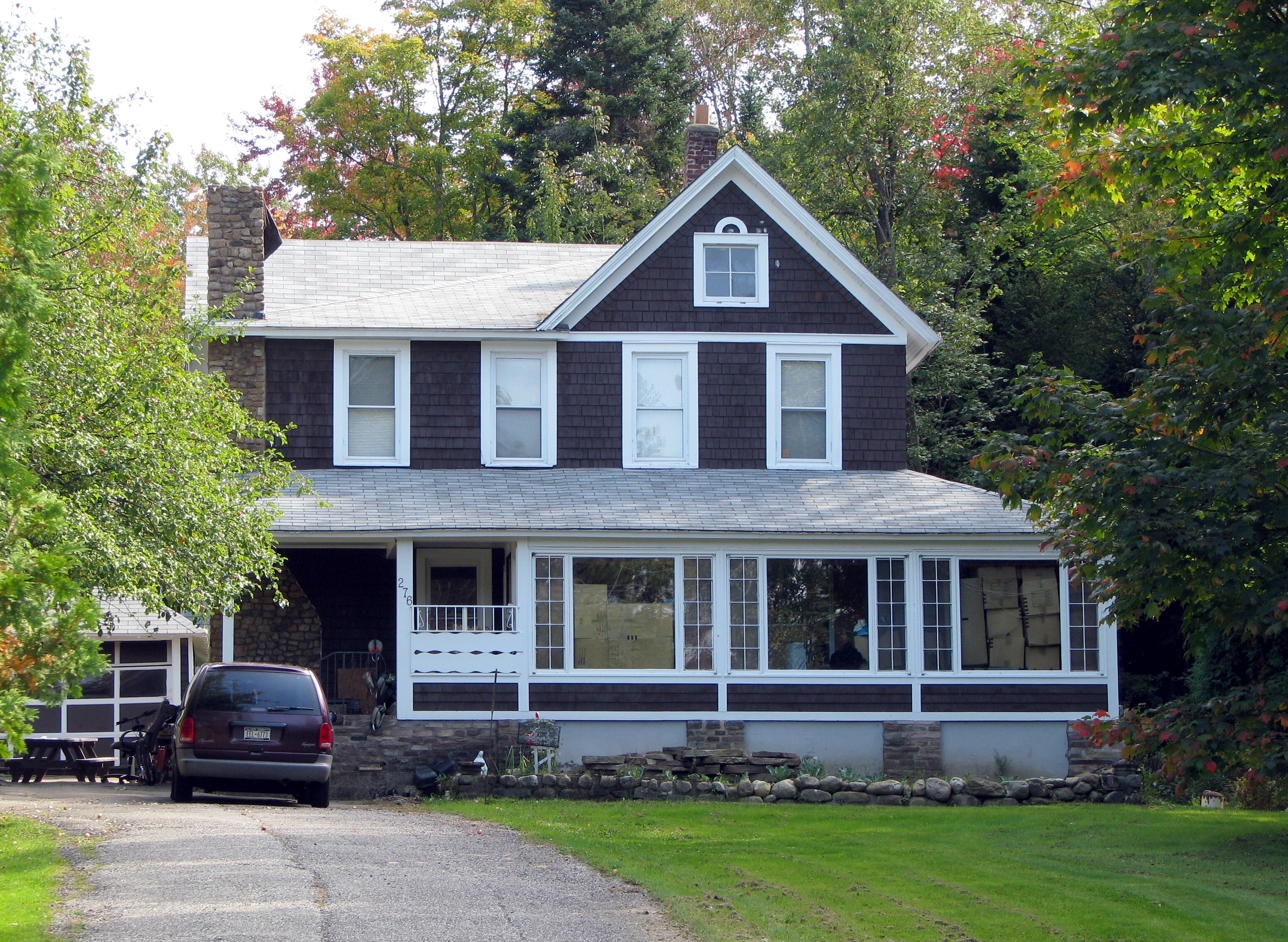
- Leis Cottage, September 2008

- Location within New York Location within the United States
- Location: 26 Algonquin Ave., Saranac Lake, Harrietstown, New York, U.S.
- Coordinates: 44°19′14″N 74°8′59″W
- Area: 9 acres (3.6 ha)
- Built: 1904
- Architectural style: Queen Anne, Cure cottage
- MPS: Saranac Lake MPS
- NRHP reference No.: 92001444
- Added to NRHP: November 6, 1992

Leis Cottage, also known as Camp Leisure, is a historic cure cottage located at Saranac Lake in the town of Harrietstown, Franklin County, New York. It was built in 1904 and is a 2 1/2-story, L-shaped wood-frame structure with a gable roof and projecting cross-gable in the Queen Anne style. It has a large verandah and second story sleeping porch. It features a cobblestone chimney and porte cochere. Henry Leis, who operated a piano and music store, also owned the Leis Block.

It was listed on the National Register of Historic Places in 1992.
