= Ellenberger Cottage =

Historic house in New York, United States

- U.S. National Register of Historic Places
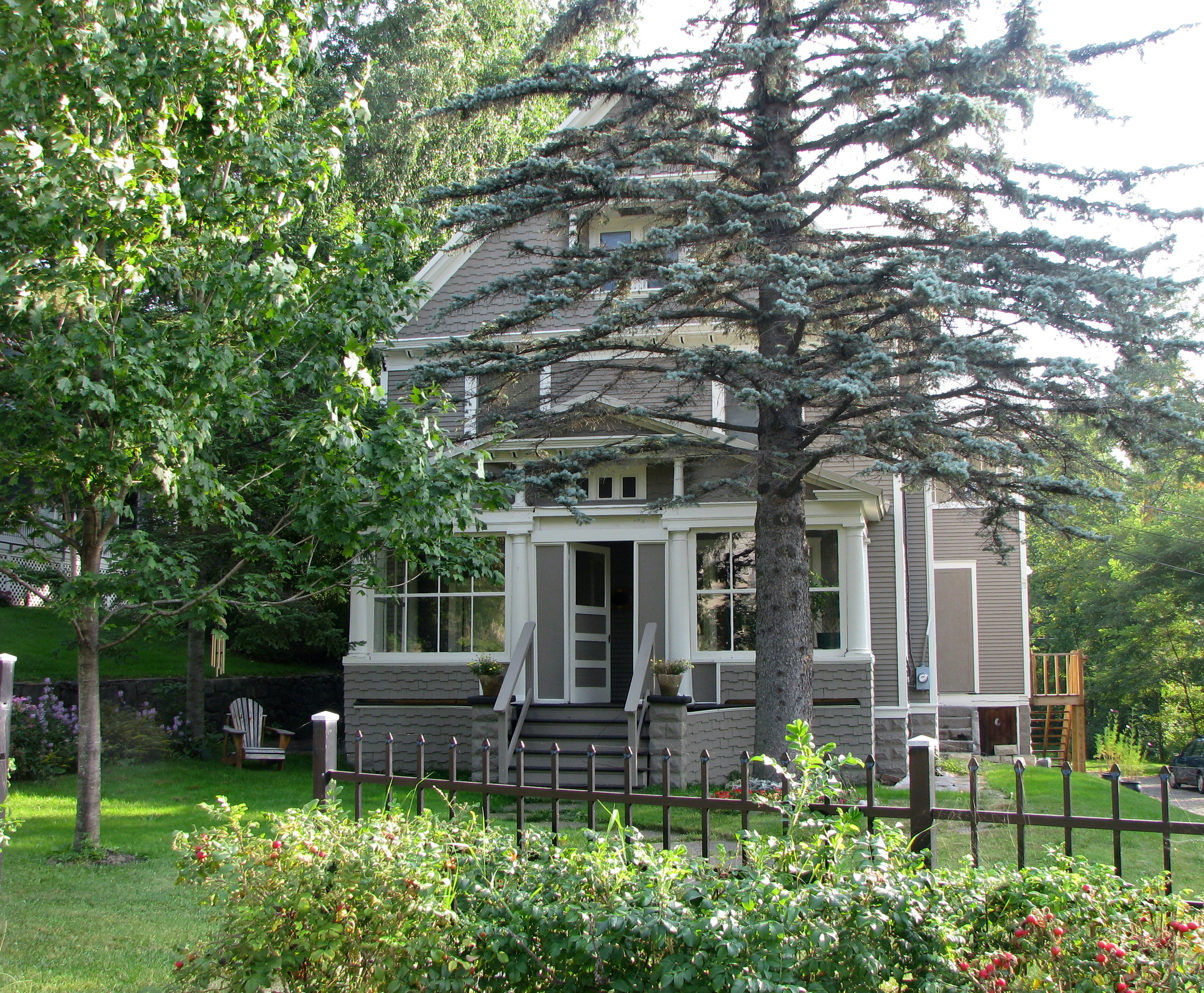
- Ellenberger Cottage, September 2008

- Location within New York Location within the United States
- Location: 183 Broadway, Saranac Lake, Harrietstown, New York, U.S.
- Coordinates: 44°19′55″N 74°8′16″W
- Area: less than one acre
- Built: 1914
- Architectural style: Queen Anne
- MPS: Saranac Lake MPS
- NRHP reference No.: 92001453
- Added to NRHP: November 6, 1992

Ellenberger Cottage is a historic cure cottage located at Saranac Lake in the town of Harrietstown, Franklin County, New York. It was built in 1914 and is a 2 1/2-story, wood-frame dwelling on a concrete block foundation, clad in wooden clapboard and shingles in staggered butt pattern and surmounted by a gable roof clad in asphalt shingles. The building is inspired by Queen Anne style architecture and has a 1-story verandah with classically detailed columns and portico.

It was listed on the National Register of Historic Places in 1992.
