= Lake Colby =

Lake in Franklin County, New York, United States

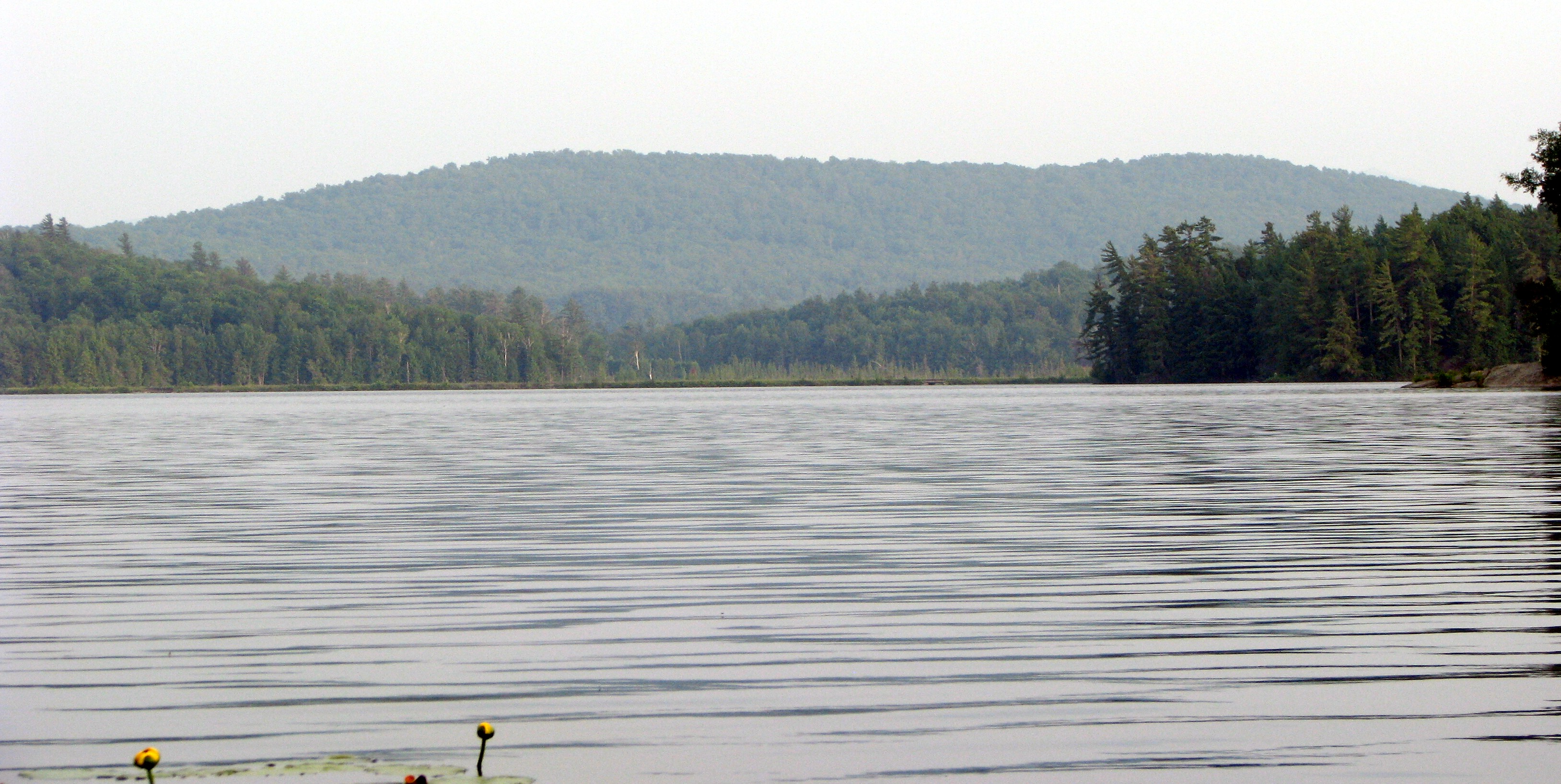

- Location within New York Lake Colby (the United States)
- Location: Franklin County, New York
- Coordinates: 44°20′35″N 74°09′12″W
- Basin countries: United States
- Surface area: 310 acres (1.3 km^{2})
- Surface elevation: 1,555 feet (474 m)

Lake Colby is a 272-acre (1.10 km^{2}) lake, located on NY-86 just outside the village of Saranac Lake, in Franklin County, New York in the Adirondacks; its outlet feeds into Lower Saranac Lake. Lake Colby is also the name of a hamlet located just north of the lake on NY-86.

The village beach of Saranac Lake is on Lake Colby, and New York State operates a boat launch and fishing access; there is a ten horsepower limit for motorboats. Harrietstown operates Latour Park on its shore, providing picnicking and shore fishing. Less than 8% of its 3.7 miles (6.0 km) of shoreline is privately owned. There are two approved campsites on the lake.

Camp Colby, the Lake Colby Environmental Education Camp for 11- to 13-year-olds, is located on the western shore. Originally a private estate built by theatrical agent William Morris, whose clients were invited there for rest and relaxation, it was then known as Camp Intermission. Camp Colby opened as a boy's conservation education camp in 1963; in 1971 it became co-educational.

The Adirondack Medical Center hospital is located on the eastern shore of Lake Colby.
