= Walker Cottage =

Historic house in New York, United States

- U.S. National Register of Historic Places
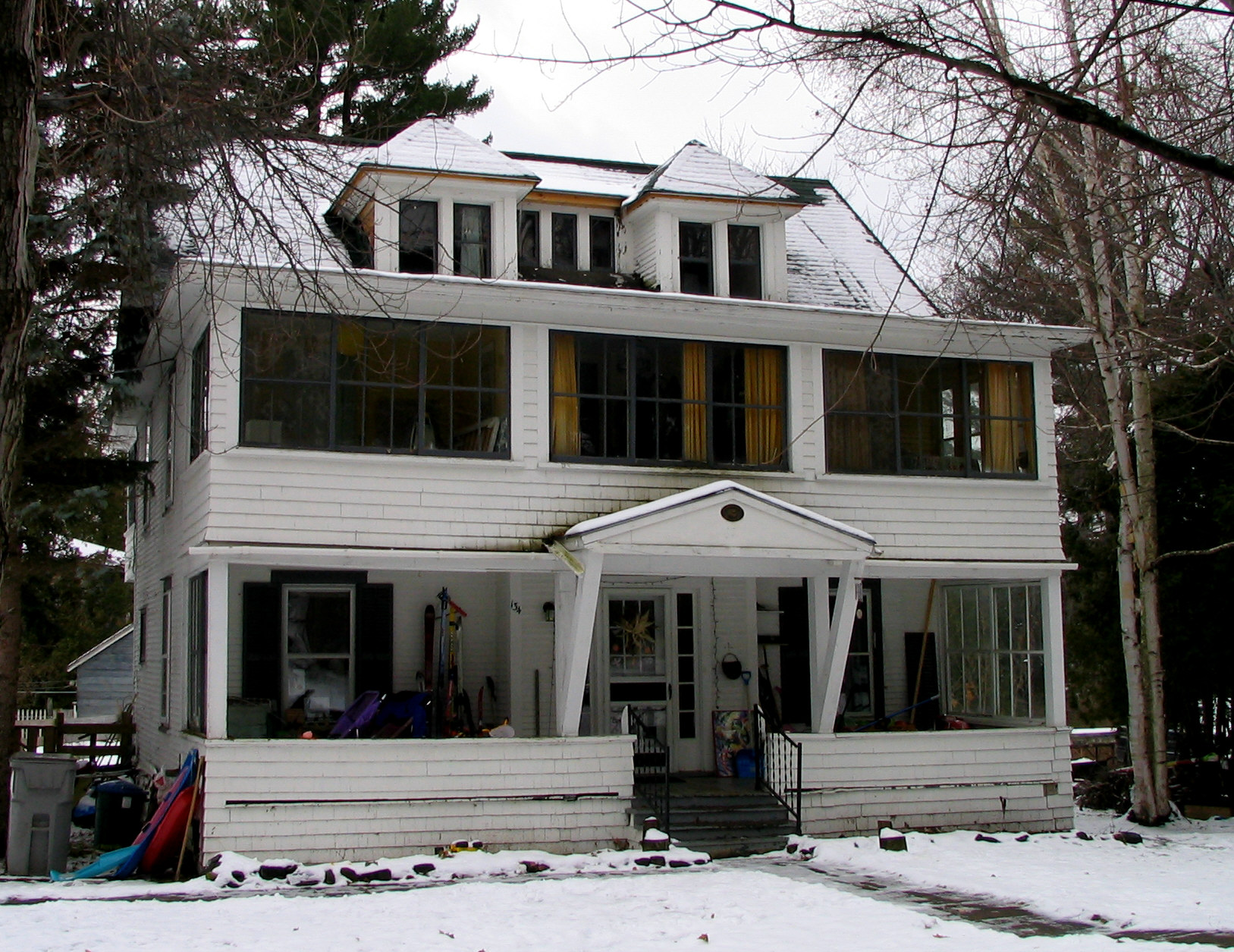
- Walker Cottage, November 2007

- Location within New York Location within the United States
- Location: 67 Park Ave., Saranac Lake, Harrietstown, New York, U.S.
- Coordinates: 44°19′57″N 74°8′1″W
- Area: less than one acre
- Built: 1904
- Architect: Durgan, Robert; Durgan, David
- Architectural style: Colonial Revival
- MPS: Saranac Lake MPS
- NRHP reference No.: 92001424
- Added to NRHP: November 6, 1992

Walker Cottage is a historic cure cottage located at Saranac Lake in the town of Harrietstown, Franklin County, New York. It was built in 1904 and is a 2 1/2-story, rectangular wood-frame dwelling with front and rear additions. It features a total of eight cure porches. An open verandah across the front facade with three sleeping porches above. A small gabled portico extends out from the front of the verandah.

It was listed on the National Register of Historic Places in 1992.
