= Feustmann Cottage =

Historic house in New York, United States

- U.S. National Register of Historic Places
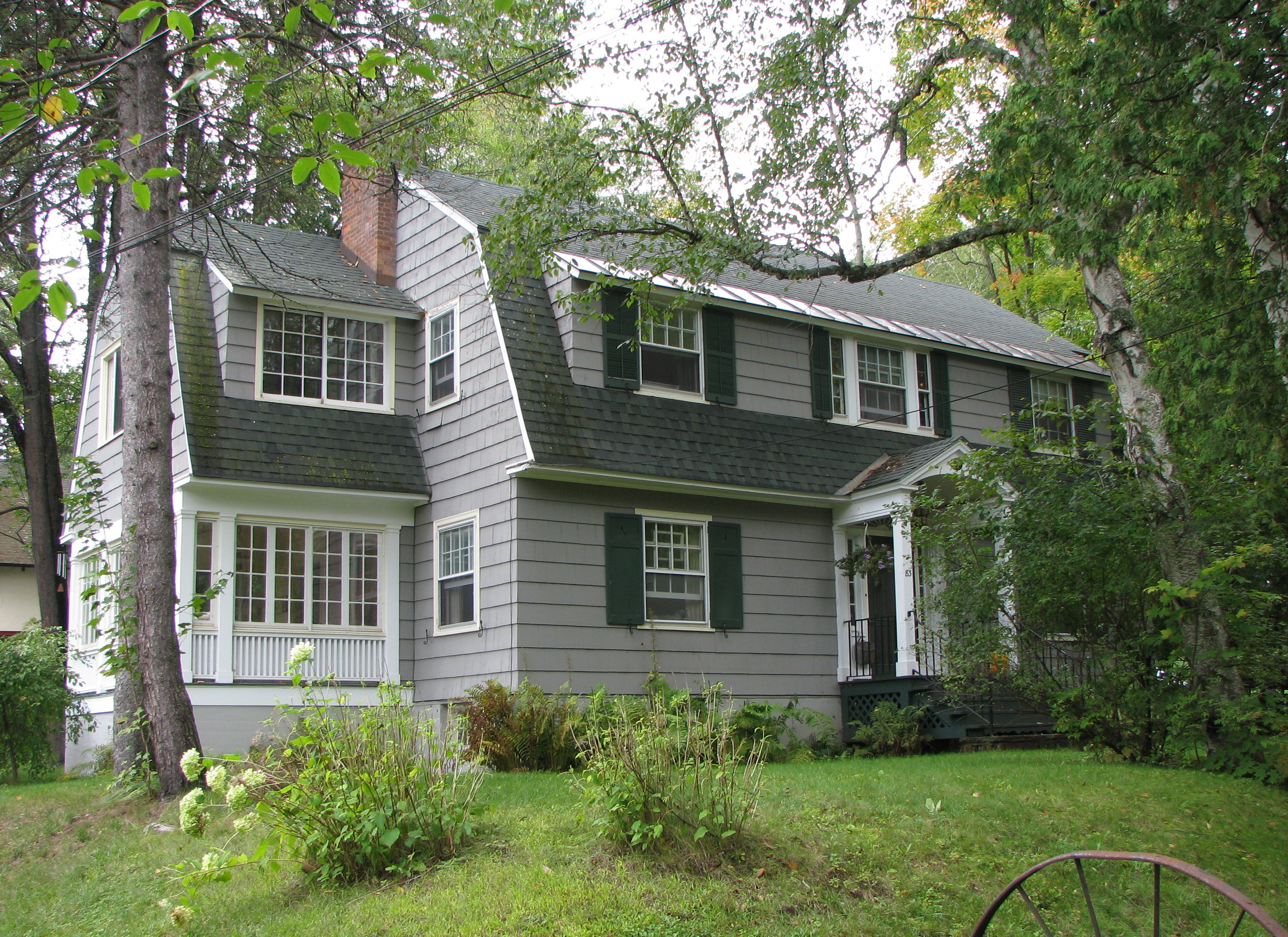
- Feustmann Cottage, September 2008

- Location within New York Location within the United States
- Location: 28 Catherine St., Saranac Lake, Harrietstown, New York, U.S.
- Coordinates: 44°19′58″N 74°7′50″W
- Area: less than one acre
- Built: 1923
- Architect: Feustmann, Maurice
- Architectural style: Colonial Revival
- MPS: Saranac Lake MPS
- NRHP reference No.: 92001455
- Added to NRHP: November 06, 1992

Feustmann Cottage is a historic cure cottage located at Saranac Lake in the town of Harrietstown, Franklin County, New York. It was built in 1923 and is a two-story, gambrel roofed wood frame residence with shed dormers in the front and back. It features three cure porches and is in the Colonial Revival style.

It was listed on the National Register of Historic Places in 1992.
