= Cottage Row Historic District =

Historic district in New York, United States

- U.S. National Register of Historic Places
- U.S. Historic district
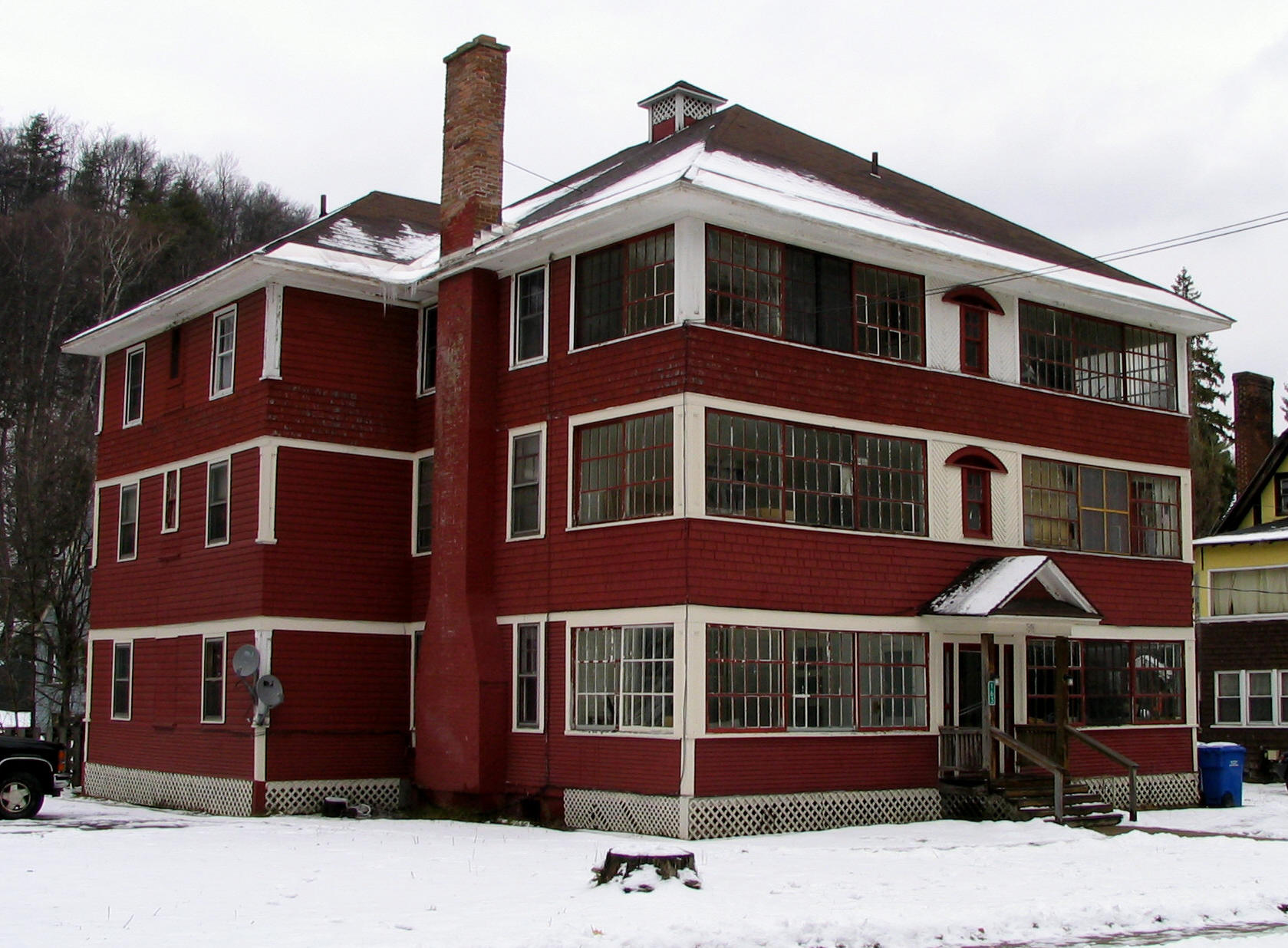
- Gonzales Cottage, November 2007

- Location within New York Location within the United States
- Location: Roughly, Park Ave. N side from Rosemont Ave. to Catherine St., Harrietstown, New York
- Coordinates: 44°19′59″N 74°8′0″W
- Area: 5 acres (2.0 ha)
- Built: 1900
- Architectural style: Colonial Revival, Tudor Revival, Shingle Style
- MPS: Saranac Lake MPS
- NRHP reference No.: 92001473
- Added to NRHP: November 6, 1992

Cottage Row Historic District is a national historic district located in Saranac Lake (Harrietstown) in Franklin County, New York. It includes 27 contributing privately owned single-family dwellings built between 1900 and 1940, with the majority constructed between 1907 and 1917. They are mostly two- or three-story, wood-framed structures, with gable or gambrel roofs, dormers, and wood siding or shingles. Most residences were operated as commercial, private tuberculosis sanitorium, with characteristic architectural features of the "cure cottage," including second story sleeping porches, extra wide doorways, and call bell systems.

It was listed on the National Register of Historic Places in 1992.
