= Hillside Lodge =

Historic house in New York, United States

- U.S. National Register of Historic Places
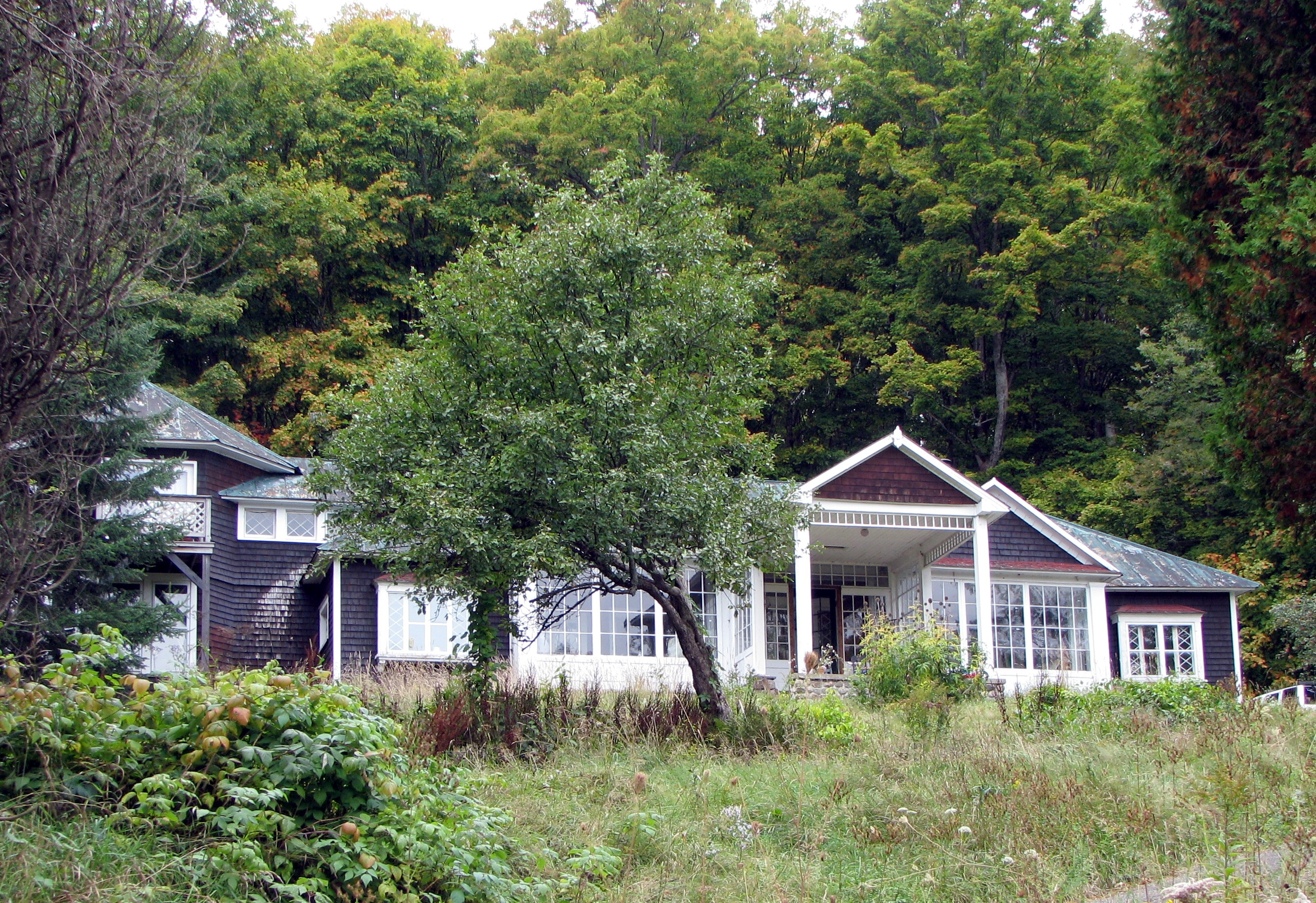
- Hillside Lodge, September 2008

- Location within New York Location within the United States
- Location: Harrietstown Rd., Saranac Lake, Harrietstown, New York, U.S.
- Coordinates: 44°21′18″N 74°8′47″W
- Area: 3.3 acres (1.3 ha)
- Built: 1920
- Architectural style: Colonial Revival, Queen Anne
- MPS: Saranac Lake MPS
- NRHP reference No.: 92001467
- Added to NRHP: November 6, 1992

Hillside Lodge is a historic cure cottage located at Saranac Lake in the town of Harrietstown, Franklin County, New York. It was built about 1920 and is a single-family, one-story dwelling clad in cedar shingles and surmounted by a standing-seam hipped roof. It has a two-story turret with solarium and a fieldstone chimney. It features two cure porches and has Colonial Revival and Queen Anne style details.

It was listed on the National Register of Historic Places in 1992.
