= Smith Cottage =

Historic house in New York, United States

- U.S. National Register of Historic Places
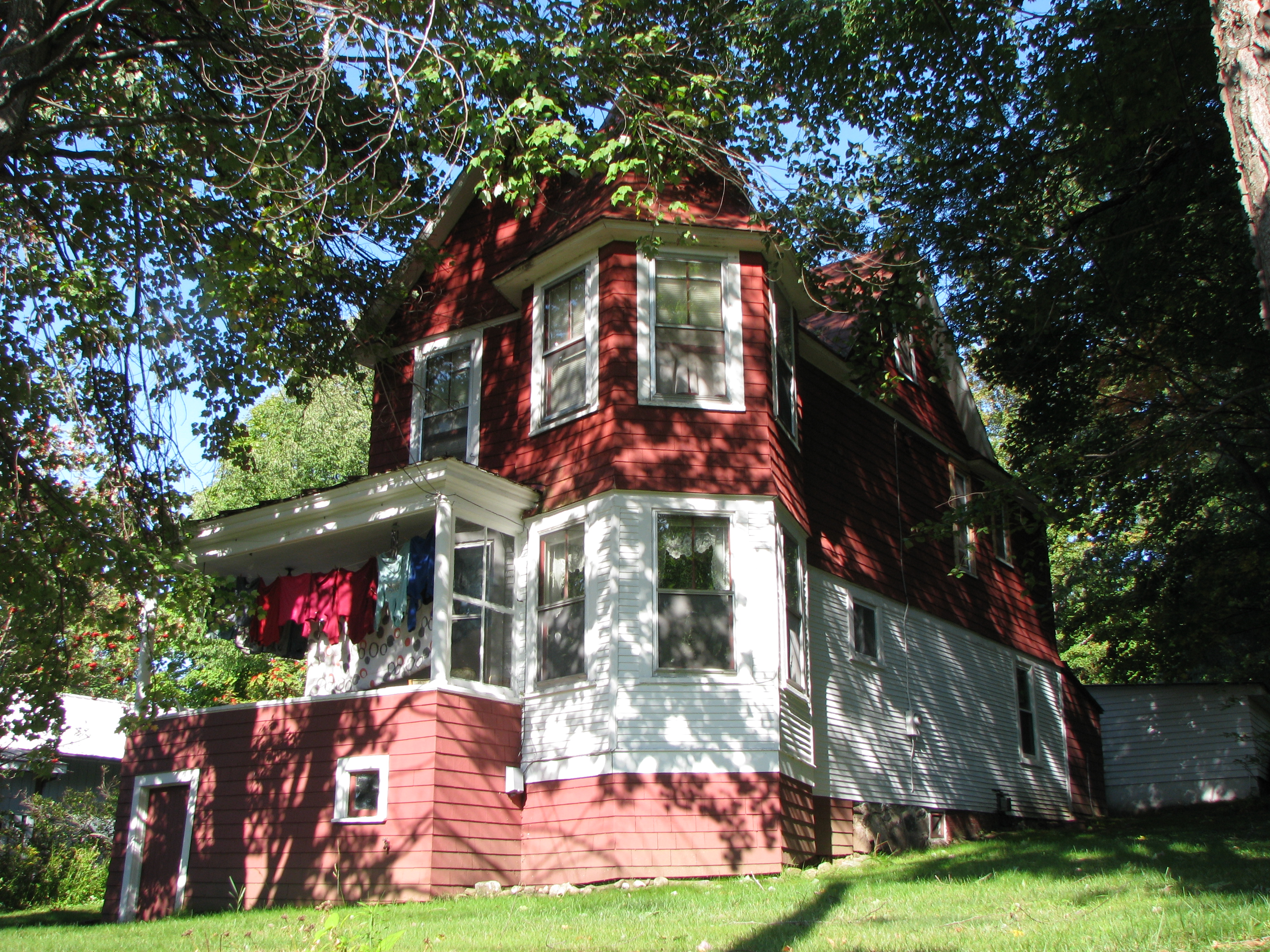
- Smith Cottage, September 2008

- Location within New York Location within the United States
- Location: 12 Jenkins St., Saranac Lake, Harrietstown, New York, U.S.
- Coordinates: 44°19′4″N 74°8′23″W
- Area: less than one acre
- Built: 1903
- Architectural style: Late 19th And 20th Century Revivals, Queen Anne
- MPS: Saranac Lake MPS
- NRHP reference No.: 92001470
- Added to NRHP: November 6, 1992

Smith Cottage is a historic cure cottage located at Saranac Lake in the town of Harrietstown, Franklin County, New York. It was built about 1903 and is a small 2 1/2-story, wood-frame dwelling sided in clapboard and shingles and covered by a cross-gable roof in the Queen Anne style. It features an open sitting-out porch under a second story overhang bordered by a round tower.

It was listed on the National Register of Historic Places in 1992.
