= Hopkins Cottage =

Historic house in New York, United States

- U.S. National Register of Historic Places
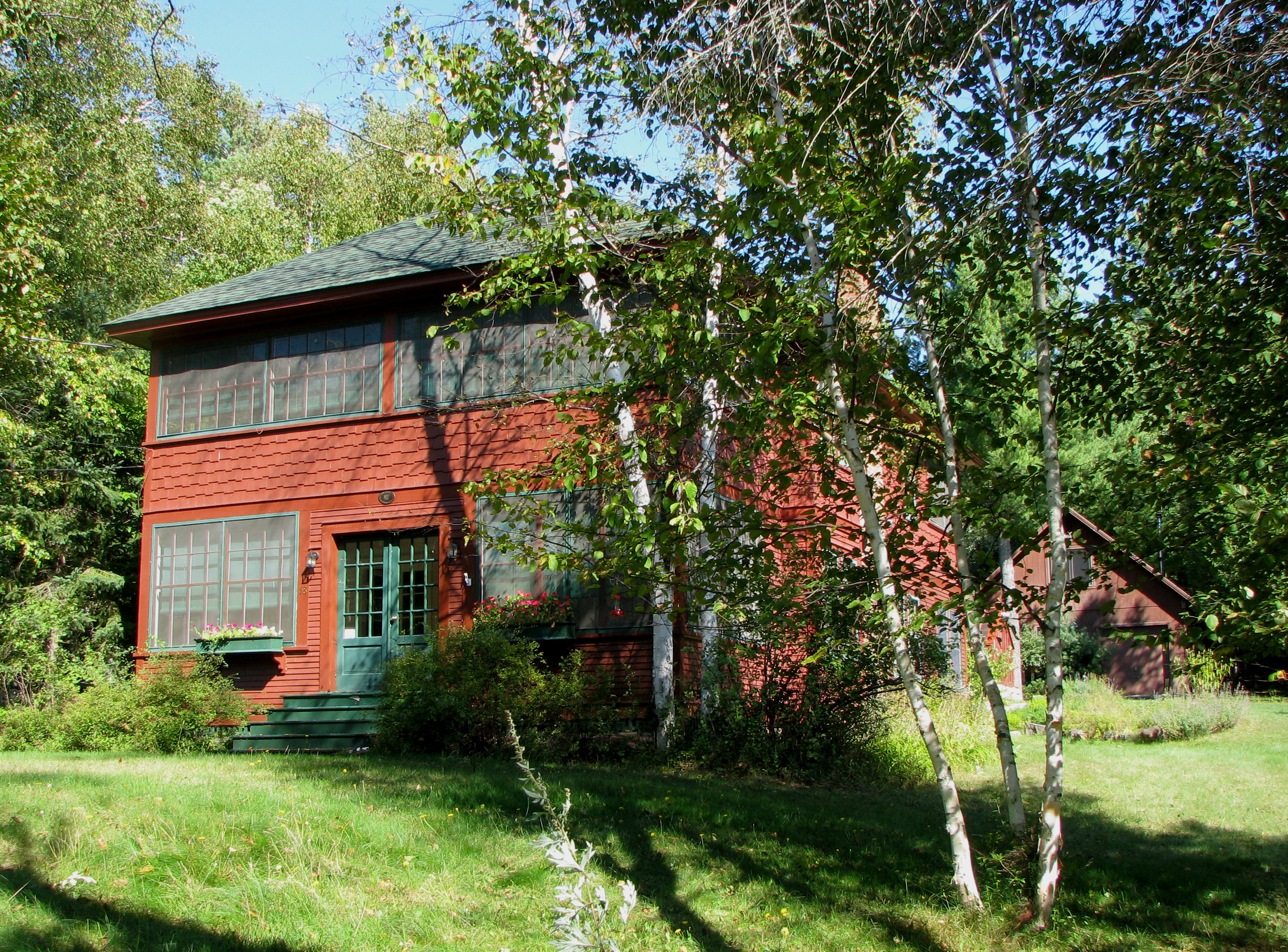
- Hopkins Cottage, September 2008

- Location within New York Location within the United States
- Location: 5 Birch St., Saranac Lake, Harrietstown, New York, U.S.
- Coordinates: 44°18′52″N 73°47′33″W
- Area: less than one acre
- Built: 1923
- Architectural style: Bungalow/Craftsman
- MPS: Saranac Lake MPS
- NRHP reference No.: 92001448
- Added to NRHP: November 06, 1992

Hopkins Cottage is a historic cure cottage located at Saranac Lake in the town of Harrietstown, Franklin County, New York. It was built in 1923 and is a rectangular two-story three-bay structure, surmounted by a hipped roof. Each of the four upstairs bedrooms has its own cure porch measuring 8.5 feet by 12 feet. It was used as a private nursing establishment for tuberculosis patients until about 1940.

It was listed on the National Register of Historic Places in 1992.
