= Ryan Cottage =

Historic house in New York, United States

- U.S. National Register of Historic Places
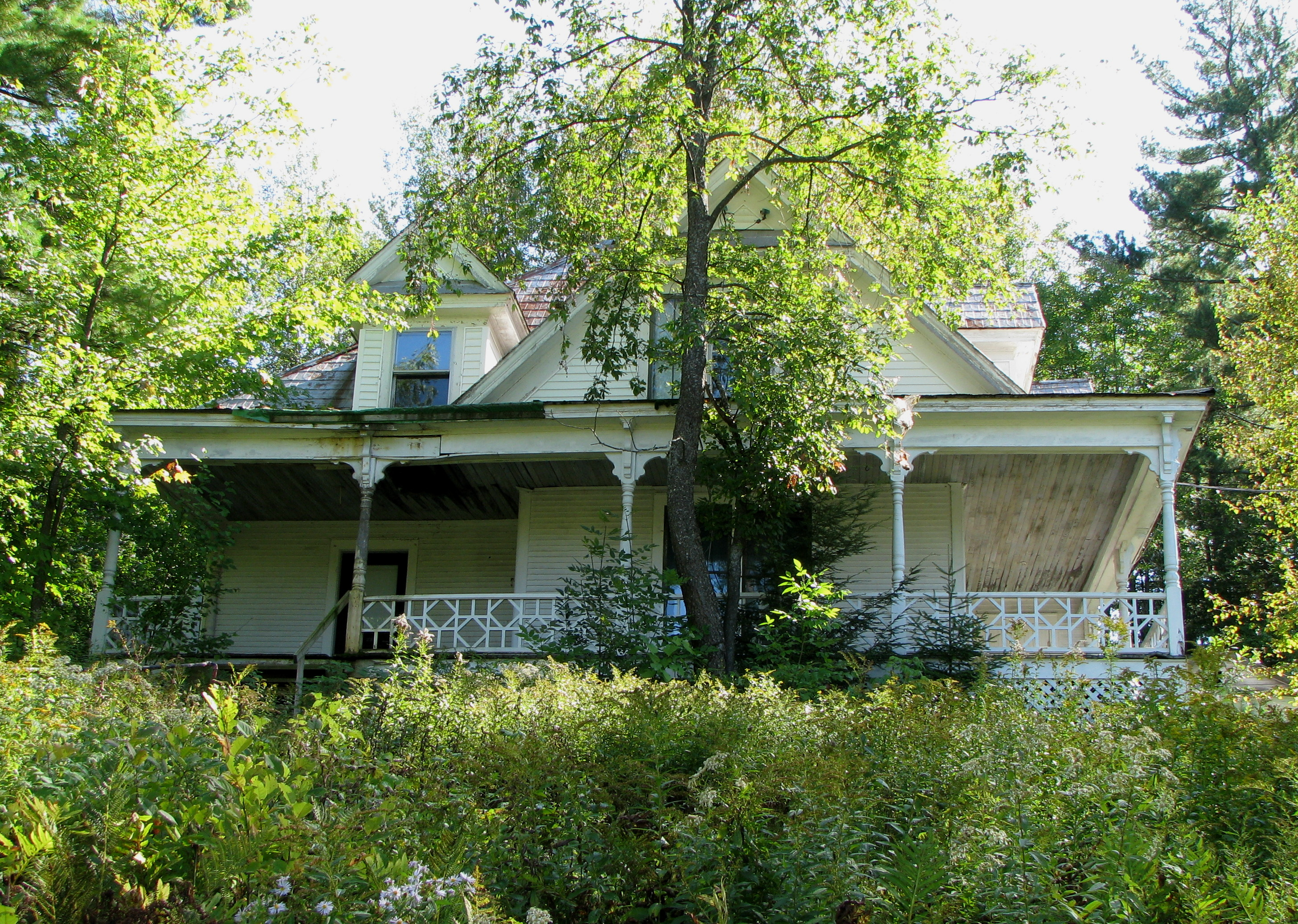
- Ryan Cottage, September 2008

- Location within New York Location within the United States
- Location: 62 Algonquin Ave., Saranac Lake, Harrietstown, New York, U.S.
- Coordinates: 44°19′6″N 74°9′10″W
- Area: less than one acre
- Built: 1893
- Architect: Ryan, John
- Architectural style: Queen Anne
- MPS: Saranac Lake MPS
- NRHP reference No.: 92001445
- Added to NRHP: November 6, 1992

Ryan Cottage is a historic cure cottage located at Saranac Lake in the town of Harrietstown in Franklin County, New York, USA. It was built in 1893 and is a 1 1/2-story, wood-frame dwelling with clapboard siding on a fieldstone foundation in the Queen Anne style. It has a central hipped roof obscured by multiple gables and gable dormers. It features a wraparound verandah.

It was listed on the National Register of Historic Places in 1992.
