= McBean Cottage =

Historic house in New York, United States

- U.S. National Register of Historic Places
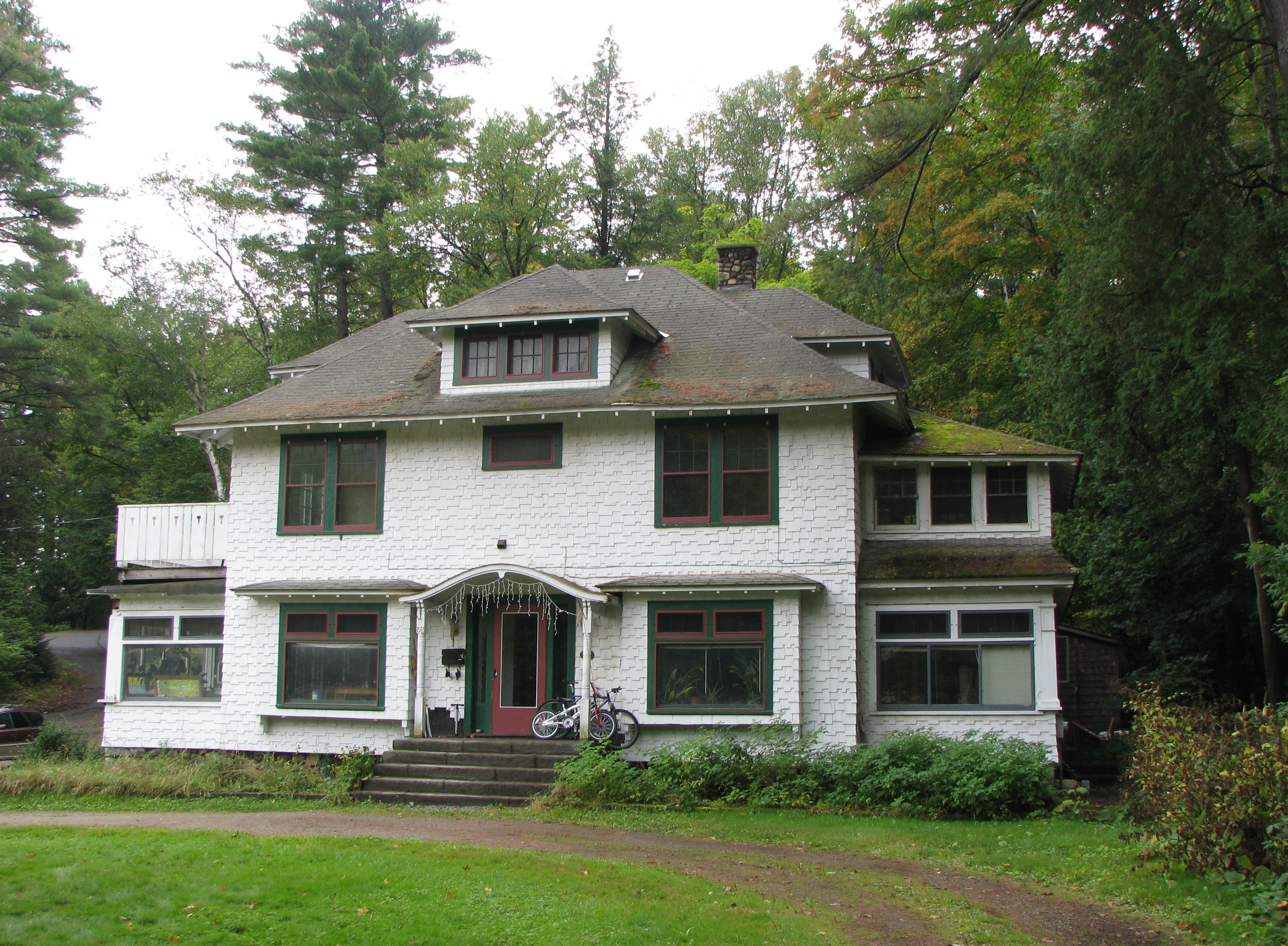
- McBean Cottage, September 2008

- Location within New York Location within the United States
- Location: 89 Park Ave., Saranac Lake, Harrietstown, New York, U.S.
- Coordinates: 44°19′57″N 74°7′51″W
- Area: less than one acre
- Built: 1920
- Architectural style: Colonial Revival, Bungalow/Craftsman
- MPS: Saranac Lake MPS
- NRHP reference No.: 92001425
- Added to NRHP: November 06, 1992

McBean Cottage is a historic cure cottage located at Saranac Lake in the town of Harrietstown, Franklin County, New York. It was built between 1915 and 1925 and is a 2 1/2-story, wood-frame structure on a fieldstone foundation. It is topped by a hipped roof with two hip-roofed dormers in the Colonial Revival style. It has American Craftsman details such as a cobblestone chimney, flared eaves, and wide overhangs with exposed rafters. It features two cure porches and a second-story sleeping porch.

It was listed on the National Register of Historic Places in 1992.
