= Johnson Cottage =

Historic house in New York, United States

- U.S. National Register of Historic Places
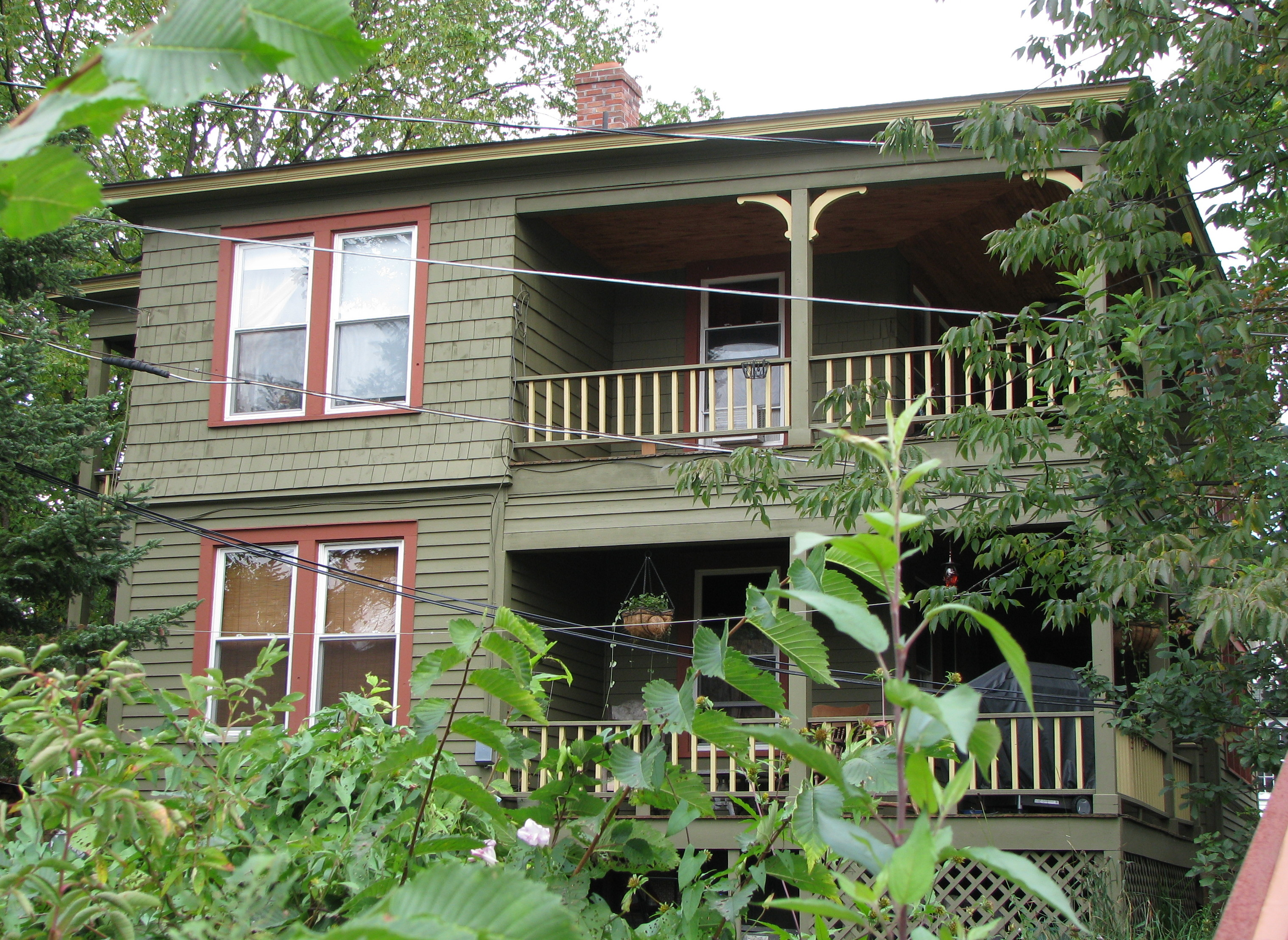
- Johnson Cottage, September 2008

- Location within New York Location within the United States
- Location: 6½ St. Bernard St., Saranac Lake, Harrietstown, New York, U.S.
- Coordinates: 44°19′32″N 74°7′55″W
- Area: less than one acre
- Built: 1896
- Architectural style: Queen Anne
- MPS: Saranac Lake MPS
- NRHP reference No.: 92001436
- Added to NRHP: November 6, 1992

Johnson Cottage is a historic cure cottage located at Saranac Lake in the town of Harrietstown, Franklin County, New York. It was built about 1896 and is a two-story frame structure, square in form and surmounted by a metal hipped roof. The roof extends on all four sides to subsidiary hipped roofs covering an unusual number of porches. It contains two apartments and each has four porches, added to the building about 1915. It features "over-under" verandahs at the southwest and northeast corners.

It was listed on the National Register of Historic Places in 1992.
