= Ames Cottage =

Historic house in New York, United States

- U.S. National Register of Historic Places
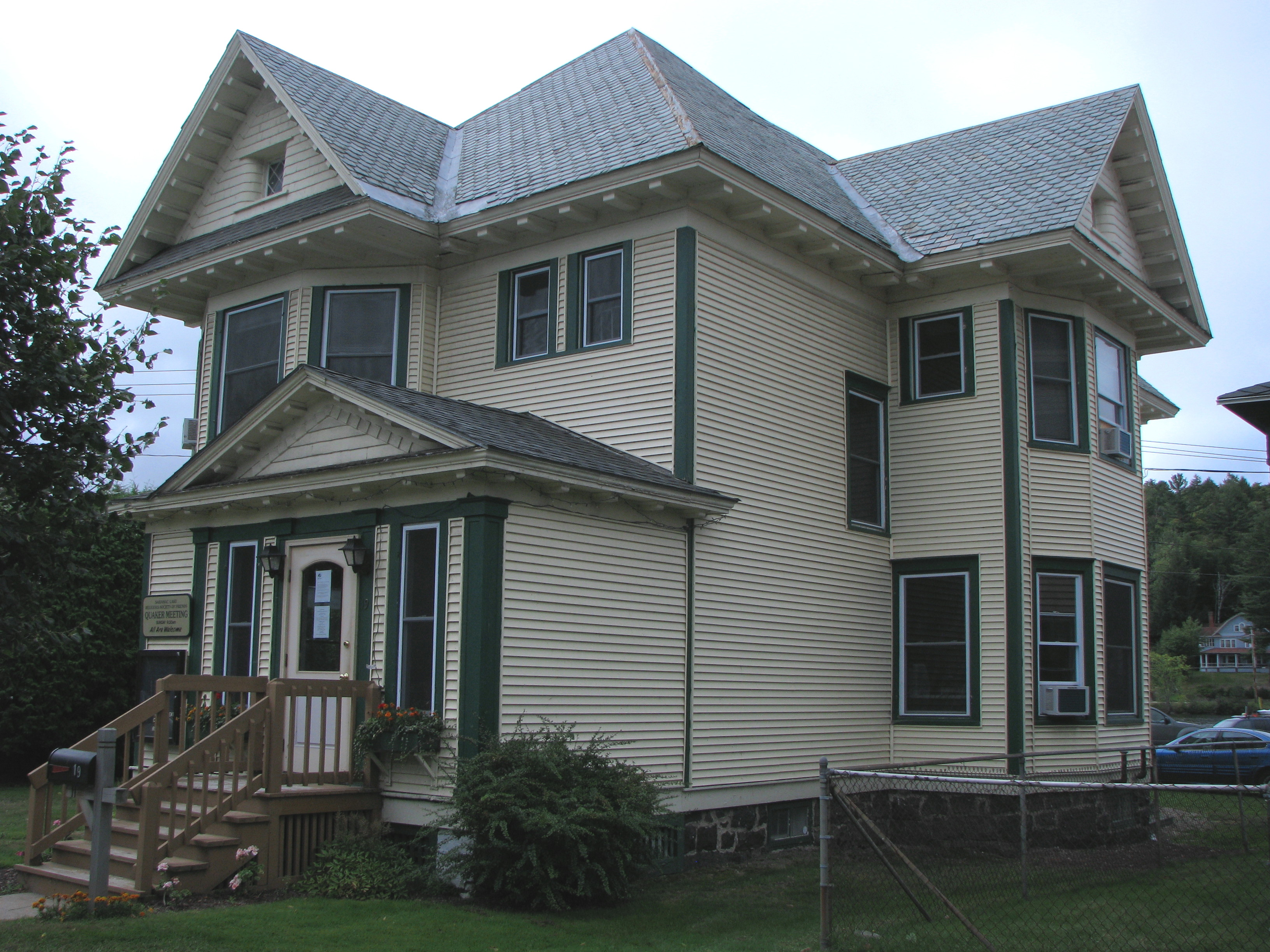
- Ames Cottage, September 2008

- Location within New York Location within the United States
- Location: 43 Church St., Saranac Lake, Harrietstown, New York, U.S.
- Coordinates: 44°19′29″N 74°7′40″W
- Area: less than one acre
- Built: 1906
- Architectural style: Queen Anne
- MPS: Saranac Lake MPS
- NRHP reference No.: 92001458
- Added to NRHP: November 6, 1992

Ames Cottage is a historic cure cottage located at Saranac Lake in the town of Harrietstown, Franklin County, New York. It was built in 1906 and is a 2 1/2-story wood-frame structure in an asymmetrical cruciform plan. It has four gables off a central hipped roof, deep boxed overhanging eaves, and exposed rafter ends in the Queen Anne style.

It was listed on the National Register of Historic Places in 1992.
