= Schrader-Griswold Cottage =

Historic cure cottage in Franklin County, New York

- U.S. National Register of Historic Places
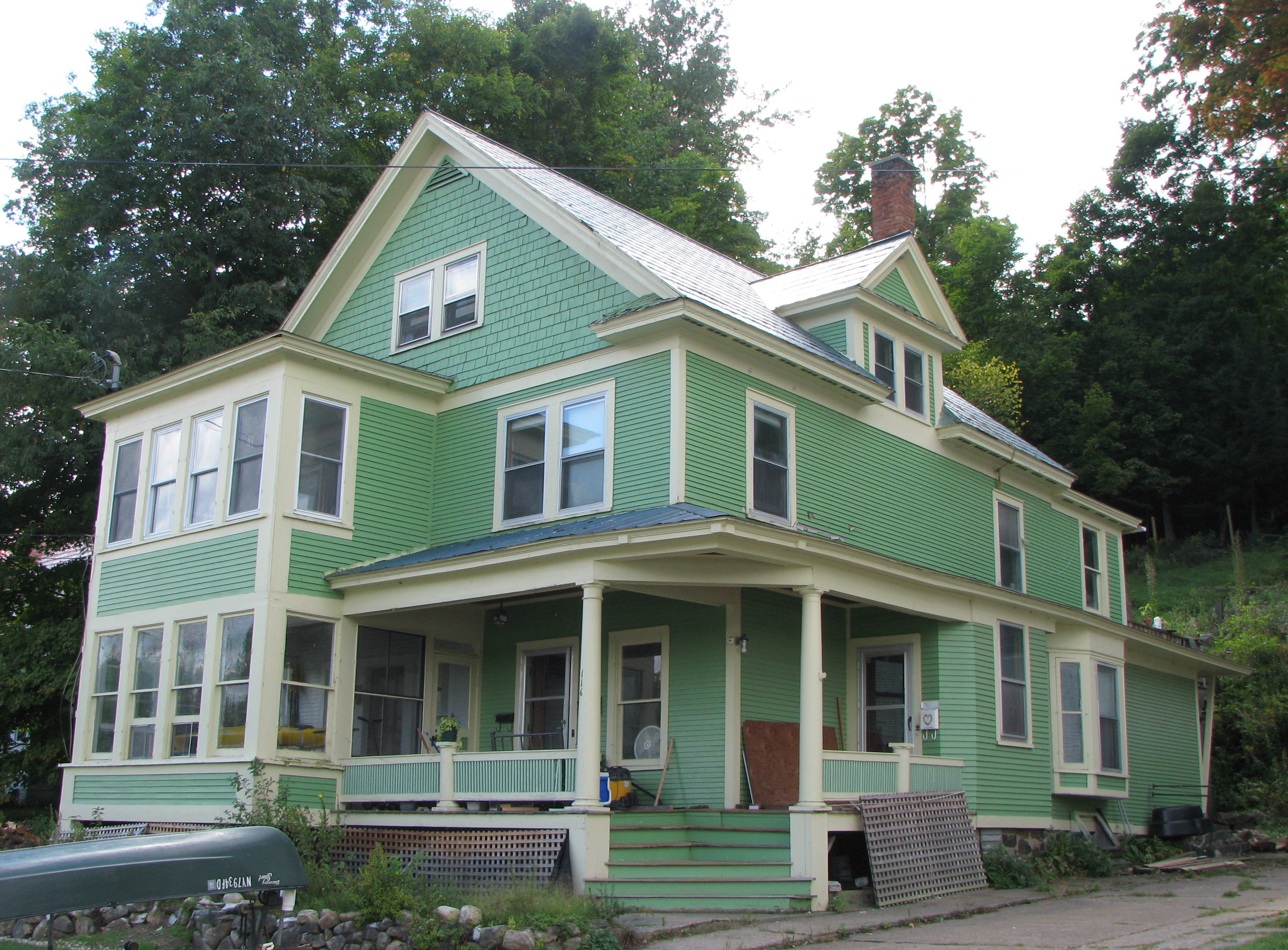
- Schrader-Griswold Cottage, September 2008

- Location within New York Location within the United States
- Location: 49 Riverside Dr., Saranac Lake, Harrietstown, New York, U.S.
- Coordinates: 44°19′18″N 74°7′41″W
- Area: less than one acre
- Built: 1905
- Architectural style: Queen Anne
- MPS: Saranac Lake MPS
- NRHP reference No.: 92001432
- Added to NRHP: November 6, 1992

Schrader-Griswold Cottage is a historic cure cottage located at Saranac Lake in the town of Harrietstown, Franklin County, New York. It was built around 1905 and is a 2 1/2-story, gable-roofed, wood frame dwelling with clapboard siding in the Queen Anne style. It features a 2-story cure porch on half of the front facade and a 1-story verandah continuing across front and around the side.

It was listed on the National Register of Historic Places in 1992.
