= Magill Cottage =

Historic house in New York, United States

- U.S. National Register of Historic Places
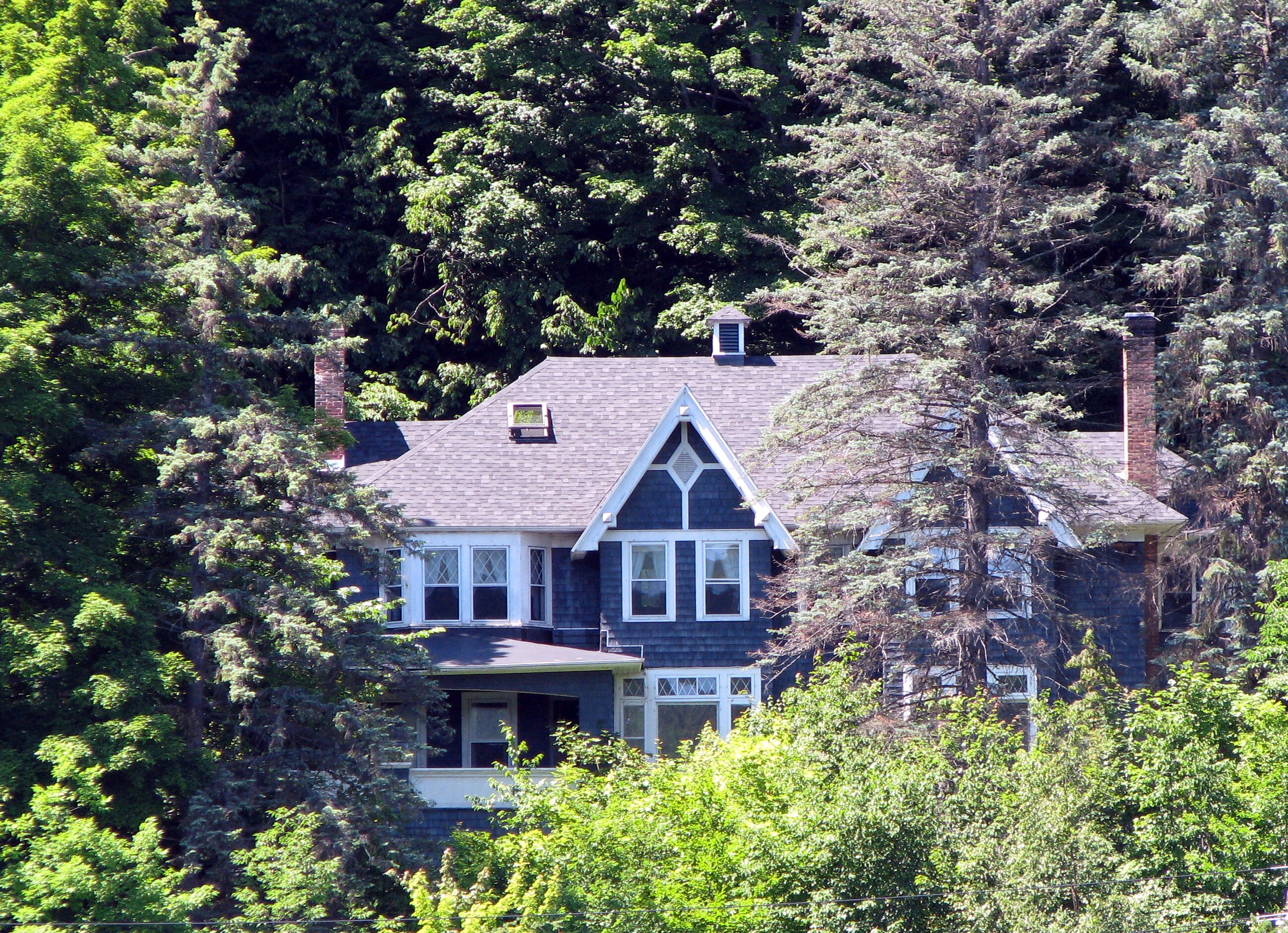
- Magill Cottage, September 2008

- Location within New York Location within the United States
- Location: 37 Riverside Dr., Saranac Lake, Harrietstown, New York, U.S.
- Coordinates: 44°19′12″N 74°7′39″W
- Area: less than one acre
- Built: 1911
- Architect: Woodruff, Benjamin; Woodruff, Lynn
- Architectural style: Stick/Eastlake
- MPS: Saranac Lake MPS
- NRHP reference No.: 92001430
- Added to NRHP: November 6, 1992

Magill Cottage is a historic cure cottage located at Saranac Lake in the town of Harrietstown, Franklin County, New York. It was built about 1911 and is a 2 1/2-story, wood-frame structure on a concrete foundation. It is topped by a hipped roof with two steeply pitched cross gable extensions in the Queen Anne style. It has a large 1-story porch and two second-story sleeping porches. It operated as a private sanatorium until 1926.

It was listed on the National Register of Historic Places in 1992.
