= Drury Cottage =

Historic house in New York, United States

- U.S. National Register of Historic Places
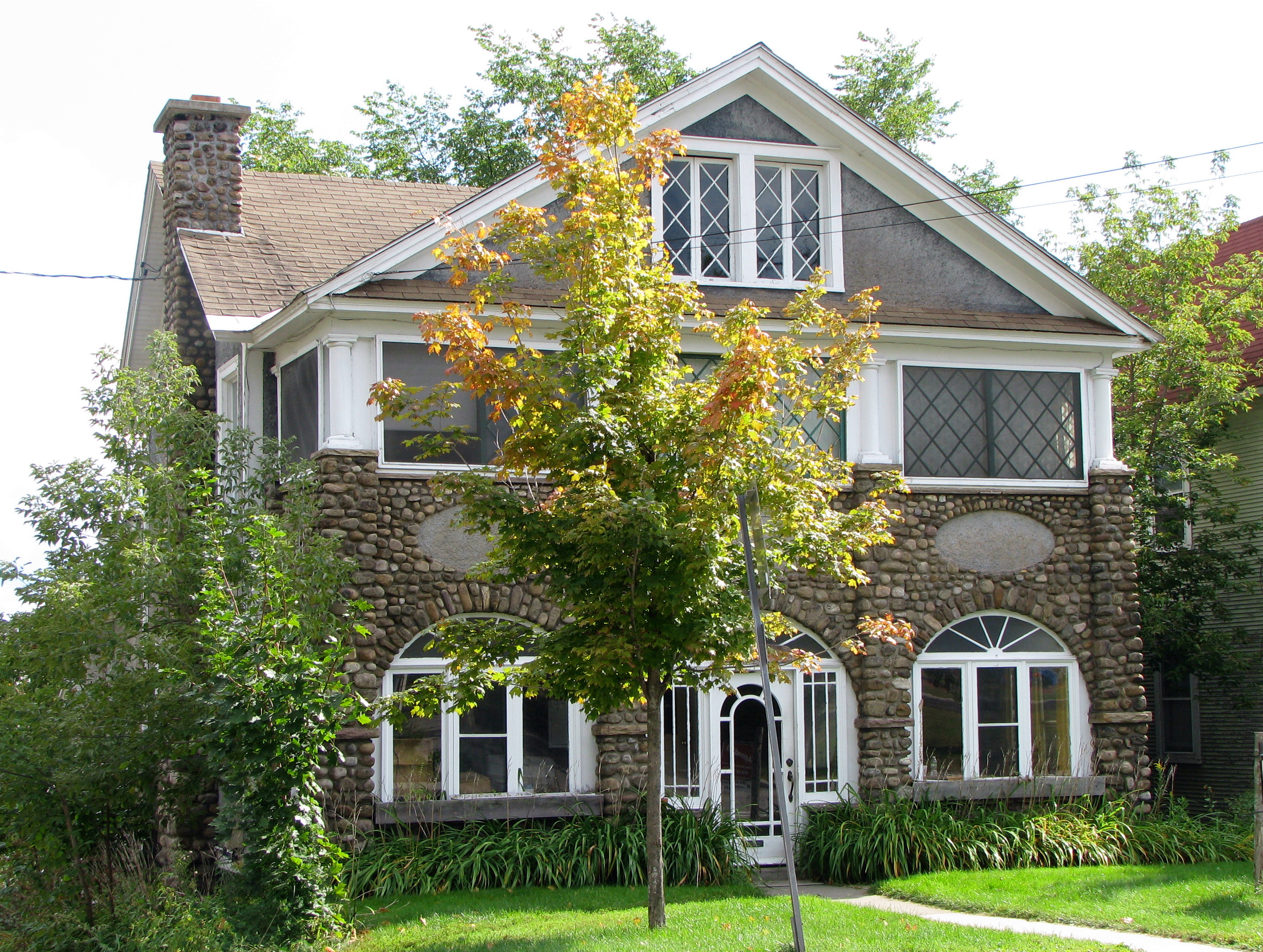
- Drury Cottage, September 2008

- Location within New York Location within the United States
- Location: 29 Bloomingdale Ave., Saranac Lake, Harrietstown, New York, U.S.
- Coordinates: 44°19′46″N 74°7′52″W
- Area: less than one acre
- Built: 1910
- Architectural style: Bungalow/Craftsman
- MPS: Saranac Lake MPS
- NRHP reference No.: 92001450
- Added to NRHP: November 6, 1992

Drury Cottage is a historic cure cottage located at Saranac Lake in the town of Harrietstown, Franklin County, New York. It was built in 1910 and is a 2 1/2-story, frame dwelling set atop a cut stone foundation and surmounted by a gable roof clad in asphalt shingles. The front facade is dominated by a 2-story, three-bay cobblestone porch.

It was listed on the National Register of Historic Places in 1992.
