= Baird Cottage =

Historic house in New York, United States

- U.S. National Register of Historic Places
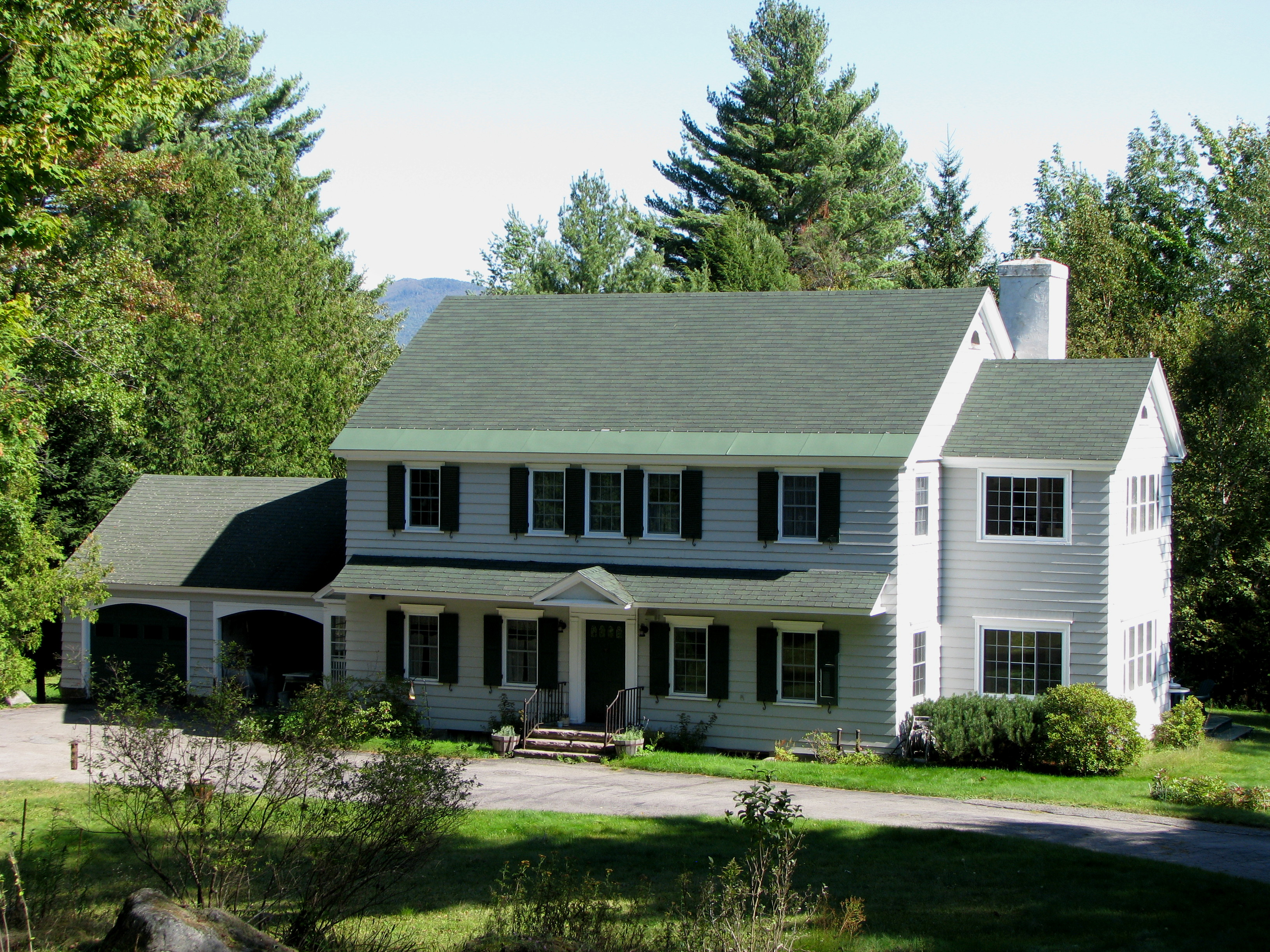
- Baird Cottage, September 2008

- Location within New York Location within the United States
- Location: Glenwood Rd., Saranac Lake, Harrietstown, New York, U.S.
- Coordinates: 44°18′53″N 74°8′5″W
- Area: 1.5 acres (0.61 ha)
- Built: 1930
- Architectural style: Colonial Revival
- MPS: Saranac Lake MPS
- NRHP reference No.: 92001466
- Added to NRHP: November 6, 1992

Baird Cottage is a historic cure cottage located at Saranac Lake in the town of Harrietstown, Franklin County, New York. It was built in 1930 and is a two-story, side-gabled Colonial Revival style house based on a rectangular floor plan with a two-story end porch. It sits on a concrete foundation and is sided in clapboard and asphalt shingles.

It was listed on the National Register of Historic Places in 1992.
