= Sloan Cottage =

Historic house in New York, United States

- U.S. National Register of Historic Places
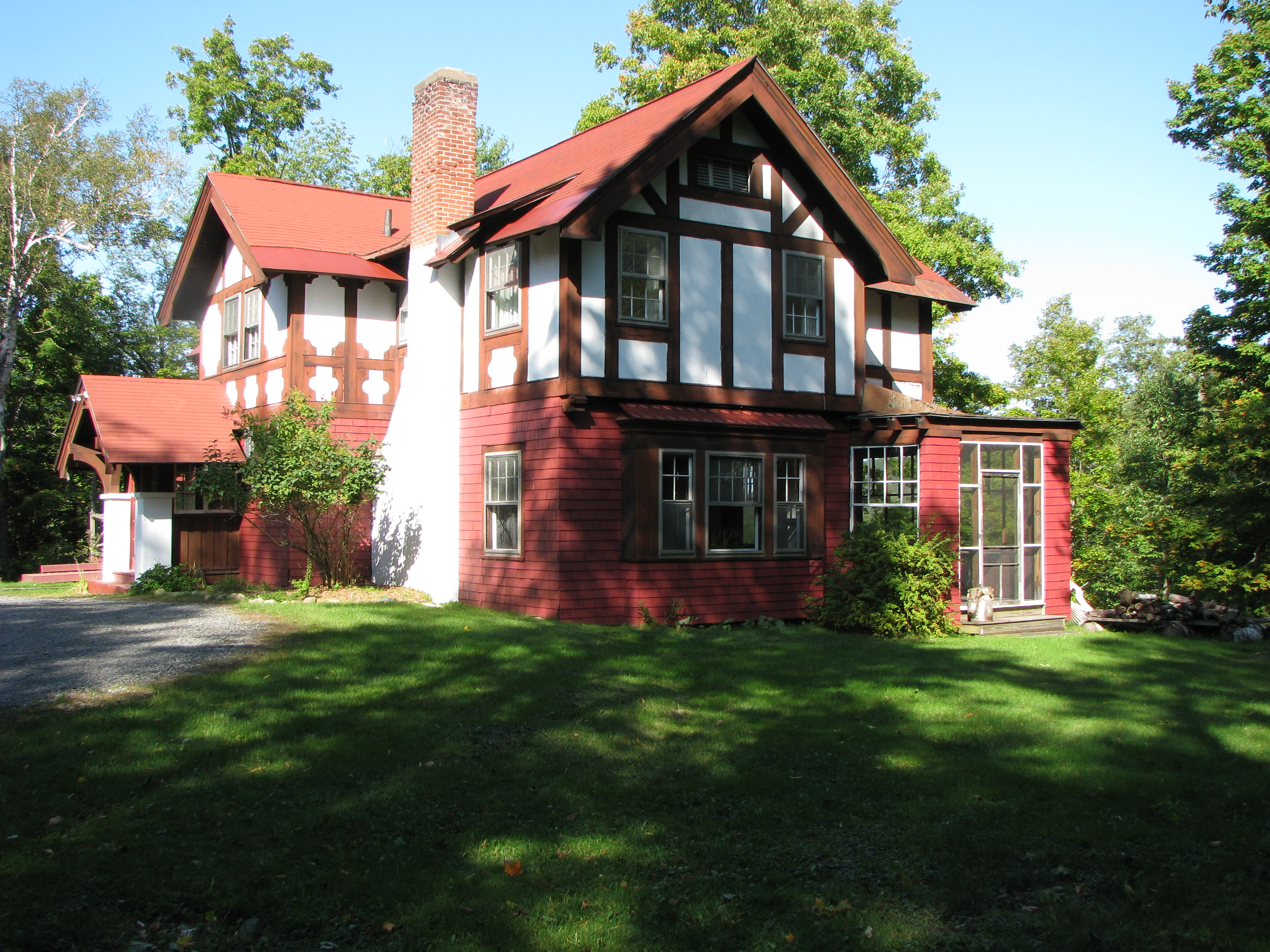
- Sloan Cottage, September 2008

- Location within New York Location within the United States
- Location: 21 View St., Saranac Lake, Harrietstown, New York, U.S.
- Coordinates: 44°19′20″N 74°8′9″W
- Area: 18 acres (7.3 ha)
- Built: 1907
- Architect: Coulter & Westoff
- Architectural style: Tudor Revival, Shingle Style
- MPS: Saranac Lake MPS
- NRHP reference No.: 92001442
- Added to NRHP: November 6, 1992

Sloan Cottage is a historic cure cottage located at Saranac Lake in the town of Harrietstown, Franklin County, New York. It was built about 1907 and is a two-story, wood-frame dwelling sided in plain wood shingles with half-timbering above, with an irregular gable roofline in the Shingle Style. It features a sleeping porch and first floor sitting-out porch.

It was listed on the National Register of Historic Places in 1992.
