= Upper St. Regis, New York =

- hamlet
- Location of Upper St. Regis in New York
- Coordinates: 44°23′49″N 74°16′04″W
- Country: United States
- State: New York
- County: Franklin
- Town: Harrietstown

Upper St. Regis is a small hamlet on New York State Route 30 near Upper St. Regis Lake, 3 miles (5 km) south of Paul Smiths in Franklin County, New York, United States.

Camp Wild Air was listed on the National Register of Historic Places in 1986.
