= Cure cottages of Saranac Lake =

Tuberculosis treatment centers in Upstate New York

- Trudeau Sanatorium
- U.S. National Register of Historic Places
- U.S. Historic district
- Location within New York Location within the United States
- Nearest city: Saranac Lake, New York
- Area: 66 acres (27 ha)
- Architect: Multiple, including W. L. Coulter
- Architectural style: Late Victorian, Late 19th And 20th Century Revivals
- MPS: Saranac Lake MPS
- NRHP reference No.: 95000479
- Added to NRHP: April 20, 1995

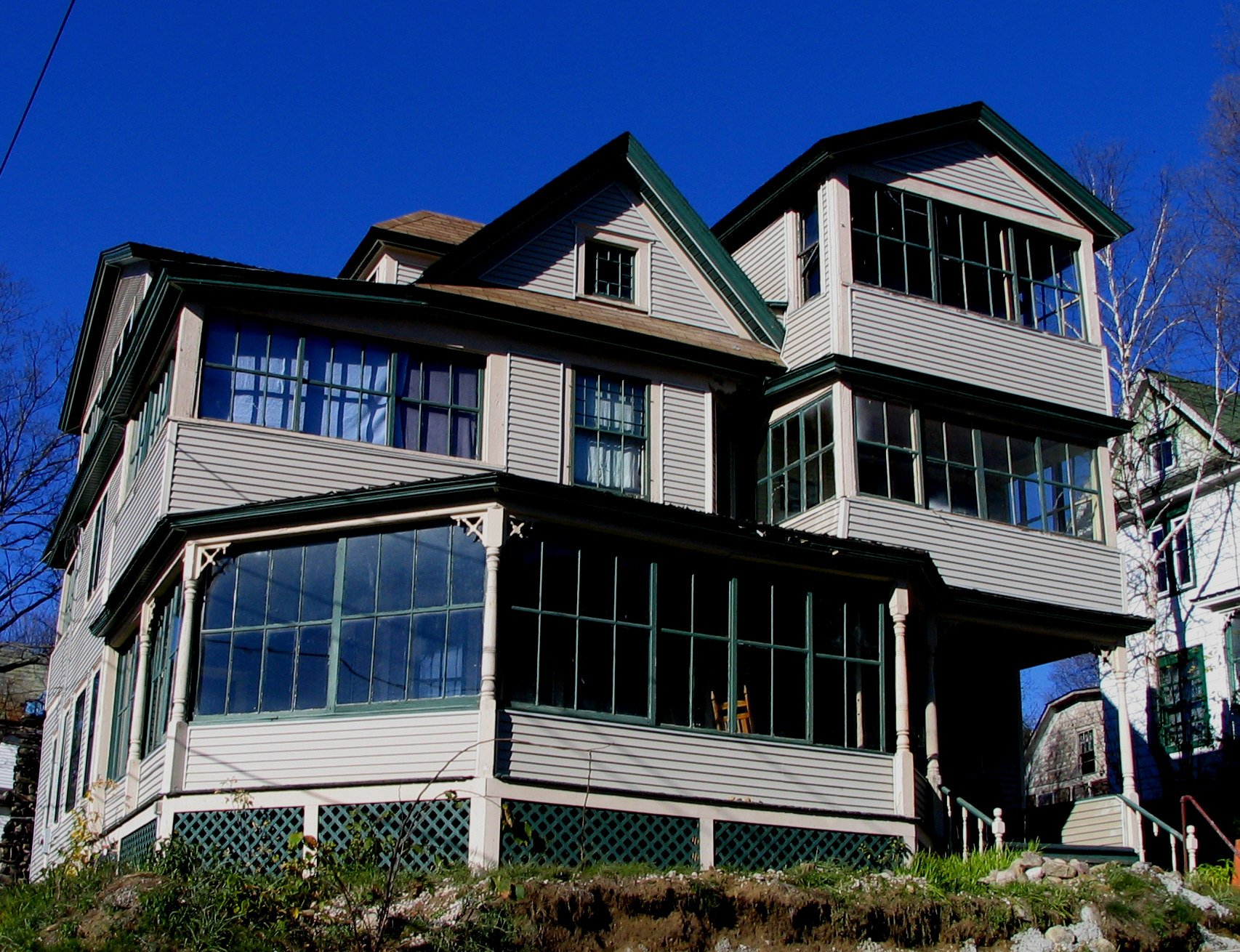
The Noyes Cottage at 16 Helen Street is a classic example of a house that evolved from a single-family house to a private sanatorium.

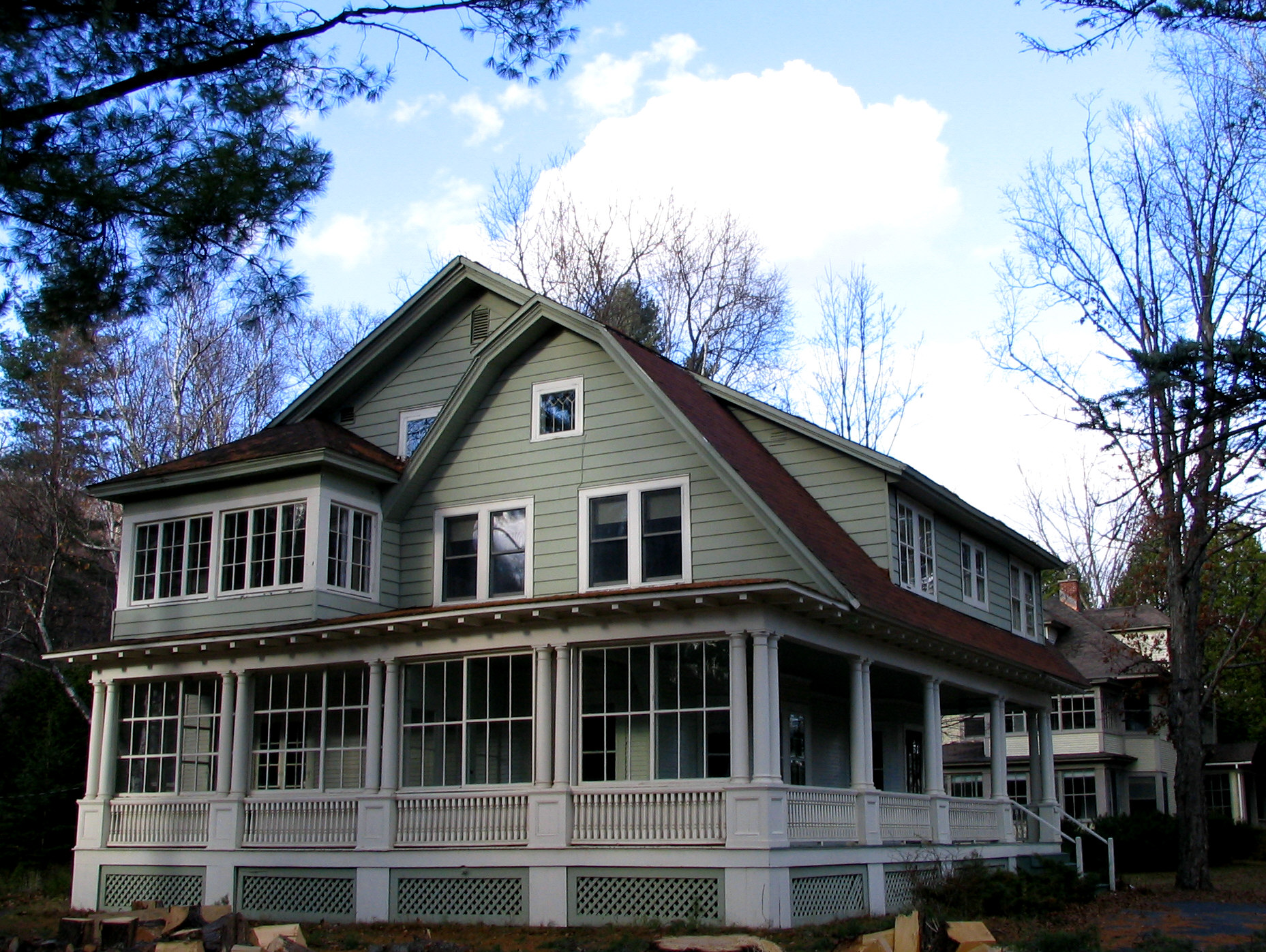
A cure cottage in the Highland Park Historic District on Park Avenue

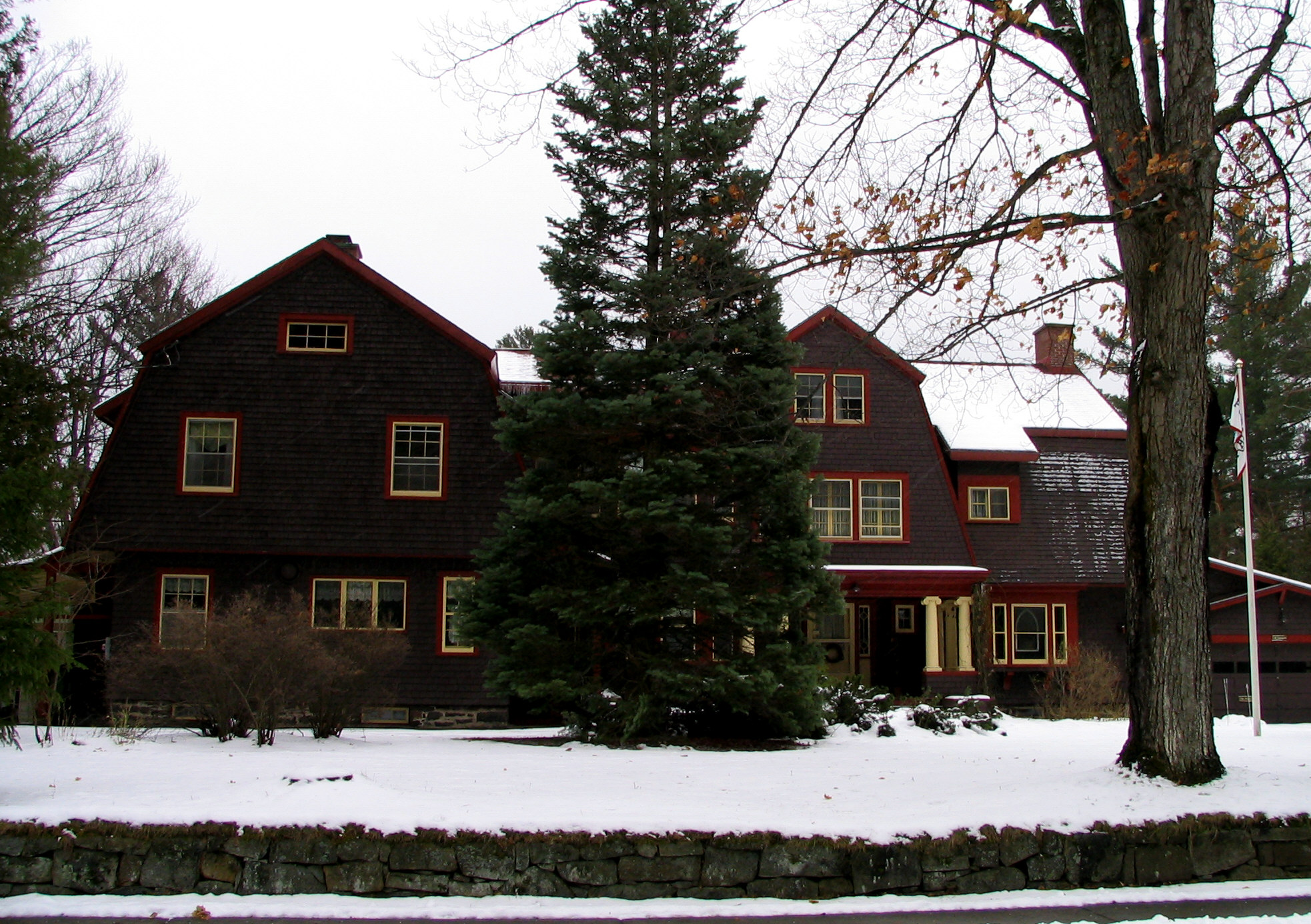
147 Park Avenue, called "The Porcupine" because it had so many good points. The "Cure Porches" are on the other side of the house. Presently a Bed and Breakfast.

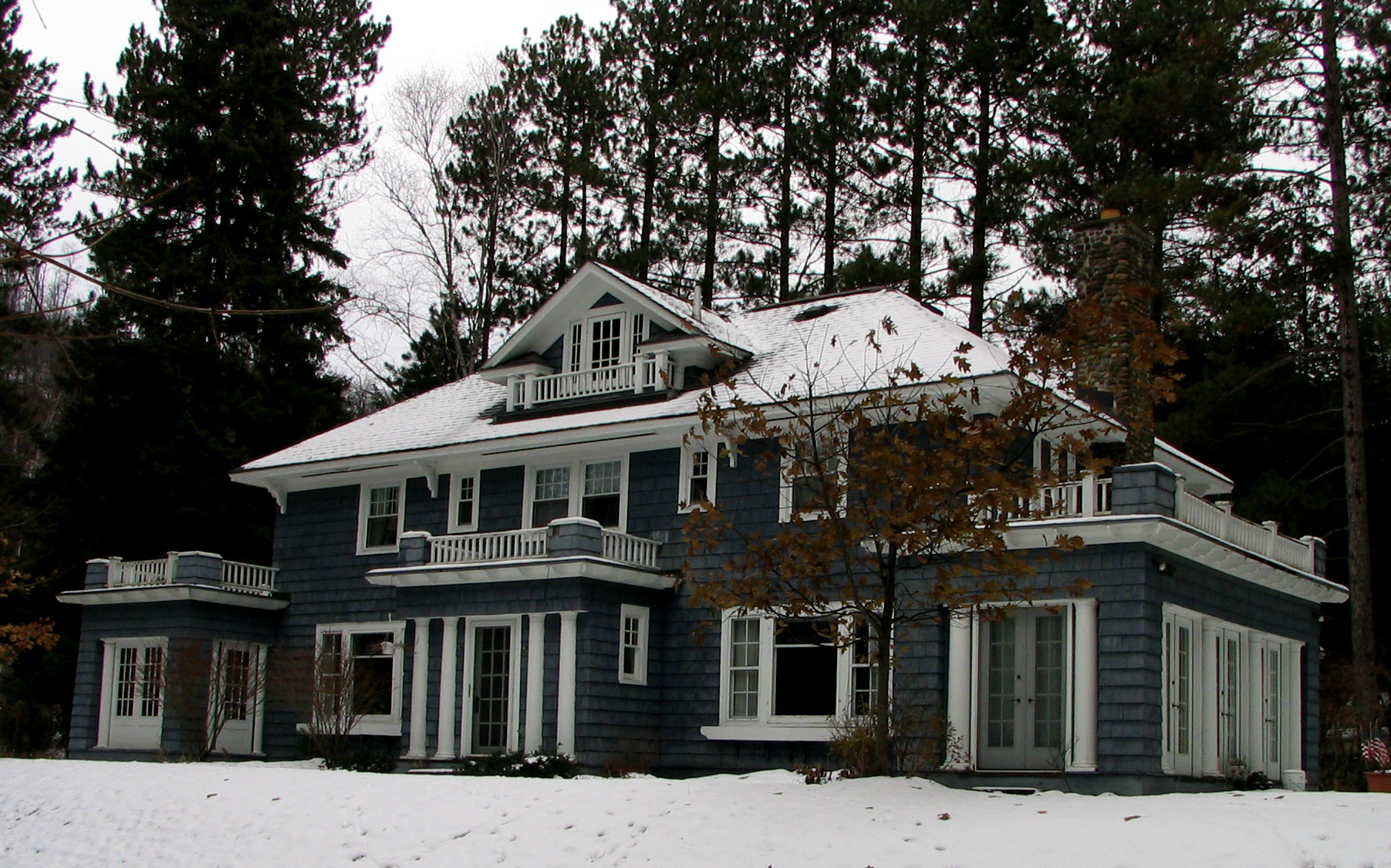
The Christy Mathewson Cottage, 138 Park Avenue in Highland Park. Mathewson was one of the greatest baseball pitchers of his day.

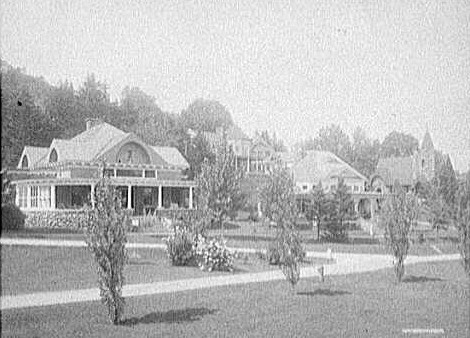
Chapel and cottages at the Adirondack Cottage Sanitarium, 1906

Between 1873 and 1945, Saranac Lake, New York, became a world-renowned center for the treatment of tuberculosis, using a treatment that involved exposing patients to as much fresh air as possible under conditions of complete bed-rest. In the process, a specific building type, the "cure cottage", developed, built by residents seeking to capitalize on the town's fame, by physicians, and often by the patients themselves. Many of these structures are extant, and their historic value has been recognized by listing on the National Register of Historic Places.

== Beginnings ==
Dr. Edward Livingston Trudeau (1848–1915), as a young man, watched his elder brother die of tuberculosis over a period of three months– at the time, the disease was incurable. He subsequently trained as a doctor, and, three years after completing his studies, was himself diagnosed with tuberculosis. Conventional thinking of the time called for a change of climate, and he went to live in the Adirondack Mountains, initially at Paul Smith's Hotel, spending as much time as possible in the open, and he subsequently regained his health. In 1876 he moved to Saranac Lake and established a medical practice among the sportsmen, guides and lumber camps of the region. In 1882, Trudeau read about Prussian Dr. Hermann Brehmer's success treating tuberculosis with the "rest cure" in cold, clear mountain air. Following this example, Trudeau founded the Adirondack Cottage Sanitarium in February, 1885. The first patients were two sisters who had been factory workers in New York City. They were treated in a one-room cottage named "Little Red", built for $350 on land donated by the guides and residents of the village. As the sanitorium grew, it would be supported at first by wealthy sportsmen that Trudeau had met at Paul Smith's, several of whom had built great camps on the nearby St. Regis Lakes.

The requirement for fresh air lead Trudeau to avoid large institutional settings, feeling that a cottage-like structure would maximize the patient's exposure to light and air, and avoid the sanitation difficulties of a large institutional setting. Consequently, as the town's increasing fame drew more and more invalids, "cure cottages" began to spring up throughout the town. Many were created by simply adding glassed-in porches to existing houses. Others were built as cure cottages and/or apartment buildings, but all had "cure porches" with sliding glass windows, in which patients spent at least eight hours a day resting on special day beds or reclining chairs.

== Growth ==
In 1887, when Robert Louis Stevenson came to Saranac Lake for treatment of what was then thought to be tuberculosis and stayed at what is now known as Stevenson Cottage, the town's fame grew substantially, and the arrival of the railroads, the New York Central and the Delaware and Hudson, in the village greatly eased access to the area. The discovery that tuberculosis was contagious further contributed to Saranac Lake's importance as a cure center, as many other venues in the Adirondacks began to turn "consumptives" away. As a result, the village grew rapidly, from 533 in 1880 to 1582 in 1890 to a peak of more than 6,000 by 1920.

Many who came to take the cure brought talents that were put to good use in the small town. William L. Coulter, for example, was an architect who found work designing cottages for wealthy clients, often to be used as cure cottages. He designed a house at 147 Park Avenue for Thomas Bailey Aldrich editor of the Atlantic Monthly in 1903 that wits dubbed "The Porcupine" because it had so many fine points. He also designed Camp Eagle Island and Prospect Point Camp, two Great Camps on Upper Saranac Lake.

A number of different types of institutions developed: boarding houses and cottages, for relatively ambulatory patients; cottages that didn't provide board, in which case meals would be provided by a nearby boarding cottage; "nursing cottages" for patients too weak to get around. In time, cottages came to specialize in distinct populations: there were cottages for Greeks, for Cubans, for blacks, and kosher boarding cottages for Jews. Some were organized by occupation: there were cottages that catered to circus people, for telephone workers, for the employees of the DuPont company, and for Endicott Johnson Shoes. The National Vaudeville Artists built the National Vaudeville Artists Hospital, which later became the Will Rogers Memorial Hospital, now a senior independent living community, Saranac Village at Will Rogers.

For those who could afford it, the best situation for a patient was to be able to live with one's own family. For these, a number of possibilities existed, ranging from a small cottage that could house the entire family, to large and luxurious houses built to accommodate the family and whatever patients might be part of it. One of the latter type was built for a Swiss baron for his invalid daughter, another by the founder of Stanley Tools. Those of lesser means frequently brought family members who earned a living by working in other sanatoria, or creating their own cure settings in rented accommodations.

== During the World Wars ==
World War I caused another major increase in patients— the stress of war and the damage caused by mustard gas provided fertile ground for the tuberculosis bacillus. By 1921 there were 650 veterans living in Saranac Lake; later, the Veterans Administration opened Sunmount Veterans Hospital in nearby Tupper Lake.

When Norway was overrun by the Nazis early in World War II, many Norwegian merchant seamen who were at sea at the time chose to come to the United States; some of those were found to have tuberculosis, and perhaps as many as 500 came to live in Saranac Lake. They nearly all left after the war, but 16 had died, and are buried in a special section of Pine Ridge Cemetery; their graves are tended by prisoners at nearby Camp Gabriels, funded by an annual payment from the Norwegian government.

== New treatments and cottage reuse ==
In 1944, an effective drug, streptomycin, was developed, and by the mid-1950s, sanatorium treatment of tuberculosis was nearly entirely supplanted by drug treatment, although the New York state-operated tuberculosis sanatorium in nearby Ray Brook (started in 1904) was not closed until the mid-1960s. Many of the cure cottages were converted into apartment houses, and some were torn down; some have been lovingly restored, and some badly renovated.

== Notable residents ==
- Thomas Bailey Aldrich
- Adelaide Crapsey
- Christy Mathewson
- William Morris
- Manuel L. Quezon
- Walker Percy

== National Register of Historic Places sites ==
Sixty-four of the hundreds of cure cottages still extant in Saranac Lake have been placed on the National Register of Historic Places. Still more are included in seven historic districts in the village.

Landmark name	Image	Location	Town	Summary
Adirondack Cottage Sanitarium		Trudeau Rd. 44°20′31″N 74°7′21″W	St. Armand	A tuberculosis sanitorium established in 1882 by Dr. Edward Livingston Trudeau, later called the Trudeau Sanitorium.
Dr. A. H. Allen Cottage		11 Woodycrest Road; 44°19′53″N 74°7′47″W	Harrietstown	A 1909 Scopes and Feustmann-designed cure cottage.
Ames Cottage		19 Church Street; 44°19′29″N 74°7′40″W	Harrietstown	A Queen Anne style cure cottage built about 1906.
Baird Cottage		Glenwood Rd. 44°18′53″N 74°8′5″W	Harrietstown	A virtually intact cure cottage built in 1930, near the end of the cure cottage era.
Barngalow		40 Cliff Road; 44°20′2″N 74°7′44″W	Harrietstown	A two-story cure cottage that was originally a barn, converted to residential use in 1910.
Bogie Cottage		15 Franklin Avenue; 44°19′30″N 74°7′33″W	North Elba	A 1908, American Craftsman-inspired cure cottage
Camp Intermission		Northwest Bay Rd. 44°20′55″N 74°08′56″W	Harrietstown	A Great Camp built for theatrical agent William Morris, designed by William G. Distin
Peyton Clark Cottage		36 Rockledge Rd. 44°19′48″N 74°7′21″W	St. Armand	A 1915 large, Tudor-style, 2 1/2-story cure cottage designed by William H. Scopes. The owner was a civil engineer whose wife had tuberculosis.
Church Street Historic District		Roughly, Church St. from Main St. to St. Bernard St. 44°19′35″N 74°7′47″W	Harrietstown	Twenty-seven buildings including three churches, a medical laboratory, ten homes, two libraries, six cure cottages, most built between the late 1870s and 1900.
Colbath Cottage		63 River St. 44°19′32″N 74°7′46″W	Harrietstown	A Queen Anne-style cure cottage built about 1896.
Cottage Row Historic District		Roughly, Park Ave. N side from Rosemont Ave. to Catherine St. 44°19′59″N 74°8′0″W	Harrietstown	Twenty-seven cure cottage built between 1900 and 1940.
Coulter Cottage		82 Shepard Ave. 44°19′32″N 74°7′35″W	North Elba	A 2 1/2-story cure cottage designed by William L. Coulter and built between 1897 and 1899 as his residence.
Cure Cottage at 43 Forest Hill Avenue		43 Forest Hill Avenue; 44°19′47″N 74°7′23″W	Saranac Lake	A two-story cure cottage built about 1912.
Denny Cottage		141 Bloomingdale Ave. 44°20′24″N 74°7′38″W	St. Armand	A cure cottage built about 1910.
Distin Cottage		186 Kiwassa Rd. 44°19′10″N 74°7′48″W	Harrietstown	A cure cottage designed by architect William G. Distin for his father, photographer William L. Distin, built between 1915 and 1925.
Drury Cottage		52 Bloomingdale Ave. 44°19′46″N 74°7′52″W	Harrietstown	A cure cottage built c. 1912.
Ellenberger Cottage		212 Broadway; 44°19′55″N 74°8′16″W	Harrietstown	A Queen Anne style cure cottage built before 1917.
Fallon Cottage Annex		83 Franklin St. 44°19′36″N 74°7′34″W	North Elba	A 1901 cure cottage.
Feisthamel-Edelberg Cottage		203 Neil St. 44°19′44″N 74°8′11″W	Harrietstown	An intact cure cottage built before 1915.
Feustmann Cottage		83 Catherine St. 44°19′58″N 74°7′50″W	Harrietstown	A private cure cottage designed by architect Maurice Feustmann for use by his own family.
Freer Cottage		267 Kiwassa St. 44°19′3″N 74°7′54″W	Harrietstown	A largely intact private cure cottage built before 1925
E. L. Gray House		27 Helen St. 44°19′34″N 74°7′41″W	Harrietstown	A cure cottage designed by Scopes and Feustmann, built between 1911 and 1913.
Hathaway Cottage		168 Charles St. 44°19′50″N 74°8′18″W	Harrietstown	A largely intact American Craftsman cure cottage built about 1900.
Highland Park Historic District		Roughly, Park Ave. from Military Rd. to 170 Park Ave. 44°20′10″N 74°7′32″W	St. Armand	Seventeen private, single-family homes built between 1896 and 1930; most include cure cottage features.
Helen Hill Historic District		Prescott Place, Helen & Front Sts., Sheppard, Franklin & Clinton Aves. 44°19′30″N 74°4′40″W	St. Armand	Includes nine previously listed cure cottages.
Hill Cottage		76 Franklin Ave. 44°19′36″N 74°7′32″W	North Elba	A 1913 Craftsman-style cure cottage.
Hillside Lodge		Harrietstown Rd. 44°21′18″N 74°8′47″W	Harrietstown	An intact cure cottage built about 1920.
The Homestead		17 Maple Hill; 44°19′24″N 74°7′55″W	Harrietstown	A boarding cure cottage built in 1890.
Hooey Cottage		4 Prescott Pl. 44°19′41″N 74°7′38″W	Harrietstown	A 1916 cure cottage.
Hopkins Cottage		58 Birch St. 44°19′04″N 74°07′48″W	Harrietstown	A cure cottage built in 1923.
Jennings Cottage		23 Marshall St. 44°19′51″N 74°7′50″W	Harrietstown	An 1896 Bungalow-style cure cottage.
Johnson Cottage		46 St. Bernard St. 44°19′32″N 74°7′55″W	Harrietstown	A largely intact cure cottage built before 1896.
Kennedy Cottage		98 Shepard Ave. 44°19′37″N 74°7′36″W	North Elba	An 1897 cure cottage that was used by the National Vaudeville Artists Philanthropic Association prior to the construction of the Will Rogers Hospital.
Lane Cottage		5 Rockledge Rd. 44°19′47″N 74°7′22″W	North Elba	A 1923 cure cottage built by Edward Shaw for his wife, who had tuberculosis. The Shaws had two young children; fearing that they would contract TB from Mrs. Shaw, a separate house was built for them, nearby.
Larom Cottage		247 Park Ave. 44°20′2″N 74°7′42″W	Harrietstown	A cure cottage built between 1905 and 1910.
Larom-Welles Cottage		50 Cliff Road; 44°20′2″N 74°7′45″W	Harrietstown	A 1905, three-story, wood-frame cure cottage, built for the priest of St. Luke's Episcopal Church, later the home of Dr. Edward Welles, a pioneer in thoracic surgery, who practiced at the Adirondack Cottage Sanatorium.
Dr. Henry Leetch House		12 Labrador Lane; 44°19′35″N 74°7′14″W	North Elba	A 1932 cure cottage designed by William L. Distin for Dr. Henry Leetch, who specialized in treating tuberculosis, and who had the disease himself.
Leis Block		12 Bloomingdale Ave. 44°19′44″N 74°7′59″W	Harrietstown	A 1902 commercial building with apartments built with "cure porches", it originally housed Henry P. Leis pianos and a pharmacy on its first floor. The pharmacy at one time was named Terminal Pharmacy due to the fact that it was the bus stop. Later it was renamed Hoffman Pharmacy.
Leis Cottage		401 State Route 3; 44°19′14″N 74°8′59″W	Harrietstown	A private, shingled cure cottage built about 1906.
Lent Cottage		108 Franklin Ave. 44°19′43″N 74°7′33″W	North Elba	An apartment house, built about 1920 as a cure cottage
Little Red		154Algonquin Ave. 44°19′6″N 74°9′29″W	Harrietstown	The original cure cottage of the Adirondack Cottage Sanitorium founded by Dr. Edward Livingston Trudeau.
Magill Cottage		74 Kiwassa Road; 44°19′12″N 74°7′39″W	Harrietstown	A cure cottage built about 1911.
Marquay Cottage		67 Slater St. 44°19′18″N 74°7′20″W	North Elba	A 1914, Queen Anne-style cure cottage built of rusticated cast-concrete blocks, with an octagonal corner tower.
Marvin Cottage		113 Franklin St. 44°19′43″N 74°7′36″W	North Elba	A cure cottage built about 1900.
McBean Cottage		192 Park Ave. 44°19′57″N 74°7′51″W	Harrietstown	A Colonial Revival cure cottage with Craftsman-style touches, built between 1915 and 1925.
Morgan Cottage		211 Park Ave. 44°19′58″N 74°7′48″W	Harrietstown	A 1915 bungalow designed by Scopes and Feustmann as a cure cottage.
Musselman Cottage		60 Kiwassa Road; 44°19′20″N 74°7′46″W	Harrietstown	A boardinghouse-style cure cottage built about 1907.
Noyes Cottage	The Noyes Cottage at 16 Helen Street, Saranac Lake	35 Helen St. 44°19′37″N 74°7′40″W	Harrietstown	A cure cottage built in 1898.
Partridge Cottage		30 Clinton Avenue; 44°19′27″N 74°07′27″W	North Elba	A 1925 Colonial Revival apartment house, with three apartments used as a cure cottages for three families.
Pittenger Cottage		494 Forest Hill Ave. 44°19′43″N 74°7′19″W	North Elba	A cure cottage with five cure porches, built about 1920.
Pomeroy Cottage		55 Baker St. 44°20′01″N 74°7′55″W	Harrietstown	A built about 1910, it may have been designed as a private cure cottage by William G. Distin.
Radwell Cottage		178 Charles St. 44°19′50″N 74°8′17″W	Harrietstown	An intact 1896 cure cottage.
Ryan Cottage		29 Algonquin Ave. 44°19′6″N 74°9′10″W	Harrietstown	An 1893 Queen Anne-style cure cottage.
Sarbanes Cottage		129 Bloomingdale Ave. 44°19′51″N 74°7′40″W	Harrietstown	A cure cottage built about 1930.
Orin Savage Cottage		117 Olive St. 44°19′40″N 74°8′8″W	Harrietstown	A cure cottage built about 1910.
Schrader-Griswold Cottage		116 Kiwassa Road; 44°19′18″N 74°7′41″W	Harrietstown	A 1906 Queen Anne-style cure cottage.
Seeley Cottage		127 Olive St. 44°19′41″N 74°8′6″W	Harrietstown	An intact cure cottage built in 1890.
Sloan Cottage		31 View St. 44°19′20″N 74°8′9″W	Harrietstown	A Coulter and Westhoff-designed single-family cure cottage built in 1907.
Smith Cottage		25 Jenkins St. 44°19′4″N 74°8′23″W	Harrietstown	A cure cottage for a single patient built about 1903.
Stevenson Cottage		44 Stevenson Ln. 44°19′51″N 74°07′26″W	St. Armand	A cure cottage used by Robert Louis Stevenson in 1887.
Stonaker Cottage		92 Glenwood Drive; 44°18′57″N 74°8′7″W	Harrietstown	A private home built in 1916 for the president of Northern New York Telephone who used it as a cure cottage.
Stuckman Cottage		7 Fawn Street; 44°19′39″N 74°7′28″W	North Elba	A cure cottage built between 1897 and 1900.
Walker Cottage		134 Park Ave. 44°19′57″N 74°8′1″W	Harrietstown	A 1904 Colonial Revival-style house that evolved into a cure cottage.
Wilson Cottage		21 William St. 44°19′42″N 74°8′11″W	Harrietstown	An intact Queen Anne-style cure cottage.
Witherspoon Cottage		164 Kiwassa Rd. 44°19′12″N 74°7′46″W	Harrietstown	A boardinghouse-style cure cottage built in 1910.

== Sources ==
- National Register of Historic Places Multiple Property Documentation—"Cure Industry Resources in the Village of Saranac Lake, Essex and Franklin Co., NY", by John A. Bonafide, Mary Hotaling, and Rachel D. Bliven, 1992
- Gallos, Philip L., Cure Cottages of Saranac Lake, Historic Saranac Lake, 1985, ISBN 0-9615159-0-2.
