= Orin Savage Cottage =

Historic house in New York, United States

- U.S. National Register of Historic Places
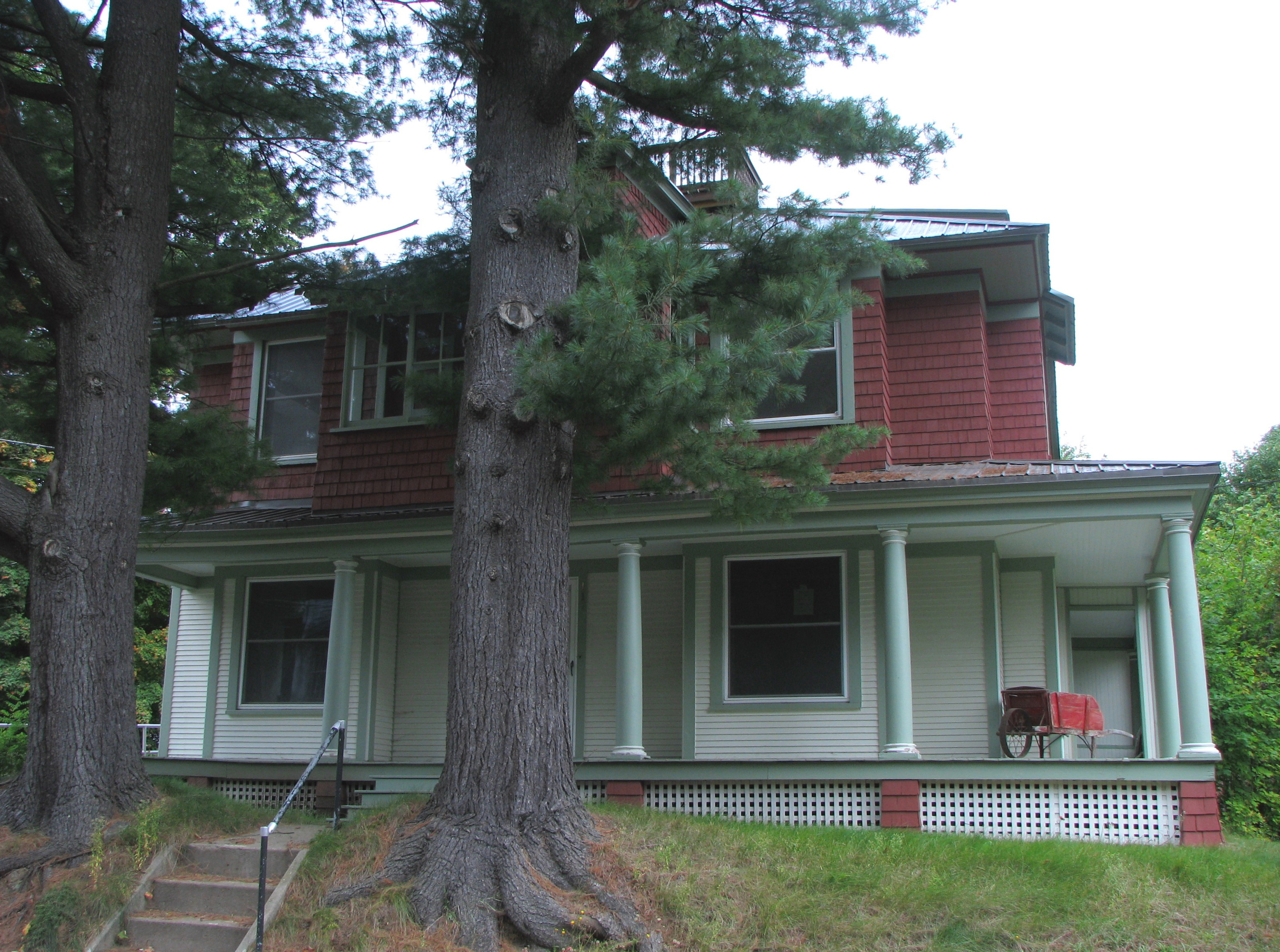
- Orin Savage Cottage, September 2008

- Location within New York Location within the United States
- Location: 33 Olive St., Saranac Lake, New York, U.S.
- Coordinates: 44°19′40″N 74°8′8″W
- Area: less than one acre
- Built: 1910
- Architect: Savage, Orin
- Architectural style: Colonial Revival
- MPS: Saranac Lake MPS
- NRHP reference No.: 92001422
- Added to NRHP: November 6, 1992

Orin Savage Cottage is a historic cure cottage located at Saranac Lake, Franklin County, New York. It was built about 1910 and is a two-story, square frame dwelling on a rubble foundation. It is topped by a hipped roof with shed roof dormers. It features a large open verandah with Doric order columns in the Colonial Revival style, two cure porches, and a sleeping porch.

It was listed on the National Register of Historic Places in 1992.
