= Partridge Cottage =

Historic house in New York, United States

- U.S. National Register of Historic Places
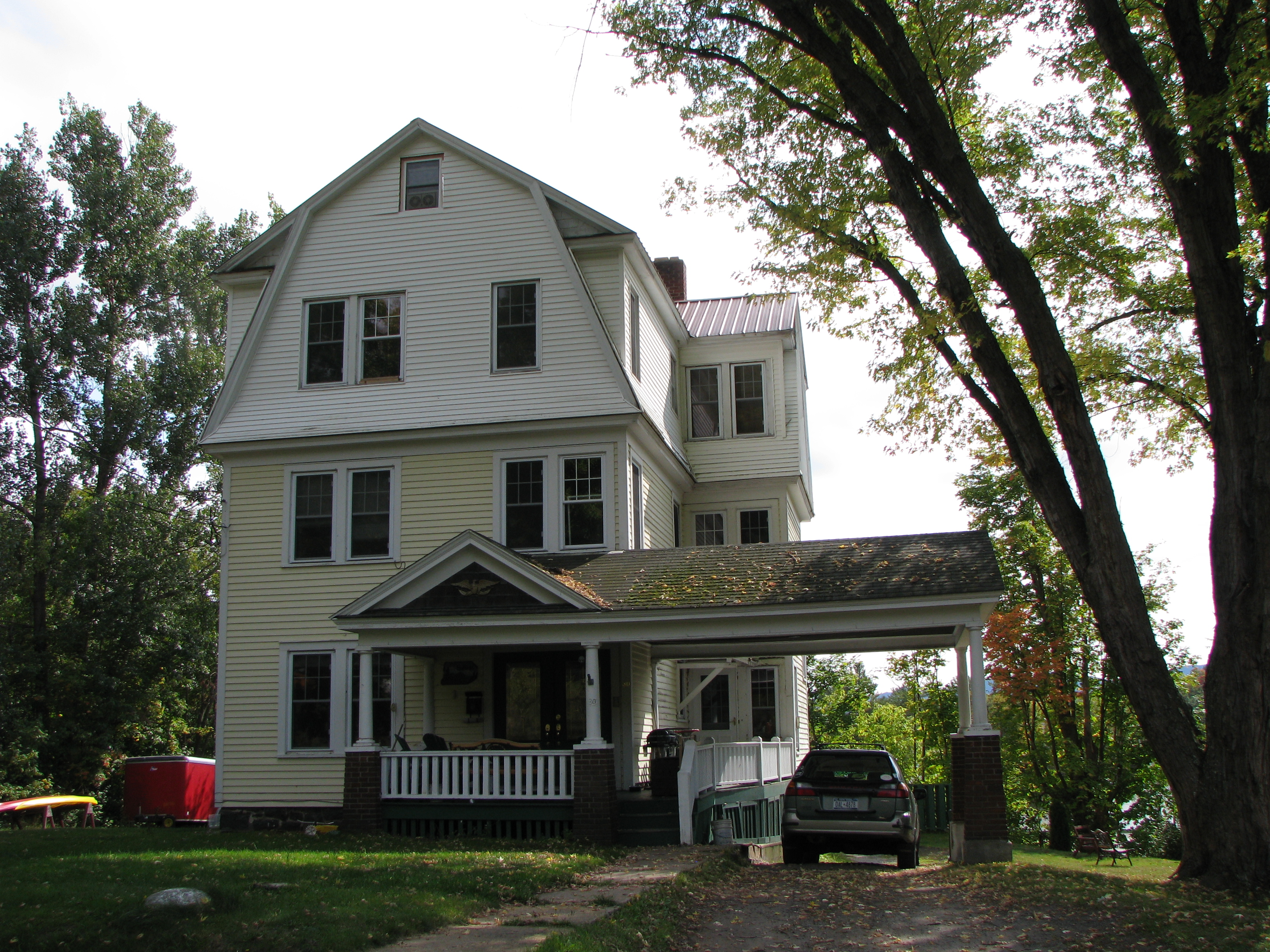
- Partridge Cottage, September 2008

- Location within New York Location within the United States
- Location: 15 South St., North Elba / Saranac Lake, New York
- Coordinates: 44°19′27″N 74°7′28″W
- Area: less than one acre
- Built: 1925
- Architectural style: Colonial Revival
- MPS: Saranac Lake MPS
- NRHP reference No.: 92001440
- Added to NRHP: November 6, 1992

Partridge Cottage is a historic apartment house and cure cottage located at Saranac Lake, town of North Elba in Essex County, New York. It was built in 1925 and is a three-story, dwelling surmounted by a metal roof with gables on all four sides. The south gable takes the form of a steeply pitched gambrel. It displays elements of the Colonial Revival style. It features a verandah that extends to a porte cochere and once had three apartments, one on each floor each with an eight feet by ten feet cure porch. Also on the property is a contributing garage. A basement apartment is believed to have been occupied by the owner.

It was listed on the National Register of Historic Places in 1992.
