= Cure Cottage at 43 Forest Hill Avenue =

Historic house in New York, United States

- U.S. National Register of Historic Places
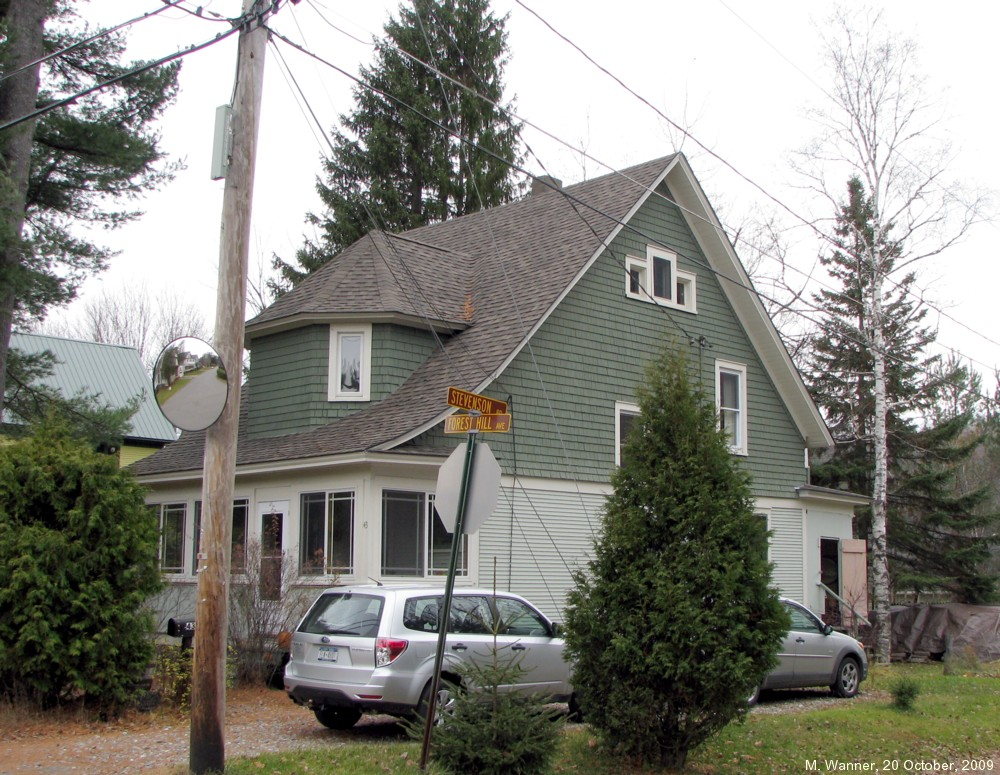
- Cure Cottage at 43 Forest Hill Avenue

- Location within New York Location within the United States
- Location: 43 Forest Hill Avenue, Saranac Lake, New York
- Coordinates: 44°19′47″N 74°07′23″W
- Area: 0.14 acres (0.057 ha)
- Built: c. 1912
- Architectural style: Late 19th and 20th century revivals
- MPS: Saranac Lake MPS
- NRHP reference No.: 12000954
- Added to NRHP: November 21, 2012

Cure Cottage at 43 Forest Hill Avenue is a historic cure cottage located at Saranac Lake, Essex County, New York. It was built about 1912, and is a two-story, wood-frame dwelling on a stone foundation. It has a steep gable roof with overhanging eaves and is sheathed in clapboard siding. It features a 11.5 ft (3.5 m) by 7.5 ft (2.3 m) second floor cure porch. It remained in use as a cure cottage until 1928.

It was added to the National Register of Historic Places in 2012.
