= Marquay Cottage =

Historic house in New York, United States

- U.S. National Register of Historic Places
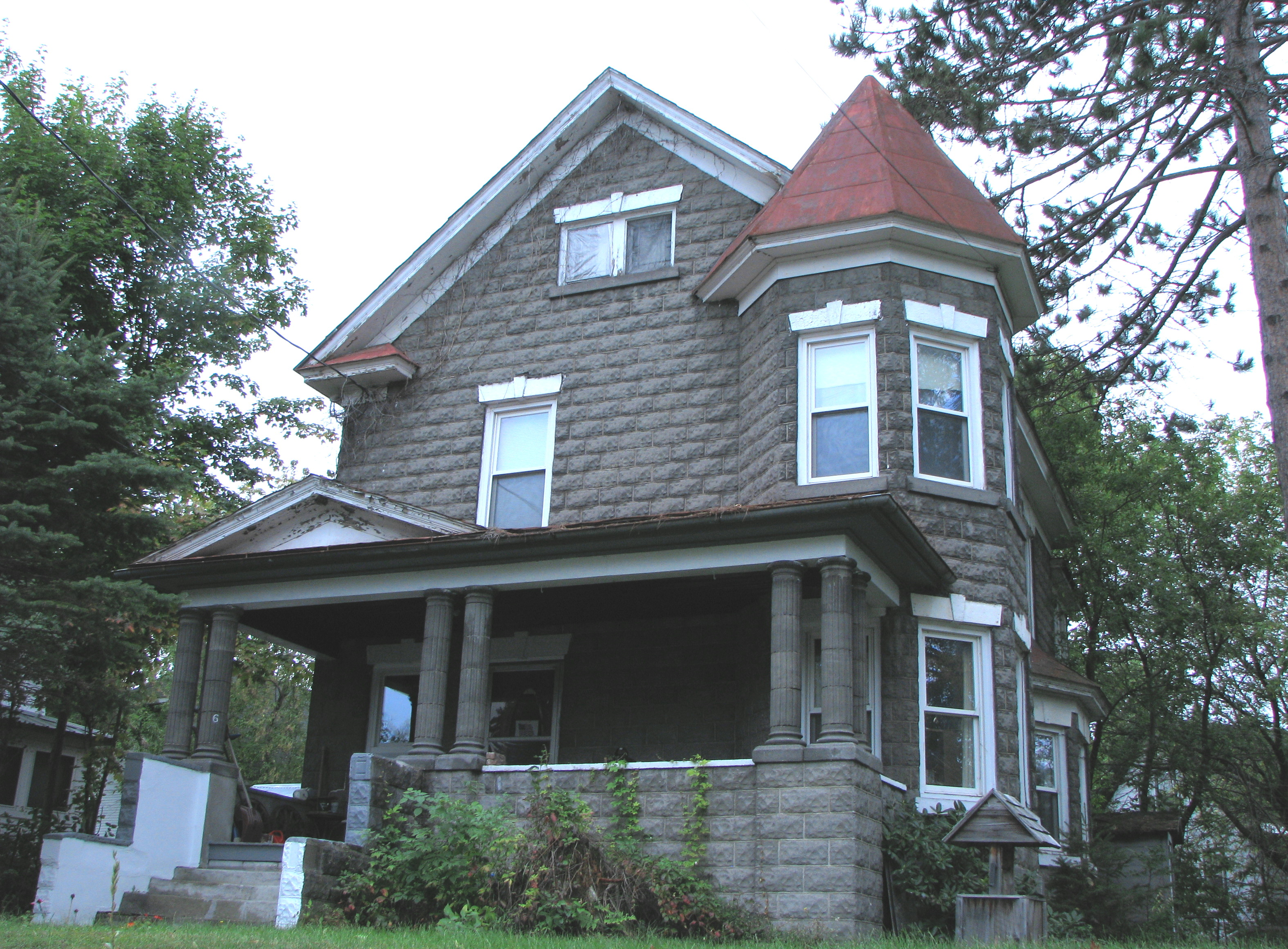
- Marquay Cottage, September 2008

- Location within New York Location within the United States
- Location: 6 Slater St., North Elba / Saranac Lake, New York
- Coordinates: 44°19′18″N 74°7′20″W
- Area: less than one acre
- Built: 1914
- Architect: Marquay, John
- Architectural style: Queen Anne
- MPS: Saranac Lake MPS
- NRHP reference No.: 92001439
- Added to NRHP: November 6, 1992

Marquay Cottage is a historic cure cottage located at Saranac Lake, town of North Elba in Essex County, New York. It was built in 1914 and is a rectangular 2 1/2-story dwelling of rusticated cast-concrete blocks with a gable roof and cross-gables. It features an octagonal corner tower with a pyramidal roof in the Queen Anne style. It has a 12-by-6-foot (3.7 by 1.8 m) cure porch.

It was listed on the National Register of Historic Places in 1992.
