= Pomeroy Cottage =

Historic house in New York, United States

- U.S. National Register of Historic Places
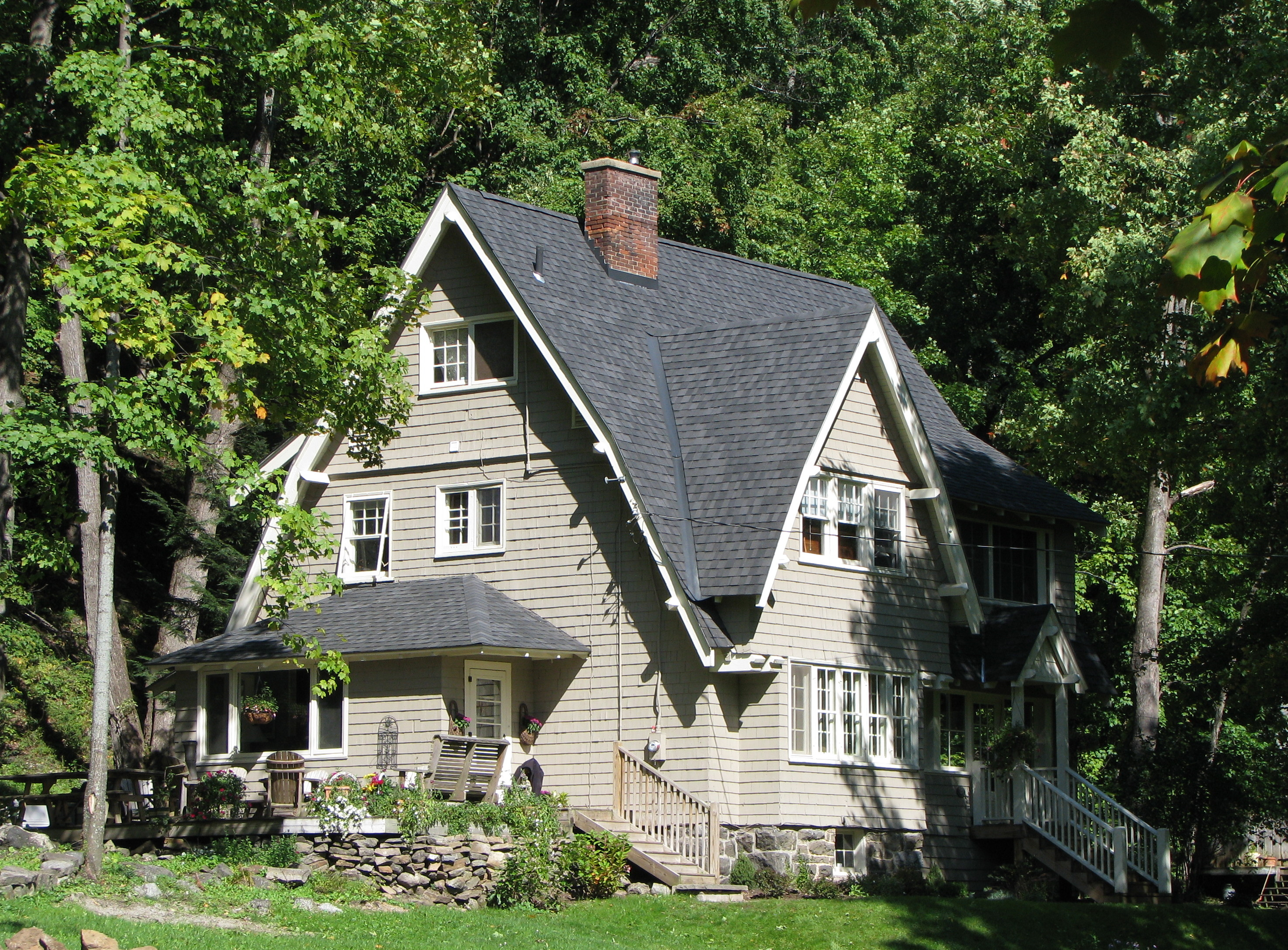
- Pomeroy Cottage, September 2008

- Location within New York Location within the United States
- Location: 26 Baker St., Saranac Lake, New York, U.S.
- Coordinates: 44°19′28″N 74°7′58″W
- Area: less than one acre
- Built: 1910
- Architectural style: Bungalow/Craftsman
- MPS: Saranac Lake MPS
- NRHP reference No.: 92001447
- Added to NRHP: November 6, 1992

Pomeroy Cottage is a historic cure cottage located at Saranac Lake, Franklin County, New York. It was built about 1910 and is a 2 1/2-story, frame dwelling square in shape and covered by a gambrel roof. It has a small 1-story addition and is covered in cedar shingles. It features a cure porch on the second story above the entrance and in a shed roof dormer.

It was listed on the National Register of Historic Places in 1992.
