= Stuckman Cottage =

Historic house in New York, United States

- U.S. National Register of Historic Places
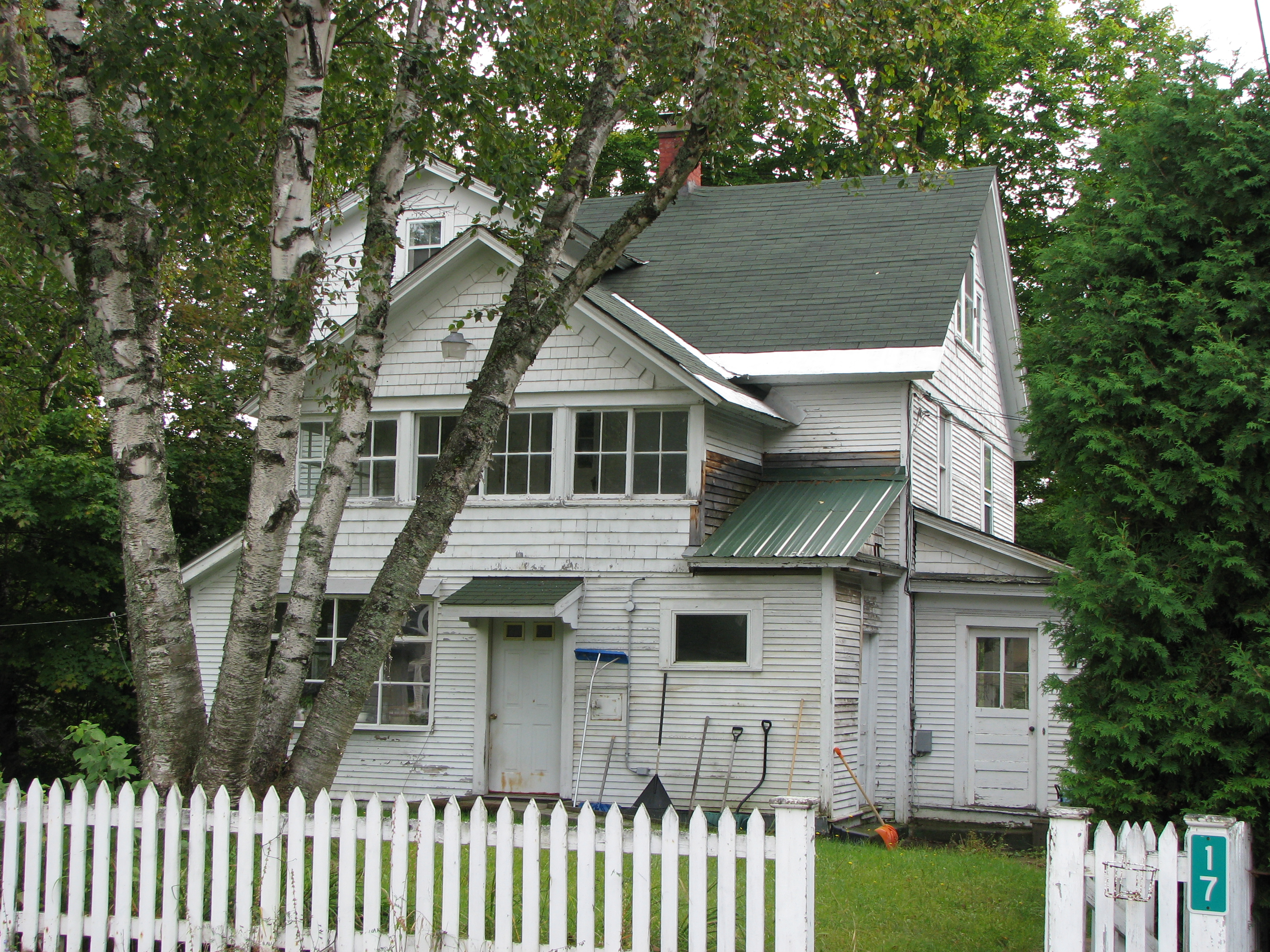
- Stuckman Cottage, September 2008

- Location within New York Location within the United States
- Location: 6 Clinton Ave., North Elba / Saranac Lake, New York
- Coordinates: 44°19′39″N 74°7′28″W
- Area: less than one acre
- Built: 1925
- Architectural style: Colonial Revival
- MPS: Saranac Lake MPS
- NRHP reference No.: 92001459
- Added to NRHP: November 6, 1992

Stuckman Cottage is a historic cure cottage located at Saranac Lake, town of North Elba in Essex and Franklin County, New York. It was built between 1897 and 1900 as a single family residence. It is a three-story, rectangular, gable-roofed wood-frame dwelling with numerous additions layered over each other over the years and has Colonial Revival style details. The interior is divided into apartments, one per floor, and it features a glass-enclosed verandah and multiple glazed cure porches. It was operated as a boarding cottage with care starting in 1925.

It was listed on the National Register of Historic Places in 1992.
