= Freer Cottage =

Historic house in New York, United States

- U.S. National Register of Historic Places
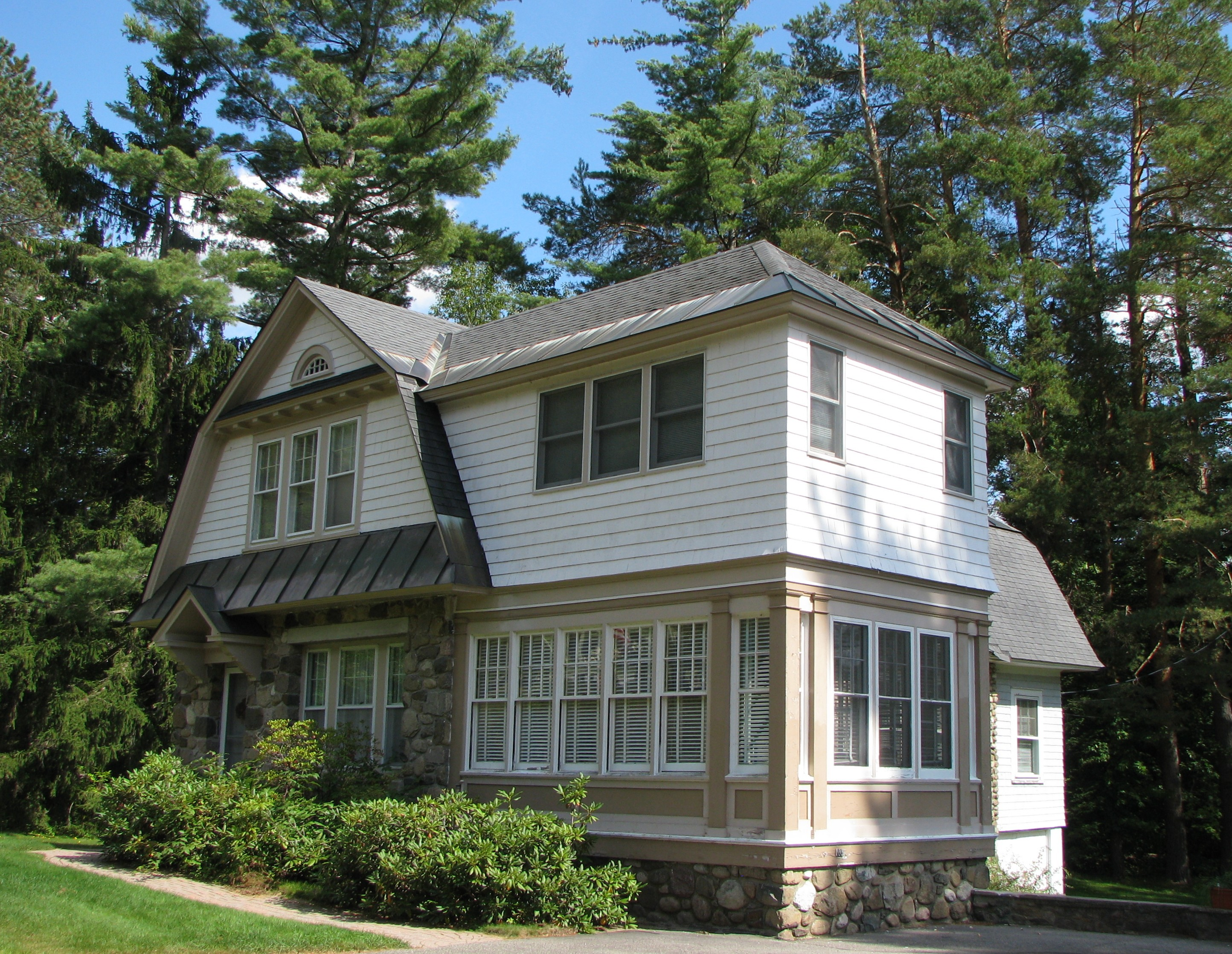
- Freer Cottage, September 2008

- Location within New York Location within the United States
- Location: 40 Kiwassa St., Saranac Lake, New York, U.S.
- Coordinates: 44°19′3″N 74°7′54″W
- Area: less than one acre
- Built: 1920
- Architectural style: Colonial Revival
- MPS: Saranac Lake MPS
- NRHP reference No.: 92001417
- Added to NRHP: November 6, 1992

Freer Cottage is a historic cure cottage located at Saranac Lake, Franklin County, New York. It was built about 1920 and modified in 1926–1928. It is a 1 1/2-story, wood-frame dwelling with a gambrel roof and 2-story addition in the Colonial Revival style. It features two cure porches. Also on the property is a contributing former garage.

It was listed on the National Register of Historic Places in 1992.
