= Pittenger Cottage =

Historic house in New York, United States

- U.S. National Register of Historic Places
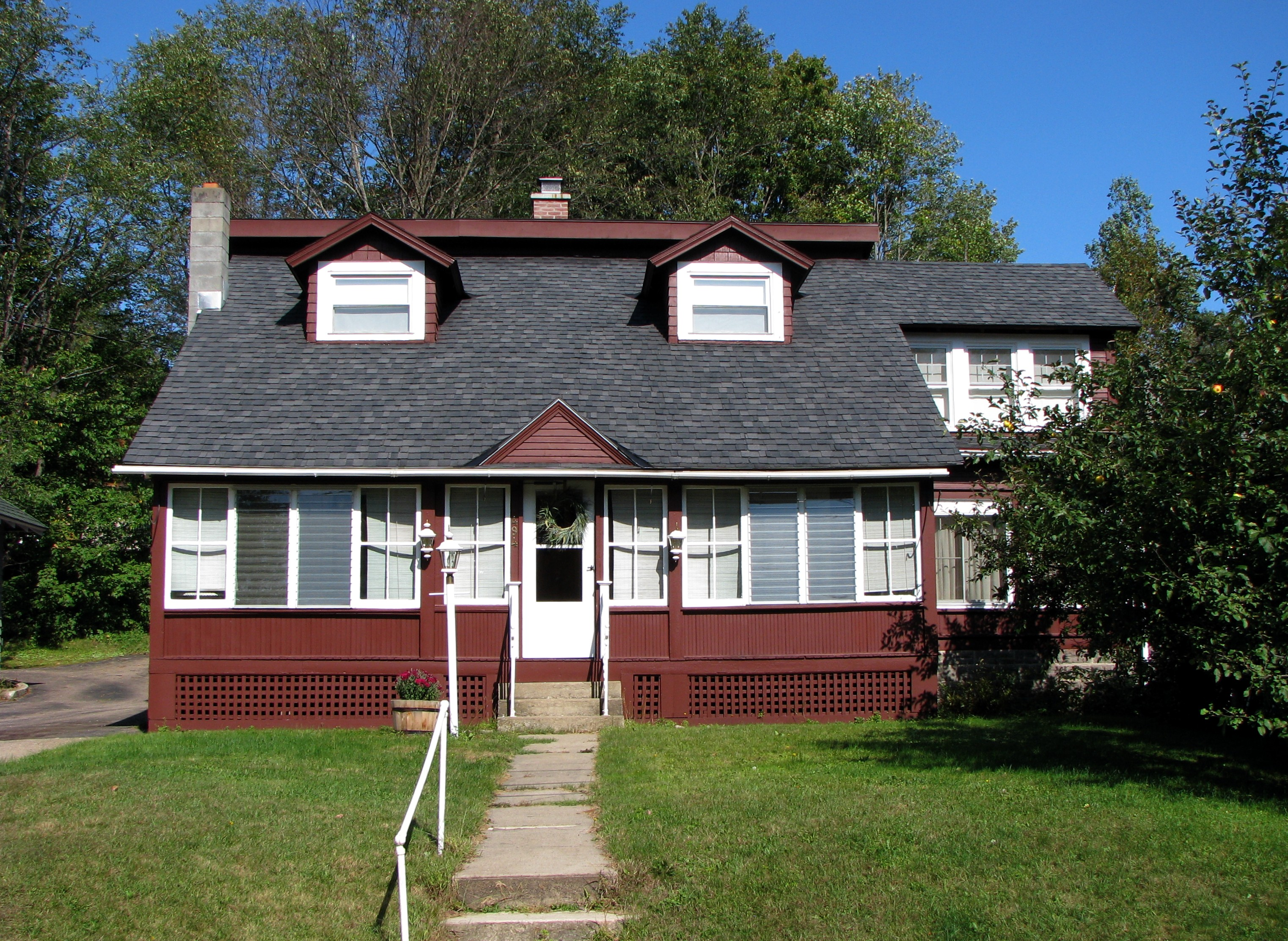
- Pittenger Cottage, September 2008

- Location within New York Location within the United States
- Location: 14 Forest Hill Ave., North Elba / Saranac Lake, New York
- Coordinates: 44°19′43″N 74°7′19″W
- Area: less than one acre
- Built: 1920
- Architectural style: Bungalow/Craftsman
- MPS: Saranac Lake MPS
- NRHP reference No.: 92001460
- Added to NRHP: November 6, 1992

Pittenger Cottage is a historic cure cottage located at Saranac Lake, town of North Elba in Essex County, New York. It was built about 1920 and is a two-story wood-frame dwelling with a small two-story wing and a verandah that extends across the front facade. It features five cure porches. It was operated as a private, registered sanatorium and boarding cottage from about 1921 to 1932.

It was listed on the National Register of Historic Places in 1992.
