= Little Red (Saranac Lake, New York) =

Historic house in New York, United States

- U.S. National Register of Historic Places
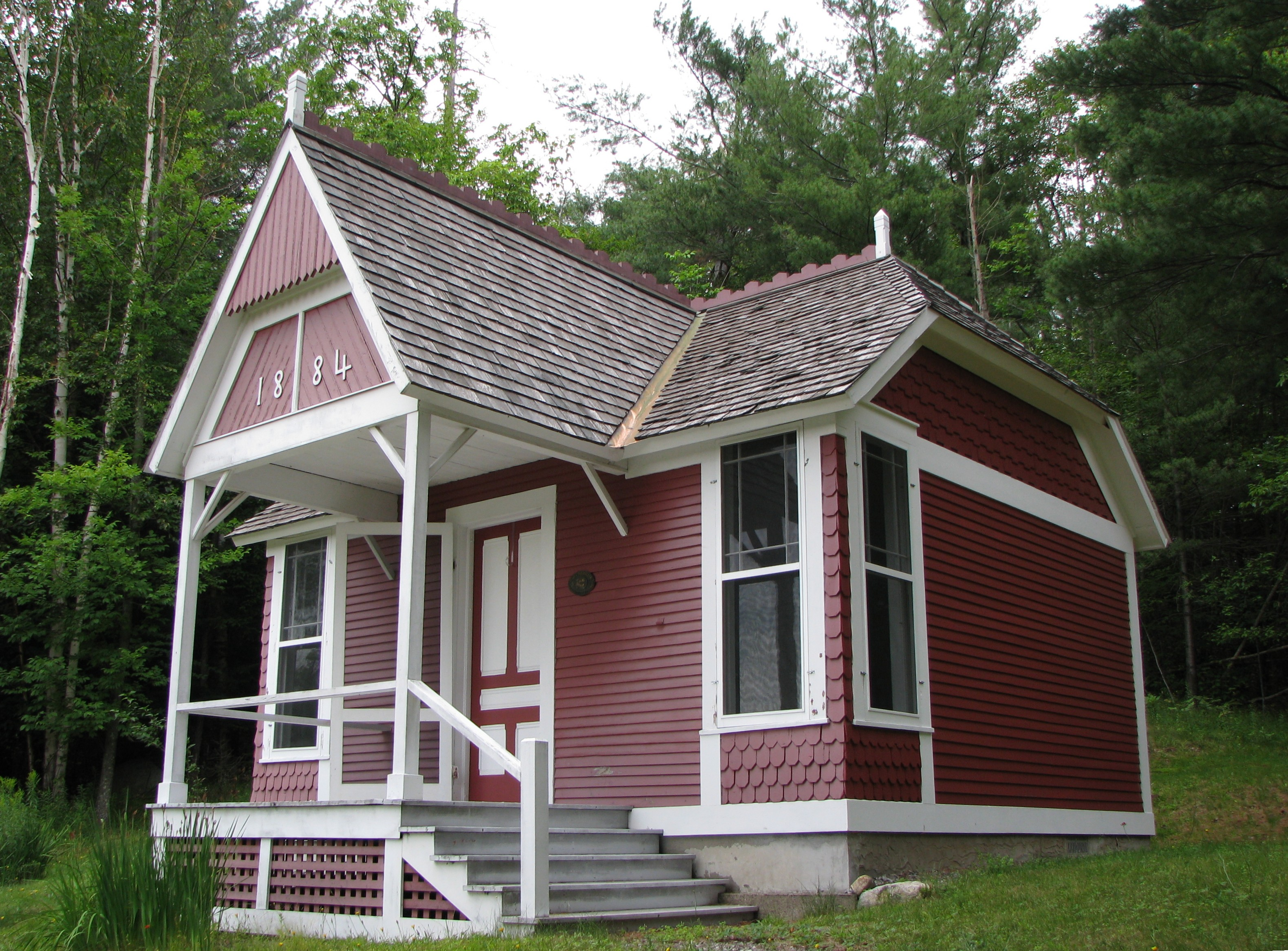
- Little Red, July 2008

- Location within New York Location within the United States
- Location: Algonquin Ave., Saranac Lake, New York, U.S.
- Coordinates: 44°19′6″N 74°9′29″W
- Area: less than one acre
- Built: 1885
- Architect: Riddle, Daniel W.
- Architectural style: Gothic Revival, Cure cottage
- MPS: Saranac Lake MPS
- NRHP reference No.: 92001446
- Added to NRHP: November 6, 1992

Little Red is a historic cure cottage located at Saranac Lake, Franklin County, New York. It was built about 1885 and moved about 1890, 1920, and 1935. It is a small, rectangular, 14 feet by 18 feet, one room wood-frame building covered by a jerkin head gable roof. Simple posts support a decorative gable roof over a small front porch. It was the original cure cottage of the Adirondack Cottage Sanitarium founded by Dr. Edward Livingston Trudeau and the second building of the institution.

It was listed on the National Register of Historic Places in 1992.
