= The Homestead (Saranac Lake, New York) =

Historic house in New York, United States

- U.S. National Register of Historic Places
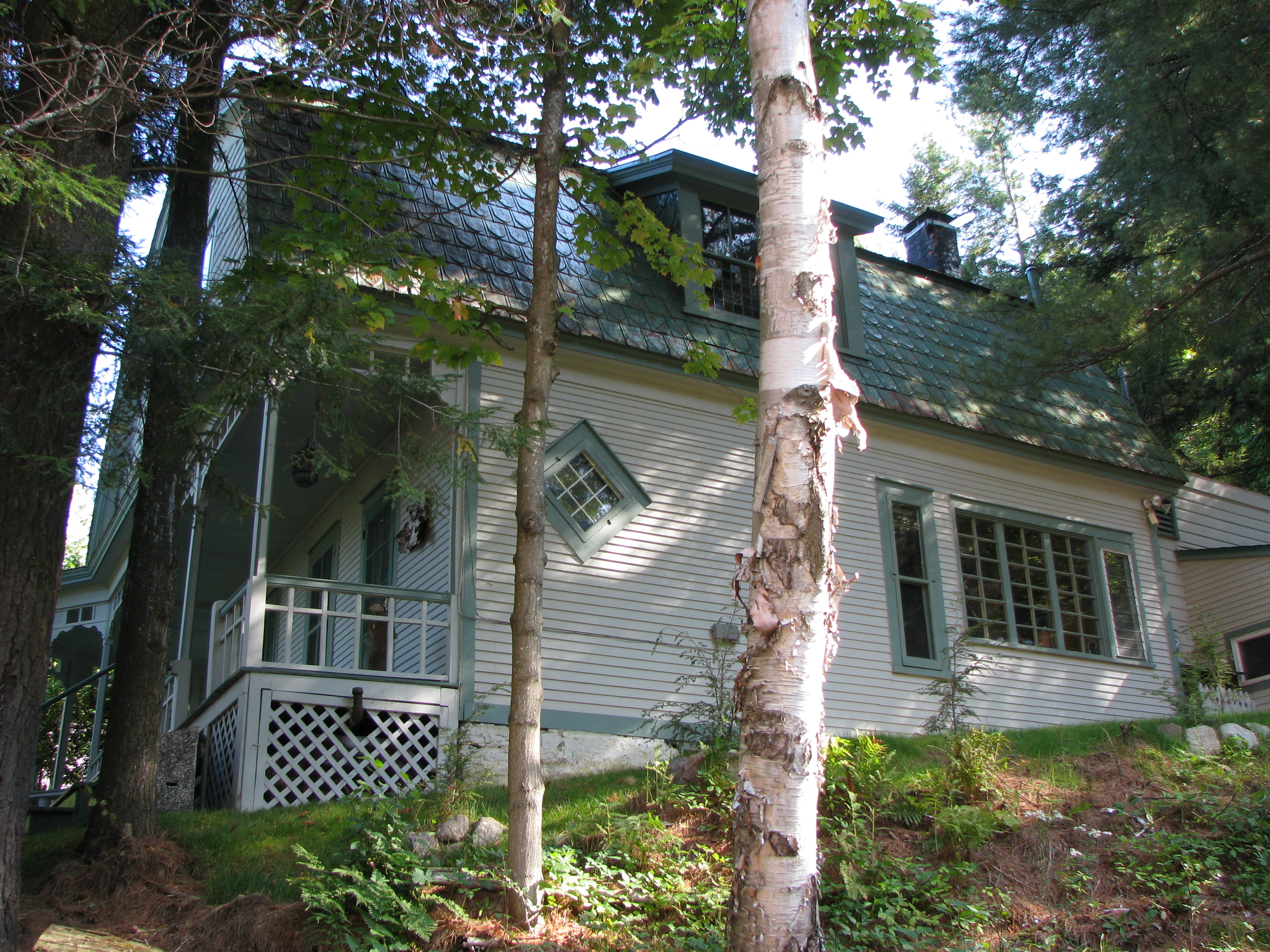
- The Homestead, September 2008

- Location within New York Location within the United States
- Location: 3 Maple Hill, Saranac Lake, New York, U.S.
- Coordinates: 44°19′24″N 74°7′55″W
- Area: less than one acre
- Built: 1890
- Architectural style: Colonial Revival
- MPS: Saranac Lake MPS
- NRHP reference No.: 92001418
- Added to NRHP: November 6, 1992

The Homestead is a historic cure cottage located at Saranac Lake, Franklin County, New York. It was built about 1890 and is a small, two-story, wood-frame dwelling with a gambrel roof in the Colonial Revival style. It features a large octagonal glass-enclosed porch and a verandah.

It was listed on the National Register of Historic Places in 1992.
