= Denny Cottage =

Historic house in New York, United States

- U.S. National Register of Historic Places
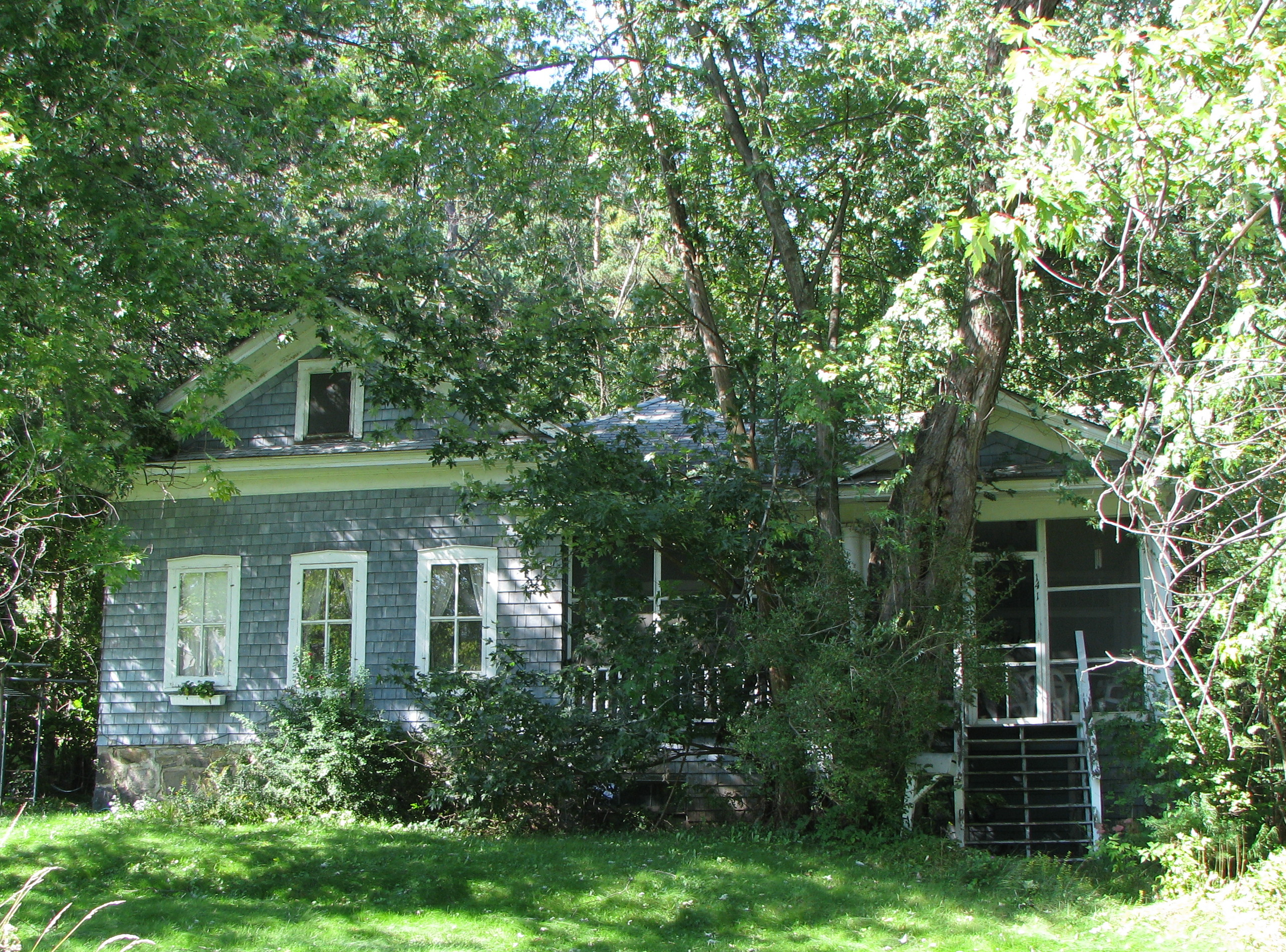
- Denny Cottage, September 2008

- Location within New York Location within the United States
- Location: 76 Bloomingdale Ave., St. Armand / Saranac Lake, New York
- Coordinates: 44°20′24″N 74°7′38″W
- Area: less than one acre
- Built: 1910
- Architectural style: Late 19th And Early 20th Century American Movements, Early 20th century
- MPS: Saranac Lake MPS
- NRHP reference No.: 92001452
- Added to NRHP: November 6, 1992

Denny Cottage is a historic cure cottage located at Saranac Lake, town of St. Armand in Essex County, New York. It was built about 1910 and is an L-shaped frame building on a fieldstone foundation, with a cobblestone chimney and gable roof. It features an L-shaped screened-in porch with its roof supported by Roman Doric order columns.

It was listed on the National Register of Historic Places in 1992.
