= Morgan Cottage =

Historic house in New York, United States

- U.S. National Register of Historic Places
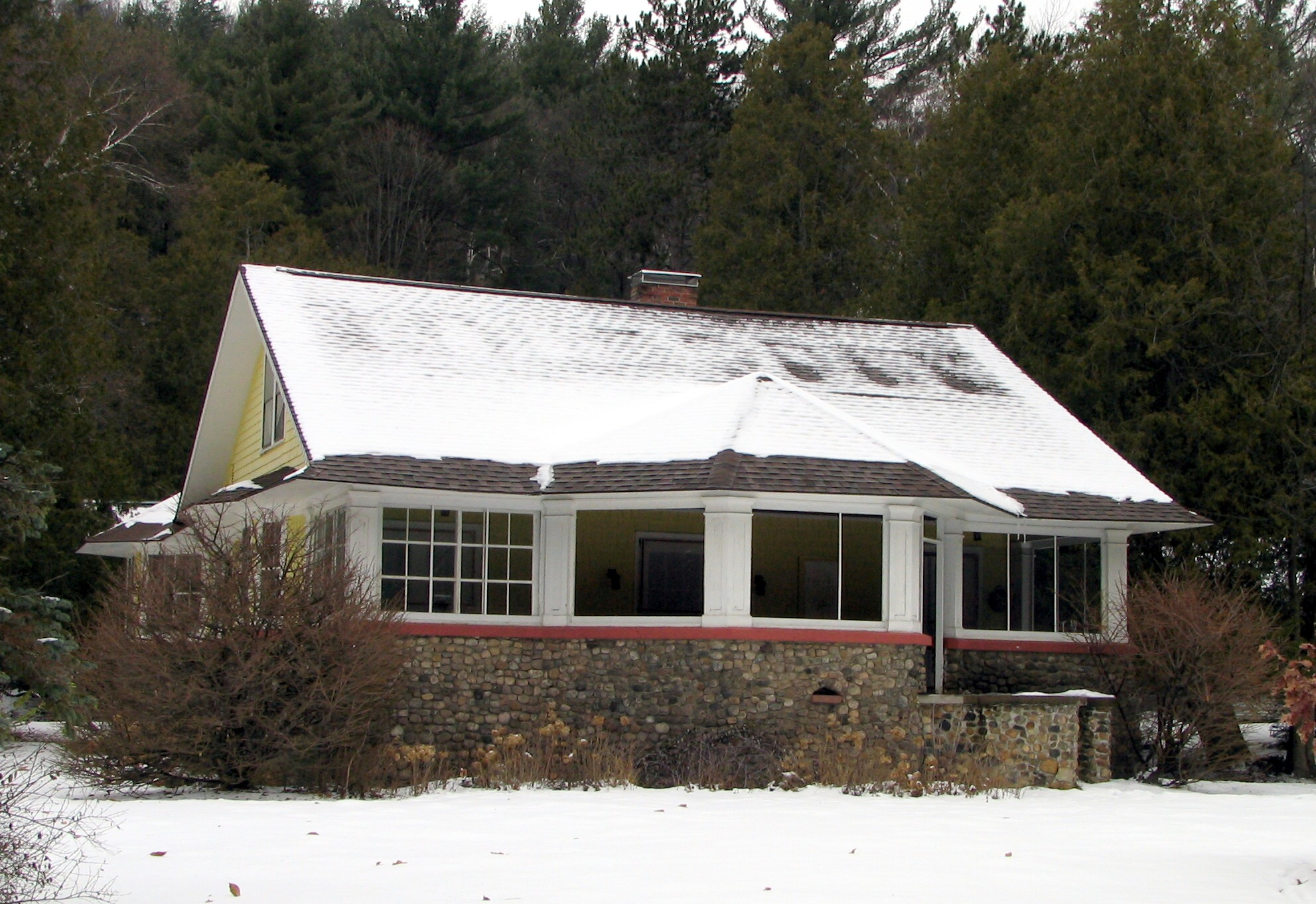
- Morgan Cottage, September 2008

- Location within New York Location within the United States
- Location: 100 Park Ave., Saranac Lake, St. Armand, New York, U.S.
- Coordinates: 44°19′58″N 74°7′48″W
- Area: less than one acre
- Built: 1916
- Architectural style: Bungalow/Craftsman
- MPS: Saranac Lake MPS
- NRHP reference No.: 92001426
- Added to NRHP: November 6, 1992

Morgan Cottage is a historic cure cottage located at Saranac Lake in the town of St. Armand, Essex and Franklin County, New York. It was built between 1915 and 1916 and is a 1 1/2-story, wood-frame structure on a concrete foundation. The houses as cobblestone walls to the base of the first story windows and clapboards above. It takes a bungalow form with a broad gable roof, overhanging eaves, stone walls, and inset verandah at the front. It features an octagonal cure porch, 12 feet in diameter.

It was listed on the National Register of Historic Places in 1992.
