= Lane Cottage (Saranac Lake, New York) =

Historic house in New York, United States

- U.S. National Register of Historic Places
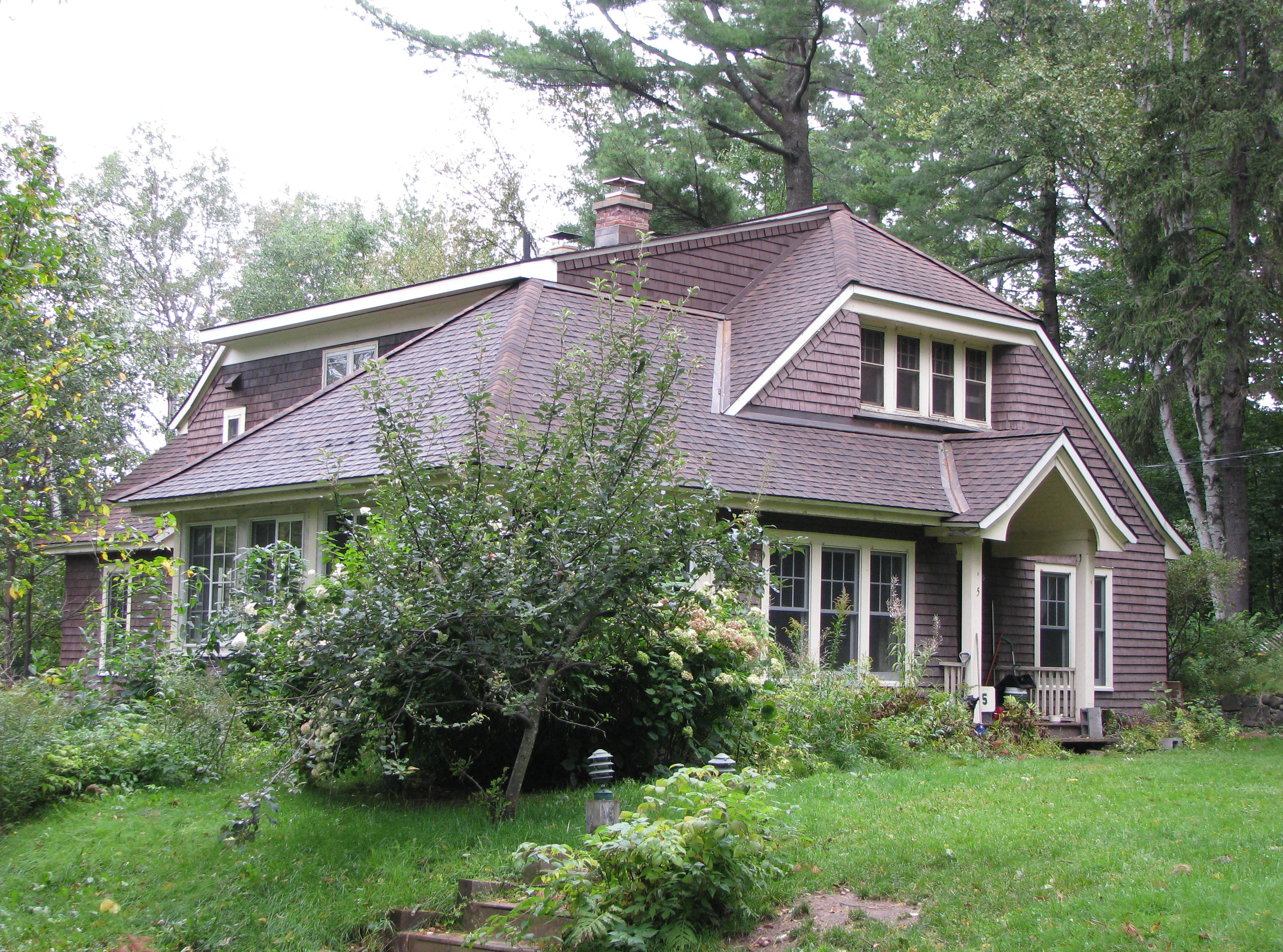
- Lane Cottage, September 2008

- Location within New York Location within the United States
- Location: 4 Rockledge Rd., North Elba / Saranac Lake, New York
- Coordinates: 44°19′47″N 74°7′22″W
- Area: less than one acre
- Built: 1923
- Architectural style: Shingle Style
- MPS: Saranac Lake MPS
- NRHP reference No.: 92001434
- Added to NRHP: November 6, 1992

Lane Cottage is a historic cure cottage located at Saranac Lake, town of North Elba in Essex County, New York. It was built about 1923 and is an L-shaped frame structure clad in cedar shingles with a jerkinhead gable roof in the Shingle Style. It features an open gable portico with gracefully curved gable returns and a cure porch. It was built by Edward Shaw for his wife, who had tuberculosis. The Shaws had two young children; fearing that they would contract TB from Mrs. Shaw, a separate house was built for them, nearby.

It was listed on the National Register of Historic Places in 1992.
