= Wilson Cottage =

Historic house in New York, United States

- U.S. National Register of Historic Places
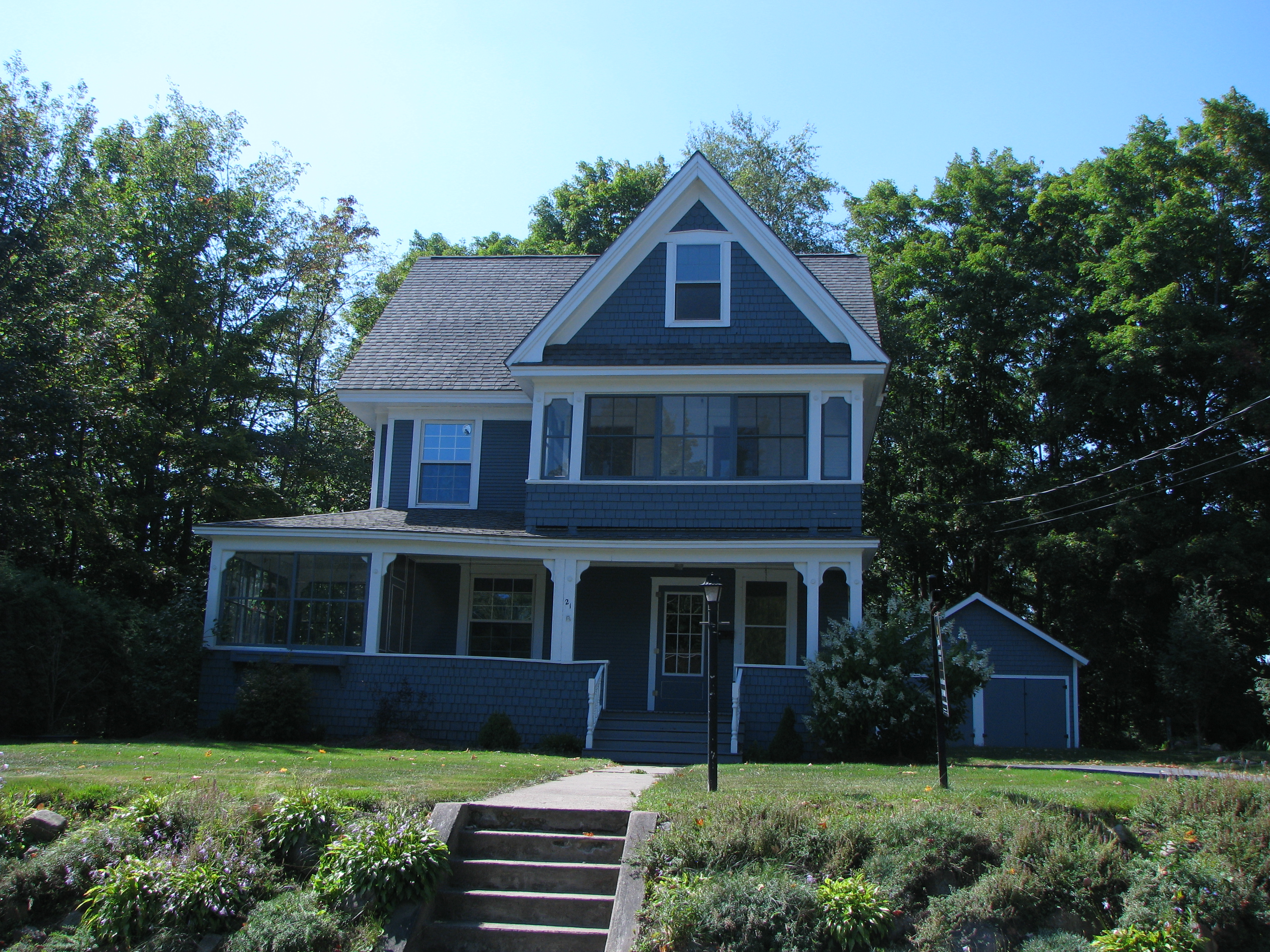
- Wilson Cottage, September 2008

- Location within New York Location within the United States
- Location: 8 Williams St., Saranac Lake, New York, U.S.
- Coordinates: 44°19′42″N 74°8′11″W
- Area: less than one acre
- Built: 1915
- Architectural style: Queen Anne
- MPS: Saranac Lake MPS
- NRHP reference No.: 92001443
- Added to NRHP: November 6, 1992

Wilson Cottage is a historic cure cottage located at Saranac Lake, Franklin County, New York. It was built about 1910 and is a 2 1/2-story, three-by-five-bay rectangular frame dwelling in the Queen Anne style. It features a partially enclosed wraparound porch on the front facade topped by an inset second story cure porch.

It was listed on the National Register of Historic Places in 1992.
