= Musselman Cottage =

Historic house in New York, United States

- U.S. National Register of Historic Places
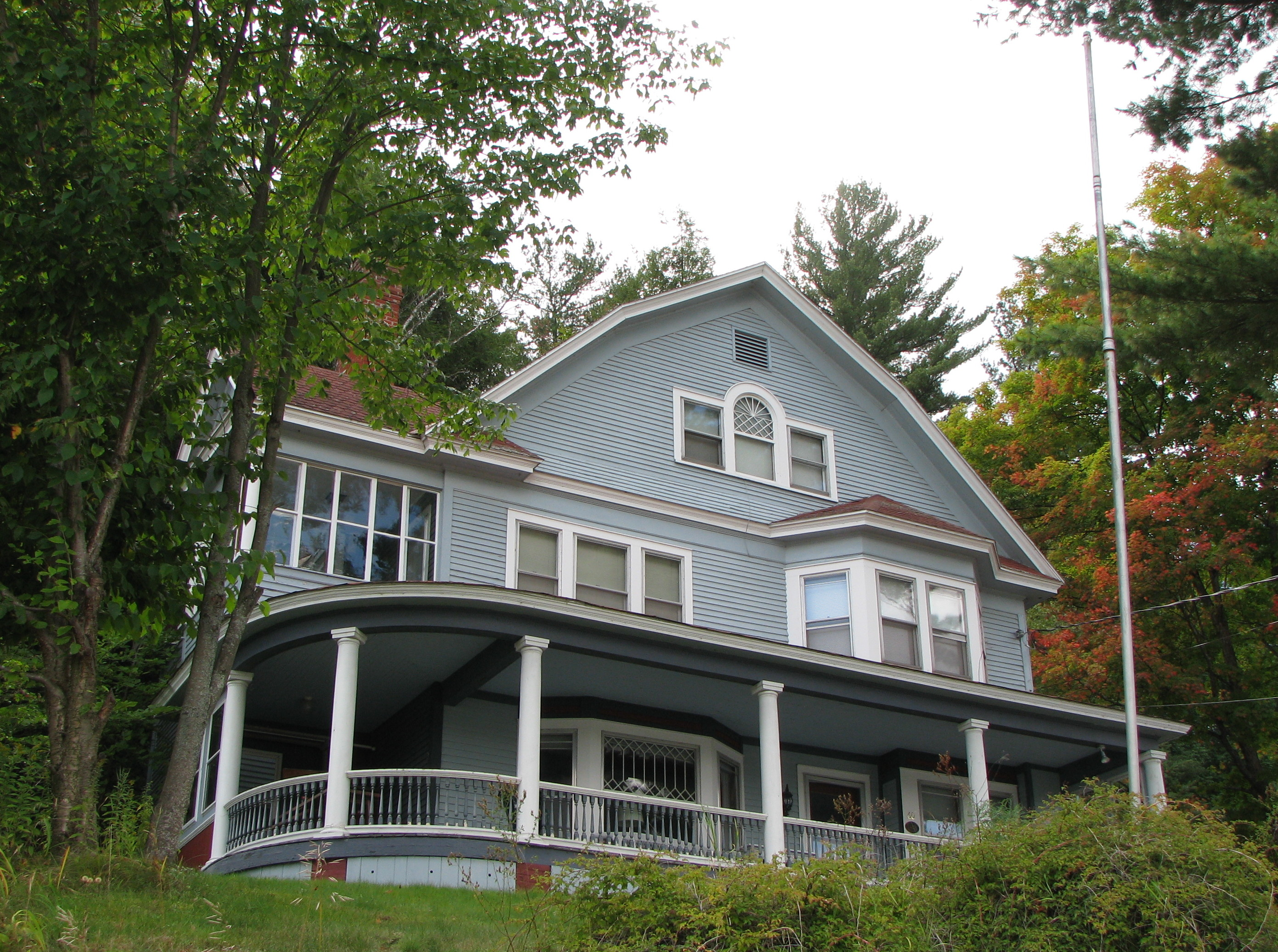
- Musselman Cottage, September 2008

- Location within New York Location within the United States
- Location: 25 Riverside Dr., Saranac Lake, New York, U.S.
- Coordinates: 44°19′20″N 74°7′46″W
- Area: less than one acre
- Built: 1907
- Architectural style: Colonial Revival
- MPS: Saranac Lake MPS
- NRHP reference No.: 92001431
- Added to NRHP: November 6, 1992

Musselman Cottage is a historic cure cottage located at Saranac Lake, Franklin County, New York. It was built about 1907 and is a 2 1/2-story, frame single-family dwelling covered by a cross-gabled roof. It has a central block with two attached porches and rests on an uncoursed rubble foundation. It features an 8-by-8-foot (2.4 by 2.4 m), glazed cure porch above the verandah.

It was listed on the National Register of Historic Places in 1992.
