= Highland Park Historic District (Saranac Lake, New York) =

Historic district in New York, United States

- U.S. National Register of Historic Places
- U.S. Historic district
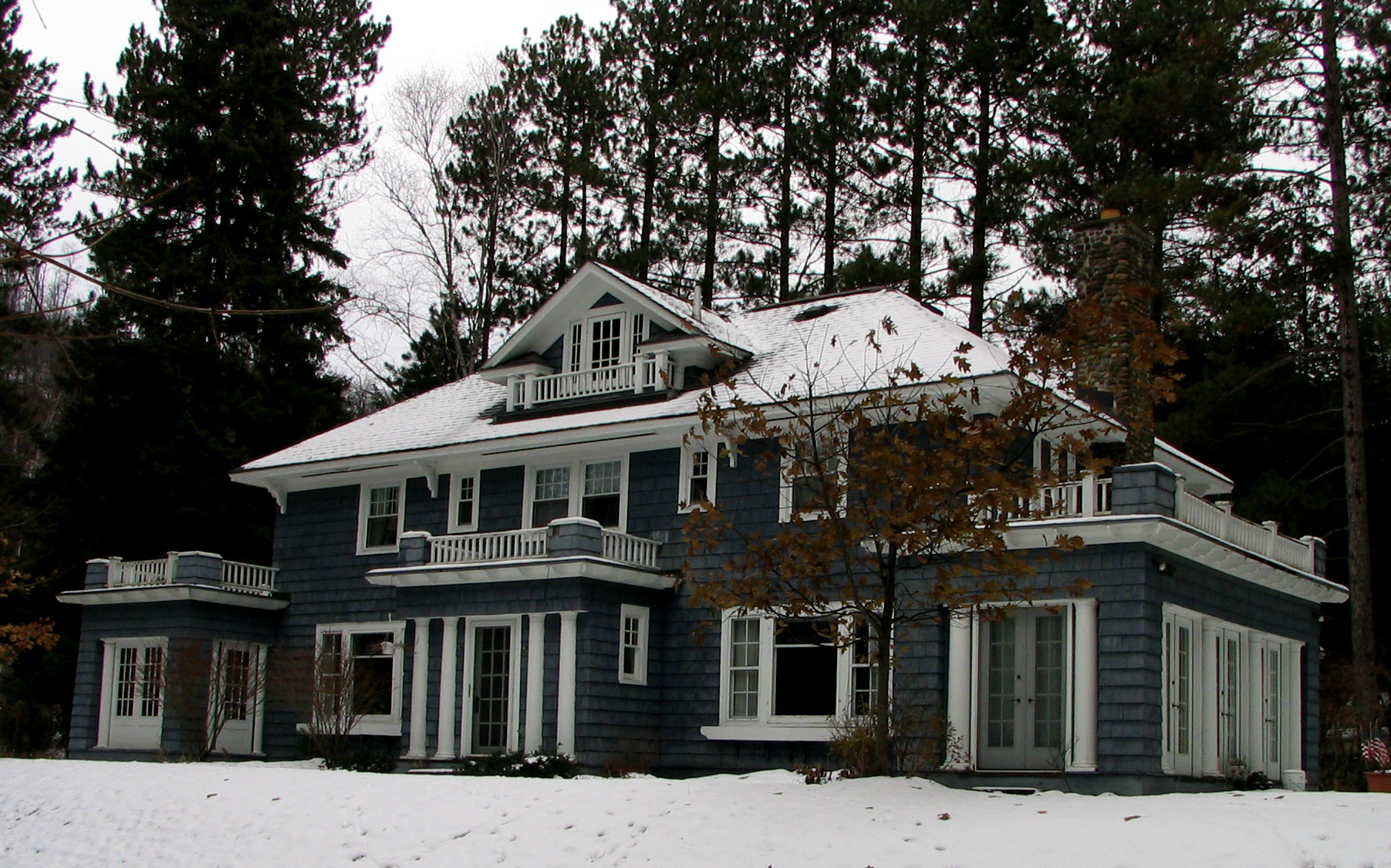
- The Christy Mathewson Cottage, November 2007

- Location within New York Location within the United States
- Location: Roughly, Park Ave. from Military Rd. to 170 Park Ave., Saranac Lake, New York
- Coordinates: 44°20′10″N 74°7′32″W
- Area: 0 acres (0 ha)
- Architect: Coulter, William L.; Et al.
- Architectural style: Colonial Revival, Tudor Revival, Shingle Style
- MPS: Saranac Lake MPS
- NRHP reference No.: 92001474
- Added to NRHP: November 6, 1992

Highland Park Historic District is a national historic district located at Saranac Lake, town of St. Armand, in Essex County, New York. The district contains 21 contributing buildings and one contributing object. It includes 17 private, single-family homes built between 1896 and 1930; most include "cure cottage" features.

It was listed on the National Register of Historic Places in 1992.
