= Hathaway Cottage =

Historic house in New York, United States

- U.S. National Register of Historic Places
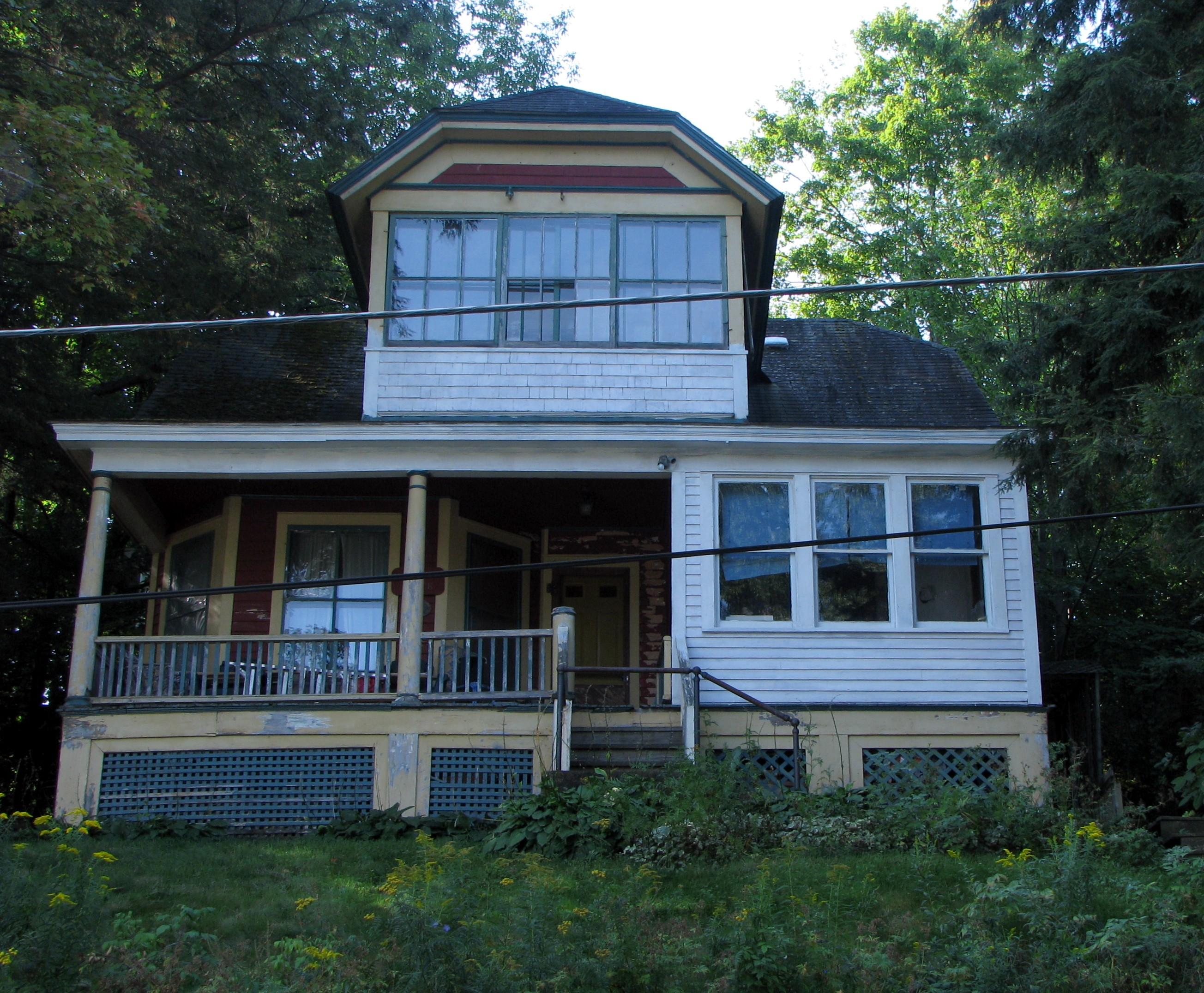
- Hathaway Cottage, September 2008

- Location within New York Location within the United States
- Location: 6 Charles St. Saranac Lake, New York, U.S.
- Coordinates: 44°19′50″N 74°8′18″W
- Area: less than one acre
- Built: 1900
- Architectural style: Colonial Revival, Queen Anne
- MPS: Saranac Lake MPS
- NRHP reference No.: 92001457
- Added to NRHP: November 6, 1992

Hathaway Cottage is a historic cure cottage located at Saranac Lake, Franklin County, New York. Built in 1900, it is a two-story, three bay wood frame residence with a jerkin-head roof and a prominent jerkin-head dormer and cure porch on the second floor over the first floor verandah.

It was listed on the National Register of Historic Places in 1992.
