= Witherspoon Cottage =

Historic house in New York, United States

- U.S. National Register of Historic Places
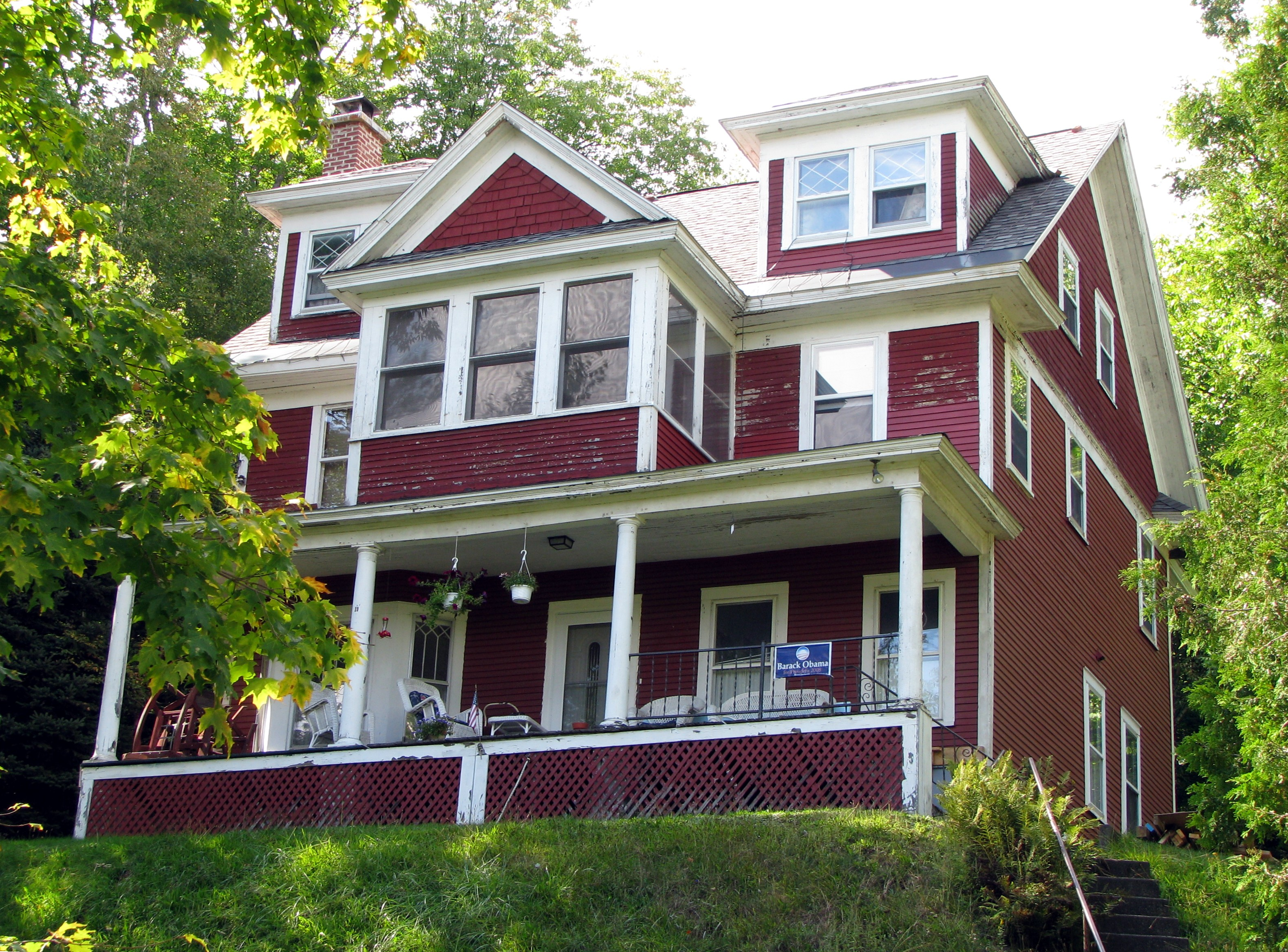
- Witherspoon Cottage, September 2008

- Location within New York Location within the United States
- Location: 3 Kiwassa Rd., Saranac Lake, New York, U.S.
- Coordinates: 44°19′12″N 74°7′46″W
- Area: less than one acre
- Built: 1910
- Architect: Buck, Mr.
- Architectural style: Queen Anne
- MPS: Saranac Lake MPS
- NRHP reference No.: 92001415
- Added to NRHP: November 6, 1992

Witherspoon Cottage is a historic cure cottage in Saranac Lake, Franklin County, New York. It was built about 1910 as a boarding house and is a 2 1/2-story, square frame dwelling in the Queen Anne style. The gable roof has hipped roof dormers. It features two cure porches; one above the verandah and a second supported by four posts and spanning two-thirds of the northwest facade.

It was listed on the National Register of Historic Places in 1992.
