= Larom Cottage =

Historic house in New York, United States

- U.S. National Register of Historic Places
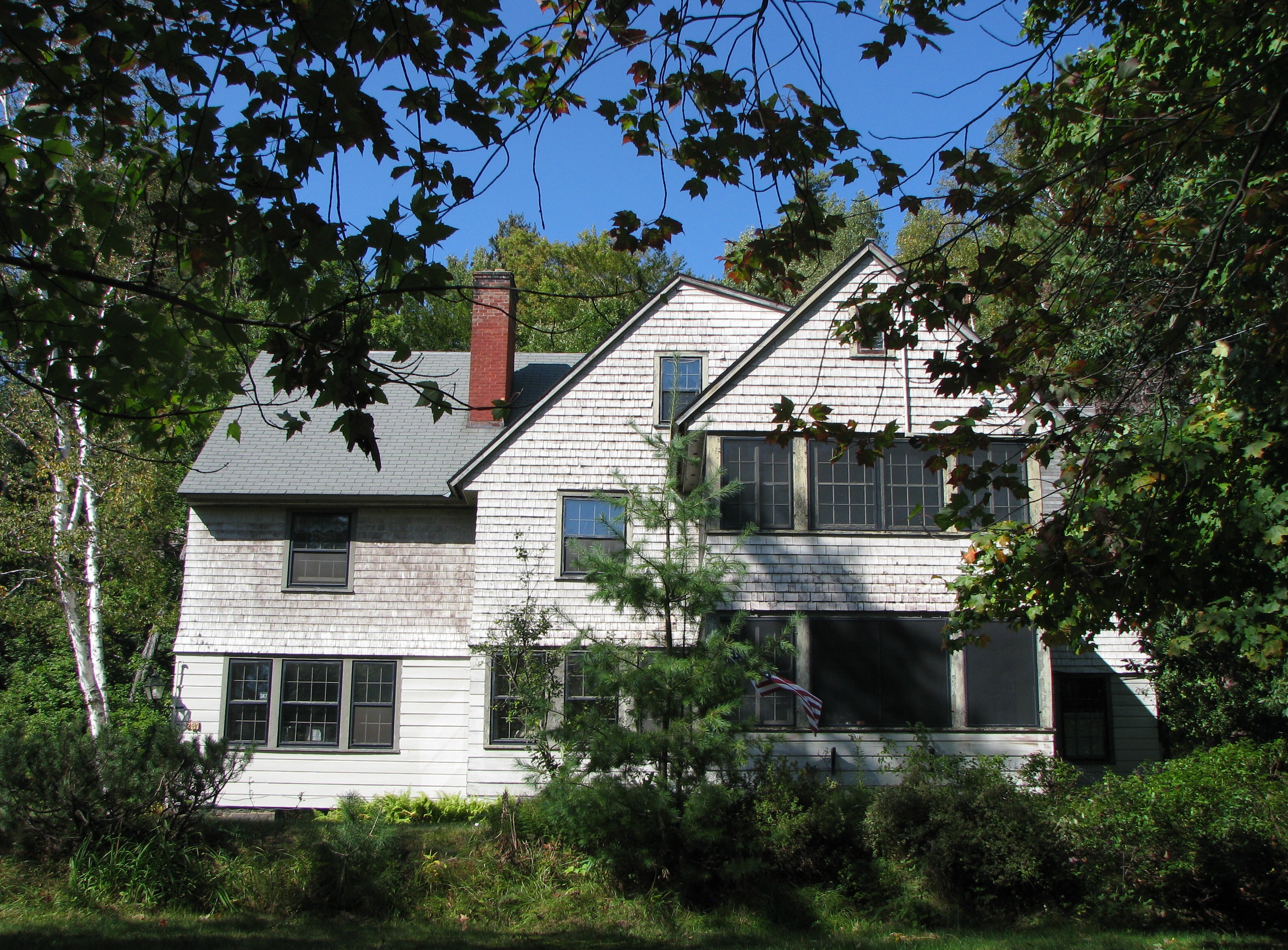
- Larom Cottage, September 2008

- Location within New York Location within the United States
- Location: 112 Park Ave., Saranac Lake, New York, U.S.
- Coordinates: 44°20′2″N 74°7′42″W
- Area: less than one acre
- Built: 1905
- Architectural style: Queen Anne
- MPS: Saranac Lake MPS
- NRHP reference No.: 92001428
- Added to NRHP: November 6, 1992

Larom Cottage is a historic cure cottage located at Saranac Lake, Franklin County, New York. It was built between 1905 and 1910 and is a 2 1/2-story, wood-frame dwelling with a stone foundation and gable roof in the Queen Anne style. It features a first-floor cure porch located in a 2 1/2-story addition.

It was listed on the National Register of Historic Places in 1992.
