= Dr. A. H. Allen Cottage =

Historic house in New York, United States

- U.S. National Register of Historic Places
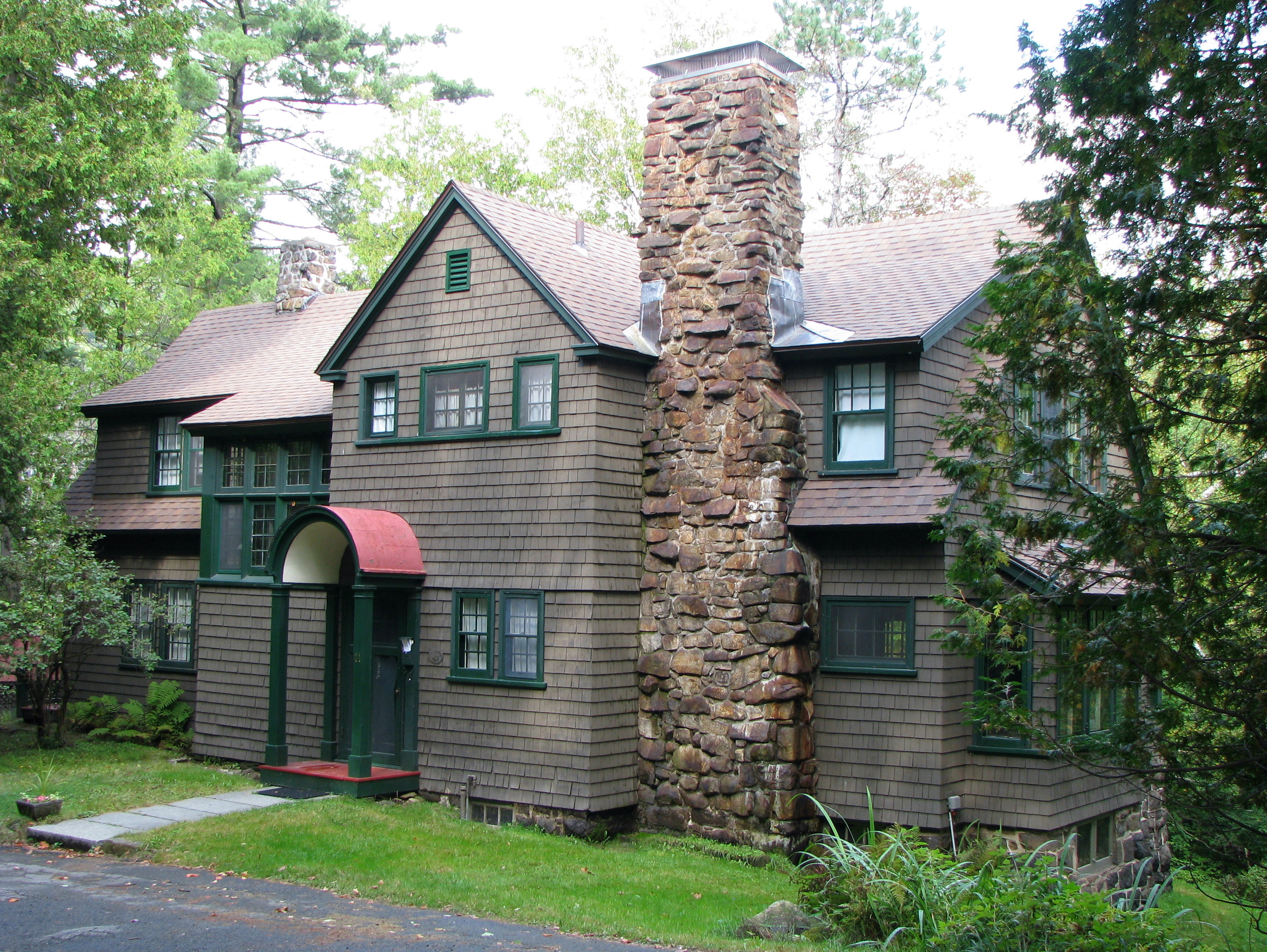
- Dr. A. H. Allen Cottage, September 2008

- Location within New York Location within the United States
- Location: 22 Catherine St. Saranac Lake, New York, U.S.
- Coordinates: 44°19′53″N 74°7′47″W
- Area: less than one acre
- Built: 1909
- Architect: Scopes & Feustmann
- Architectural style: Bungalow/Craftsman
- MPS: Saranac Lake MPS
- NRHP reference No.: 92001454
- Added to NRHP: November 6, 1992

Dr. A. H. Allen Cottage is a historic cure cottage located at Saranac Lake in Franklin County, New York. It was built in 1909 and is a two-story wood-frame structure clad in cedar shingles. It is a rectangular structure with a gabled roof, large shed roof dormer on the north end of the house, and non intersecting gables on the south end on both sides. It features a verandah and sleeping porch.

It was listed on the National Register of Historic Places in 1992.
