= Dr. Henry Leetch House =

Historic house in New York, United States

- U.S. National Register of Historic Places
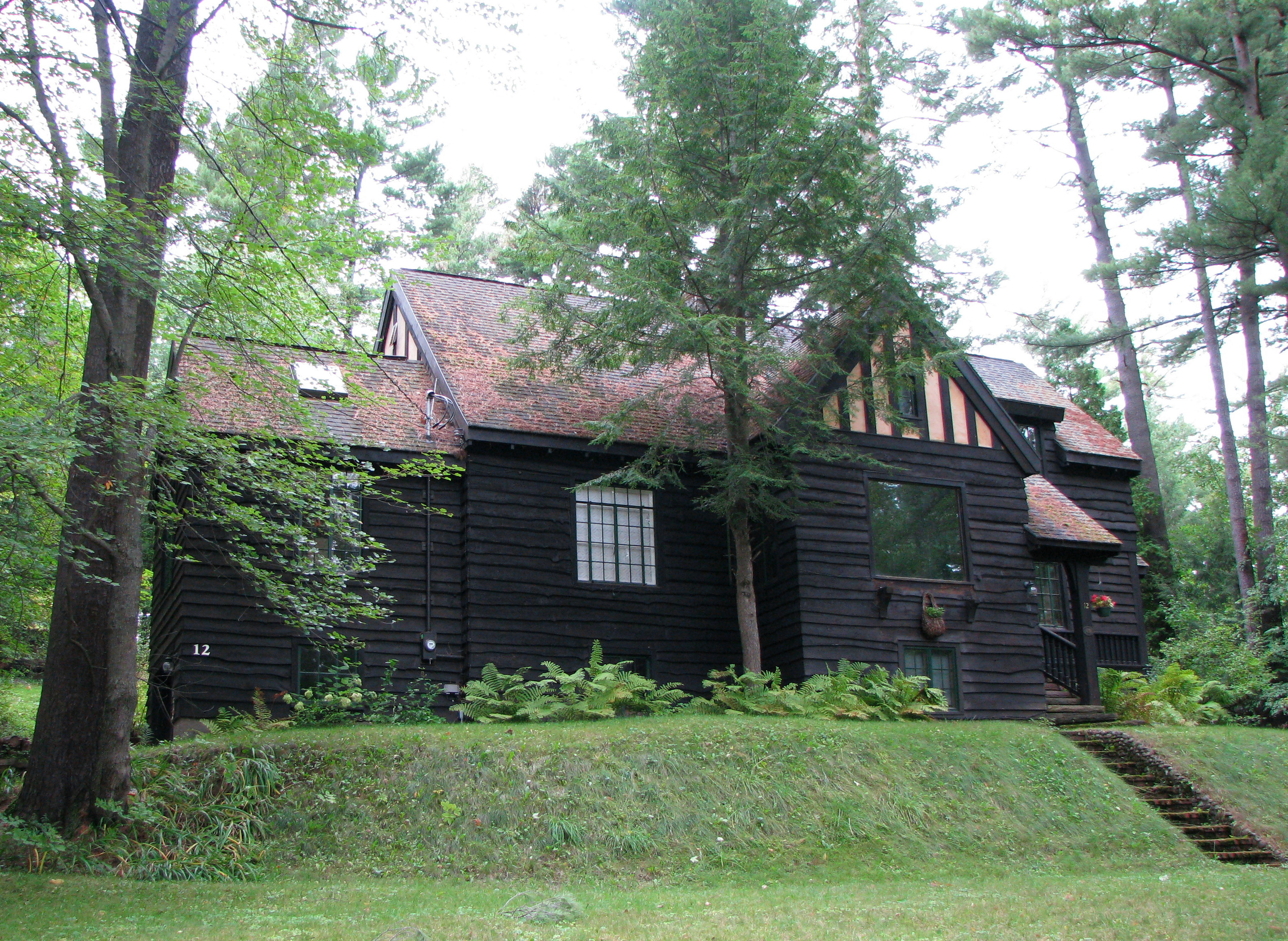
- Dr. Henry Leetch House, September 2008

- Location within New York Location within the United States
- Location: 3 Johnson Rd., North Elba / Saranac Lake, New York
- Coordinates: 44°19′35″N 74°8′0″W
- Area: less than one acre
- Built: 1931
- Architect: Distin, William G.; Branch & Callanan
- Architectural style: Tudor Revival
- MPS: Saranac Lake MPS
- NRHP reference No.: 92001471
- Added to NRHP: November 6, 1992

Dr. Henry Leetch House is a historic cure cottage located at Saranac Lake, town of North Elba in Essex County, New York. It was built between 1931 and 1932 and is a two-story, wood-frame structure on a fieldstone foundation with a gable roof in the Tudor Revival style. It features cure porch built over the garage and another at the rear of the house. It was designed by noted local architect William L. Distin for Dr. Henry Leetch, who specialized in treating tuberculosis, and who had the disease himself.

It was listed on the National Register of Historic Places in 1992.
