= Peyton Clark Cottage =

Historic house in New York, United States

- U.S. National Register of Historic Places
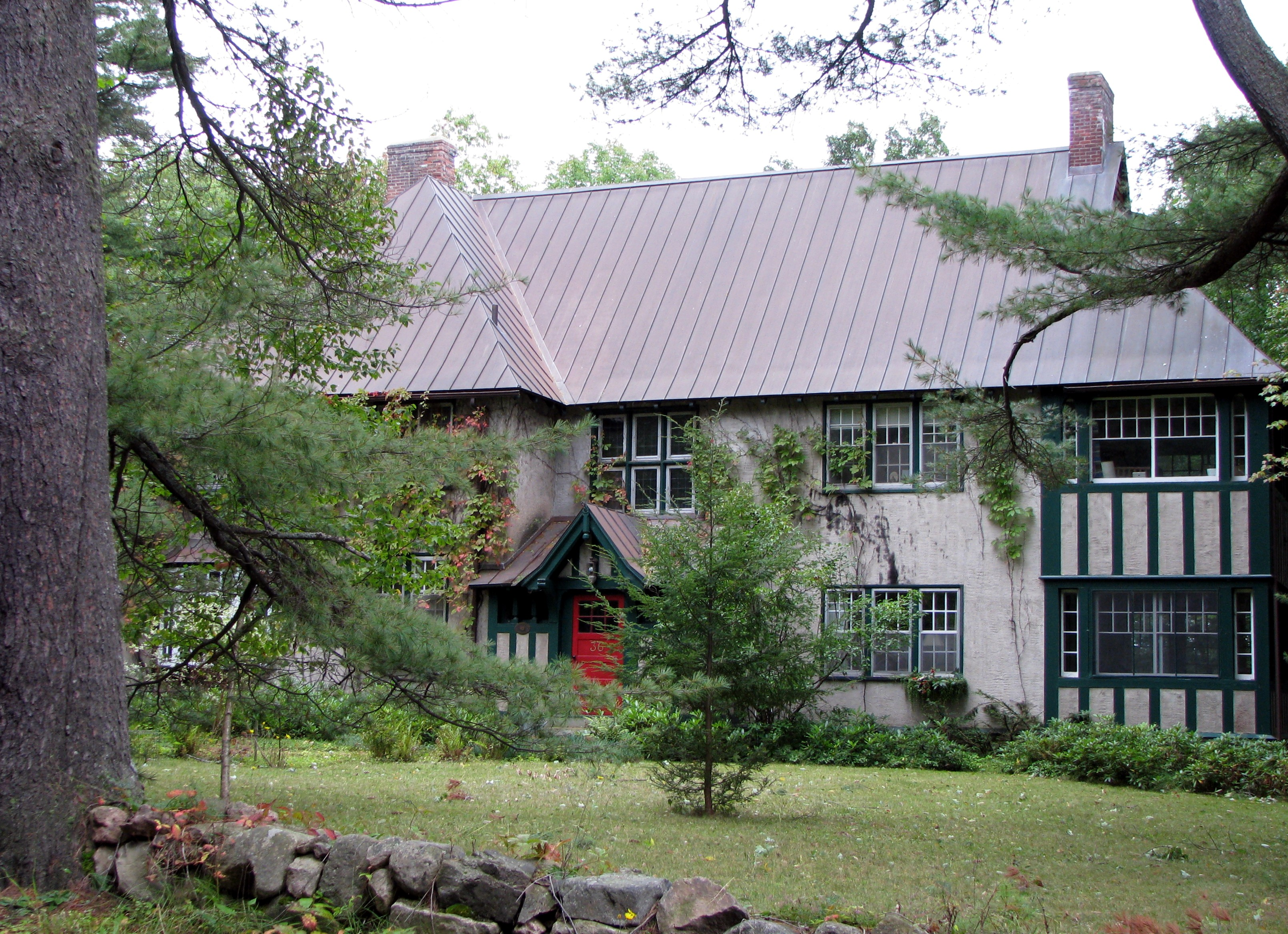
- Peyton Clark Cottage, September 2008

- Location within New York Location within the United States
- Location: 9 Rockledge Rd., St. Armand / Saranac Lake, New York
- Coordinates: 44°19′48″N 74°7′21″W
- Area: less than one acre
- Built: 1915
- Architect: Scopes, William
- Architectural style: Tudor Revival
- MPS: Saranac Lake MPS
- NRHP reference No.: 92001435
- Added to NRHP: November 6, 1992

Peyton Clark Cottage, also known as "Woodthorpe," is a historic cure cottage located at Saranac Lake, town of St. Armand in Essex County, New York. It was built in 1915 and is a 2 1/2-story rectangular structure with stucco siding and a gable roof and trimmed with green wood in the Tudor Revival style. It features two over/under cure porches running along the entire south side. A 1971 fire destroyed five bedrooms and the roof.

It was listed on the National Register of Historic Places in 1992.
