= Stevenson Cottage =

Historic house in New York, United States

- U.S. National Register of Historic Places
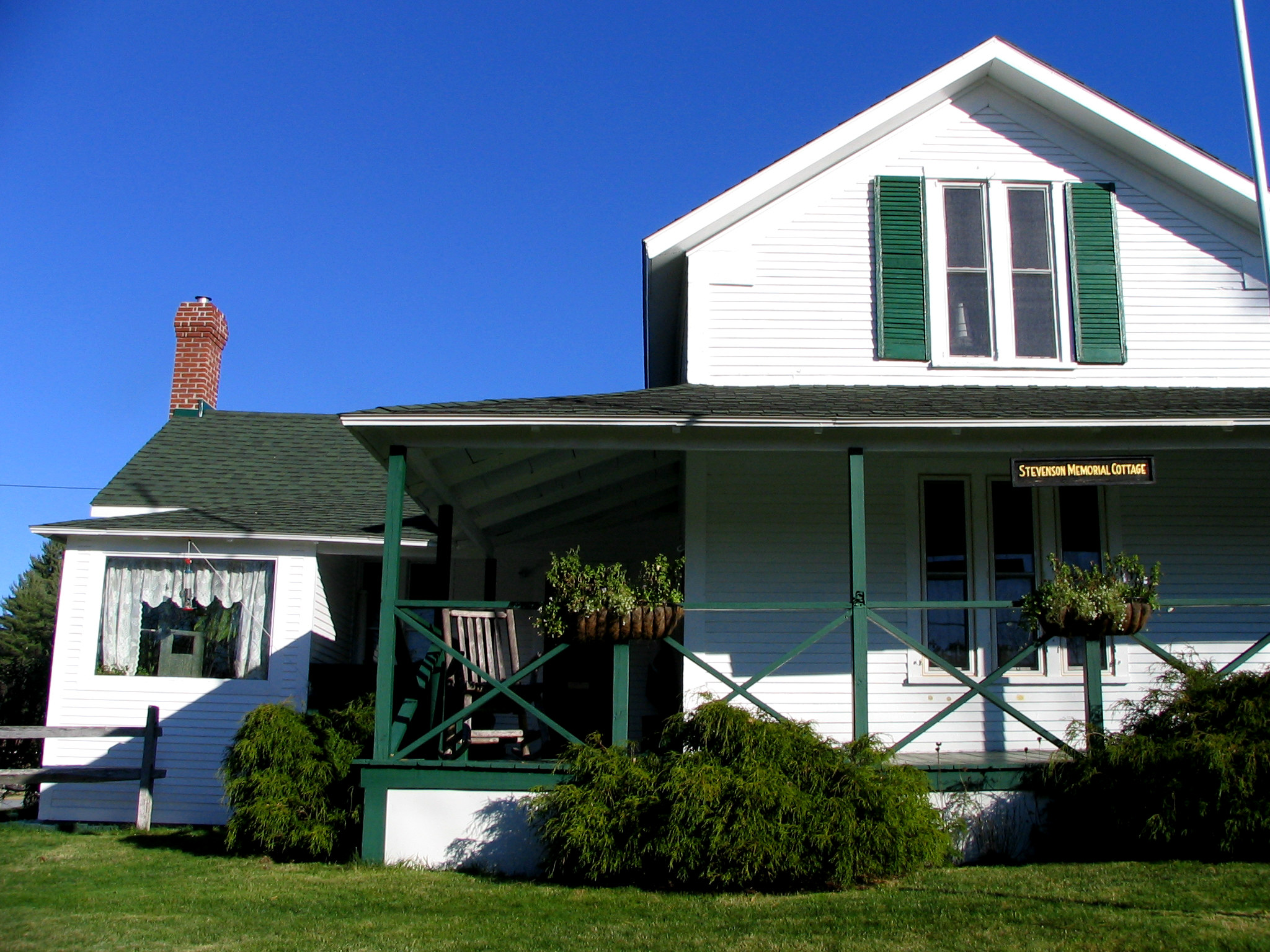
- Stevenson Cottage, September 2007

- Location within New York Location within the United States
- Location: Stevenson Ln., St. Armand / Saranac Lake, New York
- Coordinates: 44°19′50.888″N 74°7′26.31″W
- Area: less than one acre
- Built: 1865
- MPS: Saranac Lake MPS
- NRHP reference No.: 92001441
- Added to NRHP: November 06, 1992

The Stevenson Cottage is a historic house in the village of Saranac Lake, in the town of St. Armand, Essex County, New York. It currently serves as a museum dedicated to the life of the author Robert Louis Stevenson. Originally known as Baker Cottage, Stevenson took up residence there during the winter of 1887–88 while seeking treatment for lung disease. The site was dedicated to Stevenson and the preservation of his legacy when the Stevenson Society of America, Inc. was formed, on October 30, 1915. The cottage currently remains in the possession of the Stevenson Society and continues to serve as a memorial and museum to Stevenson's life.

== Design ==
The cottage is a 1^{1}/_{2}-story, L-shaped wood-frame building on a fieldstone foundation with wood-frame siding.

== Background ==
Baker Cottage was originally built in 1855 by Col. Milote Baker for his employee, Ebenezer Griffith. By 1866 the property was vacant, and Baker's son, Andrew Jackson Baker, moved into the two-story cabin with his new bride, Mary. Andrew proceeded to build off the cabin on the north and south sides, giving the Cottage its present-day appearance. Andrew also built a farm around the cottage with corn fields, chicken coops, and livestock. As part of the expansion, Baker's friend Alfred Donaldson encouraged him to build an open fireplace, only the second in the area, and agreed to take on half the cost.

This was the primary residence for the Baker family for 58 years, and it also headquartered Baker's Adirondack guide business. In the spring, Baker would set up tents in his yard that city-dwelling Adirondack enthusiasts could use as a base for their excursions into the wilderness, often guided by Baker himself. The “Adirondack Club” – which included Ralph Waldo Emmerson, William James Stillman, James Russell Lowell, and Louis Agassiz – would sometimes stay with the Bakers, before traveling deeper into the Adirondack wilderness to the “Philosopher’s Camp,” which first gathered in July 1858, at Follansbee Pond.

== The Stevenson Expedition ==
In 1887, Robert Louis Stevenson was advised by Dr. George Balfour (Stevenson's uncle and doctor) to travel to the American Rocky Mountains for his health. Stevenson, an invalid, suffered from a myriad of health conditions, and the prevailing thought at the time was that clean air was beneficial to victims of Tuberculosis, like Stevenson was presumed to be. Following Balfour's recommendation, Stevenson, as well as his wife, stepchildren, and mother, boarded the steamship Ludgate Hill on the Thames, with the goal of reaching New York, and then Colorado. This plan was interrupted, however, as Stevenson developed a cold before the steamship made it to New York. For the author, colds often preceded hemorrhaging events from his diseased lungs. Fearing that Stevenson wouldn't make it to Colorado, a New York City lung doctor advised Stevenson to instead turn his sights to the Adirondack Sanitorium in Saranac Lake, run by Dr. E. L. Trudeau, who became the founder of the American Lung Association. It was nearer, cheaper, and had plenty of clean mountain air. Stevenson's wife Fanny and stepson Lloyd Osbourne were sent ahead to find a place for the family to stay. They found it by way of an “accidental meeting”, as described by Andrew Baker's daughter, Bertha:

“Papa was on his way to town and on reaching the village, he saw one of his neighbors standing in the street talking to Mrs. Robert Louis Stevenson. It seems this gentleman had just given directions to Mrs. S. as to finding our house. He then said that she could speak with Papa since he was coming. She did so and arrangements were made for rental of the house”.

The rest of the Stevenson expedition arrived on 3 October 1887.

Though the Bakers typically covered the open fireplace during the winter to keep the heat from the several wood stoves from escaping, Stevenson greatly enjoyed spending time around it, and asked to keep it open throughout the winter. While at Baker Cottage, Stevenson referred to it as the “Hunter’s Home” and did what he could to maintain the illusion of a hunting lodge, such as refusing to cover their table with a cloth and wearing Native American-made winter clothes made from bison. When writing to his friend Will Low, he said, “I have to trouble you and your wife to come and slumber. Not now however: I won’t have you until I have a buffalo robe and leggings, lest you should want to paint me as a plain man, which I am not, but a rank Saranacker and wild man of the woods”.

While at Baker Cottage, Stevenson could often be found in bed. Dr. E. L. Trudeau wrote of finding him there, “his long legs drawn up for a table, his head propped forward by pillows; in one hand a pencil, in the other a cigarette; sheets of scribbled paper everywhere, the windows shut, the room stuffy with stove heat and tobacco smoke. Stevenson was already a literary celebrity when he arrived in Saranac Lake and continued to write while at the cottage. In the six-and-a-half months he spent at Baker’s, Stevenson wrote half of The Master of Ballantrae, as well as a series of twelve essays: “A Chapter on Dreams,” “The Lantern Bearers,” “Beggars,” “Pulvis et Umbra,” “Gentleman,” “Some Gentlemen in Fiction,” “Popular Authors,” “Epilogue to An Inland Voyage,” “Letters to a Young Gentleman,” “Contributions to the History of Fife” “The Education of an Engineer” and “A Christmas Sermon.” He also co-authored The Wrong Box with his stepson Lloyd Osbourne. While in Saranac Lake, he planned a voyage to the South Seas and was commissioned by Sam McClure to write about it. McClure agreed to finance the expenses of Stevenson's yacht in return. It was with sights set on the South Seas that the Stevenson expedition left Baker Cottage behind on 16 April 1888, and Stevenson would ultimately settle in Samoa for the last five years of his life.

== The Stevenson Society of America ==
Despite Baker Cottage's long history as a destination for tourists looking to enjoy a controlled wilderness experience, it was Stevenson's winter there that the cottage came to be known for. Literary pilgrims made their way to the Bakers’ home to see where Stevenson had lived, touch the furniture he had used, and ask the Bakers questions about the author. Two such pilgrims were writer Stephan Chalmers and Robert H. Davis, columnist for the New York Sun. In August 1914, they visited the cottage and were taken with the idea that it would be the perfect place for a memorial plaque in Stevenson's memory. With the Bakers’ approval, they formed the Stevenson Memorial Committee, which included Associated Press founder, Charles Palmer, Gutzon Borglum, who would go on to sculpt Mt. Rushmore, and William Morris Sr., a theatrical agent and manager who founded the William Morris Agency.

The unveiling of the plaque also marked the formation of a permanent Stevenson Society. In 1916, the Society leased two rooms from the Bakers for public showing and filled them with various artifacts from Stevenson's life. Interest in the Society grew rapidly as news outlets and magazines began spreading news of the Saranac Lake Memorial project. Friends and family of Stevenson approved of the memorial and Society, with many of them donating artifacts to the museum. The Stevenson Society also began to hold annual meetings, the 1928 meeting attracting upwards of 400 attendees.

In 1920, the Society lengthened its name from Stevenson Society to the Stevenson Society of America, Inc. Following the Bakers’ passing in 1924, ownership of the house transferred to their son-in-law, Joseph H. Vincent, who summarily evicted the Stevenson Society, who then transferred the various artifacts to the local library and the Adirondack National Bank for safekeeping. Under the leadership of then-president of the Society, Col. Walter Scott, a deal was struck with Vincent, and the society purchased the property and everything in it in 1925.

The Cottage was maintained by the Stevenson Society until 1951, when due to financial strains caused by the Great Depression and World War II, the ownership of the museum was turned over to the Village of Saranac Lake, while the Stevenson Society maintained ownership of the collection of artifacts and was responsible for holding annual meetings. In 1972, ownership of the property reverted to the Society, after the new village mayor, John Brewster, relinquished ownership in the name of cutting Village costs. The then-president John F. Delahant took on an increased workload and even supported the Cottage with his personal funds in order to ensure its continued survival.

== Museum ==
The site has hosted the Stevenson Cottage Museum since the founding of the Stevenson Society, in 1915, making it the first Stevenson museum to open and the world's first dedicated Stevenson site. Its collection includes original furniture from Stevenson's stay, scrapbooks with large sections of the author's works, garments worn by Stevenson, and paintings and photographs of him and his family.

In 2024, a new board of directors was established, including a new president, Trenton B. Olsen, and members Phillip Lopate, Carla Manfredi, and Nicholas Rankin, in an effort to preserve the museum's future.

The museum is open between 9:30 AM – 12:00 PM and 1:00 PM – 4:30 PM every day of the week except Monday, when it is closed. It is open for walk-in visits from July 1 to mid-October but is also open throughout the year by appointment with the resident curator. General admission is $10 and free for children under 12. The Museum also offers different levels of membership.

== Recognitions ==
In 1992, the Cottage was listed in the U.S. National Register of Historic Places. In 2016, the Cottage was added to the American Library Association’s Literary Landmarks Register.
