= Helen Hill Historic District =

Historic district in New York, United States

- U.S. National Register of Historic Places
- U.S. Historic district
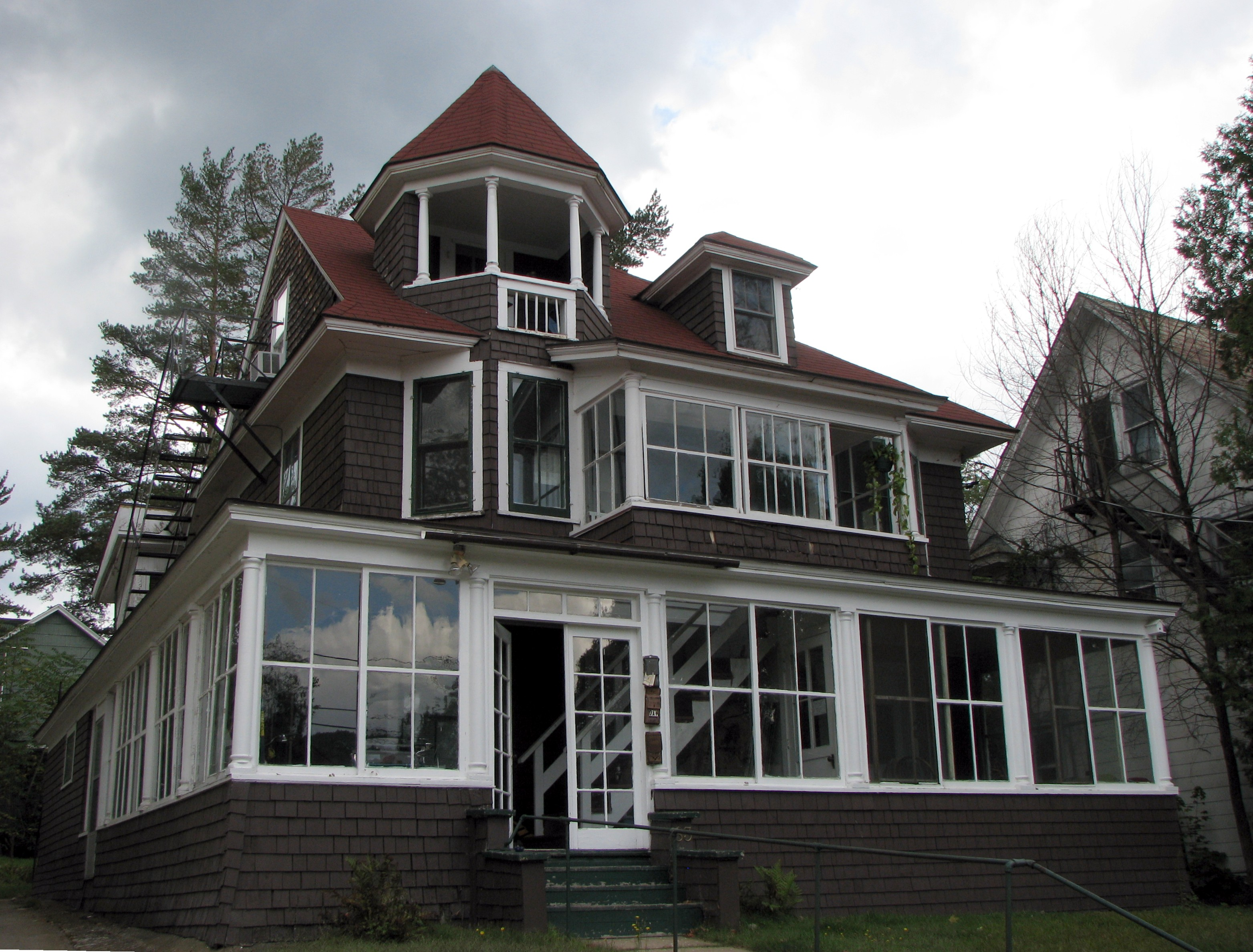
- Fallon Cottage Annex on Helen Hill

- Location within New York Location within the United States
- Location: Prescott Place, Helen & Front Sts., Sheppard, Franklin & Clinton Aves., Saranac Lake, New York
- Coordinates: 44°19′30″N 74°04′40″W
- Area: 19.31 acres (7.81 ha)
- Built: c. 1856-1954
- Architect: Coulter, William; Scopes & Feustmann
- Architectural style: Queen Anne, Colonial Revival, Tudor Revival, Bungalow/Craftsman
- NRHP reference No.: 15000754
- Added to NRHP: October 23, 2015

Helen Hill Historic District is a national historic district located at Saranac Lake, Essex County and Franklin County, New York. It encompasses 77 contributing buildings and 38 contributing structures in a predominantly residential section of Saranac Lake. It developed between about 1856 and 1954, and includes notable examples of Queen Anne, Colonial Revival, Tudor Revival, and Bungalow / American Craftsman style architecture. The district is characterized by many cottages retaining the "cure porches" that distinguished the area's early days as a sanitarium. Located in the district are the separately listed Bogie Cottage, Coulter Cottage, Fallon Cottage Annex, Hill Cottage, Hooey Cottage, Kennedy Cottage, Lent Cottage, Marvin Cottage, and Noyes Cottage. Other notable buildings include the Cure Cottage Museum (c. 1923) and Mary Prescott Reception Hospital (c. 1905).

It was added to the National Register of Historic Places in 2015.
