= Hooey Cottage =

Historic house in New York, United States

- U.S. National Register of Historic Places
- U.S. Historic district – Contributing property
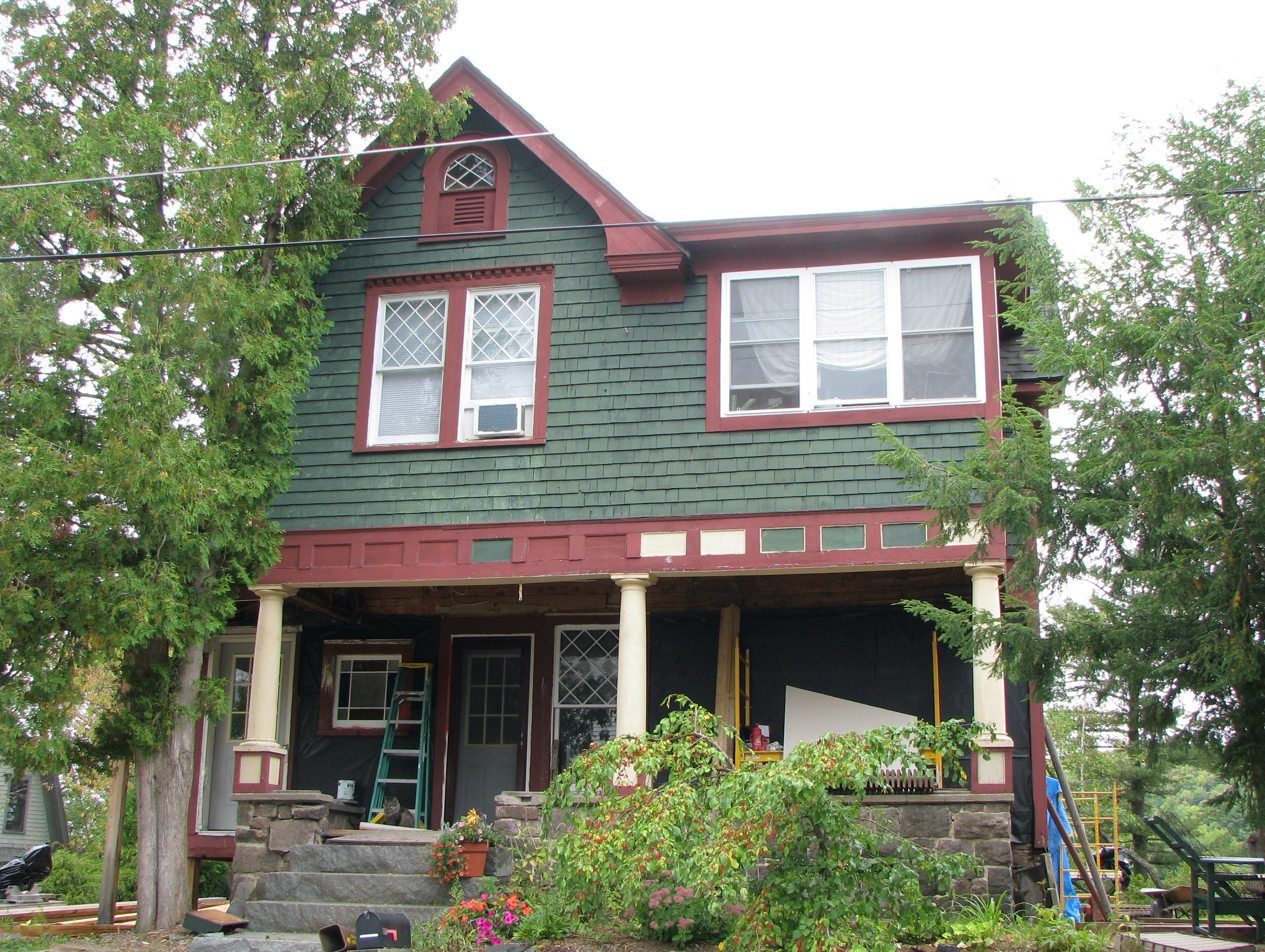
- Hooey Cottage, September 2008

- Location within New York Location within the United States
- Location: 24 Park Pl., Saranac Lake, Harrietstown, New York, U.S.
- Coordinates: 44°19′41″N 74°7′38″W
- Area: less than one acre
- Built: 1916
- MPS: Saranac Lake MPS
- NRHP reference No.: 92001429
- Added to NRHP: November 6, 1992

Hooey Cottage is a historic, cure cottage located at Saranac Lake in the town of Harrietstown, Franklin County, New York. It was built in 1916 and is a 2 1/2-story dwelling, two- by four-bay, wood frame residence with a cross-gabled roof on a fieldstone foundation. It features a 2-story cure porch.

It was listed on the National Register of Historic Places in 1992. It is located in the Helen Hill Historic District.
