= Fallon Cottage Annex =

Historic house in New York, United States

- U.S. National Register of Historic Places
- U.S. Historic district – Contributing property
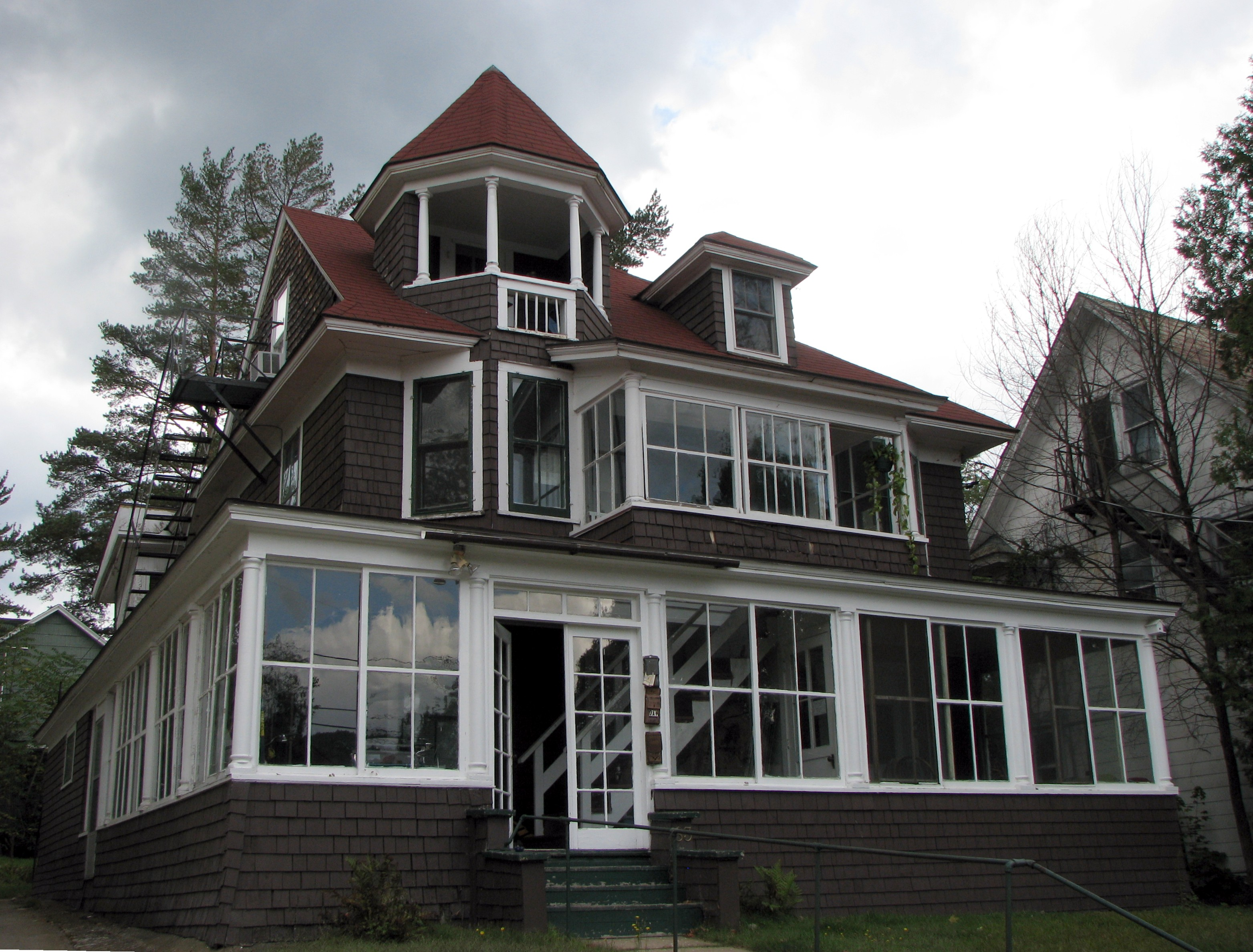
- Fallon Cottage Annex, September 2008

- Location within New York Location within the United States
- Location: 31 Franklin St., North Elba / Saranac Lake, New York
- Coordinates: 44°19′36″N 74°7′34″W
- Area: less than one acre
- Built: 1901
- Architectural style: Queen Anne
- MPS: Saranac Lake MPS
- NRHP reference No.: 92001463
- Added to NRHP: November 6, 1992

Fallon Cottage Annex is a historic cure cottage located at Saranac Lake, town of North Elba in Essex County, New York. It was built in 1901 and is a 2 1/2-story, shingled frame house on a coursed fieldstone foundation. It features a hipped roof with three cross gables, a small hipped roof dormer, and an octagonal turret or open cupola in the Queen Anne style. It has a ten-bay verandah, one-third of which is a separate cure porch. It was built as a single family residence and adapted for use as a cure cottage over time, operating as such after 1923.

It was listed on the National Register of Historic Places in 1992. It is located in the Helen Hill Historic District.
