= Saranac Lake, New York =

- Village
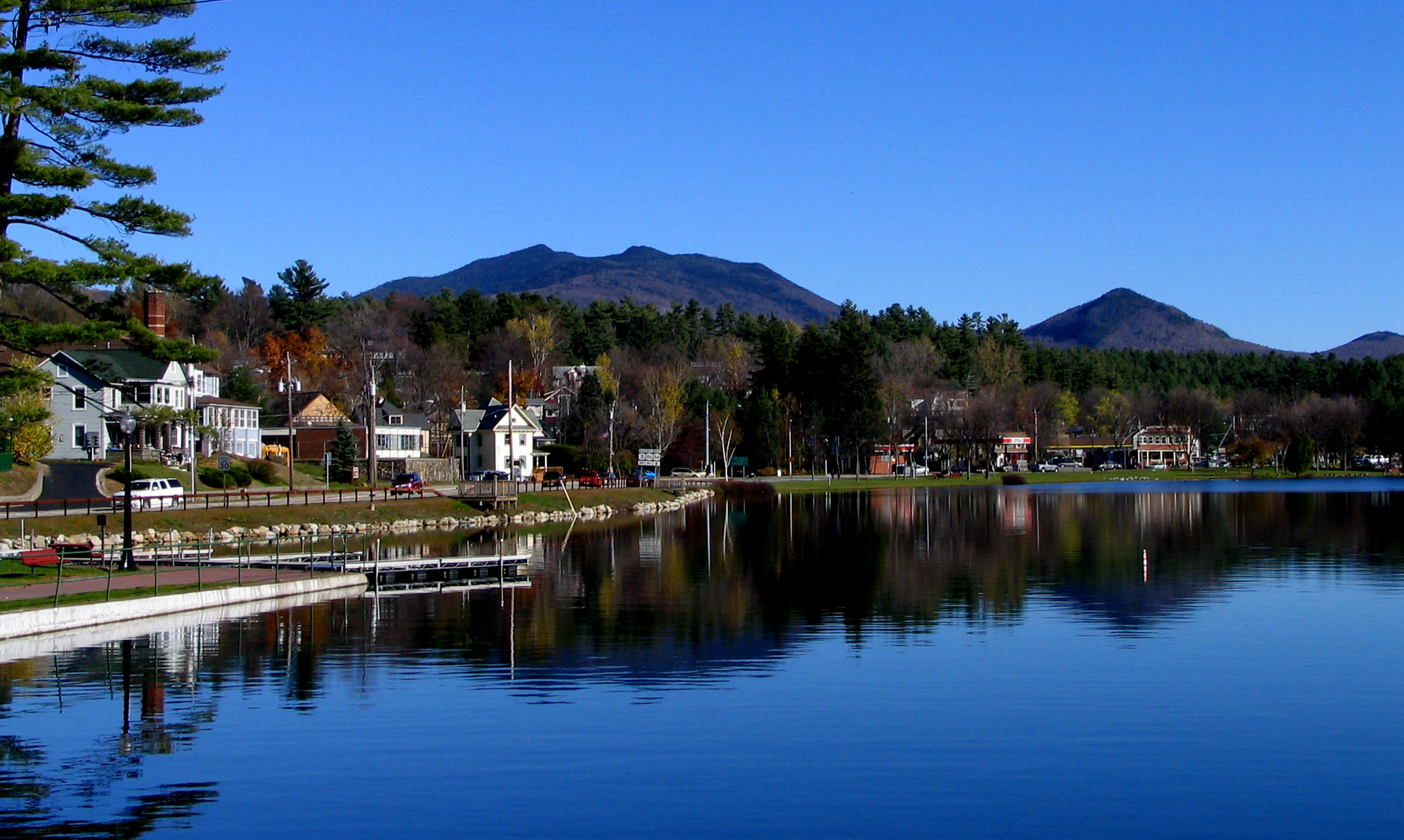
- Lake Flower, from Riverside Park
- Nickname: The Capital of the Adirondacks
- Interactive map of Saranac Lake, New York
- Location of the village of Saranac Lake in New York state
- Coordinates: 44°19′34″N 74°7′51″W
- Country: United States
- State: New York
- Counties: Franklin, Essex
- Towns: Harrietstown, North Elba, St. Armand

Government
  - Type: Mayor and Board of Trustees
  - Mayor: Kelly Brunette

Area
  - Total: 3.16 sq mi (8.18 km^{2})
  - Land: 2.91 sq mi (7.54 km^{2})
  - Water: 0.25 sq mi (0.64 km^{2})
- Elevation: 1,545 ft (471 m)

Population (2020)
  - Total: 4,887
  - Density: 1,678.9/sq mi (648.21/km^{2})
- Time zone: UTC−5 (Eastern (EST))
  - Summer (DST): UTC−4 (EDT)
- ZIP Code: 12983
- Area code: 518
- FIPS code: 36-65233
- GNIS feature ID: 0964482
- Website: www.saranaclakeny.gov

Saranac Lake is a village in the state of New York, United States. As of the 2020 census, the population was 4,887, making it the largest community by population in the Adirondack Park. The village of Saranac Lake covers parts of three towns (Harrietstown, St. Armand, and North Elba) and two counties (Franklin and Essex). The village is named after Upper, Middle and Lower Saranac lakes, which are nearby.

The county line is within two blocks of the center of the village. At the 2010 census, 3,897 village residents lived in Harrietstown, 1,367 lived in North Elba, and 142 lived in St. Armand. The village boundaries do not touch the shores of any of the three Saranac Lakes; Lower Saranac Lake, the nearest, is a half mile west of the village's downtown district. The northern reaches of Lake Flower, which is a wide part of the Saranac River downstream from the three Saranac Lakes, lie within the village. The town of Saranac is an entirely separate entity, 33 miles (53 km) down the Saranac River to the northeast.

The village lies within the boundaries of the Adirondack Park, 9 miles (14 km) west of Lake Placid. These two villages, along with nearby Tupper Lake, constitute what is known as the Tri-Lakes region.

== History ==
=== Iroquoi ===
This area was occupied by Iroquoian-speaking peoples for hundreds of years, and by other Indigenous peoples before them. The historic Mohawk people extended their hunting grounds to this area.

The area was first settled by European Americans in 1819, more than three decades after the American Revolutionary War. As the Iroquois, mostly allies of the British, had been forced to cede their land to the United States following the war, millions of acres of New York were opened up to non-Native development in the postwar period.

The Jacob Smith Moody family from Keene, New Hampshire, was the first to settle here. In 1827, settlers Pliny Miller and Alric Bushnell established a logging facility with a dam and sawmill, around which the village developed. The first school was built in 1838. In 1849, William F. Martin built one of the first hotels in the Adirondack Mountains. His Saranac Lake House, known simply as "Martin's", was located on the southeast shore of Lower Saranac Lake. Martin's soon became a favorite place for hunters, woodsmen, and socialites to meet and interact.

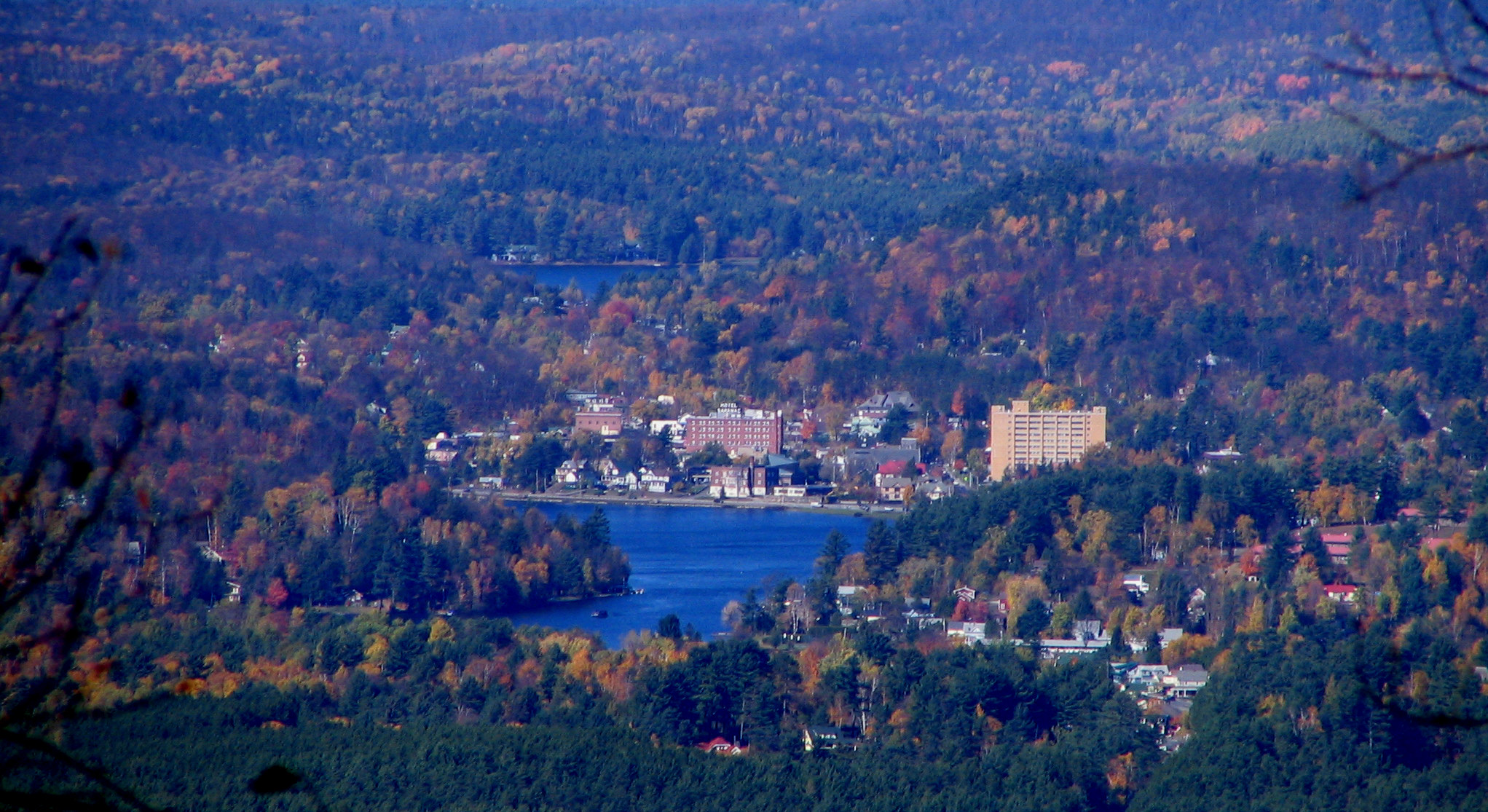
The village of Saranac Lake, with Lake Flower below and Lake Colby above, from Scarface Mountain to the Southeast.

=== Edward Livingston Trudeau ===
In 1876, Dr. Edward Livingston Trudeau arrived from New York City to treat his tuberculosis (TB) by a stay in the mountains. There was no medical treatment other than rest and nutrition at the time, and the disease was often fatal. Dry, cold air was considered to be good for patients, and sanitariums were also founded in European mountain resorts. Trudeau discovered that the fresh air and dry, alpine climate improved his health. In 1884, he founded his Adirondack Cottage Sanitarium, starting with a small cottage, called "Little Red". Two sisters from New York City who suffered from TB became the first patients. Little Red, the first "cure cottage", was built on a small patch of land on the north side of Mount Pisgah. The plot had been purchased for Trudeau by several of his hunting guides.

As more patients visited the region, including author Robert Louis Stevenson in 1887, Trudeau's fame grew. Soon, the sanitarium had grown to such size that it was entitled to its own post office, which delivered mail to the many patients. The Trudeau Institute, an independent medical research center, developed from Trudeau's work for the sanitarium. In 1964, the Trudeau Institute began researching the functions of the immune system and how it guards against many infectious diseases, including tuberculosis.

=== Railroad, Telephone ===
Telephone service was introduced in 1884, and the Chateaugay branch of the Delaware and Hudson Railroad reached Saranac Lake from Plattsburgh in 1887. Five years later, the Mohawk and Malone Railway main line reached nearby Lake Clear Junction. The New York Central and Hudson River Railroad purchased it in 1894, and it was merged into the New York Central Railroad in 1913. The NYC became the leading railroad from New York City, via Utica, into the northern Adirondacks, and its Lake Clear Junction-Saranac Lake-Lake Placid Branch was a key traffic source until NYC passenger service ended on April 24, 1965. Railroads both carried passenger traffic to the growing resort areas of the Adirondacks and shipped out the millions of feet of lumber that were harvested from this area into the early 20th century.

The village was incorporated on June 16, 1892, and Dr. Trudeau was elected the first village president soon thereafter. Electricity was introduced on September 20, 1894, by installing water wheels on the former site of Pliny Miller's mill. Paul Smith purchased the Saranac Lake Electricity Co. in 1907, and formed the Paul Smith's Electric Light and Power and Railroad Company. It eventually became part of Niagara-Mohawk. At the same time, the village began to develop municipal facilities, such as public schools, and fire and police departments.

In 1892, John Rudolphus Booth, the Canadian lumber king, rented a cottage at Saranac Lake for his daughter, who used it for several years in seeking a TB cure. Booth brought skis with him, and introduced the sport of skiing to the area.

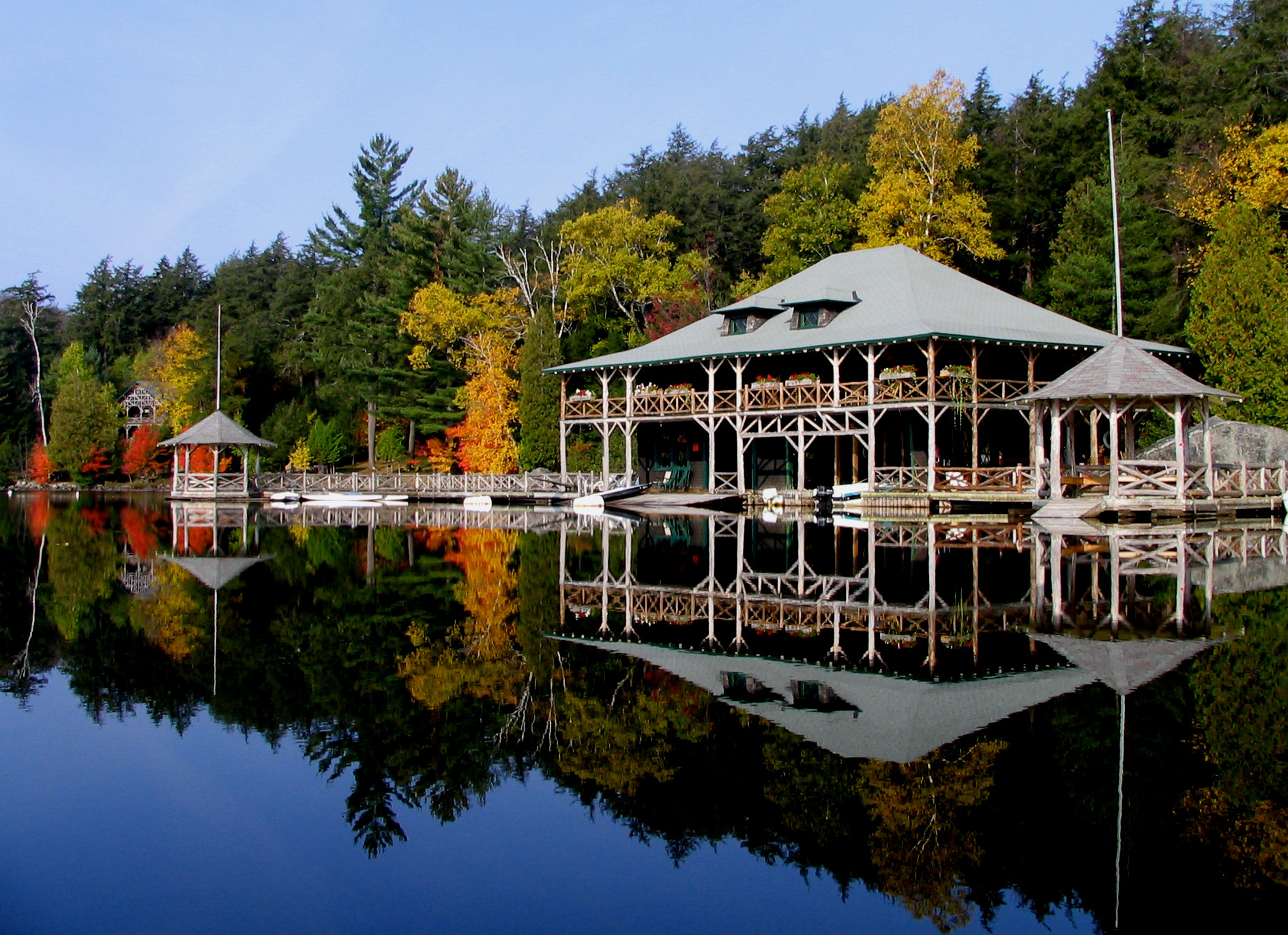
Knollwood Club on Lower Saranac Lake, home of George Marshall

Starting in the 1890s and for the next 60 years, Saranac Lake was known as "the Western Hemisphere's foremost center for the treatment of pulmonary tuberculosis". An effective antibiotic was first used on human TB patients in 1921, but only after World War II did it begin to be widely used in the US. In the postwar period, sanatorium treatment became less important and was phased out completely by 1954. Among the last of the prominent patients who sought treatment for tuberculosis was Manuel Luis Quezon y Molina, the first Filipino president of the Commonwealth of the Philippines, who died in Saranac Lake of the disease on August 1, 1944.

But the village had become a center of tuberculosis care, attracting many doctors and patients from around the world. They added to and supported the culture of the area, as did the wealthy who built Great Camps on the nearby Saranac and Saint Regis Lakes, the effect was to change the sleepy village of 300 of the 1880s into the vibrant "little city" of 8,000.

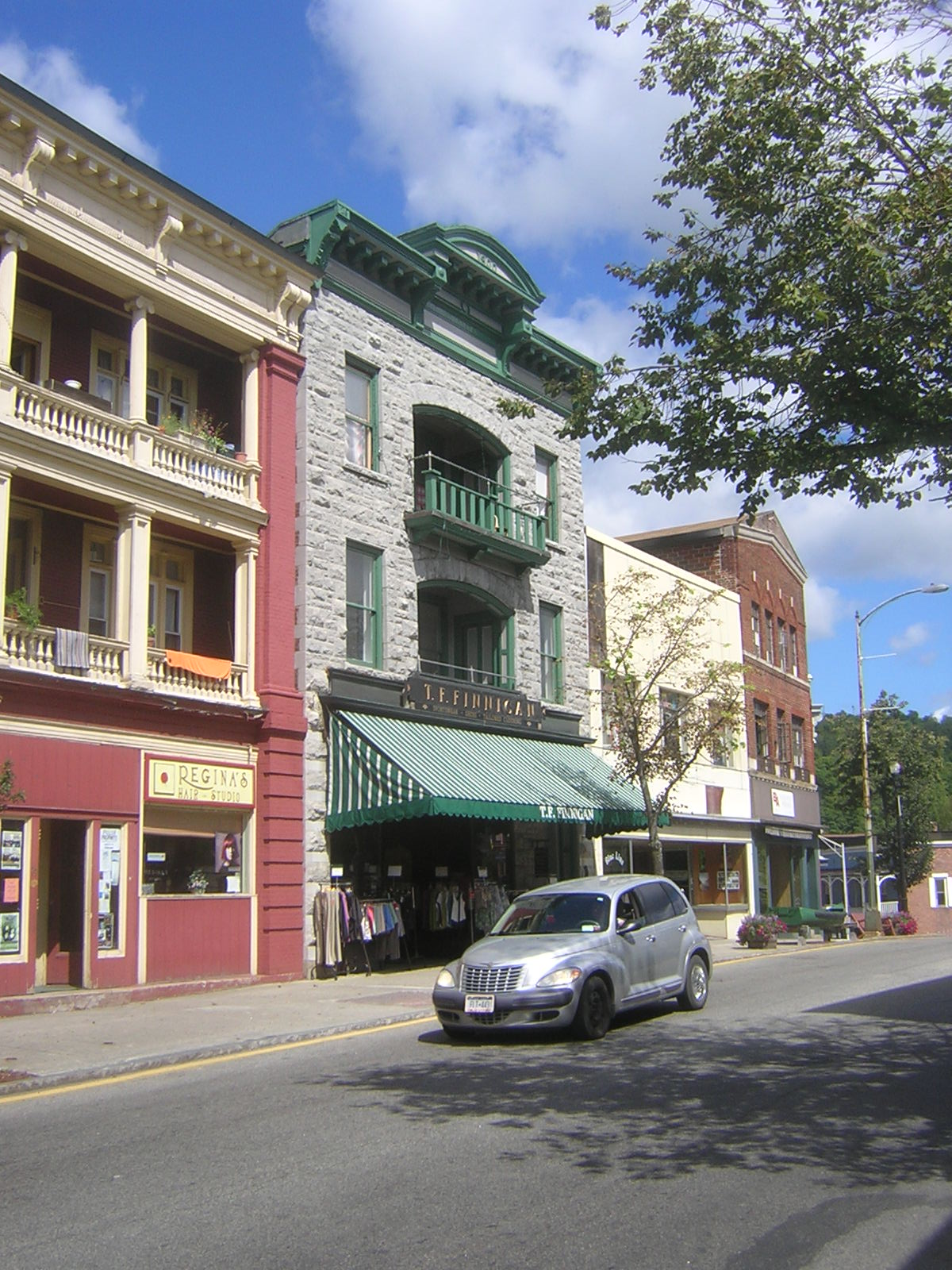
Like the cure cottages, downtown buildings included porches for tuberculosis patients.

=== William S. Fowler ===
William S. Fowler was a real estate speculator and developer who owned several properties around Saranac Lake. One was a large property just outside the town on top of a hill. He named it "Spion Kop" in honor of a battle that was fought in the Boer War in South Africa. In commemoration, he placed miniature cannons on various parts of the property.

Several buildings were erected as cottages where people could "cure" from TB. In 1919, Fowler sold the property to the Northwestern Fire Insurance Company. They turned it into a private sanatorium for their employees.

=== National Vaudeville Artists ===
In 1925, the sanatorium was sold to the National Vaudeville Artists. Around this time there were numerous vaudeville performers in Saranac Lake seeking cures at different locations. E. F. Albee, the owner and President of the National Vaudeville Artists, held benefit programs in New York City to raise funds to construct the large sanitarium. The older cure cottages were torn down and some were moved. By the end of the 1920s the Tudor Building was completed. It still stands today.

In the 1930s the National Vaudeville Artists no longer existed. After World War II antibiotics were used to treat TB, and the mountain sanitariums were converted to other uses.

=== Will Rogers Memorial Hospital ===
The Tudor Building was purchased by the Will Rogers Memorial Commission. In 1936, one year after Rogers' death, they renamed this building as the Will Rogers Memorial Hospital. A laboratory was built in later years and named the O'Donnell Memorial Laboratory in honor of R.J. O'Donnell, a well-known theater chain manager.

In the 1970s, New York State forced the closure of the hospital, as it did not meet contemporary codes and updating was cost-prohibitive. The Will Rogers building was adapted for other uses. It was operated as a night club, then as a timeshare vacation spot, and finally as apartments. Unable to attract enough renters, the owners abandoned the property, which deteriorated. In 1980, it was renovated for use as the press headquarters for the Winter Olympics. In 1995, the Kaplan Development Group purchased the property for adaptation as a retirement home for senior residents. It planned to restore the building's historic details.

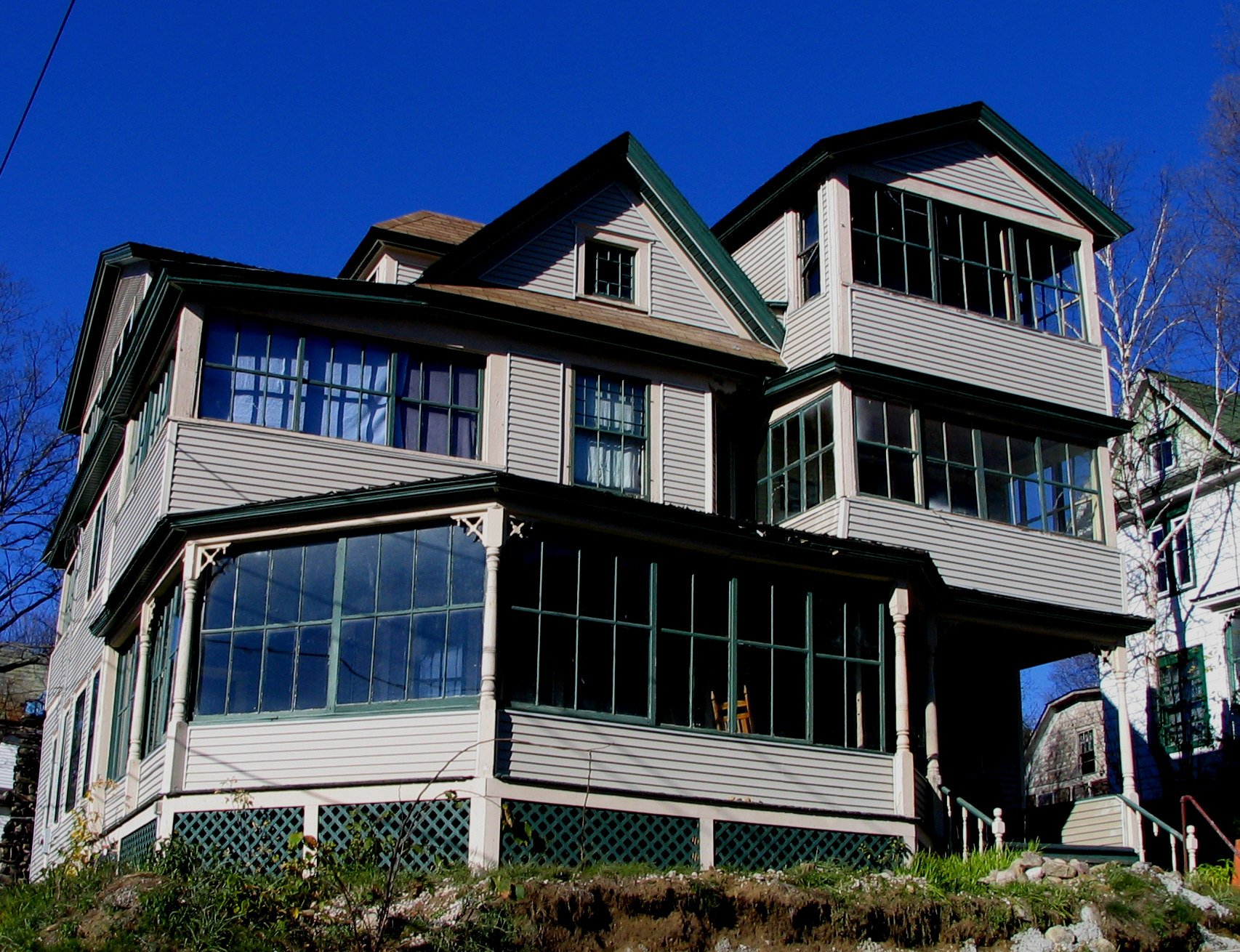
A tuberculosis "Cure Cottage"

Author Mark Twain vacationed on Lake Flower in 1901 at the height of his fame. While there, he wrote a Conan Doyle spoof, "A Double-Barreled Detective Story".

After multiple fires destroyed a large part of downtown, Saranac Lake rebuilt in the 1920s. The Hotel Saranac was built in the Art Deco style and still stands. Other permanent buildings were added to the townscape. During the Prohibition era, rum-running was common in the village, as smugglers brought liquor from over the border from Canada. Gangster Legs Diamond visited his brother Eddy, who had TB and stayed at a local cottage sanatorium. During the 1920s, entertainer Al Jolson and president Calvin Coolidge were semi-frequent visitors to the village; Jolson once performed a solo for three hours at the Pontiac Theater on Broadway.

Beginning in 1936, physicist Albert Einstein had a summer home in Saranac Lake, renting the cottage of local architect William L. Distin; he often sailed with his wife on Lake Flower. During World War II, Einstein summered frequently at Knollwood Club on Lower Saranac Lake. He heard with others from the radio that on August 6, 1945, the atom bomb had been dropped on Hiroshima. A few days later, Einstein gave his first interview about this event at Knollwood.

In 1954, Saranac Lake hosted the world premiere of the Biblical epic film The Silver Chalice, in which actor Paul Newman made his debut. Several of the stars, including Virginia Mayo, visited the village and participated in the winter carnival parade.

Since the late 20th century, Saranac Lake has become a more conventional tourist destination. New York's former governor, Andrew Cuomo, has visited there ever since he was a teenager and regularly vacations there with his family. The Hotel Saranac is a memorable early 20th century Art Deco structure. The former sanatorium is now used as the corporate call center for the American Management Association.

Numerous properties are listed on the National Register of Historic Places: the Dr. A. H. Allen Cottage, Berkeley Square Historic District, Bogie Cottage, Peyton Clark Cottage, Coulter Cottage, Cure Cottage at 43 Forest Hill Avenue, Denny Cottage, Fallon Cottage Annex, Freer Cottage, Hathaway Cottage, Helen Hill Historic District, Highland Park Historic District, Hill Cottage, The Homestead, Kennedy Cottage, Lane Cottage, Larom Cottage, Dr. Henry Leetch House, Lent Cottage, Little Red, Marquay Cottage, Marvin Cottage, Musselman Cottage, New York Central Railroad Adirondack Division Historic District, Partridge Cottage, Pittenger Cottage, Pomeroy Cottage, Will Rogers Memorial Hospital, Orin Savage Cottage, Paul Smith's Electric Light and Power and Railroad Company Complex, Prospect Point Camp, Stevenson Cottage, Stuckman Cottage, Trudeau Sanatorium, Chester Valentine House, Wilson Cottage, and Witherspoon Cottage.

186 buildings in the village are listed on the National Register of Historic Places.

== Culture ==
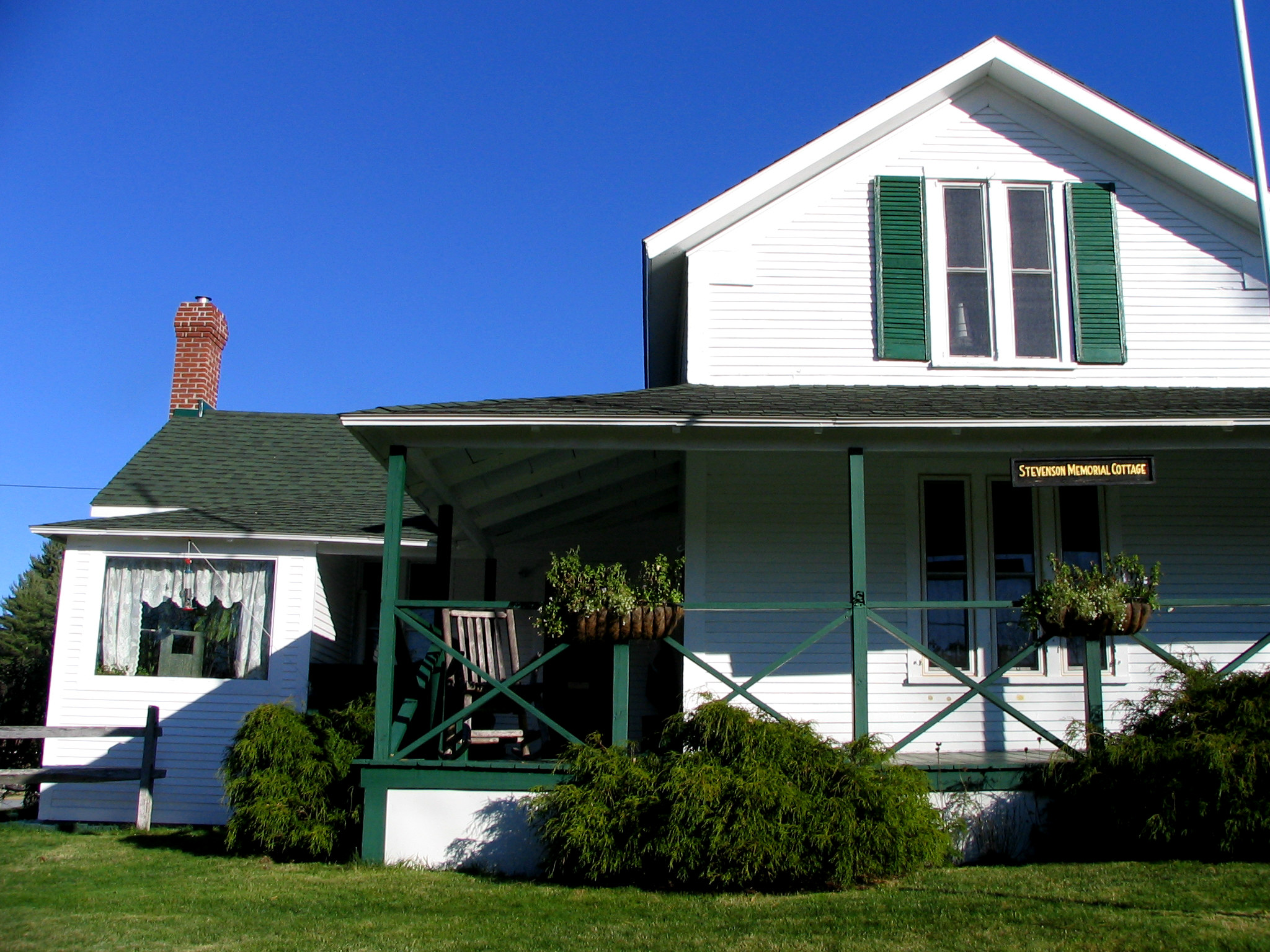
Robert Louis Stevenson's Cure Cottage

Many tourists come to the village, which is picturesque owing to its setting and the preservation of older architecture. Much of the village fronts on Lake Flower, which was created by a dam in the Saranac River and named after Governor Roswell P. Flower.

There are opportunities for canoeing and boating, hiking and climbing. In the summer, the Village of Saranac Lake offers free concerts in Riverside Park on Lake Flower and the Berkeley Green park. Camping is also a popular pastime in the Saranac Lake region.

Doonesbury 2005

Cross-country and downhill skiing, snowshoeing, ice skating, snowmobiling are winter activities. There is also an annual 10-day winter carnival, an event held in celebration of winter since 1897. Each year the carnival is given a theme - 2016's theme was "Adirondack Wildlife". The Winter Carnival parade reflects the theme, and Garry Trudeau, the creator of the comic strip Doonesbury who grew up in the town, creates artwork with characters from his comic strip doing things related to the theme for a button that can be purchased each winter. The carnival's main attraction is the ice palace, which is made with blocks of ice taken from Lake Flower and illuminated with colored lights, along with various winter activities and competitions. These include a parade, which normally has several bagpipe and drum marching bands and the Lawn Chair Ladies, along with more usual floats and local school bands. Each year a Winter Carnival King and Queen, who preside over carnival activities, are selected from village residents based upon their contribution to Saranac Lake, while the prince and princess are from the two local colleges, North Country Community College and Paul Smith's College. There is also a winter rugby game.

A non-profit Village Improvement Society, dating from 1910, currently owns and maintains eight parks. The parkland along the lakefront, now owned by the village, is the result of the Society's earlier efforts.

Every year the Can Am Rugby Tournament, the largest such tournament in the Western Hemisphere, is held in the village.

Saranac Lake has a number of galleries, the Adirondacks' only year-round, professional theatre, monthly art walks June through September, and a Plein Air festival. The organization Saranac Lake ArtWorks is composed of dozens of artists and arts-related businesses. Historic Saranac Lake is an architectural heritage organization that has nominated almost two hundred properties to the National Register of Historic Places. The organization has completed the restoration of Edward Livingston Trudeau's 1894 Saranac Laboratory, now a museum, and the 1904 Union Depot.

The Adirondack Carousel is an enclosed carousel in which the ride's figures are all Adirondack wildlife – whitetail deer, moose, loon, bobcat, trout, otter and a black fly — all carved or painted by local artists.

Filmmaker Fred G. Sullivan, a resident of Saranac Lake, depicted the town and many of its inhabitants with affectionate mockery in his film The Beer-Drinker's Guide to Fitness and Filmmaking.

=== Artists' residences ===
The composer Béla Bartók spent summers in Saranac Lake and wrote some of his best-known works there.

The writer Robert Louis Stevenson spent the winter of 1887 in a cottage in Saranac Lake, which still stands, and serves as a museum dedicated to his life.

The cartoonist Garry Trudeau, who draws the Doonesbury comic strip, was raised in Saranac Lake and has maintained his connections there. He is the great-grandson of Edward Trudeau, described above.

Stuntwoman Leslie Hoffman was born in Saranac Lake and came back to home to retire from the Entertainment Business.

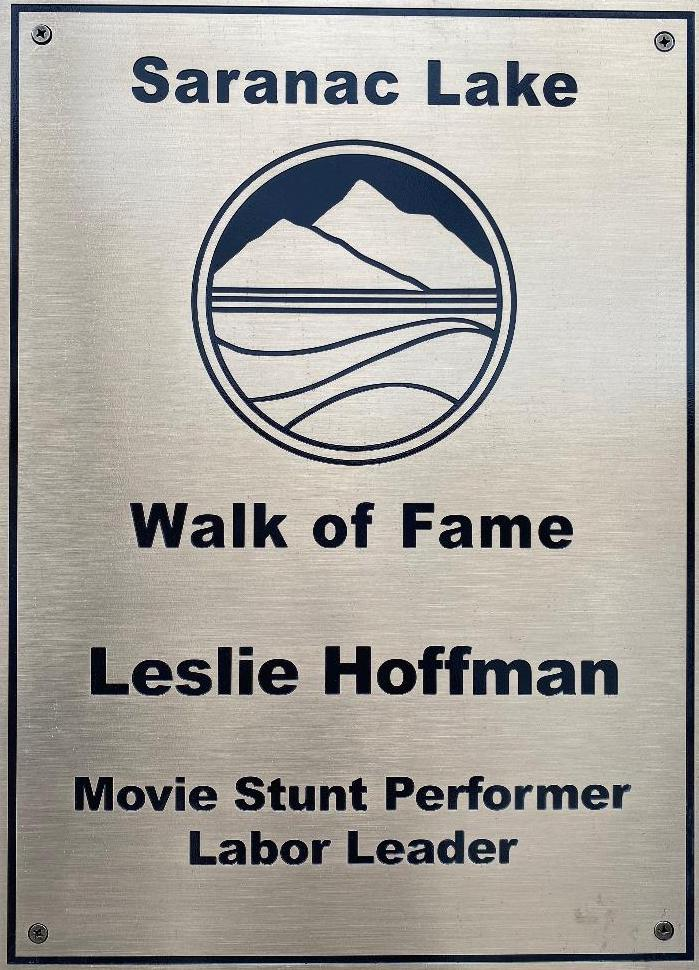
Leslie Hoffman Plaque on the Saranac Lake Walk of Fame

== Economy ==
After the local Ames Department Store closed due to bankruptcy and residents were forced to travel 50 miles to Plattsburgh for many consumer goods, the town was approached by Walmart, which offered to build a 120,000 square foot supercenter, but the community declined the offer, fearing that Walmart would negatively impact local business and increase traffic. As an alternative, a community-owned store was organized and shares were sold to community residents. $500,000 was raised by about 600 residents, who made the goal of an average investment of $800. The store, Saranac Lake Community Store, opened on October 29, 2011, in remodeled facilities in downtown Saranac Lake.

== Transportation ==
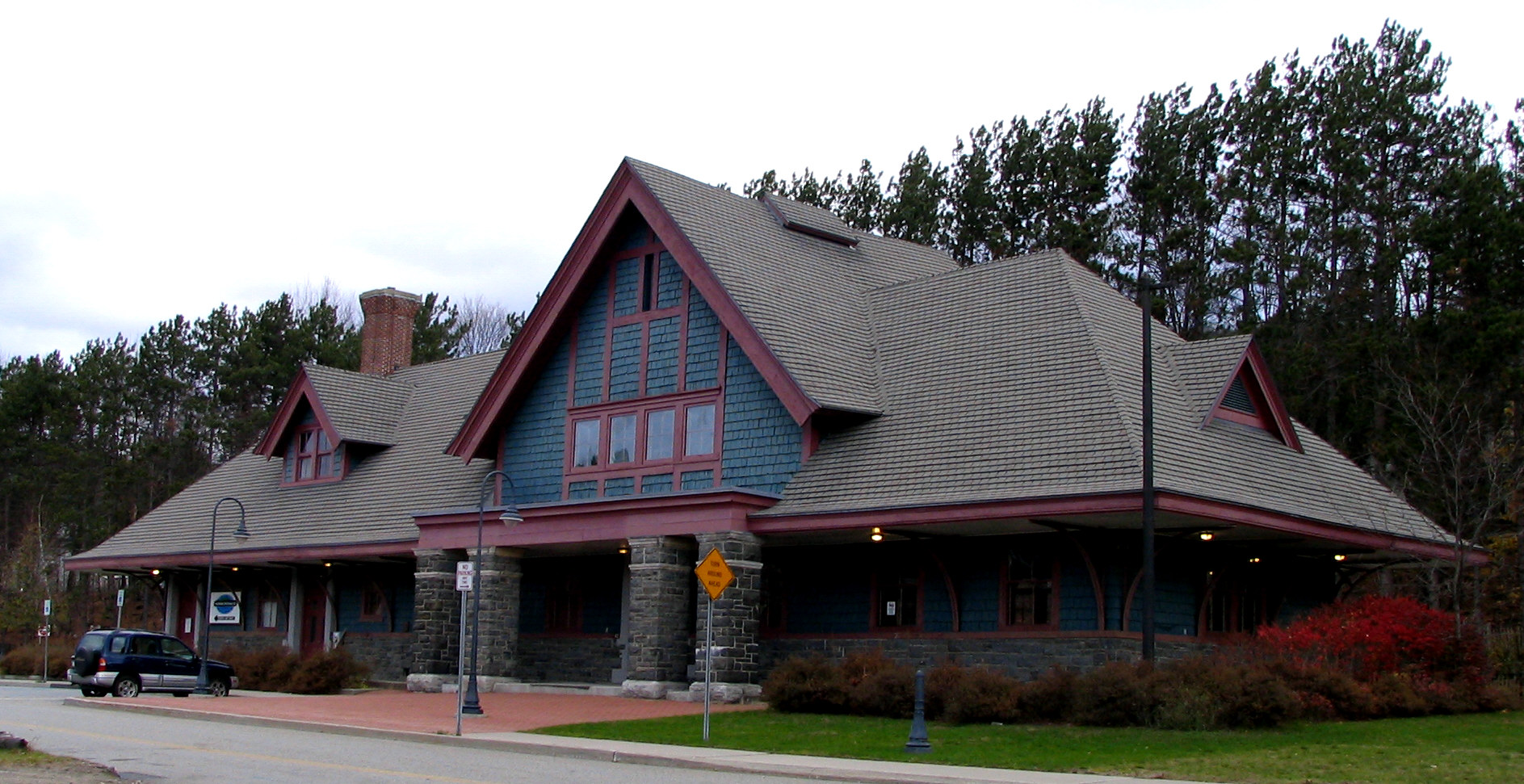
Adirondack Scenic Railway Station

- The Adirondack Regional Airport (SLK) is 7.3 miles (11.7 km) northwest of the village, offering daily commercial flights to New York City and Boston, along with general aviation services.
- Adirondack Trailways serves Saranac Lake, and is part of the Greyhound Lines bus system.
- There is also local bus service from Franklin County Public Transportation and local taxi services.

== Geography ==
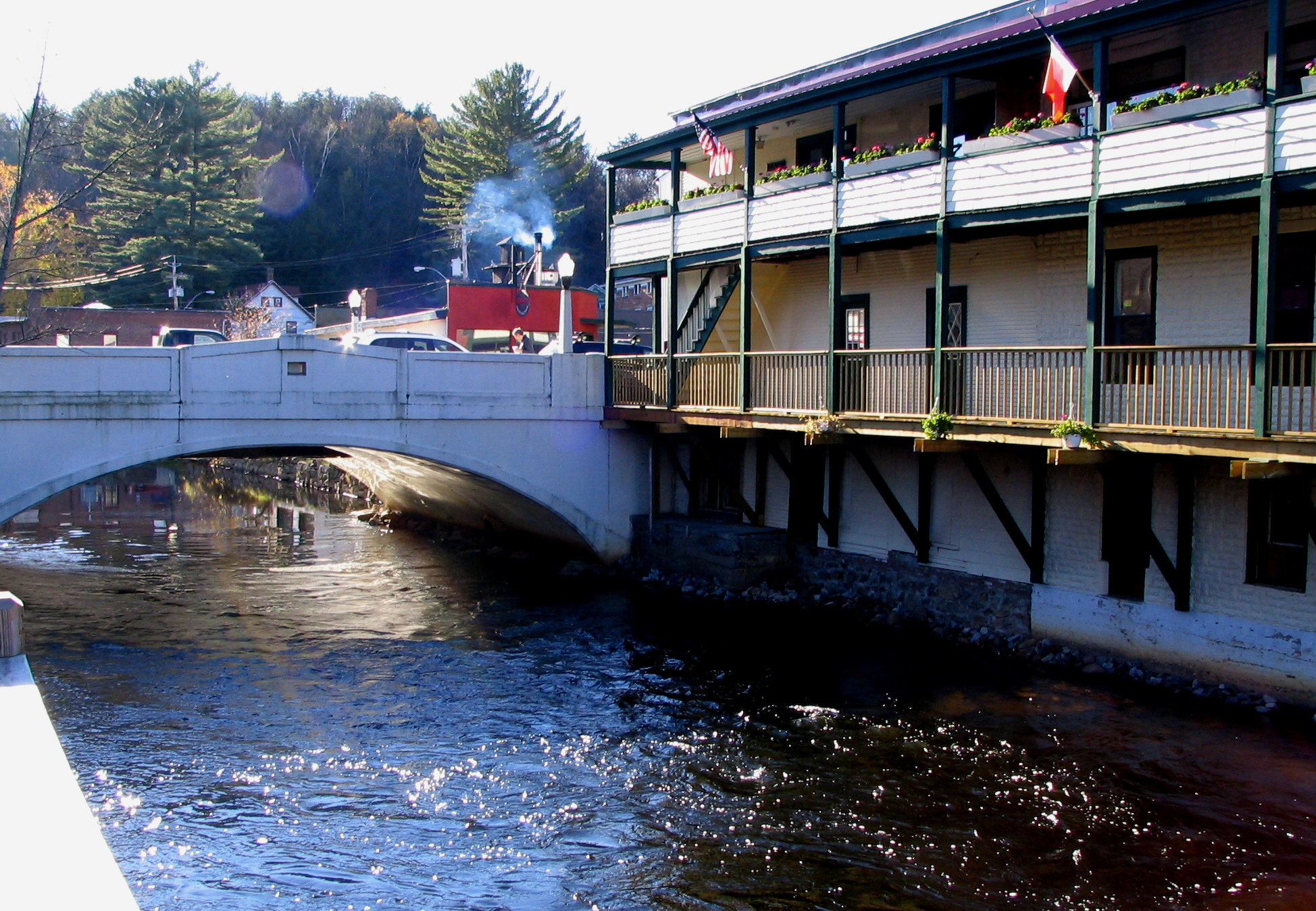
The Saranac River runs through the village.

Saranac Lake is located at 44°19′34″N 74°7′51″W (44.325988, −74.130944).

According to the United States Census Bureau, the village has a total area of 3.0 square miles (7.8 km^{2}), of which 2.8 square miles (7.2 km^{2}) is land and 0.23 square miles (0.6 km^{2}), or 8.21%, is water.

The village is located at the junction of the towns of North Elba and St. Armand in Essex County, and Harrietstown in Franklin County.

The village is at the intersection of New York State Route 3 and New York State Route 86. Essex County Road 33 enters the village from the southeast, Franklin County Road 47 joins NY-86 immediately north of the village, and Franklin County Road 18 connects from Ampersand Avenue on the northern edge of the village to New York State Route 30 near Saranac Inn, New York.

The closest major metropolitan city is Montreal, Quebec, Canada, 103 miles (166 km) to the north. Plattsburgh is 50 miles (80 km) to the northeast, Burlington, Vermont, is 69 miles (111 km) by road to the east and Albany is 148 miles (238 km) to the south.

== Demographics ==
Historical population
Census	Pop.	Note	%±
1880	191		—
1890	768		302.1%
1900	2,594		237.8%
1910	4,983		92.1%
1920	5,174		3.8%
1930	8,020		55.0%
1940	7,138		−11.0%
1950	6,913		−3.2%
1960	6,421		−7.1%
1970	6,086		−5.2%
1980	5,578		−8.3%
1990	5,377		−3.6%
2000	5,041		−6.2%
2010	5,406		7.2%
2020	4,887		−9.6%
U.S. Decennial Census

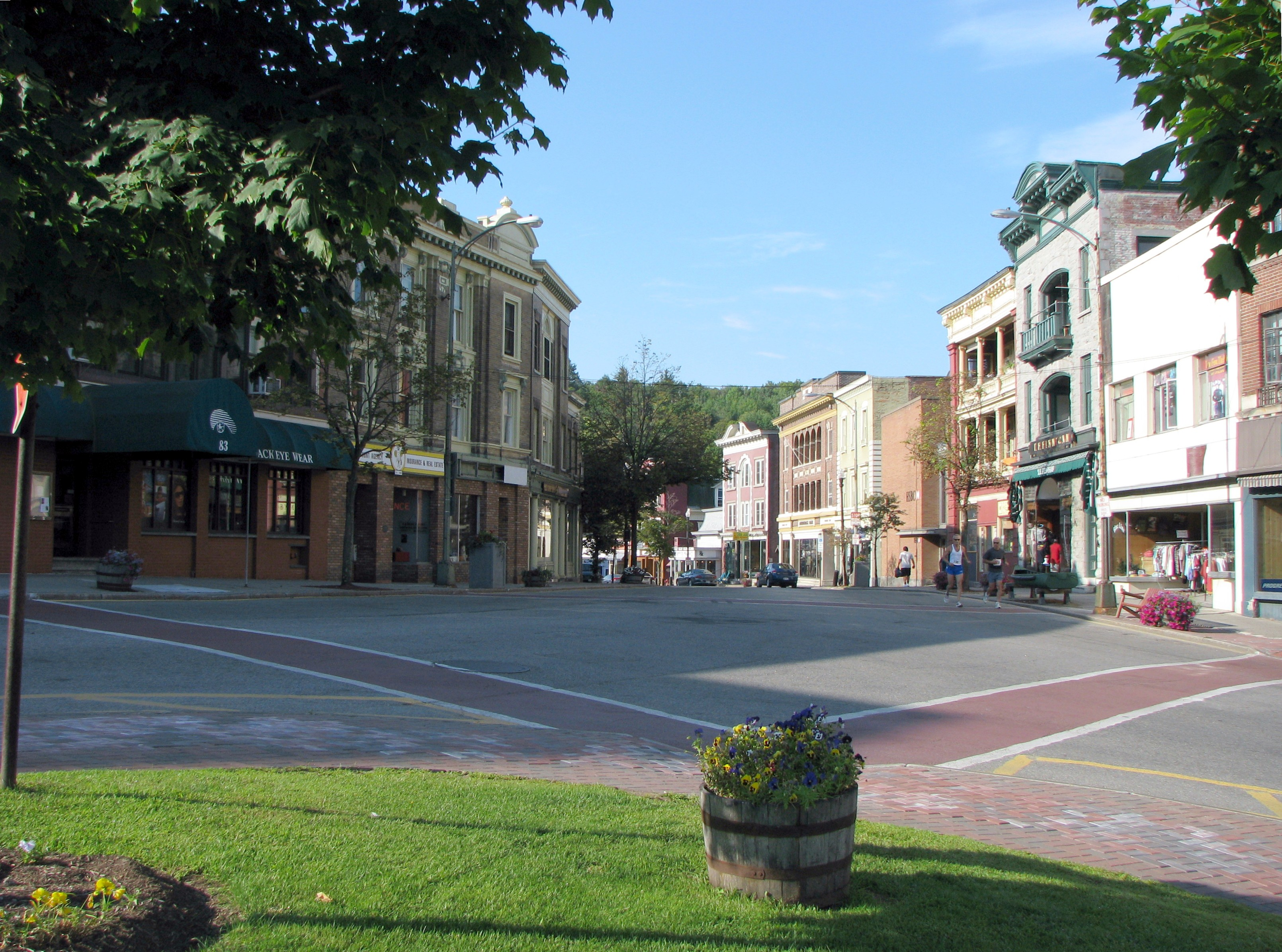
Broadway, with Main St. at left

=== 2020 census ===
As of the 2020 census, Saranac Lake had a population of 4,887. The median age was 41.5 years. 17.5% of residents were under the age of 18 and 17.9% of residents were 65 years of age or older. For every 100 females there were 100.8 males, and for every 100 females age 18 and over there were 98.2 males age 18 and over.

98.0% of residents lived in urban areas, while 2.0% lived in rural areas.

There were 2,417 households in Saranac Lake, of which 20.4% had children under the age of 18 living in them. Of all households, 30.6% were married-couple households, 27.4% were households with a male householder and no spouse or partner present, and 31.4% were households with a female householder and no spouse or partner present. About 45.6% of all households were made up of individuals and 16.2% had someone living alone who was 65 years of age or older.

There were 2,913 housing units, of which 17.0% were vacant. The homeowner vacancy rate was 2.7% and the rental vacancy rate was 11.2%.

Racial composition as of the 2020 census
Race	Number	Percent
White	4,388	89.8%
Black or African American	63	1.3%
American Indian and Alaska Native	19	0.4%
Asian	33	0.7%
Native Hawaiian and Other Pacific Islander	0	0.0%
Some other race	38	0.8%
Two or more races	346	7.1%
Hispanic or Latino (of any race)	127	2.6%

=== 2000 census ===
As of the census of 2000, there were 5,041 people, 2,369 households, and 1,182 families residing in the village. The population density was 1,812.0 inhabitants per square mile (699.6/km^{2}). There were 2,854 housing units at an average density of 1,025.9 units per square mile (396.1 units/km^{2}). The racial makeup of the village was 96.87% White, 0.75% African American, 0.32% Native American, 0.48% Asian, 0.26% from other races, and 1.33% from two or more races. Hispanic or Latino of any race were 1.07% of the population.

There were 2,369 households, out of which 25.4% had children under the age of 18 living with them, 35.2% were married couples living together, 10.3% had a female householder with no husband present, and 50.1% were non-families. 40.7% of all households were made up of individuals, and 14.7% had someone living alone who was 65 years of age or older. The average household size was 2.09 and the average family size was 2.88.

In the village, the population was spread out, with 22.2% under the age of 18, 11.4% from 18 to 24, 28.3% from 25 to 44, 23.1% from 45 to 64, and 15.0% who were 65 years of age or older. The median age was 38 years. For every 100 females, there were 93.4 males. For every 100 females age 18 and over, there were 90.8 males.

The median income for a household in the village was $29,754, and the median income for a family was $42,153. Males had a median income of $32,188 versus $24,759 for females. The per capita income for the village was $17,590. About 8.5% of families and 13.8% of the population were below the poverty line, including 11.5% of those under age 18 and 17.6% of those age 65 or over.

== Sister cities ==
Saranac Lake has two sister cities:

- Entrains-sur-Nohain, France
- Sainte-Agathe-des-Monts, Quebec, Canada

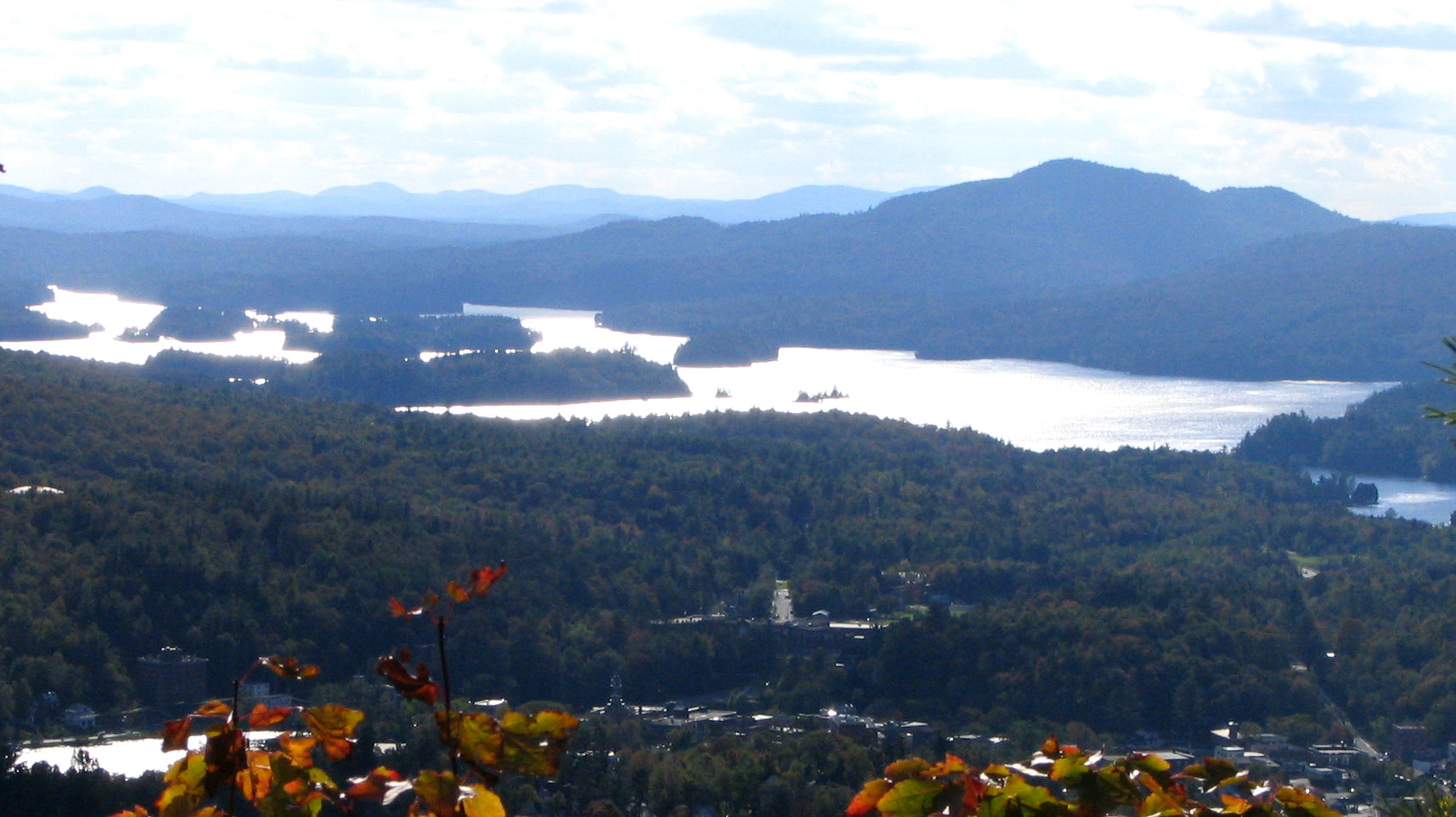
The village of Saranac Lake, bottom, with Lower Saranac Lake, above, from Baker Mountain, to the East. Lake Flower is at lower left.

== Climate ==
According to the Köppen climate classification system, Saranac Lake has a warm-summer, humid continental climate (Dfb). Dfb climates are characterized by at least one month having an average mean temperature ≤ 32.0 °F (0.0 °C), at least four months with an average mean temperature ≥ 50.0 °F (10.0 °C), all months with an average mean temperature < 71.6 °F (22.0 °C) and no significant precipitation difference between seasons. Although most summer days are comfortably humid in Saranac Lake, episodes of heat and high humidity can occur, with heat index values > 89 °F (32 °C). Since 1981, the highest air temperature was 94.7 °F (34.8 °C) on August 3, 1988, and the highest daily average mean dew point was 70.7 °F (21.5 °C) on August 1, 2006. Since 1981, the wettest calendar day was 3.92 inches (100 mm) on November 8, 1996. During the winter months, the average annual extreme minimum air temperature is −28.8 °F (−33.8 °C). Since 1981, the coldest air temperature was −34.9 °F (−37.2 °C) on January 16, 1994. Episodes of extreme cold and wind can occur, with wind chill values less than −43 °F (−42 °C). The average annual snowfall total (October—May) is between 100 and 125 inches (254 and 318 cm). While Old Forge and Stillwater Reservoir in the southwestern Adirondacks hold the state record cold temperature at −52 °F (−47 °C), Saranac Lake is considered the coldest town in the state overall.

Climate data for Saranac Lake Airport, New York (1,663 ft or 507 m AMSL), 1991–2020 normals, (Note: Mean monthly maxima and minima (i.e. the highest and lowest temperature readings during an entire month or year) calculated based on data at said location from 1981 to 2010. In years with more than five missing daily values annually but with no single month exceeding five missing daily values, the annual extreme value derives from the most extreme monthly value.) extremes 1903–present (Note: Records maintained at Saranac Lake Airport since June 1998, at Ray Brook from April 1978 to May 1998 inclusive, and alternating between Paul Smiths and Gabriels before then.)
Month	Jan	Feb	Mar	Apr	May	Jun	Jul	Aug	Sep	Oct	Nov	Dec	Year
Record high °F (°C)	62 (17)	65 (18)	79 (26)	89 (32)	94 (34)	101 (38)	99 (37)	97 (36)	92 (33)	86 (30)	75 (24)	64 (18)	101 (38)
Mean maximum °F (°C)	49.0 (9.4)	48.7 (9.3)	58.2 (14.6)	74.6 (23.7)	83.8 (28.8)	86.7 (30.4)	87.3 (30.7)	86.0 (30.0)	83.3 (28.5)	74.7 (23.7)	62.5 (16.9)	51.3 (10.7)	89.3 (31.8)
Mean daily maximum °F (°C)	24.9 (−3.9)	27.6 (−2.4)	36.5 (2.5)	50.3 (10.2)	64.4 (18.0)	72.4 (22.4)	76.6 (24.8)	74.7 (23.7)	67.9 (19.9)	54.3 (12.4)	41.7 (5.4)	30.2 (−1.0)	51.8 (11.0)
Daily mean °F (°C)	13.6 (−10.2)	15.3 (−9.3)	24.1 (−4.4)	38.2 (3.4)	50.5 (10.3)	59.4 (15.2)	63.6 (17.6)	61.7 (16.5)	54.4 (12.4)	43.3 (6.3)	31.9 (−0.1)	20.7 (−6.3)	39.7 (4.3)
Mean daily minimum °F (°C)	2.3 (−16.5)	2.9 (−16.2)	11.6 (−11.3)	26.0 (−3.3)	36.5 (2.5)	46.3 (7.9)	50.7 (10.4)	48.7 (9.3)	41.0 (5.0)	32.3 (0.2)	22.1 (−5.5)	11.2 (−11.6)	27.6 (−2.4)
Mean minimum °F (°C)	−25.4 (−31.9)	−22.5 (−30.3)	−14.5 (−25.8)	9.7 (−12.4)	22.5 (−5.3)	31.7 (−0.2)	38.6 (3.7)	35.4 (1.9)	25.9 (−3.4)	17.6 (−8.0)	0.6 (−17.4)	−15.2 (−26.2)	−28.8 (−33.8)
Record low °F (°C)	−46 (−43)	−44 (−42)	−35 (−37)	−10 (−23)	10 (−12)	22 (−6)	29 (−2)	27 (−3)	15 (−9)	2 (−17)	−21 (−29)	−46 (−43)	−46 (−43)
Average precipitation inches (mm)	1.94 (49)	1.50 (38)	2.04 (52)	3.09 (78)	3.70 (94)	4.36 (111)	4.06 (103)	3.56 (90)	3.47 (88)	3.85 (98)	2.84 (72)	2.20 (56)	36.61 (929)
Average snowfall inches (cm)	25.2 (64)	22.9 (58)	19.6 (50)	9.0 (23)	1.2 (3.0)	0.0 (0.0)	0.0 (0.0)	0.0 (0.0)	0.1 (0.25)	1.9 (4.8)	14.5 (37)	24.7 (63)	119.1 (303.05)
Average precipitation days (≥ 0.01 in)	14.4	13.0	14.0	15.6	15.3	16.6	15.9	16.5	13.1	16.4	15.9	17.6	184.3
Average snowy days (≥ 0.1 in)	13.8	12.0	9.6	4.7	0.7	0.0	0.0	0.0	0.1	1.4	7.7	13.2	63.2
Source 1: NOAA
Source 2: National Weather Service (snow/snow days/snow depth 1903–1998)

== Education ==
It is in the Saranac Lake Central School District.

== Ecology ==
According to the A. W. Kuchler U.S. potential natural vegetation types, Saranac Lake would have a dominant vegetation type of Northern Hardwoods/Spruce (108), with a dominant vegetation form of Northern Hardwoods (23). The plant hardiness zone is 4a, with an average annual extreme minimum air temperature of −27.3 °F (−32.9 °C). The spring bloom typically peaks on approximately May 11 and fall color usually peaks around October 1.

== See also ==
- Adirondack Canoe Classic
- Saranac Lake Free Library- Research Room
- Church Street Historic District (Saranac Lake, New York)
- William L. Coulter
- Cure Cottages of Saranac Lake
- William G. Distin
- Historic Saranac Lake
- North Country Community College
- Martha Reben
- Saranac Lake High School
- Leslie Hoffman
