= Hill Cottage (Saranac Lake, New York) =

Historic house in New York, United States

- U.S. National Register of Historic Places
- U.S. Historic district – Contributing property
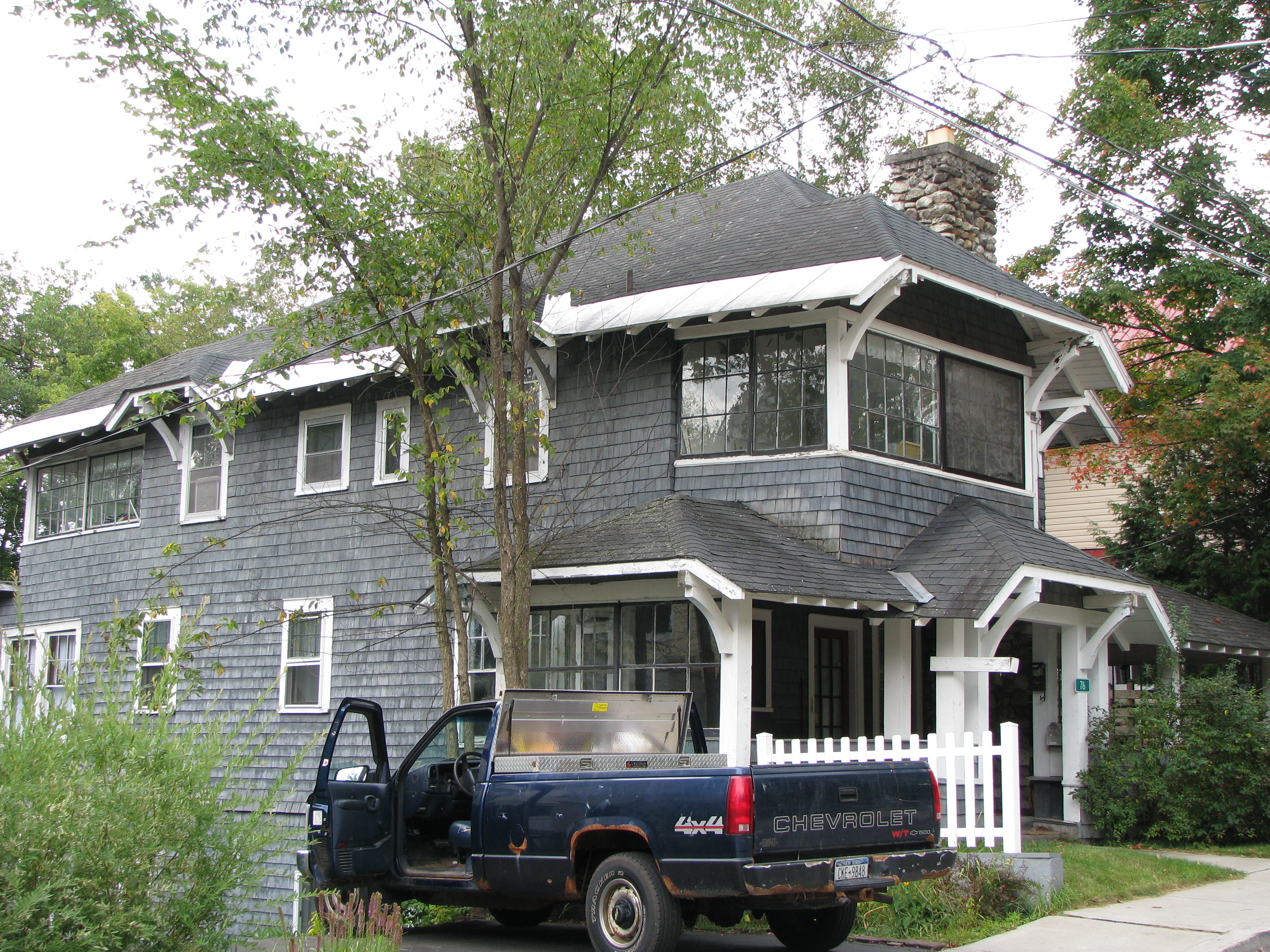
- Hill Cottage, September 2008

- Location within New York Location within the United States
- Location: 36 Franklin Ave., Harrietstown / Saranac Lake, New York
- Coordinates: 44°19′36″N 74°7′32″W
- Area: less than one acre
- Built: 1913
- MPS: Saranac Lake MPS
- NRHP reference No.: 92001475
- Added to NRHP: November 6, 1992

Hill Cottage is a historic cure cottage located at Saranac Lake, town of Harrietstown in Essex and Franklin County, New York. It was built about 1913 and is a two to four story, shingled frame house on a stone foundation, with a jerkinhead gable roof and built into the side of a hill. It features an open first floor porch and second story cure porch on the front facade, four stories of cure porches in the rear, and prominent roof overhangs. It is in the American Craftsman style and designed specifically for use as a private sanatorium.

It was listed on the National Register of Historic Places in 1992. It is located in the Helen Hill Historic District.
