= Kennedy Cottage (Saranac Lake, New York) =

Historic house in New York, United States

- U.S. National Register of Historic Places
- U.S. Historic district – Contributing property
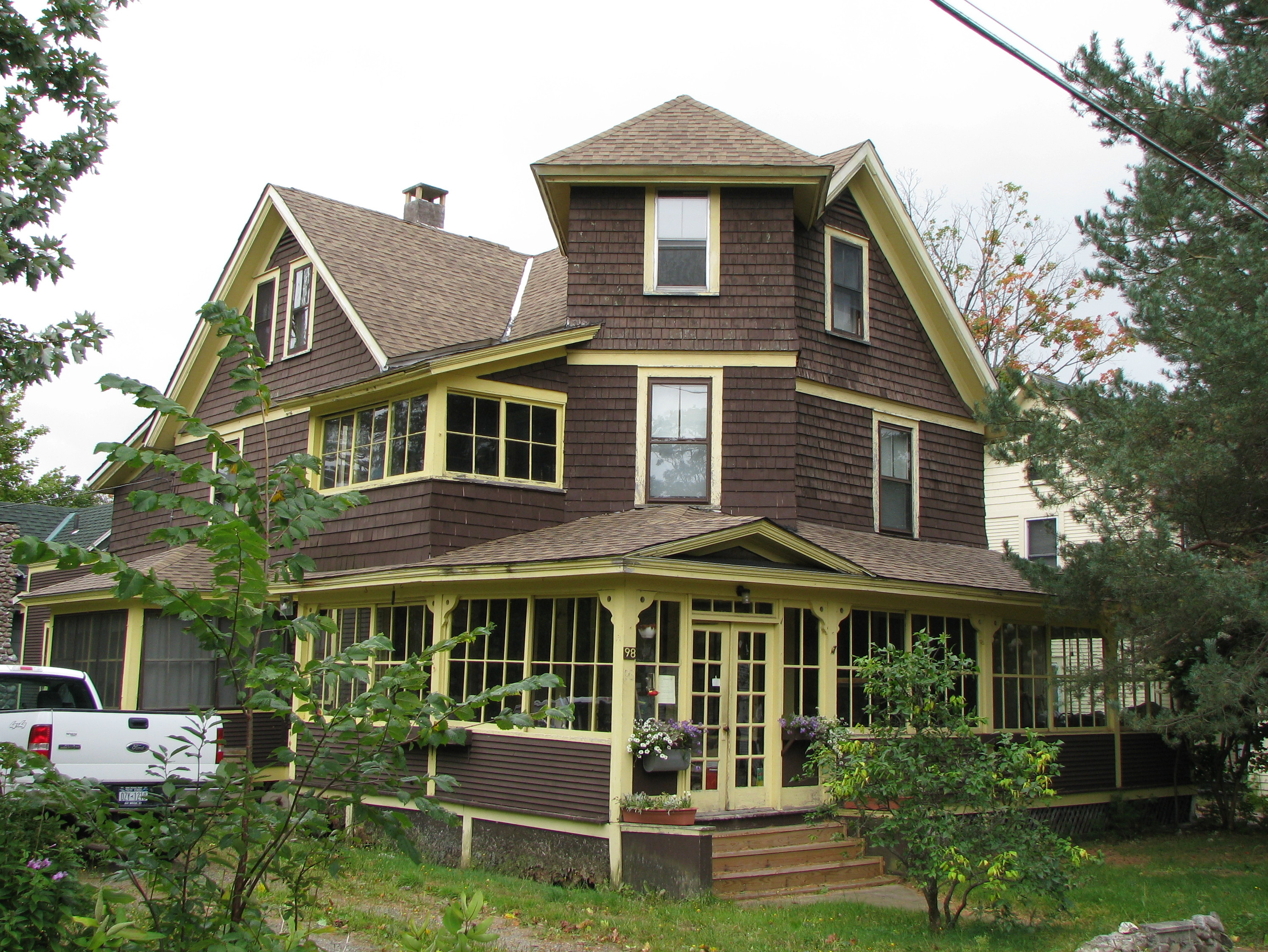
- Kennedy Cottage, September 2008

- Location within New York Location within the United States
- Location: 26 Shepard St., North Elba / Saranac Lake, New York
- Coordinates: 44°19′37″N 74°7′36″W
- Area: less than one acre
- Built: 1897
- Architectural style: Queen Anne
- MPS: Saranac Lake MPS
- NRHP reference No.: 92001437
- Added to NRHP: November 6, 1992

Kennedy Cottage is a historic cure cottage located at Saranac Lake, town of North Elba in Essex County, New York. It was built about 1897 and is a large, 2 1/2-story wood-frame rectangular structure in the Queen Anne style. It features a 3-story tower set at a 45-degree angle at the northwest corner of the house, glass-enclosed verandah, and three visible attached cure porches. It was operated as a private sanatorium and the National Vaudeville Artists Philanthropic Association sent patients here before the opening of Will Rogers Memorial Hospital in 1928.

It was listed on the National Register of Historic Places in 1992. It is located in the Helen Hill Historic District.
