= Coulter Cottage =

Historic house in New York, United States

- U.S. National Register of Historic Places
- U.S. Historic district – Contributing property
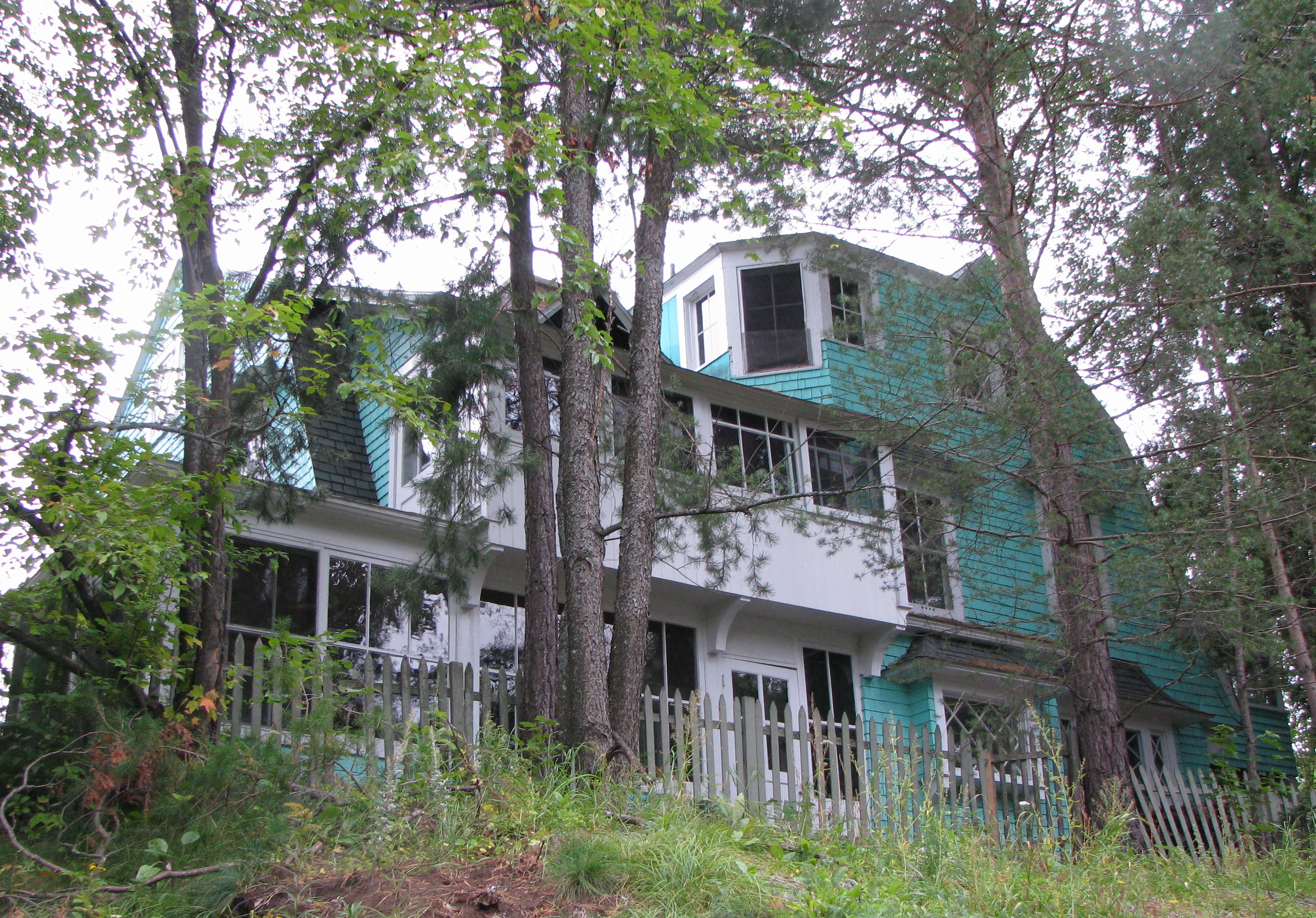
- Coulter Cottage, September 2008

- Location within New York Location within the United States
- Location: 34 Shepard Ave., North Elba / Saranac Lake, New York
- Coordinates: 44°19′32″N 74°7′35″W
- Area: less than one acre
- Built: 1897
- Architect: Coulter, William
- Architectural style: Shingle Style
- MPS: Saranac Lake MPS
- NRHP reference No.: 92001438
- Added to NRHP: November 6, 1992

Coulter Cottage is a historic cure cottage located at Saranac Lake, town of North Elba in Essex County, New York.

It was built between 1897 and 1899 and is a 2 1/2-story wood-frame structure on a stone foundation and topped by a gambrel roof in the Shingle Style. It features a sitting out porch and four upper story sleeping porches. The house was designed by noted Adirondack area architect William L. Coulter (1865–1907). It was listed on the National Register of Historic Places in 1992.

It is located in the Helen Hill Historic District.
