= Lent Cottage =

- U.S. National Register of Historic Places
- U.S. Historic district – Contributing property
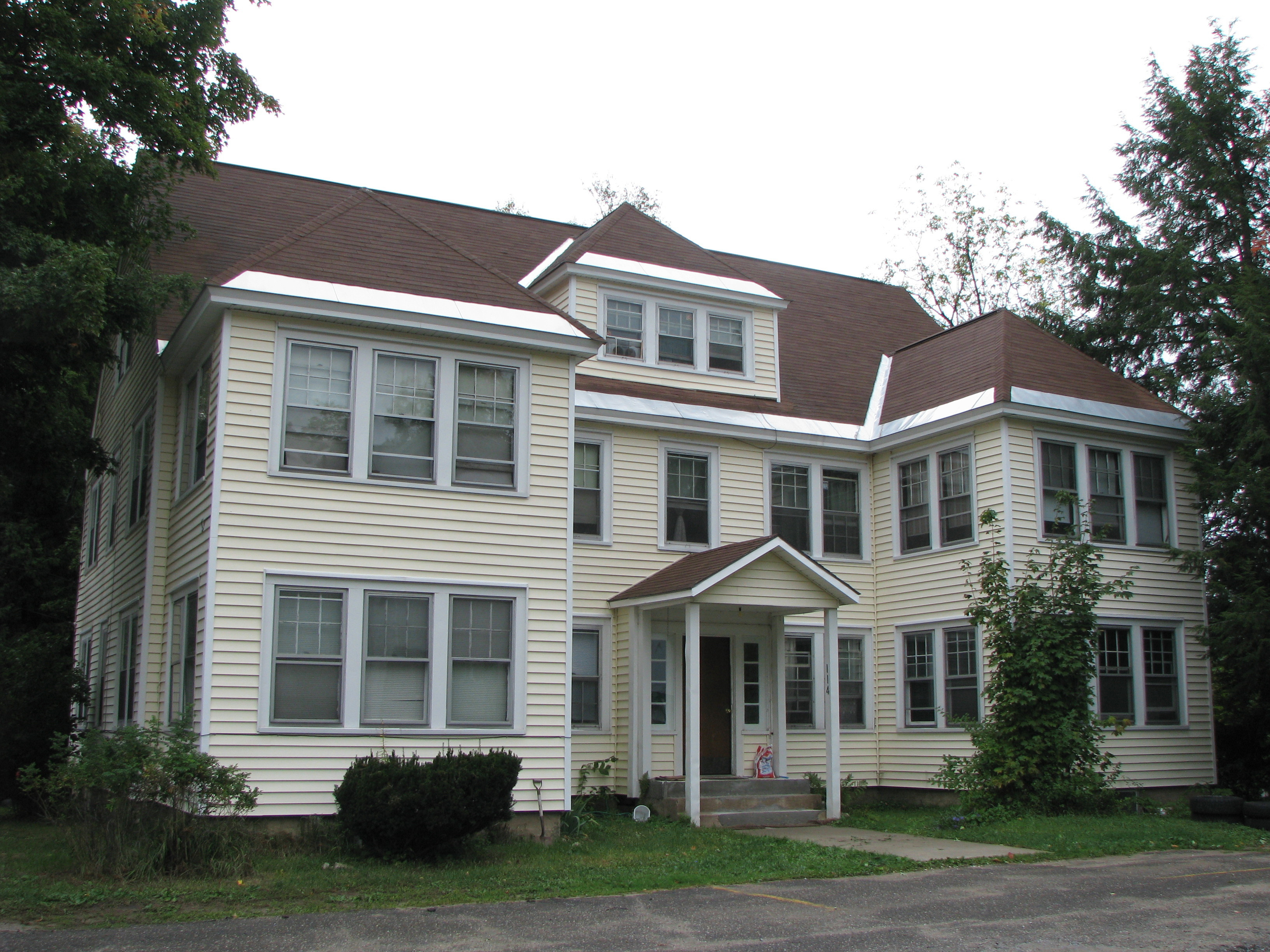
- Lent Cottage, September 2008

- Location within New York Location within the United States
- Location: 18 Franklin Ave., North Elba / Saranac Lake, New York
- Coordinates: 44°19′43″N 74°7′33″W
- Area: less than one acre
- Built: 1920
- Architect: Scopes & Feustmann; Ades, Simon
- Architectural style: Colonial Revival
- MPS: Saranac Lake MPS
- NRHP reference No.: 92001462
- Added to NRHP: November 6, 1992

Lent Cottage is a historic apartment house built as a cure cottage located at Saranac Lake, town of North Elba in Essex County, New York. It was built about 1920 and is a 2 1/2-story, wood frame, side-gabled structure with two hipped-roofed wings extending from the principal facade. It is in the Colonial Revival style. Each two bedroom apartment features a 9 feet by 13 feet cure porch and the property includes a flagstone patio. It was once operated as a tubercular sanatorium.

It was listed on the National Register of Historic Places in 1992. It is located in the Helen Hill Historic District.
