= Will Rogers Memorial Hospital =

- U.S. National Register of Historic Places
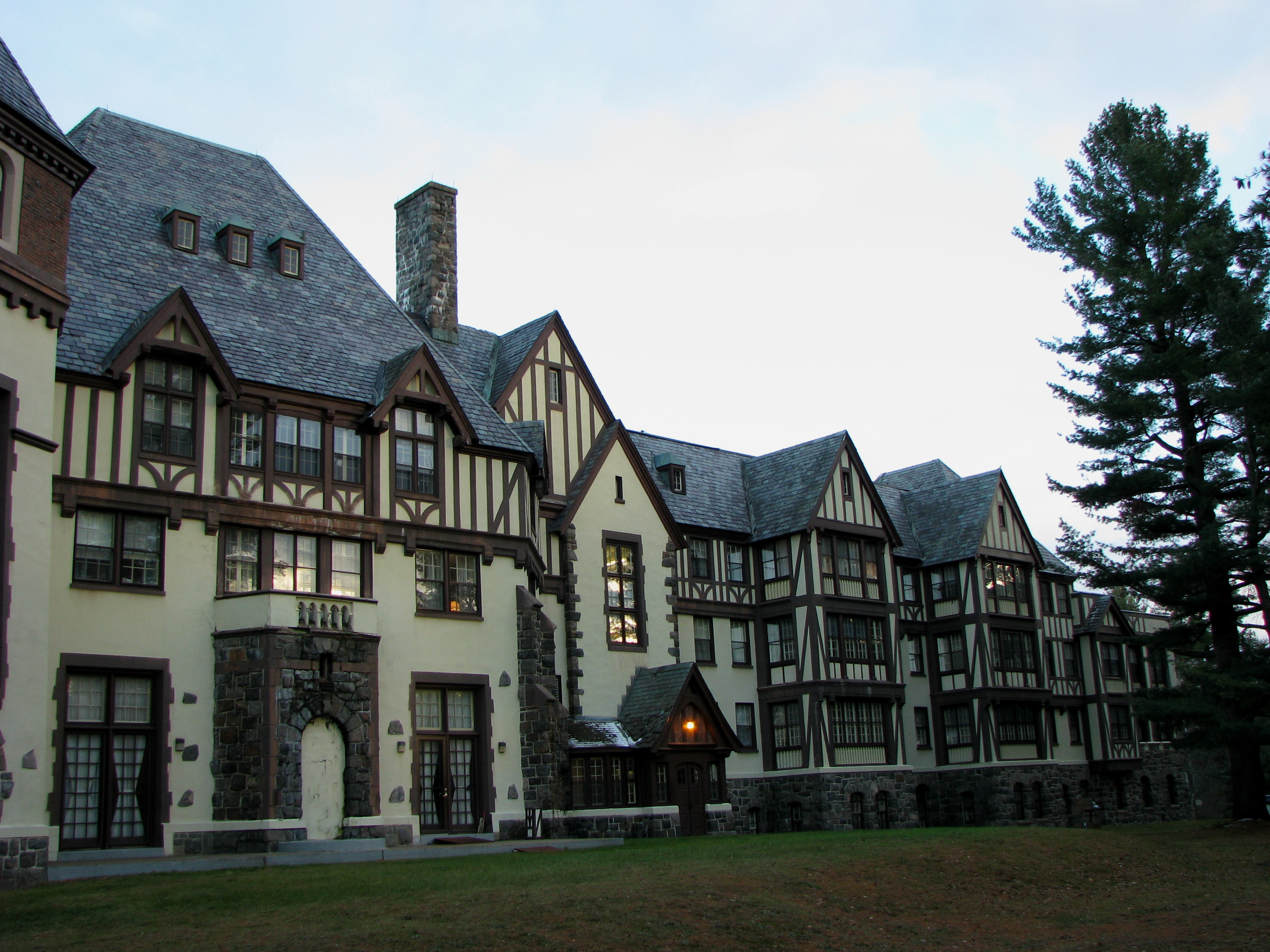
- Former Will Rogers Memorial Hospital, November 2008

- Location within New York Location within the United States
- Location: NY 86, Saranac Lake, New York
- Coordinates: 44°18′39″N 74°6′51″W
- Area: 5.8 acres (2.3 ha)
- Built: 1928
- Architect: Scopes, William E.
- Architectural style: Tudor Revival
- NRHP reference No.: 83001679
- Added to NRHP: September 8, 1983

Will Rogers Memorial Hospital is a historic tuberculosis sanatorium located at Saranac Lake in Essex County, New York. It was built in 1928 as the National Vaudeville lodge by the National Vaudeville Artists Association, who previously sent patients to the Kennedy Cottage. It is a three-story, T-shaped, steel frame and reinforced concrete structure above a raised basement. It is faced in stucco and decorative half-timber framing in the Tudor Revival style. It features asymmetrical massing, a three-story polygonal tower with a hexagonal roof, and three story pavilions with recessed sleeping porches. It was named in honor of entertainer Will Rogers (1879-1935) in 1936 and provided unconventional tubercular treatment to entertainment industry patients from 1936 to 1975. New York State demanded upgrades in the building, which would have cost over a million dollars. The Will Rogers Institute decided it was cheaper to buy a building downstate, out of the Adirondack Park, than to update the existing building. Over 100 jobs were lost because of New York State's demand.

It also was open as a night club but when casinos were voted down in New York, it was closed. Then it was open as an apartment house. It stood abandoned for years slowly deteriorating. It was briefly used as press headquarters for the 1980 Winter Olympics. Finally it was bought and after a huge renovation was done both to the outside and inside, it currently houses an independent living facility known as Saranac Village at Will Rogers.

It was listed on the National Register of Historic Places in 1983.
