= Marvin Cottage =

Historic house in New York, United States

- U.S. National Register of Historic Places
- U.S. Historic district – Contributing property
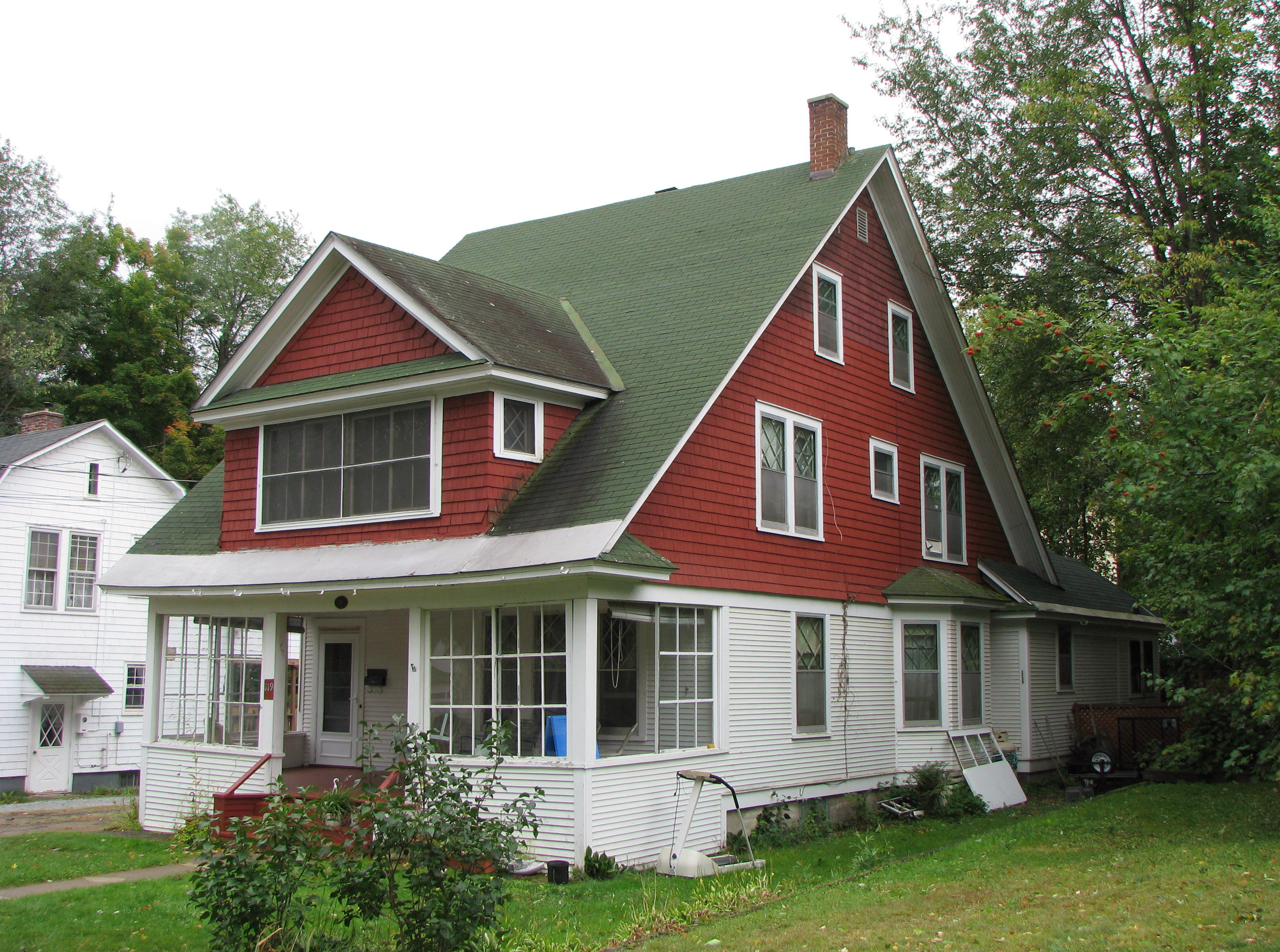
- Marvin Cottage, September 2008

- Location within New York Location within the United States
- Location: 15 Franklin St., North Elba / Saranac Lake, New York
- Coordinates: 44°19′43″N 74°7′36″W
- Area: less than one acre
- Built: 1900
- Architectural style: Bungalow/Craftsman
- MPS: Saranac Lake MPS
- NRHP reference No.: 92001461
- Added to NRHP: November 6, 1992

Marvin Cottage is a historic cure cottage located at Saranac Lake, town of North Elba in Essex County, New York. It was built about 1900 and is a two-story wood frame dwelling with a gable roof that extends from the front of the house to create a verandah. It features a large, gabled cure porch dormer and a second floor sleeping porch. It was operated as a private, non-nursing sanatorium.

It was listed on the National Register of Historic Places in 1992. It is located in the Helen Hill Historic District.
