= Leslie Hoffman =

American actress

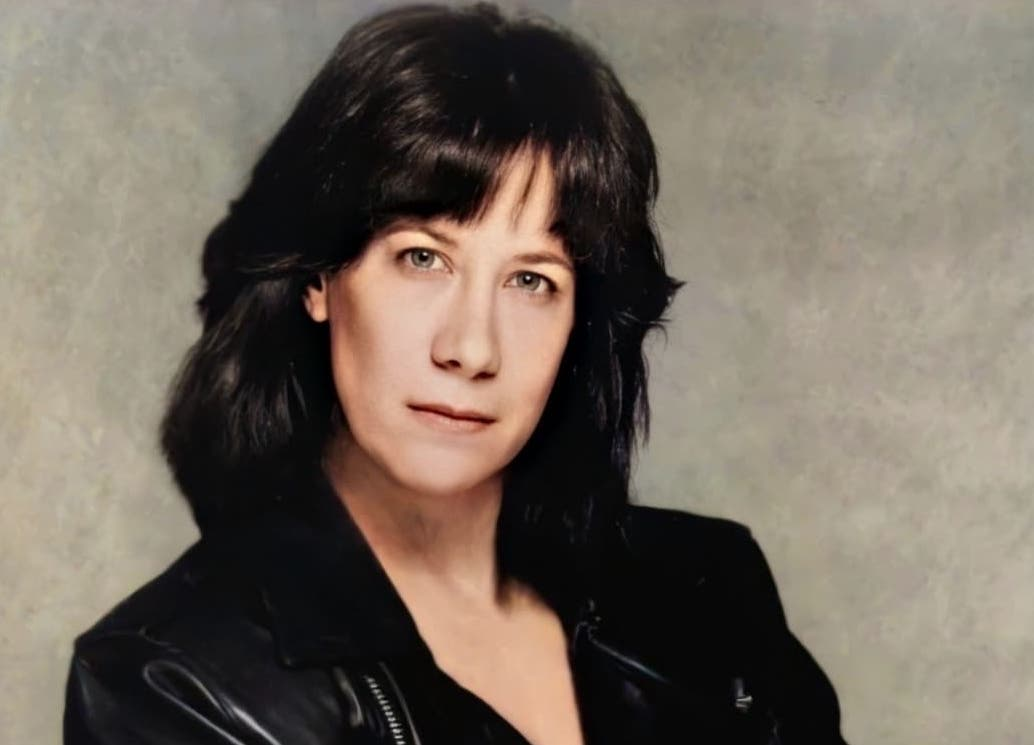
- Hoffman in 1980
- Born: Leslie Gail Hoffman
- Occupations: Stunt performer; stunt coordinator; actress
- Years active: 1976–2002

Leslie Gail Hoffman is an American former stunt performer, stunt coordinator, and actress.

== Career ==
Hoffman's early education and training included gymnastics, ballet camps, the American Academy of Dramatic Arts and Herbert Berkoff Studios in New York. She was inspired to pursue stunt acting on seeing a Universal Studios Tour stunt show. She traveled to California to study at stuntman Paul Stader's stunt gym.

She began stunt work in the 1970s with the film Two-Minute Warning (1976), and several television series, including Police Story and M*A*S*H. She performed a 78-foot high fall into water for The Love Boat, and did some work on Fantasy Island and Charlie's Angels. She was the double for the six-foot tall Lainie Kazan in a circular stair fall for Columbo. She also stunt doubled for Doris Roberts in the TV series Remington Steele. Film acting work included Avalanche (1978), Deadly Friend (1986), Trust Me (1989) and The Naked Gun (1988).

Hoffman played the Hall Guard in the original Nightmare on Elm Street (1984), and performed stunt work in I Wanna Hold Your Hand (1978), Motel Hell (1980), Resurrection (1980), Clue (1985), Alien Nation (1988), Mars (1997) and Mystery Men (1999). She served as stunt coordinator for, and acted in, the ABC After School Special Me and My Hormones (1996). She performed as the stunt-double for Laurie Metcalf in Scream 2 (1997).

== Union involvement ==
Hoffman was the first stuntwoman elected to the Screen Actors Guild Board of Directors, where she served from 1981 to 1984. As a director, she advocated for stuntwomen and stuntpersons of color, advocating for equal work and representation in the union. She served as the Co-Chair and the Chair on the National Stunt and Safety Committee. She was the Chair of the Stuntwomen Committee under the Stunt National Stunt and Safety Committee. Being interested in the safety of young Actors, she was the Co-Chair of the Young Performers Committee. The Screen Actors Guild, along with Barrie Howard the Chair of the Committee, sent them up to Sacramento told talk about the Twilight Zone accident.

She lost her bid for re-election in 1985.

Hoffman was also the first stuntperson elected to the AFTRA Los Angeles Local Board and the AFTRA National Board. With the help of Frank Maxwell, AFTRA President and Howard Caine, AFTRA Board Member, the category of Stunts was created.

From the 1990s onward, she worked as a stunt coordinator and rigger on several films, as well as continuing to double for several actresses in feature films and television. Her work includes stunt acting roles in multiple episodes of the Star Trek: Voyager and Star Trek: Deep Space Nine television series. Hoffman provided stunt coordination for student film productions for USC, Loyola Marymount University and UCLA.

Hoffman became disabled in 2002, ending her career as a stuntwoman and stunt coordinator. Now on Social Security Disability due to trauma to her body doing stunt work, Hoffman advocates for fair treatment for disabled stunt performers.

In 2021 Hoffman is running for the Los Angeles Local Board and also to be a Delegate at the SAG-AFTRA Convention.

== SAG Pension and Health lawsuit ==
Hoffman has been involved with a lawsuit against the Screen Actors Guild Pension and Health Plan for over 8 years. Her most recent victory came against the Plan, January 4, 2019, when the 9th District Court overturned a Lower Court ruling against her for the second time.

November 2019, two Lower Court Judges either ruled against her or did a summary judgement. Then two 9th District Court hearings have overturned the Lower Court decision, stating that the judge "erred". Now the third Lower Court judge appointed to the case has chastised the Screen Actors Guild Pension for all the violations they did, but unfortunately wants the Trustees to review the case.

On January 4, 2019 the 9th District Court of Southern California overturned Judge Manuel's summary judgement and sent it back down to the Lower Court. It was then ignored by Judge Real until Hoffman's Attorney sent a motion to Real. Real then decided that the case should go to arbitration. Real died before the Arbitration Judge could hear it and the arbitration date was removed from the schedule.

Judge Gary Klausner was then appointed to the case and the SAG Pension and Health Lawyers asked that the arbitration happen, which was approve. No settlement was reached so Judge Klausner had to make a decision on a case that had already been overturn twice by the 9th District Court. He ruled in favor of Hoffman by remanded it back to the SAG P&H Trustees for a decision.

January 15, 2020 Judge Klausner was replaced by Judge Cormac Carney (no explanation given). Judge Carney has issued a statement that the SAG P&H must pay Ms. Hoffman all back Pension Payments and future ones. Though this seems as a victory the SAG P&H could always appeal this.

March 19, 2021, for the third time the 9th District Court has overturned a Los Angeles Lower Court Judges ruling against Hoffman

Hoffman has won both her Pension Lawsuit by a Judge in 2019. In 2021, a settlement was reached out of court for her Health Plan. She is the only SAG-AFTRA Member that has sued the Producer-SAG Pension and Health Plans and won in both cases

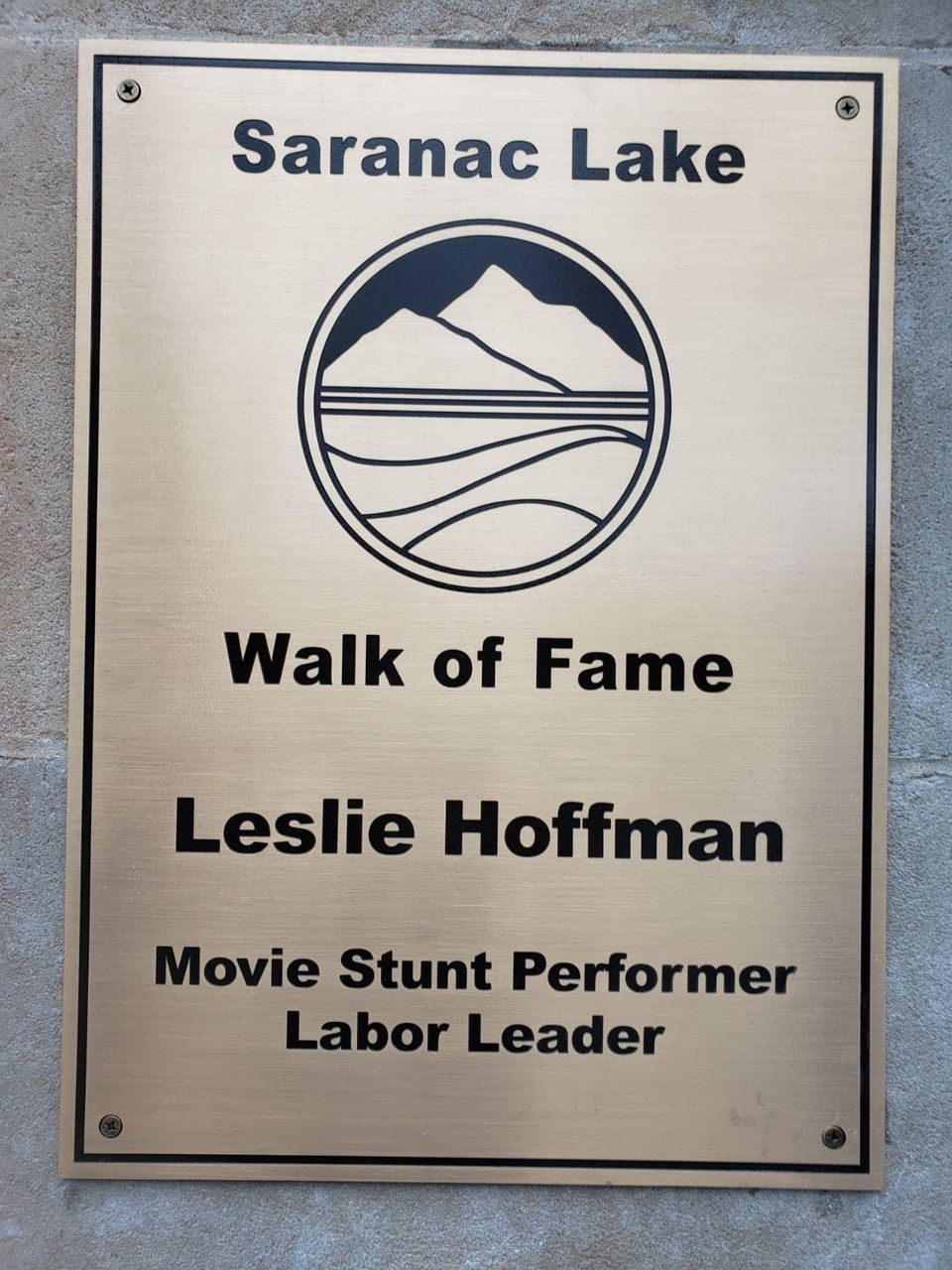

== Saranac Lake Walk Hall of Fame ==
On March 31, 2022, Hoffman''s Hometown honored her by including her in the Walk of Fame. The Plaque is displayed at Hotel Saranac 100 Main Street

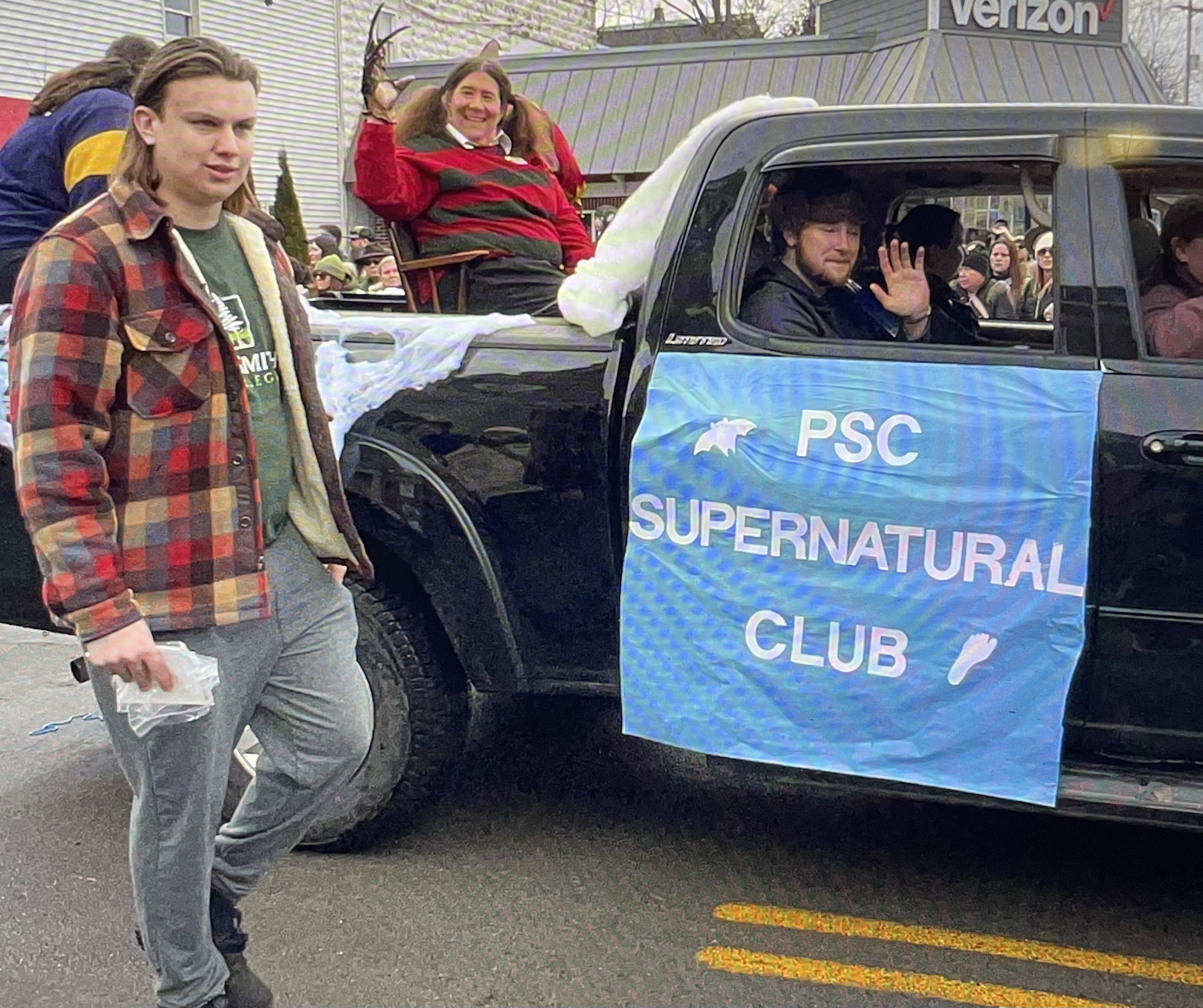
Leslie Hoffman as "Hall Guard"

== Saranac Lake Winter Carnival 2024 ==
The theme that year was "Creepy Carnival". Paul Smith College Students asked Hoffman to ride on their float as the Hall Guard from Nightmare on Elm Street.

== Guest at horror and sci-fi conventions ==
In 2024, Hoffman signed with James Davidson of Davidson & Co. Talent Agents Ltd. to be her Business Manager.
