= Bogie Cottage =

Historic house in New York, United States

- U.S. National Register of Historic Places
- U.S. Historic district – Contributing property
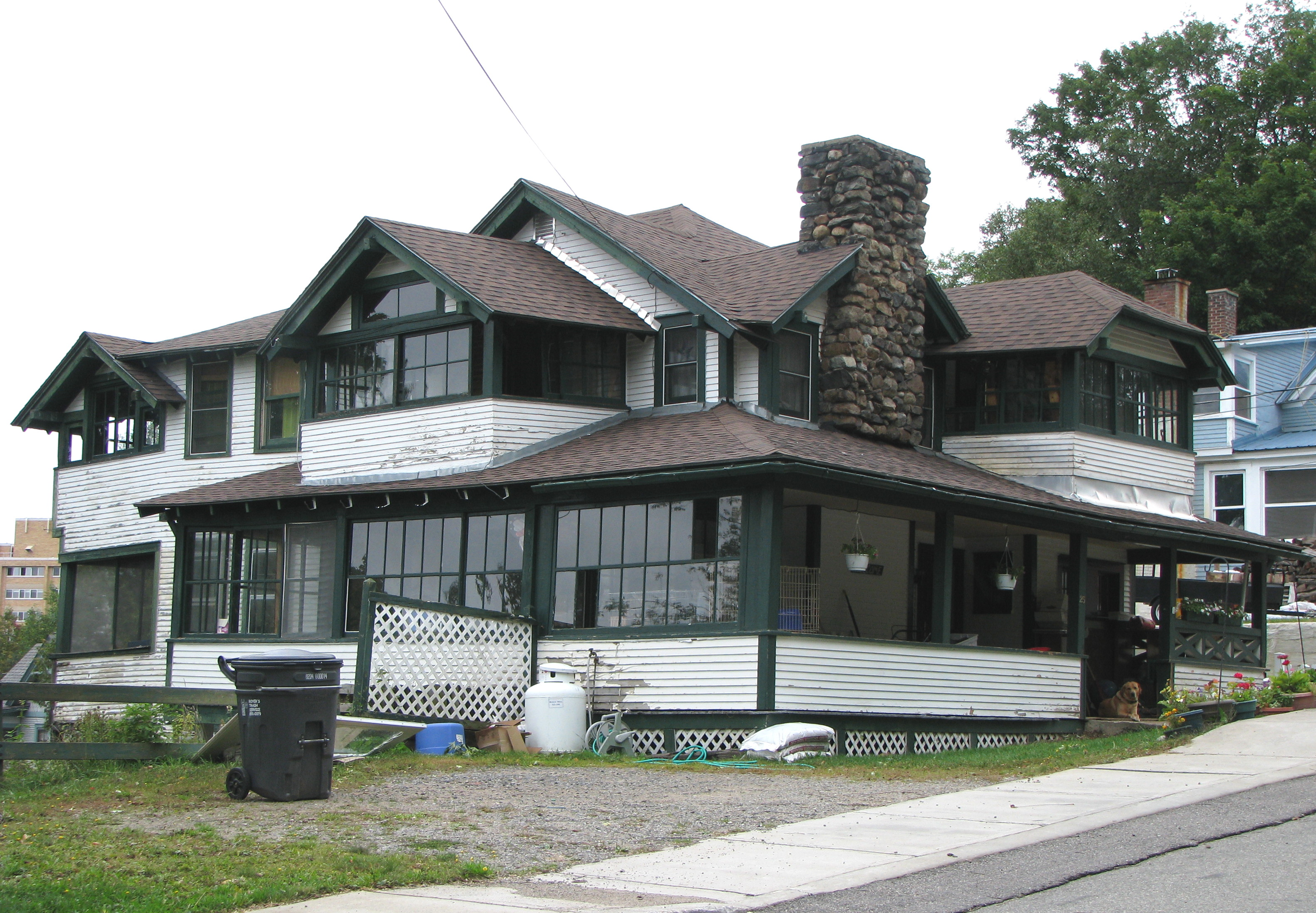
- Bogie Cottage, September 2008

- Location within New York Location within the United States
- Location: 59 Franklin St., North Elba / Saranac Lake, New York
- Coordinates: 44°19′30″N 74°7′33″W
- Area: less than one acre
- Built: 1908
- Architectural style: Late 19th And Early 20th Century American Movements, Arts and Crafts
- MPS: Saranac Lake MPS
- NRHP reference No.: 92001464
- Added to NRHP: November 6, 1992

Bogie Cottage is a historic cure cottage located at Saranac Lake, town of North Elba in Essex County, New York. It was built in 1908 and is a large, 2 1/2-story structure on a granite and fieldstone foundation in the American Craftsman style. It features a hipped roof, shed dormers, two cobblestone chimneys, and a verandah in addition to two levels of cure porches. The house was a registered sanatorium and operated as a boarding cottage at one time.

It was listed on the National Register of Historic Places in 1992.
