= Delavan Terrace Historic District =

Historic district in New York, United States

- U.S. National Register of Historic Places
- U.S. Historic district
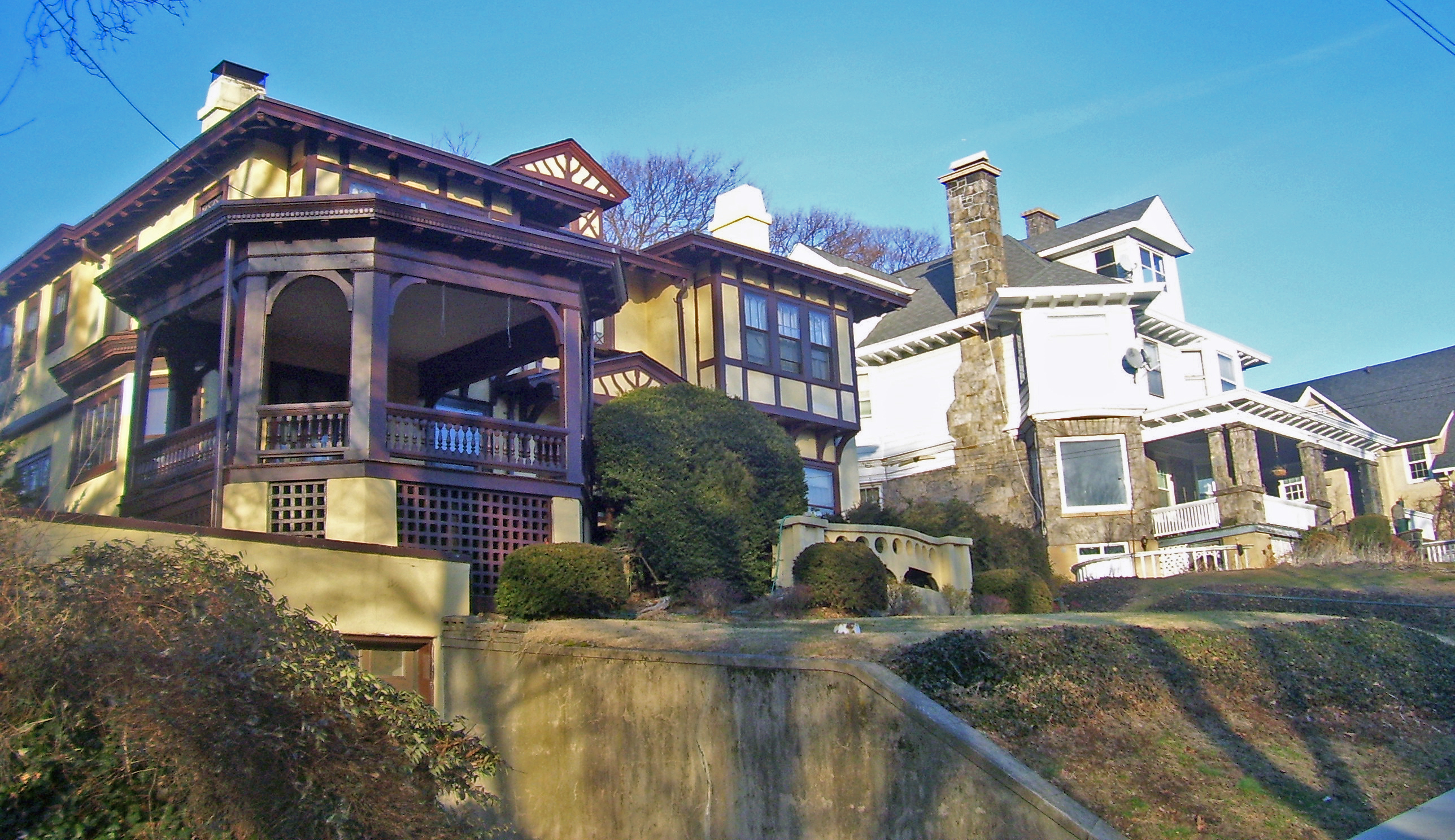
- Charles E. Otis and Griffith John houses, south elevation, 2009

- Location within New York Location within the United States
- Interactive map showing the location of Delavan Terrace Historic District
- Location: Yonkers, New York
- Coordinates: 40°56′42″N 73°53′29″W
- Area: 4.2 acres (1.7 ha)
- Built: 1854–1926
- Architect: Multiple
- Architectural style: Late 19th- and 20th-century Revivals, Late Victorian
- NRHP reference No.: 83001827
- Added to NRHP: September 15, 1983 (42 years ago)

The Delavan Terrace Historic District is located along the street of that name in Northwest Yonkers, New York, United States. It consists of 10 buildings (12 when originally designated), all houses. In 1983 it was recognized as a historic district and listed on the National Register of Historic Places.

The houses were home to a number of prominent industrialists in Yonkers at the time, since they enjoyed an excellent view over the Hudson River. They are built in Late Victorian and other turn of the 20th century revival architectural styles. One has one of the few remaining Eastlake interiors in the city. The earliest house in the district, the Smith-Collins House, dated to 1854 with an 1875 renovation, has since been demolished, spurring historic preservation efforts throughout Yonkers. Most of the district was built after 1900.

Originally it was home to affluent residents, such as local business executives at the Otis Elevator Company and the Alexander Smith Carpet Mills. Actress Billie Burke, an early silent film star who later played Glinda the Good Witch in The Wizard of Oz, lived on Delavan Terrace in the 1920s after her marriage to Florenz Ziegfeld, when she was concentrating on her stage career on Broadway. The district has become more middle-class over time as Yonkers has grown and suburbanized around it. All the remaining houses are privately owned. Many remain intact.

== Geography ==
The district is essentially rectangular in shape, covering both sides of Delavan Terrace and the lots at the corners on Palisade and Park Avenues. An extension at the southwest includes the now-vacant lot where the Smith–Collins House stood on the west side of Palisade. The total area is 4.2 acres (1.7 ha). Topographically, the street is on the south end of a ridge between the Hudson River a half-mile (1 km) to the west and one of its tributaries, the Saw Mill River, the same distance to the east. The terrain thus drops sharply to the south and west, and the east end of Delavan is 50 feet (15 m) higher than the west.

On the east and south are large modern apartment complexes. To the southwest is a sharp drop down into a parking lot for a Ukrainian American cultural center. Northwest of the district is another apartment complex. On the northeast and east are other houses, generally more modern than those in the district. The neighborhood in general is residential, with downtown Yonkers a mile (1.6 km) to the south-southwest.

== Buildings ==
All ten buildings in the district are houses. There are no non-contributing properties.

- 147 Park Avenue. The only property in the district not known by the name of an owner, this five-bay, two-and-a-half-story Mission Revival stucco-faced house dates to 1908. Its entrance porch has a hipped roof supported by stucco piers; the main entrance has a denticulated paneled surround with one-over-one double-hung sash window sidelights. Most of the sash windows elsewhere on the house are set in molded architraves. At the northeast corner is a six-sided pavilion. The main house's hipped pantile roof is pierced by dormer windows with six-over-six three-part windows. A hipped-roof, below-grade garage is on the east.
- Reuben Borland House, 10 Delavan Terrace. This is a timber frame two-bay, two-and-a-half-story house faced in stone at ground level and shingles on the upper stories topped by a cross-gabled gambrel roof. Built in 1904, it is a late application of the Queen Anne style. Its distinctive features include a recessed porch around the entrance and its architrave flanked by Ionic pilasters, as well as a variety of fenestration typical of the style, including bay windows, oriel windows and oval windows. Upstairs is a recessed attic porch with curved shingled cheek walls and semi-elliptical balcony supported by brackets. The roofline has flaring eaves and denticulated raking boards. Dormers have been added and a side balcony removed. The garage has a hipped roof and half-timbering.
- Alexander Denniston House, 6 Delavan Terrace. This three-bay, two-and-a-half-story cross-gabled Tudor Revival house dates to 1911. It, too, has a recessed pent-roofed entrance porch with four-pointed arch on the architrave, flanked by sidelights. Above it is a projecting gabled pavilion supported by consoles with pendants and diamond-paned casement windows. Elsewhere on the facades are bay windows and half-timbering in the gable ends, per the style. The side porch is supported by Tuscan columns; the rear porch has an open deck.
- A. Doty House, 4 Delavan Terrace. Built in 1926, this is the newest house in the district. It is a two-and-a-half-story, five-bay brick neo-Colonial building topped by a slate-shingled hipped roof with a balustrade at its apex. At the center of the ground floor on the north is a fluted, paneled main entrance surround with sidelights and an elliptical fanlight. The two six-over-six sash windows on either side have paneled lintels. At the roofline is a denticualted cornice. Segmental-arched dormers and end chimneys pierce the roof. On the east side a three-bay breezeway leads to the garage.
- William Howard House, 9 Delavan Terrace. Another two-and-a-half-story cross-gambreled frame Queen Anne, this was built in 1904. It features a front porch with wrought iron work and Ionic columns running the full three bays, topped by an open deck. Ionic pilasters also frame the double doors at the main entrance. Dormers pierce the roof; the original shingle siding has been covered over by vinyl.
- Griffith John House, 23 Delavan Terrace. This two-and-a-half-story, three-bay 1906 Queen Anne combines stone facing on the ground level with vinyl upstairs. The continuous porch has a bracketed cornice and is upheld by stone piers. A bay window projects at the southwest corner. The hipped roof is pierced by large projecting gabled dormers and a stone chimney.
- E.D. Knap House, 14 Delavan Terrace. This 1907 house is the only one in the district in the Western Stick style, demonstrating its evolution into the Bungalow style. Its shingled two and a half stories are four bays wide, with that facade looking east. It has a glazed entrance porch, oriel window on carved brackets, mix of casement and sash windows and a recessed first-story porch supported by wooden piers. The hipped roof has hipped dormers and exposed rafters at the roofline.
- Law–Baldwin House, 354 Palisade Avenue. With a construction date of 1886, this three-bay, three-and-a-half-story Shingle-style house is now the oldest property in the district. A one-story south wing was added in 1894. It features a continuous balustraded porch with Ionic columns and an open deck on top. In the gable ends of its intersecting gambrel roofs is a recessed window with curving cheeks. The roofline features denticulated raking boards.
- Littel House, 149 Park Avenue. This is a Tudor Revival–style house that has the stucco facing but not the half-timbering, built in 1915. Five bays in width and two and a half stories tall, its cross-gabled roof is complemented by a pent roof on the first-story entrance porch, supported by Tuscan columns with intervening trellis work. Wood string courses set off the stories. Oriels with diamond-paned casement windows are complemented by sash in various sizes on the main facades.
- Charles E. Otis House, 5 Delavan Terrace. This two-and-a-half-story, three-bay Tudor Revival house was built in 1904. It features a recessed four-centered pointed-arch balustraded entrance porch. Applied pilasters and sidelights frame the main entrance, and a projecting gabled entrance pavilion with half-timbering and wooden consoles. On the stucco and half-timbered facade themselves are a mixture of sash windows, diamond-paned casement and bracketed oriel windows. The hipped roof has a centrally placed gabled dormer; the garage is below grade.

=== Smith–Collins House ===
The Smith–Collins House was located at 323 Palisade Avenue. Built in 1854, it was the oldest building in the district at the time it was listed. It was a two-and-a-half-story High Victorian Gothic house with many bays, sided at first in clapboard and later stucco.

The Smith–Collins House, seen from the south in an aerial view shortly before demolition

Its most-striking feature was a three-story crenelated entrance tower on the northeast corner with a round-arched entrance and windows. It was complemented by bay windows elsewhere on the facade; the sash windows had wooden architraves and shutters. On the rear was a two-story glazed veranda with four center-arched windows and a balustraded terrace. The many gables on the roof were themselves pierced by gabled dormers with vergeboards.

In the rear was a carriage house, the only one in the district. It had its original clapboard siding and a hipped roof with a cupola. The main house's interior had Eastlake-style wooden paneling, molding and mantels. It was one of the few intact examples of that kind of interior in the city.

In 1875, it was renovated substantially. The clapboard was refaced with stucco. The porte-cochère, tower belvedere, gable trim and most of the front porch were removed. In 2007, it and the carriage house were demolished. Only the front wall and gate remain.

== History ==
Due to being part of large landholdings, Delavan Terrace, and the land that eventually became it, was developed later than some other comparable areas of the city. When it was, however, that development occurred in bursts which caught it up with them.

=== 1693–1853: Pastureland ===
The future Delavan Terrace was part of the original land grant to Frederick Philipse from the British crown during the colonial era. It was used as pasture, and remained so even after the Philipse family's lands were confiscated for their Loyalist stance during the American Revolution. Lemuel Wells, who eventually obtained that parcel as part of his 320-acre (130 ha) estate, was averse to selling or subdividing any of his real property, so it remained undeveloped when he died in 1842.

His heirs had less compunction about doing so, and by 1843 it had been sold and partitioned. Streets were soon surveyed and laid out, with houses coming not long afterwards. This process accelerated in 1849, when the Hudson River Railroad was built, spurring the industrialization of Yonkers.

=== 1853–1903: The first two houses ===
The first house in the future district was built during this period, although not by either of its later eponyms. In 1854, I.F. Wheeler built the house on the west side of Palisade Avenue, overlooking the river. It is likely that he was inspired by the work of Andrew Jackson Downing, an architect based upriver in Newburgh who had, until his death two years earlier, advocated for houses more harmonious with their natural surroundings than those built in the classically-inspired Federal or Greek Revival modes, the architectural styles that had up to then been prevalent in 19th-century America. Two designs in The Architecture of Country Houses, Downing's 1850 pattern book, strongly suggest the house Wheeler built.

In 1873, after the population of Yonkers had more than quadrupled, Wheeler's land and house were sold and became part of the estate of Alexander Smith, founder of the carpet mills that bear his name, also today listed on the Register. Property tax records show that the assessed valuation of Smith's new purchase almost tripled, suggesting either that a new structure was built there or, as seems more likely, the existing house was substantially renovated. The effect was to transform it from the Italianate style promoted by Downing into the High Victorian Gothic then becoming popular. In this it shares many similarities with Glenview, financier John Bond Trevor's home on the banks of the river, now part of the Hudson River Museum. Both homes have their main entrances located in towers with belvederes, similar consoles, balustraded porches and Eastlake interiors.

It is believed today that the house was, at that time, the residence of Alexander Smith's oldest son, Warren Baldwin Smith. He lived there until succeeding his father after his death in 1878 and moved to Hillbright, the estate's main house. That year, the house was sold to Charles Collins, a merchant from Hartford who had retired to Yonkers. These two owners lent it their names.

The Smith–Collins House was joined in 1886 by a house just up Palisade and across the street built by Walter W. Law, an executive at another Yonkers carpet company. Its use of the then-popular Shingle Style, exemplified by not only that face on its exterior but its overhanging roof and generally large form, made it markedly different from its neighbor. Law lived there only for three years, after which he took a job at a competing carpet company and moved to New York. He is known for later having developed the village of Briarcliff Manor.

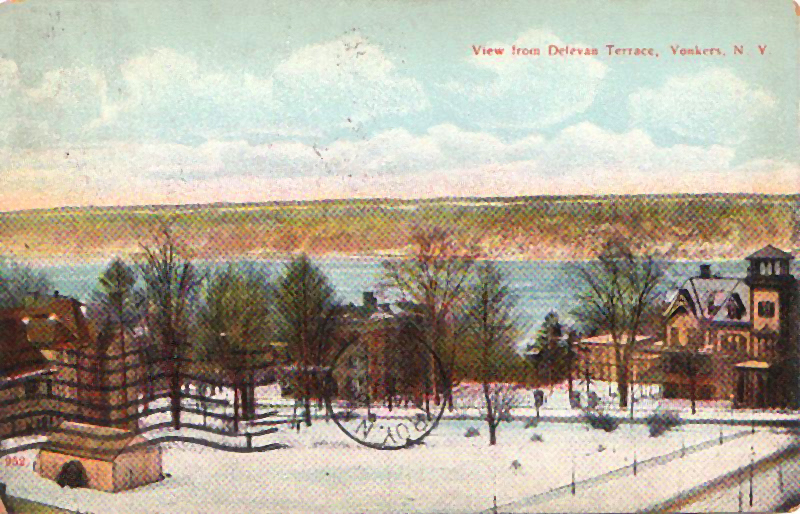
Postcard showing view from Delavan Terrace in years just after it was opened. Smith–Collins House at right.

In 1894 the house was purchased by the Bradley–Currier Co. and enlarged. The following year it was in turn sold to William Delavan Baldwin, an executive with the Otis Elevator Company, another one of Yonkers' industrial concerns. At that time all of the land in the current district was part of his estate, known as Hillcrest. Baldwin became president of Otis in 1900, and then subdivided the property four years later, opening Delavan Terrace.

=== 1904–1926: Suburbanization ===
By the end of the new century's first decade, most of the new street had been developed. Like their predecessors, the houses reflected the latest architectural trends, largely built in the Tudor Revival or Queen Anne styles. With the exception of the house at 5 Delavan, built by Charles Otis, grandson of company founder Elisha Otis, they embraced the latter's asymmetrical massing. But their ornamentation was more restrained than the early Queen Annes of the 1880s, reflecting the new century's slow embrace of minimalism and functionalism. The house at 10 Delavan, built by Reuben Borland, who had worked his way to the presidency of the Smith Mills from his start as a bobbin boy, is an excellent example of a typical middle-class home from this period.

In 1910, the Smith-Collins House, which had been owned by Collins' son, changed hands again. Isidore Beaudrias, a prominent local lawyer, bought it and renovated it, giving it the appearance it would have for the remainder of its days. He refaced it in stucco and removed much of its porches and decorative trim. These changes brought it into line with the same trends in architecture that were evident in the newer houses. Its basic form, however, remained unchanged from its original construction.

Two more of those early houses introduced new styles associated with the West Coast into the district. The Knap House used the Western Stick Style, developed in response to California's sunny climate and rarely used in Yonkers. Similarly, 147 Park Avenue used the Mission Revival style, also known at the time for its popularity in California. The next house to be built in the district, the Littel House of 1915 at 149 Park Avenue, marked a return to its architectural roots in its spare application of the Tudor Revival style, keeping its forms and massing but dropping the half-timber from its stucco exterior.

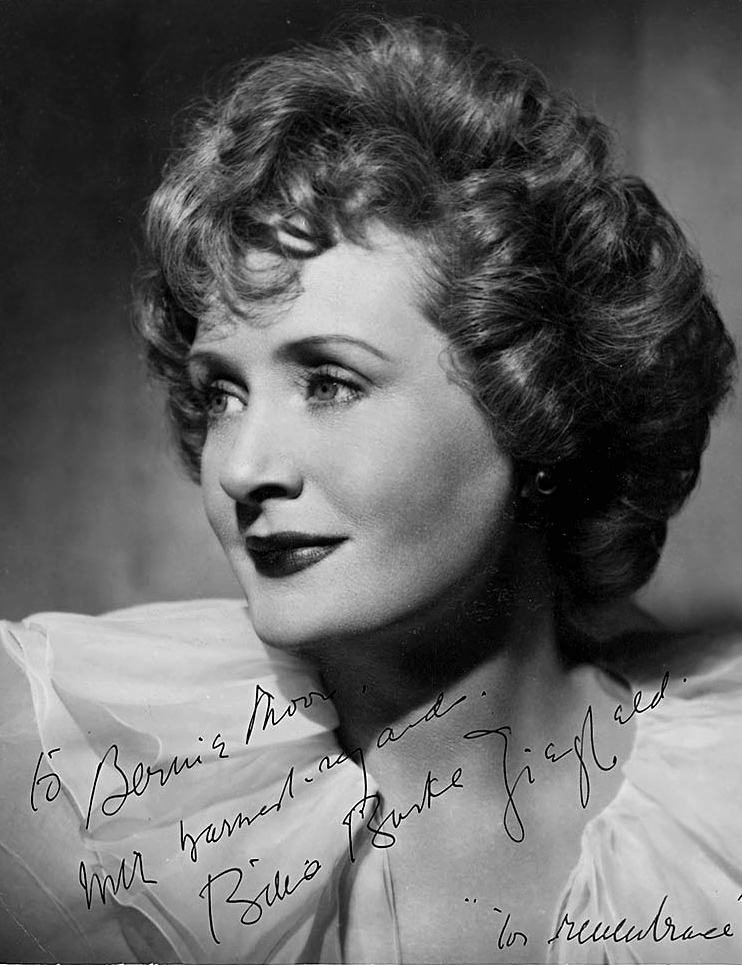
Bille Burke around the time she lived on Delavan Terrace

In the years after World War I, due to the growth in automobile ownership, suburban neighborhoods like Delavan Terrace multiplied. One famous resident for the time, actress Billie Burke, best known to modern audiences for her later role as Glinda the Good Witch in The Wizard of Oz, found the lifestyle offered by Delavan Terrace to her liking. She had originally made her name as a silent-film star, but after marrying producer Florenz Ziegfeld, chose to concentrate on stage work and settled in the Borland House, continuing a lifelong pattern of living at some remove from the places she worked, in this case the theaters of Broadway in Manhattan.

She reportedly liked the neighborhood, and the Borland House in particular, because it reminded her of the cottage in the London neighborhood of St John's Wood where she had lived while growing up. "She seems ... to have warmed to its very ordinariness," observed one biographer. A reporter who visited the house to interview her described it as "a homey one and a half story red granite and wood structure built upon a still green terrace ... About it hangs an air of quaintness and quiet." She preferred simple interior decoration, eschewing pictures of herself in favor of modest furniture, paintings and Native American handicraft.

The district's last house was built in 1926. Like its predecessors, the A. Doty House at 4 Delavan Terrace used a contemporary style, in its case the neo-Georgian mode, a substyle of the Colonial Revival style that evolved from the Queen Anne Style at the end of the 19th century and has remained popular in the U.S. ever since. The Doty House's signature features of that style are its symmetrical facade, Adamesque interior detailing, and balustraded deck atop its hipped roof. Like the other revival-styled houses on the street, it testifies to its owners' quest for stability and legitimacy regardless of the geographical or historical appropriateness of the style.

=== 1927–present: Preservation issues ===
Delavan Terrace spent the rest of the 20th century as just another Yonkers residential street. Owners came and went but kept the houses largely as they had found them. Vinyl siding was installed on two, but it was not a significant enough change to prevent the district's listing on the Register in 1983.

That changed slightly with the 21st century. In 2007 the city allowed the owner of the Smith–Collins House to demolish it. Former City Council President Chuck Lesnick, who had been trying to prevent the demolition, was moved to offer legislation that would make any demolition of a building over 75 years old subject to the city's landmark review process.

== See also ==
- National Register of Historic Places listings in Yonkers, New York
