= Thomas Ricks =

Thomas Ricks may refer to:

- Thomas E. Ricks (Mormon pioneer) (1828–1901), founder of Rexburg, Idaho
- Thomas E. Ricks (journalist) (born 1955), American journalist on defense topics

== See also ==
- Thomas F. Ricks House, National Register of Historic Places building in Eureka, California
