= William S. Clark House =

Historic house in California, United States

- U.S. National Register of Historic Places
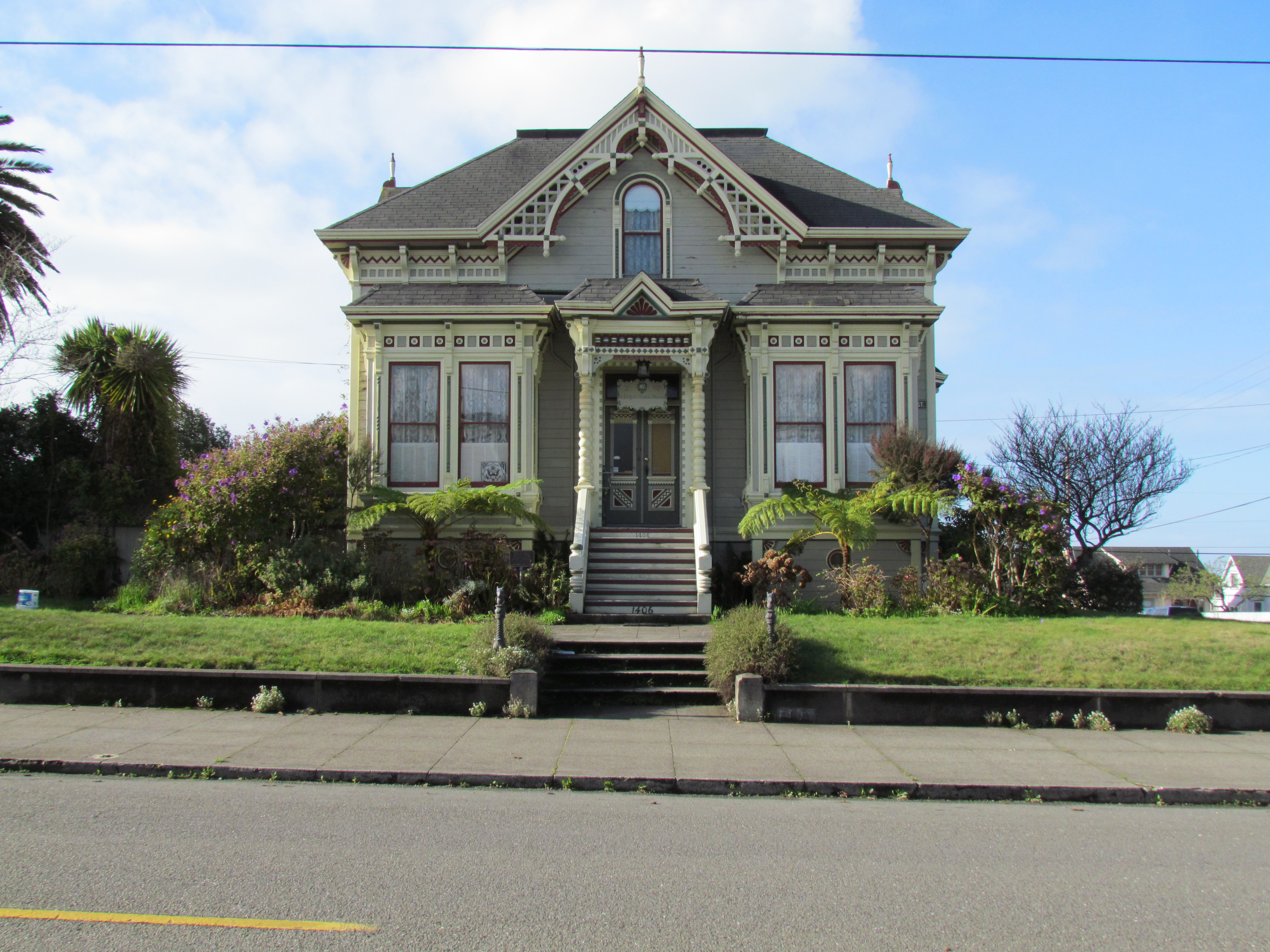

- Location within California Location within the United States
- Location: 1406 C St., Eureka, California
- Coordinates: 40°47′39″N 124°10′3″W
- Built: 1888
- Built by: Butterfield, Fred B.
- Architectural style: Stick-Eastlake-Queen Anne Victorian architecture
- NRHP reference No.: 87002394
- Added to NRHP: January 14, 1988

The William S. Clark House, in Eureka, Humboldt County, northern California was built in 1888 by master carpenter Fred B. Butterfield. Its design includes elements of both Eastlake and Queen Anne Styles of Victorian architecture.

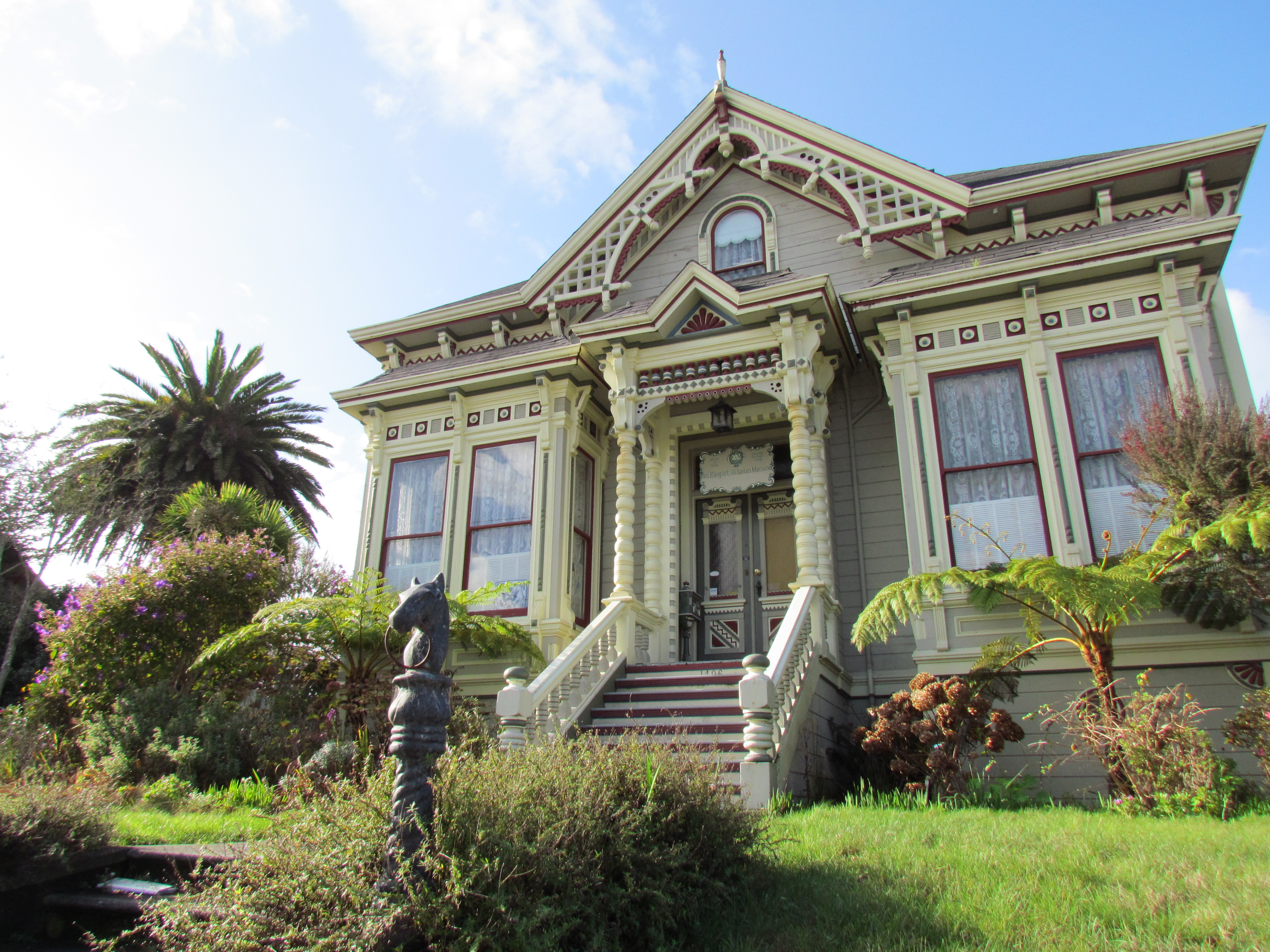

It was built for William S. Clark, a businessman, real estated developer, and mayor of Eureka.

It was listed on the National Register of Historic Places in 1988.

The builder, Fred Butterfield, co-built (along with Walter Butterfield) the NRHP-listed Thomas F. Ricks House at 730 H St. in Eureka.

== See also ==
- National Register of Historic Places listings in Humboldt County, California
