= Glenview Mansion =

Historic house in New York, United States

- John Bond Trevor House
- U.S. National Register of Historic Places
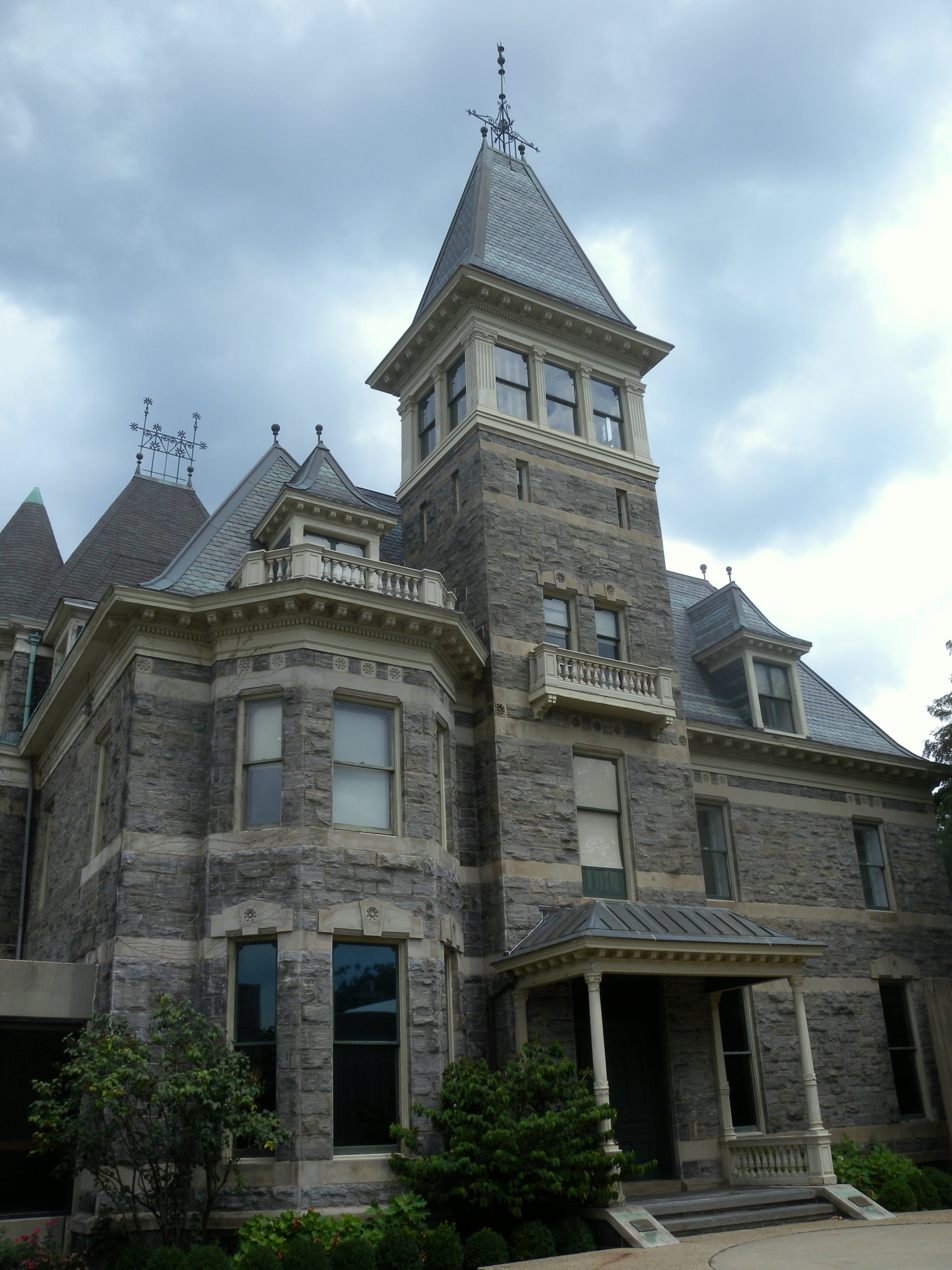
- East (front) elevation, 2010

- Location within New York Location within the United States
- Interactive map showing the location of Glenview Mansion
- Location: 511 Warburton Avenue; Yonkers, New York
- Coordinates: 40°57′16″N 73°53′46″W
- Area: 23 acres (9.3 ha)
- Built: 1876-1877
- Architect: Charles W. Clinton
- Architectural style: Late Victorian, Eclectic
- NRHP reference No.: 72000921
- Added to NRHP: June 19, 1972

Glenview Mansion, listed on the National Register of Historic Places as the John Bond Trevor House, is located on Warburton Avenue in Yonkers, New York, United States. It is a stone house erected during the 1870s in an eclectic Late Victorian architectural style from a design by Charles W. Clinton. It was listed on the Register in 1972.

It is one of the few remaining buildings in Yonkers made of locally quarried greystone. Inside there is fine Eastlake cabinetry by the prominent Philadelphia cabinetmaker Daniel Pabst and other decorations and finishes; it is considered one of the finest interiors in that style in an American building open to the public.

Financier John Bond Trevor built the house as a small country estate that was nevertheless close enough to New York City to allow him to commute to his job in the city by rail. At the time he and his family moved in, it was surrounded by similar houses. By the time Trevor's second wife died in the early 1920s, Glenview had become the center of a suburban neighborhood. The design of the house and the way the Trevors lived there epitomizes the transition between country living and the modern suburb.

In 1924, after the Trevor family had moved out, the house became home to the Hudson River Museum for the next 45 years. The museum has since expanded, but the house remains part of the complex. Its rooms have been refurbished in the style of the period, and are open to visitors. Renovations in the early 21st century have better integrated the house with the rest of the museum.

== Building ==
The house itself is a 2½-story building, four bays on the south and east elevation, five on the west and three on the north. Its load-bearing walls are built of locally quarried greystone, laid in rough-hewn blocks, with Ohio sandstone ornamentation. Four projections supplement its rectangular form, the most prominent being an 84-foot (26 m) rectangular tower with a belvedere on the south (front) facade topped by a steep pyramidal roof. It is echoed by a smaller conical-roofed tower on the west face. There is a small front porch on the south and a rear stoop. Bay windows are on the south and west.

Atop is a hipped roof surfaced in composition shingles. At various locations it is pierced by ten dormer windows, some of them nested within gables. Several small brick chimneys, no longer functional, pierce the flat top of the roof near the northwest corner.

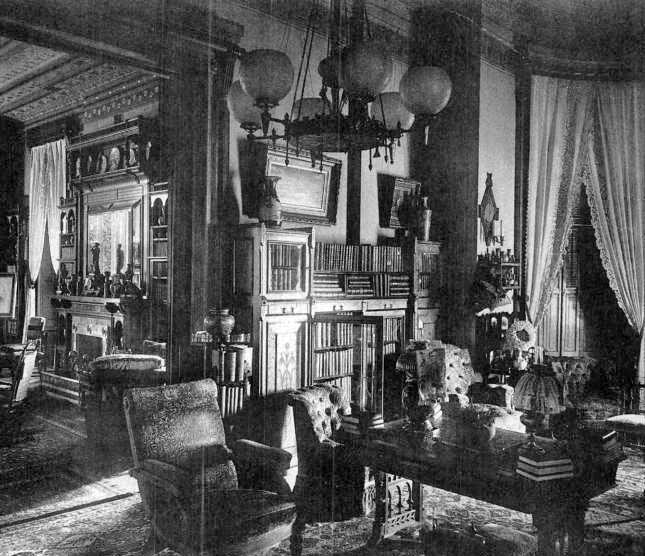
Sitting room and library, as photographed by Edward Bierstadt, 1886.

On the facades, sandstone courses run along the lintel and sill lines. The first story windows are topped with ornate lintels; small rosettes are in the stonework above the second story's sandstone course. At the roofline is a broad overhanging cornice with dentils and voluted brackets. Above the cornice on the south facade bay window is a balcony with wooden balustrade, echoed on the tower. The front porch has a hipped roof supported by two turned wooden columns with balustrades between themselves and the front wall.

The main hall features carved ebony columns in the Eastlake style with a floor of alternating majolica and encaustic tiles. They are complemented by stenciled ceilings, elaborate wooden door enframements and paintings and sculptures. In the sitting room the woodwork includes inlaid sunflower detailing and birdseye maple cabinetry. The parlors have Meissen china figure groups and an Italian marble statue of Faust and Marguerite.

== History ==
There are three eras in Glenview's history: the time leading up to its construction, the Trevors' residence, and the years since then that it has been used as a museum.

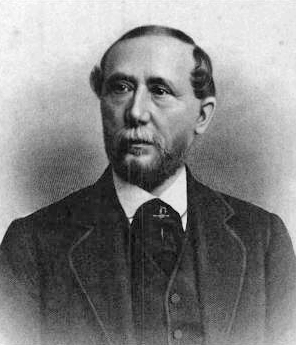
John Bond Trevor

=== 1861–1876: Background and construction ===
Philadelphia native John Bond Trevor, son of former Pennsylvania State Treasurer John B. Trevor, came to work on Wall Street in the 1850s. His career as a banker and stockbroker went well enough for him to move to Yonkers when he married in 1861. At the time the community was becoming attractive as a residence for wealthy financiers who wanted to live on Hudson Valley estates yet remain within commuting distance of their jobs in Manhattan via rail—the beginnings of suburbanization.

Upon first moving to Northwest Yonkers, the Trevors lived at a house on the northwest corner of Glenwood and Ravine avenues, near where the Glenwood train station is today. James B. Colgate, Trevor's business partner, owned the land. There were few other neighbors, as most of the land between Warburton and North Broadway was open and undeveloped, making it attractive to Trevor and businessmen like him.

In 1867 his wife died. After remarrying, he bought the 23 acres (9.3 ha) to the north for $150,000 ($4.54 million in modern dollars) and commissioned Charles W. Clinton, an architect with offices near his in what is today Lower Manhattan, to design a house. Clinton, who had worked under Richard Upjohn earlier in his career, produced a building described even at the time as "not strictly confined to any one style." For the interior finishes he hired some of the accomplished craftsmen of the age, particularly Philadelphia cabinetmaker Daniel Pabst, whose work Trevor or Clinton may have seen at the 1876 Centennial Exposition in Philadelphia, where he won an award for a sideboard. Local builders, some of whom had also attended the exposition, where the newest construction techniques and materials had been exhibited and demonstrated, handled the framing, plumbing and painting. The carpet came from the nearby Alexander Smith Carpet Mills. The house was finished in 1877.

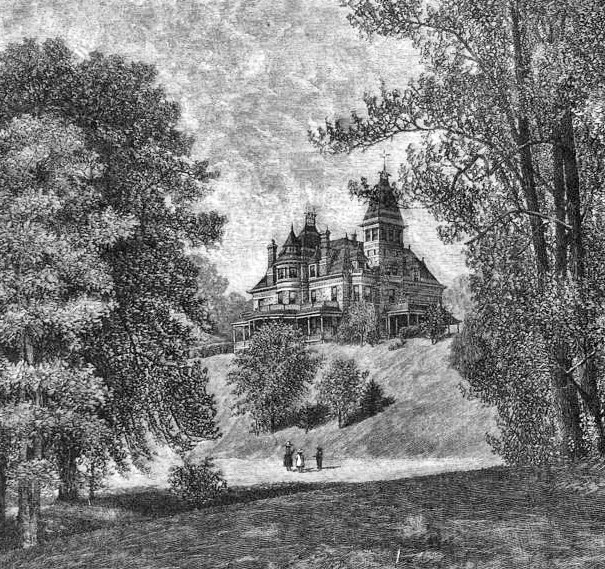
Engraving of Glenview in History of Westchester County

Before building the house, Trevor, who had acquired an interest in horticulture upon his move to Yonkers, developed greenhouses and stables. His choice of land differs from that of most estates in Yonkers at the time, such as his friends the Shonnards to the north, which were built higher up the hill with all the land straight down to the river, rather than at its edge, where the railroad cut off direct river access and passing trains occasionally spoiled the view and created a fire hazard. Trevor's theoretical second parcel just offshore could have been developed, but again the railroad's presence made that unlikely. He may have preferred to remain near his partner, the station and the facilities he had already built. Indeed, he put the property's gates on Ravine to the south, rather than Warburton, which was closest to the house but unpaved, since Ravine was a short distance from the station.

Trevor had been active in the community, serving as a presidential elector and chairing meetings of the local Republican Party. Therefore, the house attracted much notice in the local newspapers, as one of the first large houses built in the area since the Panic of 1873 had depressed the economy. It was called a "showplace" for Yonkers, incorporated as a city just five years earlier, in 1872. In 1886 it was one of 12 Yonkers homes selected for engraved illustrations in Thomas Scharf's History of Westchester County, which has since become a standard reference work for historians.

=== 1876–1922: As residence ===
Throughout those years, Trevor lived the life of a gentleman farmer, commuting to Wall Street daily. The family wintered in the city, and sometimes went to the Catskills during the hot stretches of the summer. He was close friends with neighbors like Samuel J. Tilden, formerly governor of New York and Democratic candidate for president in the controversial 1876 election, lawyer William Allen Butler and rail magnate Colgate Hoyt. Guests at Glenview included Civil War generals Nelson Miles and William Tecumseh Sherman, who suggested the eventual renaming of the Trevors' former residence, Edgewater, to Seven Pines after the battle.

John B. Trevor, Sr., Trevor's youngest son, recalls the times of his childhood at Glenview as a "paradise." He and Colgate Hoyt's son Sherman, his only neighbor around his age, often played together with the Wiffler sons and his older half-brother. The nearby river played a prominent role in their play. Henry Trevor joined the Yonkers Yacht Club, where he and other members raced as far upriver as Rondout Creek, at Kingston. In the 1890s John and his sisters began to take up golf, another new pastime of the Gilded Age rich. They all took up bicycling as well, and one of the sisters, Emily, became an avid bicyclist as well, once riding as far away as Hastings-on-Hudson and Riverdale.

John Bond Trevor died in 1890, with John Wiffler, the gardener he had collaborated with on the property, retiring two years later to open a feed store in downtown Yonkers. The family continued to live in Glenview. Mary Trevor's wedding reception there in 1892 was widely covered by both the local and New York newspapers. A special train brought guests from the city to the ceremony at St. John's Episcopal Church downtown and back from the mansion. The flowers came from the estate's greenhouses.

Trevor's widow continued to live at Glenview with her children as they grew up. Her daughter Emily kept a diary which provides most of what is known about Glenview as the 19th century became the 20th. She attended boarding school in the city but returned for holidays and vacations. Her reminiscences are often of visiting friends or family, and trips to New York City or, as she referred to it, the village of Yonkers, then a mile (1.6 km) away. During the first decade of the new century these trips started to be taken by car instead of the train or carriage. This reflected not only the increasing use of the automobile but the New York Central Railroad's electrification project for the line, which not only disrupted service but required the building of the large power plant that, now unused, still sits on the river shoreline near the current Glenwood station, which still uses the 1911 station building.

After his wedding in 1908, John moved out while his mother and sister remained at the house. He visited frequently enough with his own children, particularly in the summertime, to be described as a resident in his mother's obituary in 1922. His son John B. Trevor, Jr., recalled in the last years of his own life that by that point, the billiards room was used primarily as the children's dining room, with the billiards table covered with a tablecloth. The parlor and library were rarely used. Emily said later that she and her aging mother "lived a very quiet life" at Glenview during the 1910s.

The neighborhood around them had changed considerably since the house was built. Back in 1875, the year before Glenview's construction began, the Shonnards had subdivided their property to the north and east of the estate. In the years since, those lots had been sold and slowly developed with houses similar to, but smaller than, Glenview. Often their proximity to the Trevors' home was used as a selling point. By the time of Emily Trevor's death, this evolution from country town to modern suburb was almost complete, and so the family decided to sell the house as none of them wanted to live there anymore due to those changes.

=== 1922–present: As museum ===
The city of Yonkers bought the house and grounds from the family with the intent of using the land as a public park. Trevor Park was established soon afterwards. The house stood vacant for six years until it was opened as the Museum of Science and Art, with the collection established at Yonkers City Hall in 1919 for future historical use. In 1948 it became the Hudson River Museum, renting the house and the land from the city for $1 a year.

During these years, the exterior was altered somewhat by the removal of the porte-cochère and verandas. Inside, the mantelpieces were removed. The front door's transom was taken out so that a stuffed elephant from the Barnum & Bailey Circus could be brought in. The rooms were used as exhibit halls and their finishings neglected.

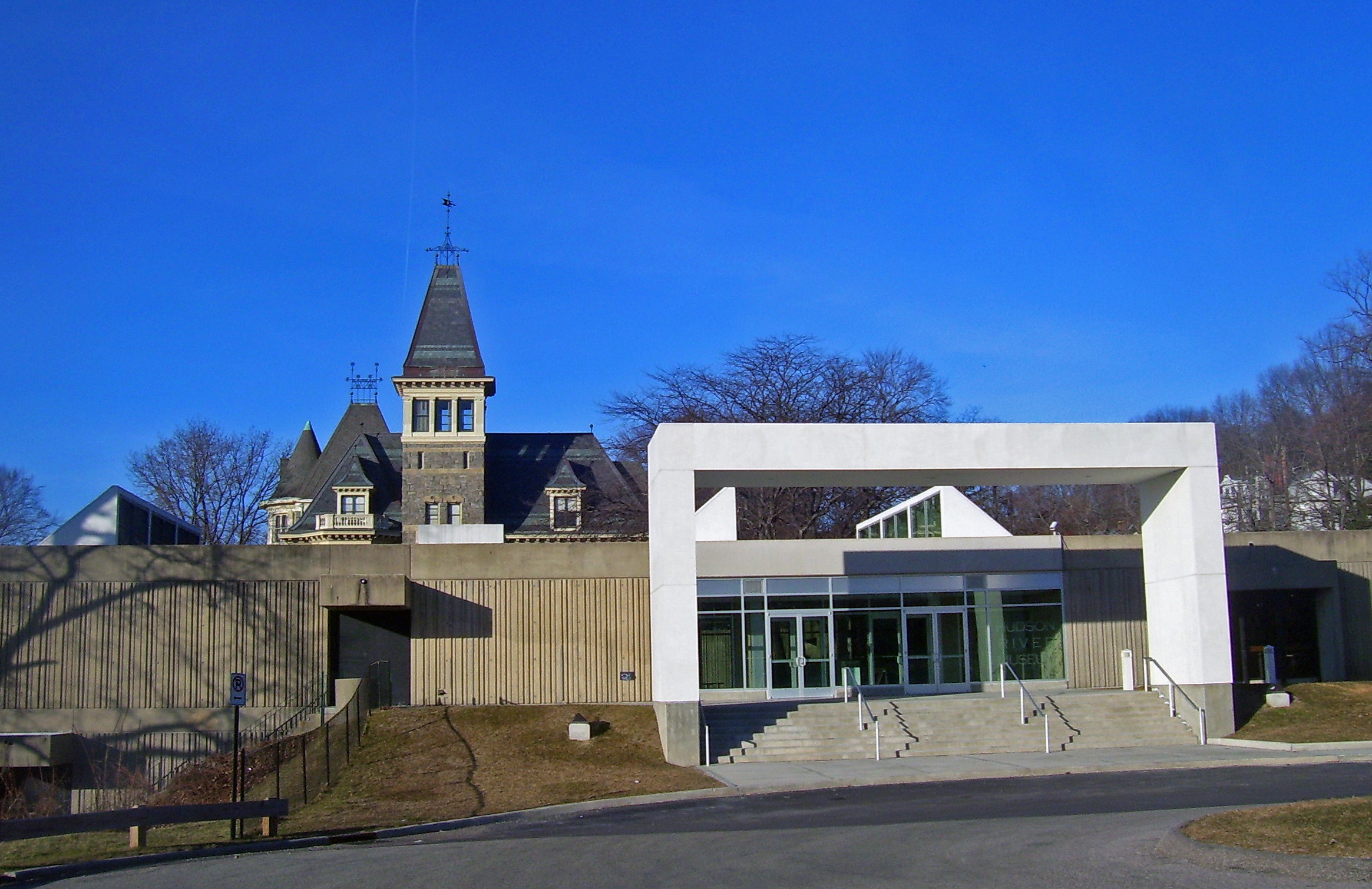
Glenview with 1969 museum entrance, 2009

In 1967 the museum decided it needed more space and commissioned a $1.5 million ($13.2 million in modern dollars), 25,000-square-foot (2,300 m^{2}) addition with a planetarium in the brutalist style popular at the time. It was completed two years later. In addition to being a stark contrast to the house, it enclosed it within a courtyard, restricting the view of its first story. The front entrance, with barred doors, was later compared to a prison. An elevator was installed in the mansion and its rooms were restored to focus on the house's history and how the Trevors lived.

Three decades later, in the first years of the 21st century, the museum began raising money to upgrade both of its facilities as part of a $14 million expansion. The first phases called for better integrating and connecting Glenview and the 1969 structure. A breezeway between the two was enclosed, and a 115-foot (35 m) corridor was built between the facilities to connect to a planned new elevator on the outside. The changes, the museum's director explained, were necessary to comply with federal accessibility laws yet preserve the building's historic character.

== Aesthetics ==
Trevor and Clinton had worked together closely and put considerable thought into the design of the house, since Trevor designed the surrounding landscaping and wanted it to be compatible. Windows were carefully situated for how they framed the view of the river and landscape. Clinton's stylistic choices were truly eclectic. One of Yonkers's newspapers described the house as old English in style while the other said it "par[took] rather of the French château character." The rough-hewn stone facing echoes the nearby Greystone and Rosemont mansions, which Trevor may have commended to the architect as examples since Clinton had up to then primarily designed urban houses. Greystone's tower may have inspired the one Clinton built on the Seventh Regiment Armory on Park Avenue in Manhattan a year after Glenview was finished.

The inside reflected changes in house design that would later become common in suburban residences. In an urban house, rooms would have been stretched out to the back along the floor due to spatial limitations on the sides. As a result, the dining room and kitchen were in the rear since they could be on the same floor. A pantry connected them so service need not go through the public areas of the house.

In Glenview, the parlor and billiards room were on the east of the great entrance hall, while the library and other rooms more used by the family than visitors were on the west to allow them to enjoy the river view. Between the dining room and library was the sitting room, opening onto the large veranda, called a "piazza" at the time, that was originally attached to that side of the house. Another wide veranda, with a porte-cochère, was originally attached to the south as well.

In addition to allowing views of the river on warm evenings, the verandas also helped cool the house. They insulated the adjacent sections of the house, and allowed for an intermediate area between the less-ventilated house and the unshaded outdoors on hot days. They and the other areas of the first floor were amply furnished with reclining chairs and rockers, reflecting the construction of the house with leisure in mind. On the second story, the master bedroom occupied the southwest corner, not only to take in the river but to take advantage of the southern exposure, difficult to get in many Manhattan houses.

Since his move to Yonkers, Trevor had worked with gardener John Wiffler on the property. Once Glenview had been built, Wiffler moved in with his family to the superintendent's cottage. The two planted 200 evergreens around the house and grounds, and orange and lemon trees in front. Trevor threw himself quite passionately into his hobby, growing prize specimens and developing new breeds. In 1883 the estate's Black Hamburg grapes won first premium at the autumn meeting of the New York Horticulture Society. His grandson recalled later that the potting shed was "simply lined with awards" for the flowers, and his copper-colored "Glenview mum" was sold in Manhattan.

== Neighborhood ==
The house is located on the grounds of the Hudson River Museum, just north of its poured concrete brutalist main building. It forms the north wall of the building's central courtyard. The entire complex is on the west side of Warburton just north of Trevor Park and south of John F. Kennedy Memorial Drive, which curves to the west of the museum as well. The ground slopes steadily westward to the tracks of the Metro-North Hudson Line 300 feet (100 m) to the west, along the shore of the Hudson River. Metro-North's Glenwood station is a thousand feet (300 m) to the south along the line. Across the river there is a view of the stone cliffs of the Palisades in New Jersey.

Across Warburton to the east are two-story 20th-century houses. Behind them runs the Old Croton Aqueduct, a National Historic Landmark, and its trailway. A modern high-rise building is to the west across Memorial Drive. A small parking lot, for museum employees, is to the immediate north. On the south, Trevor Park is a mostly open area, with the museum's entrance road on the east, two baseball diamonds and tennis courts. To its south are more modern high-rise apartment buildings.

== See also ==
- List of Gilded Age mansions
- National Register of Historic Places listings in Yonkers, New York
