= Pelton Mill =

- U.S. National Register of Historic Places
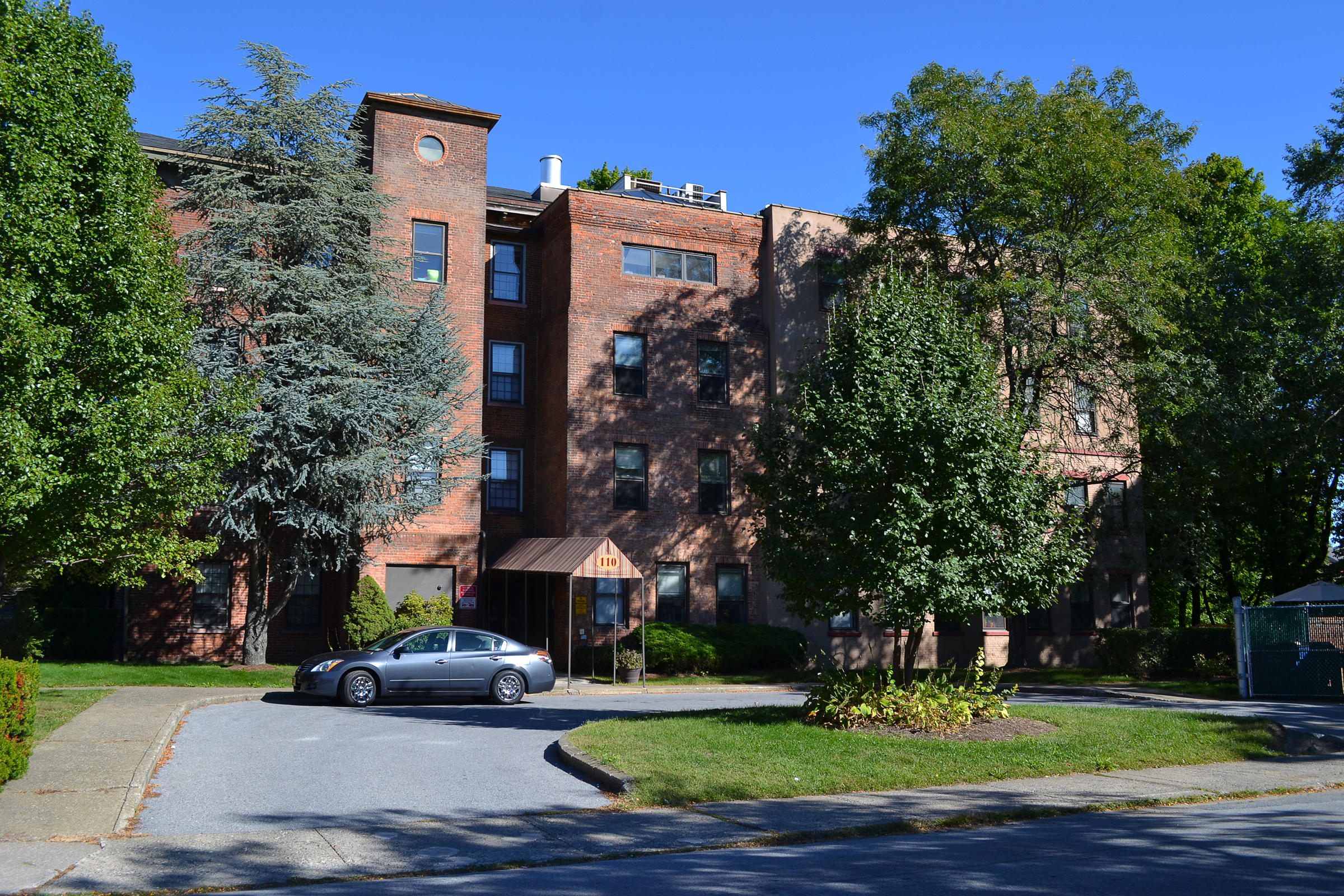
- The mill in September 2015, now re-purposed as apartments

- Location within New York Location within the United States
- Location: 110 Mill St., Poughkeepsie, New York
- Coordinates: 41°42′30″N 73°56′11″W
- Area: 0.1 acres (0.040 ha)
- Built: 1834
- MPS: Poughkeepsie MRA
- NRHP reference No.: 82001156
- Added to NRHP: November 26, 1982

Pelton Mill is a historic carpet mill located at Poughkeepsie, Dutchess County, New York. It was built about 1834 and rebuilt after the fire of 1854. It is a 4 1/2-story, three-bay brick building with a gable roof.

It was added to the National Register of Historic Places in 1982.

== See also ==
- Alexander Smith Carpet Mills Historic District: historic carpet factory complex in Yonkers, New York
