= John Bond Trevor =

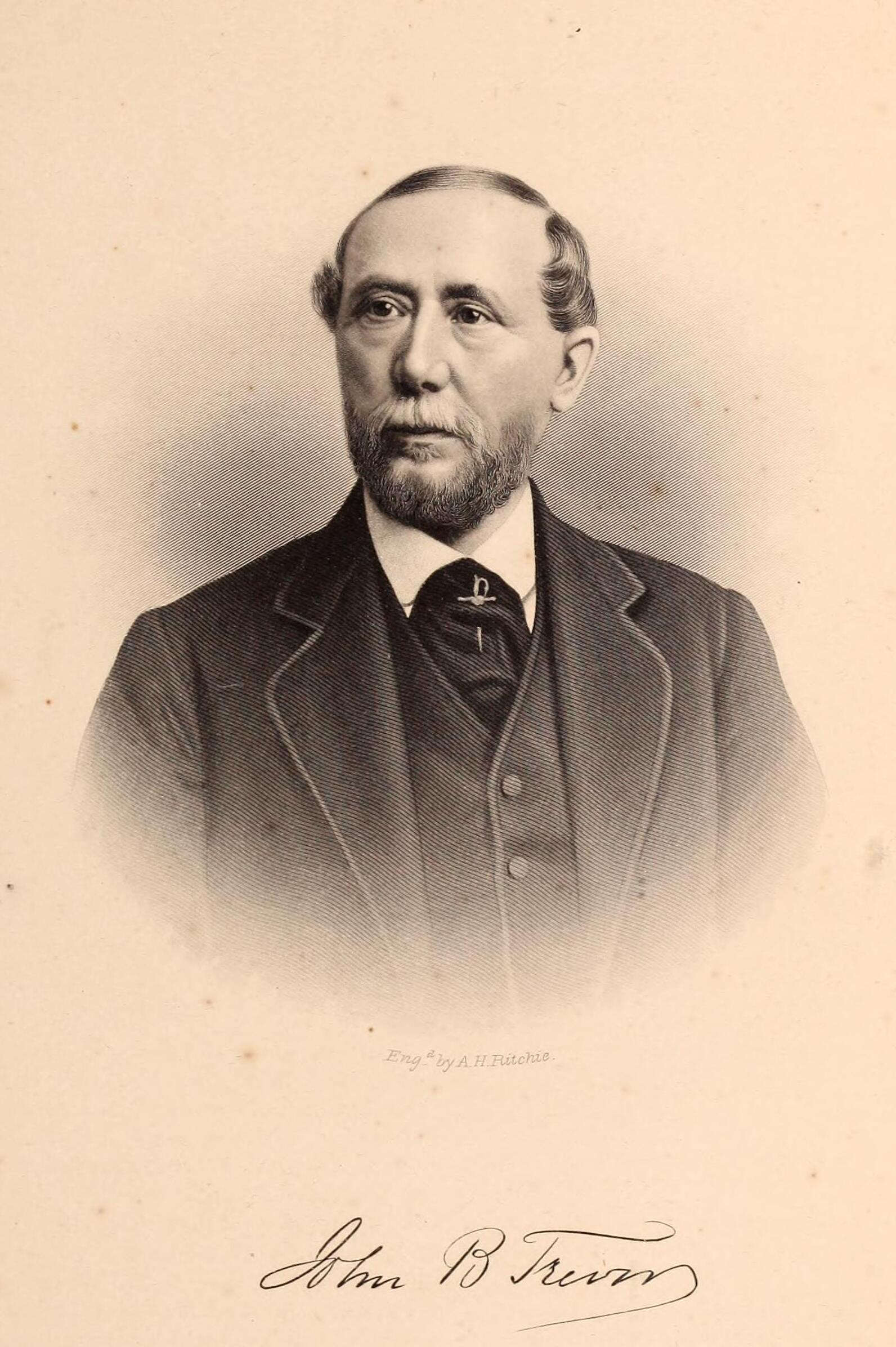
- Engraving c.1886
- Born: 1822; Philadelphia, Pennsylvania
- Died: 1890 (aged 67–68); Yonkers, New York
- Occupation: Financier
- Known for: Political involvement; building Glenview Mansion

John Bond Trevor (1822–1890) was an American financier and Wall Street pioneer. Born in Philadelphia, Pennsylvania, he moved to New York City in 1849. In 1850 he became a member of the New York Stock Exchange and entered into brokerage with the firm of Carpenter, Van Dyke & Trevor. That venture was dissolved in 1852 when he formed a partnership with James Boorman Colgate. The firm Trevor & Colgate existed until 1872, at which time it was reformed under the name James B. Colgate & Co. Trevor continued as partner of this firm until his death in 1890.

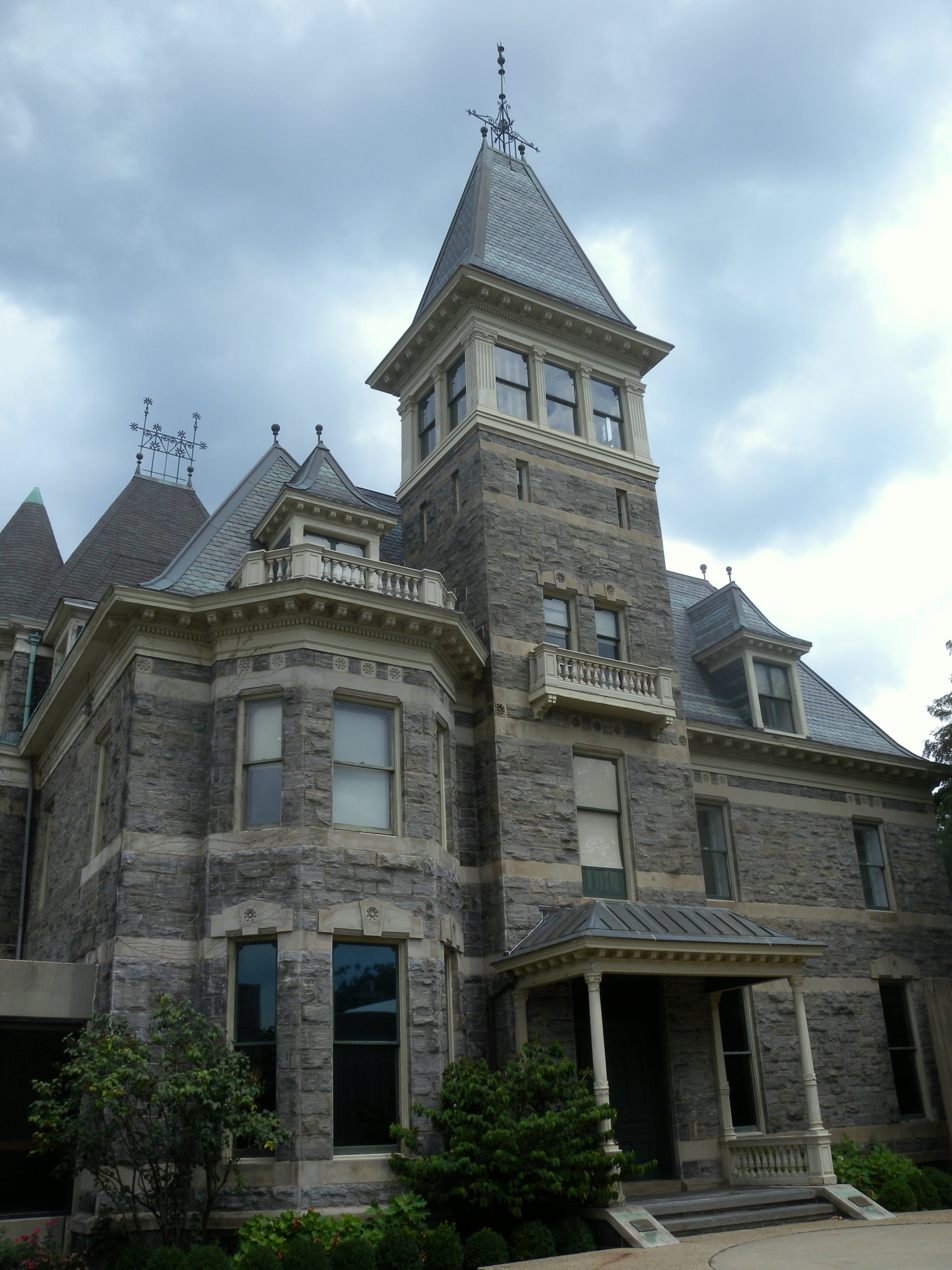
Glenview Mansion

In 1877, he built Glenview Mansion in Yonkers, New York. This residence stands today as part of the Hudson River Museum. Trevor was a Presidential Elector in 1880 and was for a time a director of the Northern Pacific Railway.

His father, John B. Trevor (1788-1860), was Pennsylvania Treasurer from 1820 to 1821.

His son John B. Trevor Sr. (1878-1956) was an American lawyer and political activist.
