= YoHo Artist Community =

The YoHo Artist Community is a community of artists out of the two Alexander Smith Carpet Mills Historic District buildings, located at 540 and 578 Nepperhan Avenue in Yonkers, New York. Its membership has grown to more than 80 working artists since 2005.

== History ==
The Alexander Smith Carpet Mills Historic District buildings originally housed the Alexander Smith and Sons Carpet Company. The entire complex consisted of 38 acres with more than 40 buildings. Alexander Smith and Sons was in operation in Yonkers. During the Great Depression, it was agreed that employees' hours would be cut, but jobs were not. In the mid-1950s, the Yonkers plant shut down entirely; an estimated 5,000 workers were without jobs. The stronghold along Nepperhan Avenue and the Saw Mill River, and within the Yonkers community, was suddenly empty.

With the deindustrialization of cities came the abandonment of buildings. In this case, most of the 40-building complex stood empty for nearly 20 years. The two loft buildings that house the YoHo community were purchased in 1978 by Allan Eisenkraft of Yonkers Industrial Development Corporation, who spent a total of about $4.5 million in renovations. The buildings were then rented out to small businesses. The lower floors still operate in this manner. The buildings were listed on the National Register of Historic Places by the United States Department of the Interior in 1983.

In 1986, Debra Sherwood was looking for an artist loft space. She was a sculptor relocating from Seattle to New York City. Industrial building floors for rent were advertised by Yonkers Industrial Development Corporation. After contacting the realtor, Sherwood agreed to lease the fifth floor of the building. She named the space YoHo Studios for "Yonkers above Houston". YoHo studios had four open studio events before 1991. In the early 1990s, artists began to occupy the Westchester artist studios located within the former Alexander Smith and Sons Carpet Company Mills.

== Members and works ==
Among the artists that rent or have rented space at YoHo are producers of murals, collages, sculptures, mixed media, and portraits. While the population is made up of primarily visual artists, specifically painters, there has also been a sculptor, a tattoo artist, and a former member of the Orange County Choppers, a creator of custom motorcycle graphics. During the scheduled "open studio" events, members allow the community access to their private studios. The Great Hall on the fifth floor is a gallery-like space where the artwork is displayed. Those areas, as well as the private studios, use the buildings' 14–16-foot ceilings.

The community has earned recognition from New York State Senator Andrea Stewart-Cousins. State Senator Stewart-Cousins deemed April 18, 2009, to be "YoHo Artist Studios Day". The mayor of the city of Yonkers, Phil Amicone, issued a dedicated day to the community as well.

In early 2011, the owners began the creation of 25 new spaces that would occupy a fourth-floor wing. By early 2014, all spaces were occupied, along with the original 50+ studios at 540 and 578 Nepperhan Avenue. In early 2014, the owners and developers of YoHo began collaborating with proprietors of neighboring buildings of the historic carpet mills to create Yonkers's first official arts district.
