= Eastlake movement =

Architectural movement

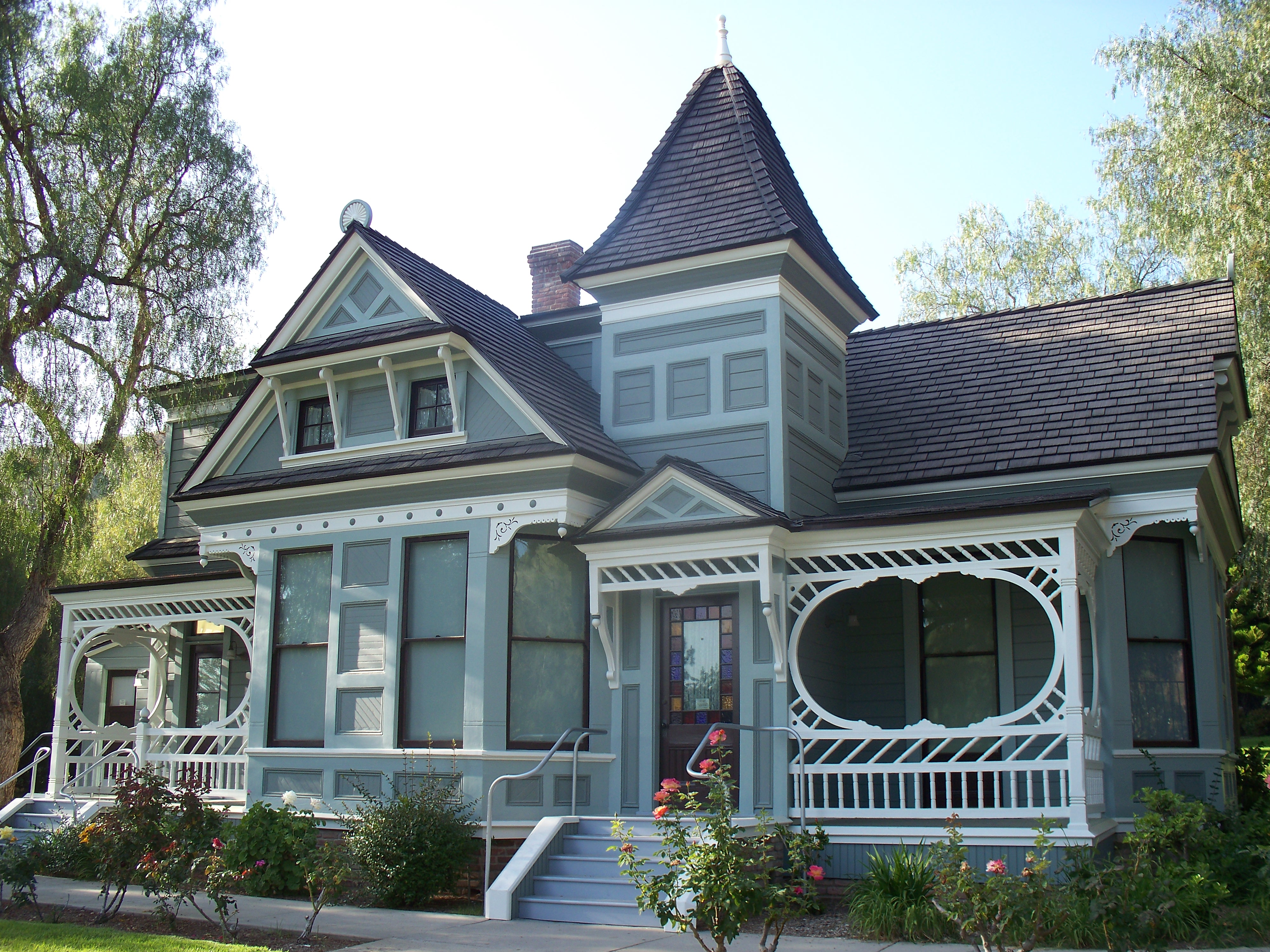
An example of the Eastlake Style in Glendale, California

The Eastlake movement was a nineteenth-century architectural and household design reform movement, which although started by the British architect and writer Charles Eastlake (1836–1906), was essentially a North American phenomenon. The movement is generally considered part of the late Victorian period in terms of broad antique furniture designations. In architecture the Eastlake style or Eastlake architecture is part of the Queen Anne style of Victorian architecture.

Eastlake's book Hints on Household Taste in Furniture, Upholstery, and Other Details posited that furniture and decor in people's homes should be made by hand or machine workers who took personal pride in their work. Manufacturers in the United States used the drawings and ideas in the book to create mass-produced Eastlake Style or Cottage furniture.

The geometric ornaments, spindles, low relief carvings, and incised lines were designed to be affordable and easy to clean; nevertheless, many of the designs which resulted are artistically complex.

Although Charles Eastlake did not build furniture himself, he spent his years designing furniture to be built by professional cabinetmakers, among other artistic endeavors. The movement he created influenced the interior design of American homes with English designs that were easy to clean, functional, and simple. The ‘Eastlake’ style is of Victorian architecture and one of the core principles of this style was that Eastlake thought that the furniture in people's homes should be good looking and be made by manufacturers who enjoyed their work. This was contrary to the previous style of furniture, with pieces that were large, heavy, and thick, and that collected dust and germs.

== History ==
Eastlake movement was named after the English architect Charles Locke Eastlake (nephew of Sir Charles Lock Eastlake) following the release of his influential book Hints on Household Taste in Furniture, Upholstery and Other Details. Eastlake was originally a painter who trained in Rome and was considered to have great knowledge in art; however, he had a specific preference.

In Hints on Household Taste in Furniture, Upholstery and Other Details, Eastlake promoted Victorian style furniture which had opposed the curved features of the French Baroque Revival Styles. Instead, Eastlake style had "angular, notched and carved" features and although he did not produce any furniture himself, cabinet makers produced them. His book influenced custom designers as well as machine-made manufacturers who Eastlake abhorred. His quote "I find American tradesmen continually advertising what they are pleased to call Eastlake furniture, the production of which I have had nothing whatever to do, and for the taste of which I should be very sorry to be considered responsible" shows his stance on this.

This influence later led to the Eastlake movement in the United States where Eastlake style furniture were being produced for the middle-class. It was known to be affordable while also being handcrafted and easy to clean which shows the transformative nature of Eastlake's ideas to furniture.

== Characteristics ==
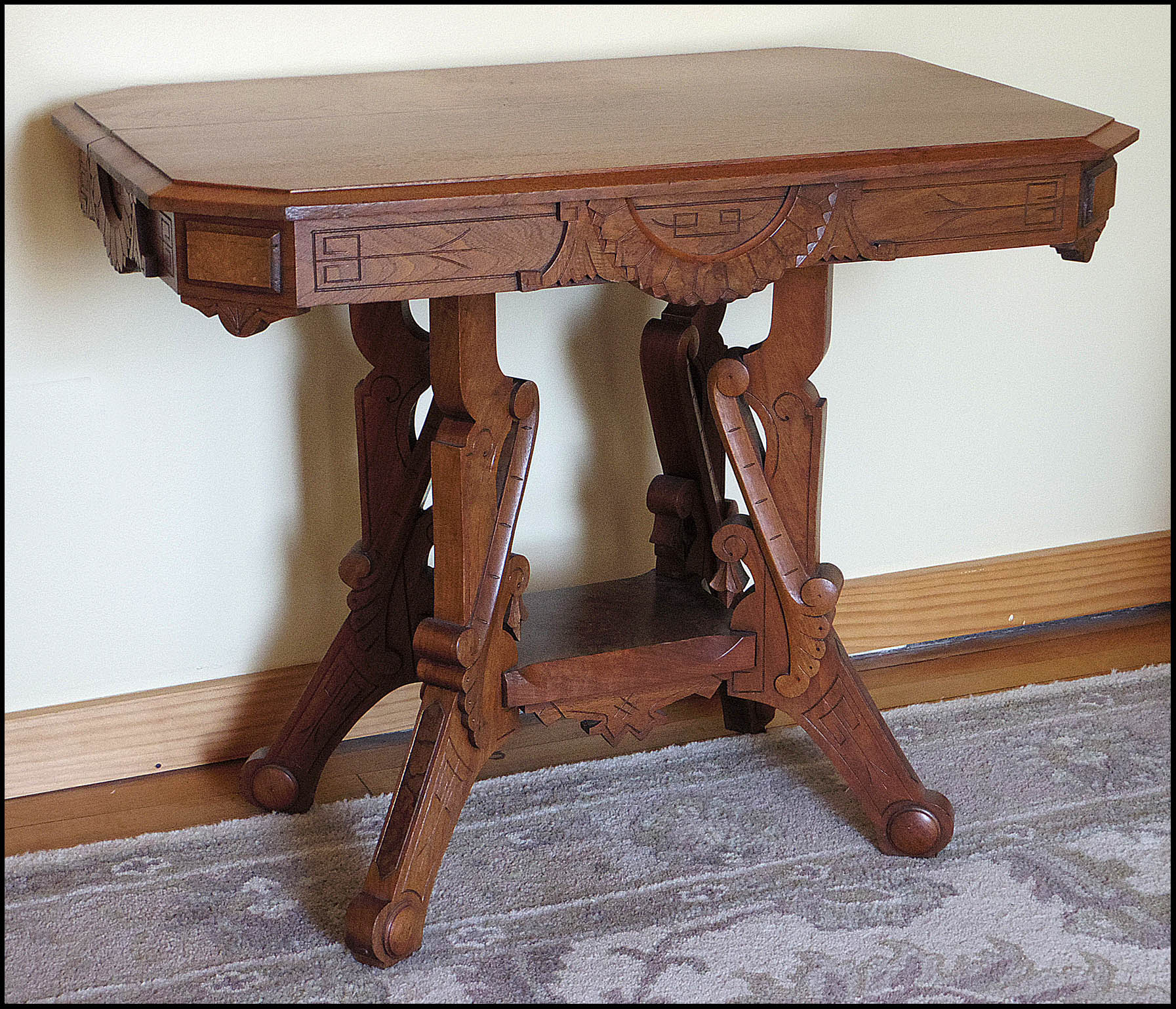
Eastlake style table by Burr Brothers, circa 1885

Eastlake style applied to houses as well as furniture. Characteristics of these houses include the lathe-shaped wooden forms and mechanical jigsaw wooden forms. Porch posts and railings had intricate wooden designs, and curved brackets and scrolls were placed at corners. The façade also included "perforated gables and pediments, carved panels and a profusion of beaded spindles, and lattice work found along porch eaves." Mansardic porches were another characteristic and had wrought iron crestings. The color combination of the houses also emphasized the contrast between the lighter colors of the details and the darker colors of the house body. In the United States, especially in California, American home builders in the 1880s replaced flat-cut gingerbread ornamental elements that were popular in the 1860s and 1870s with lathe-tuned spindlework for balusters and wall surface decoration. Charles Eastlake criticized the American adaptation as "extravagant and bizarre". However, the style lived on and it was later combined with Italianate and Second Empire elements to create the "San Francisco Style".

In furniture, Eastlake was particularly fond of oak and cherry wood grains; however, American manufacturers still used ebonized wood despite Eastlake's suggestions. The forms of the furniture were often rectilinear and had "geometric ornament, turnings, brackets, trestles, and incised linear decoration." Additionally, the designs were easily made by machines. Eastlake also believed that the prices of his furniture should be "as cheap as that which is ugly" as he could not understand why anyone would buy a more expensive piece of furniture for a more intricate design. Eastlake's furniture was for the middle-class home, and being easy to clean was another one of the characteristics.

== Gallery ==
=== William S. Clark House ===
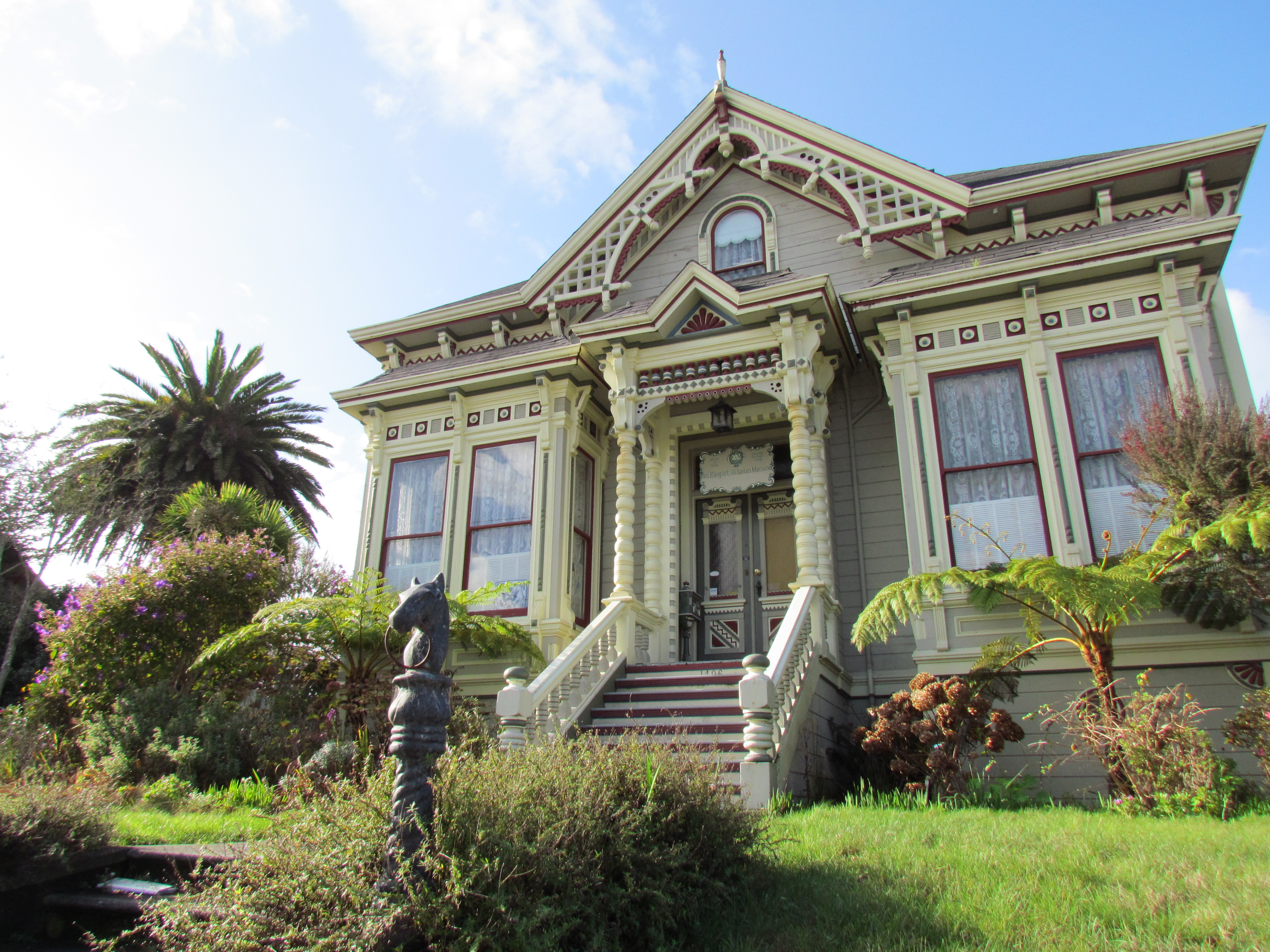
William S. Clark House

One example of an Eastlake movement building is William S. Clark House in Eureka, California. The house was built in 1888 and contains "an elaborately decorated entrance porch, flanking square bays, side slant bays, and roof gables". Eastlake ornamentation can be seen in the bays, gables, windows, frieze, and porch. The entrance is decorated with spools, sunbursts, holes, buttons, brackets, scallops, and pierced cylinders, and is supported by large chamfered columns. The glass planes of the recessed double doors are decorated with panels above and below. The square and slant bays contain brackets, panels, moldings, and buttons. The gables contain a grillwork of stickwork, knobs, bevelled sticks, and pierced scallops that hang from the edge of the roof. The gable bracing of William S. Clark House is untraditional as most gable bracings of Eastlake Style would connect to the edge of the roof. The gable bracing instead hangs from the edge which provides shadows on the house wall. The frieze contains vertical and zigzag bevelled sticks, and pierced and chamfered brackets that surround the cornice. Below the bays, the corners of the stringcourse are filled by bevelled sunbursts. The slant bays have side porches that extend to the back of the house and there is a rear hall that connects the house with a storage/laundry annex at the back of the property. On the north side of the house, there are small, squared windows on either side of the round headed window, which create a Palladian effect.

The entrance hall, double parlors, and dining rooms are significant in that the décor and character is preserved. The unpainted windows and stairway banister have natural wood finishes that have darkened over time. The doors, stairway panels below the railing, and dining room wainscoting have the same 19th century oak graining. The wallpapers, picture railings, period furnishings, and potted ferns are in the same style as the Victorian features of the interior. In the fireplaces in the rear parlor, family room, and dining room, there are highly polished, hardwood mantels above small fireplaces. Mirrors, polished tiles, and intricate shelves extend close to the picture railing. The entrance hall stairway has a banister and a light-topped newel post leading to the second-floor hallway which is surrounded by another open-work banister. There is a contrast between the white-painted woodwork and light embossed wallpaper with the darker woodwork and paper of the parlors and dining room. The doors upstairs are painted and panelled and each has a glass of transom above. The bathroom still has an old pull-chain tank toilet and the bath has an old clawfoot tub.

=== Winters House ===
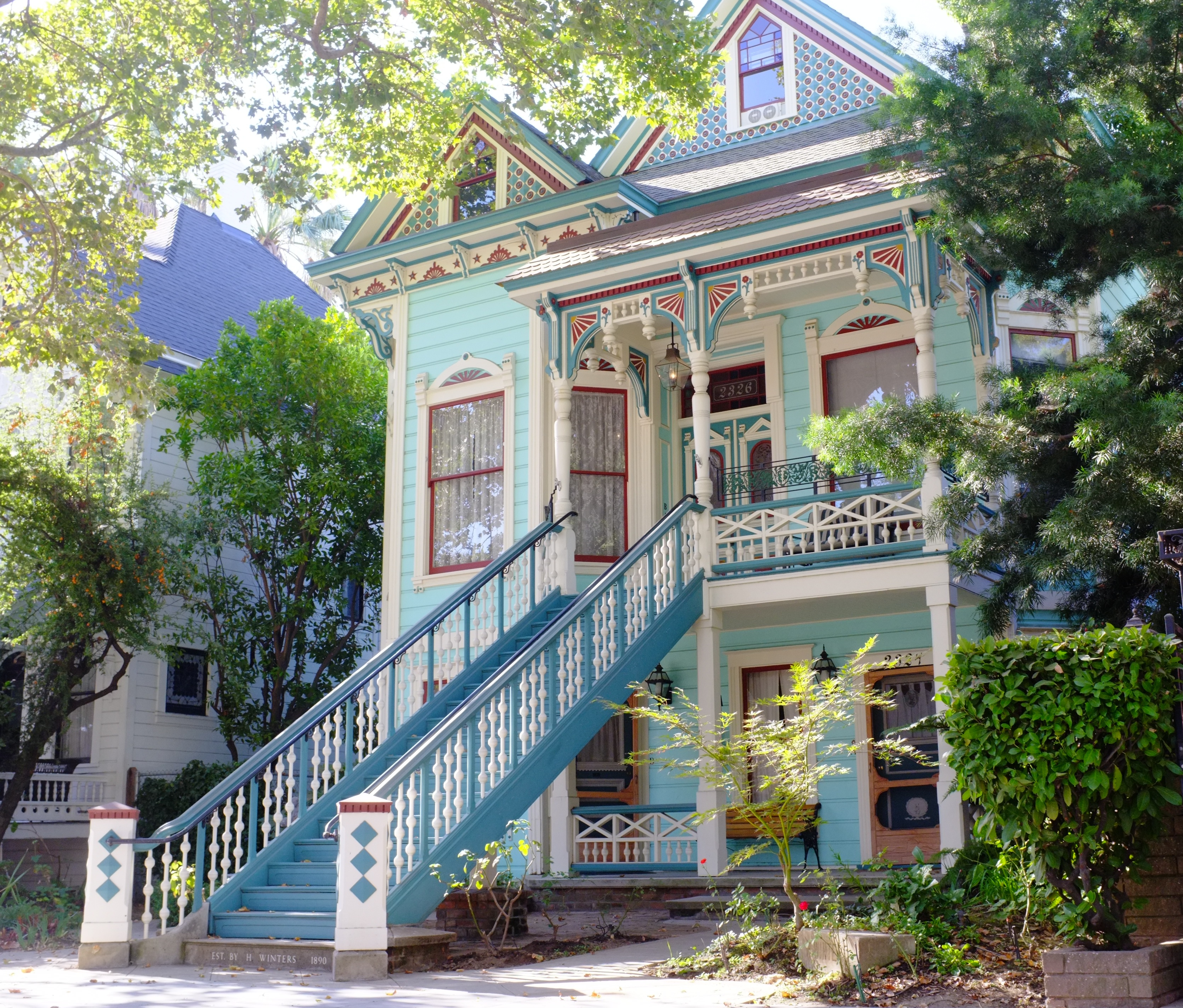
Winters House

Winters House is an Eastlake movement-building in Sacramento, California and was built in 1890. It has 3 stories and is approximately 4500 square feet. Some exterior features of the house include ornamental details, such as "sunburst pediments, a frieze of scrollwork sunbursts, dentil work in the gables, a mansard porch canopy, and a decorative balustrade with spindles and stick work. " The house has not had any significant deviations from the original design, materials and workmanship.

The characteristics of Winters House can be seen in the "steel pitched hip and gable roof, asymmetrical front façade, two-story angled bay under forward gable, mansard front porch and second story bay windows on both sides of the house". The roof of the house made of asphalt shingles and the walls are made from pattern siding covered heart redwood. The foundation of the building is a cement parged brick stem wall and the decorative brick chimneys are part of a coal burning fuel system. The interior of the house reflects the Eastlake style in the mantel spindles, the ornate tile work surrounding the two fireplaces, 12-foot second story coved ceilings and other details. The wall cladding in the main house is a horizontal shiplap with vertical lapboard. All of the windows are framed with grooved vertical moulding and other trim work, such as sunbursts above the second story windows. Below the cornice, the house also has a frieze board which includes scrollwork sunbursts and stars. In the front porch, above the front doors are cut window panels in jewel tones. The porch has a framing of fans, flowers, dentils, and spindlework. The spindlework and stickwork is repeated from the upper porch to the lower porch balustrade.

=== Thomas F. Ricks House ===
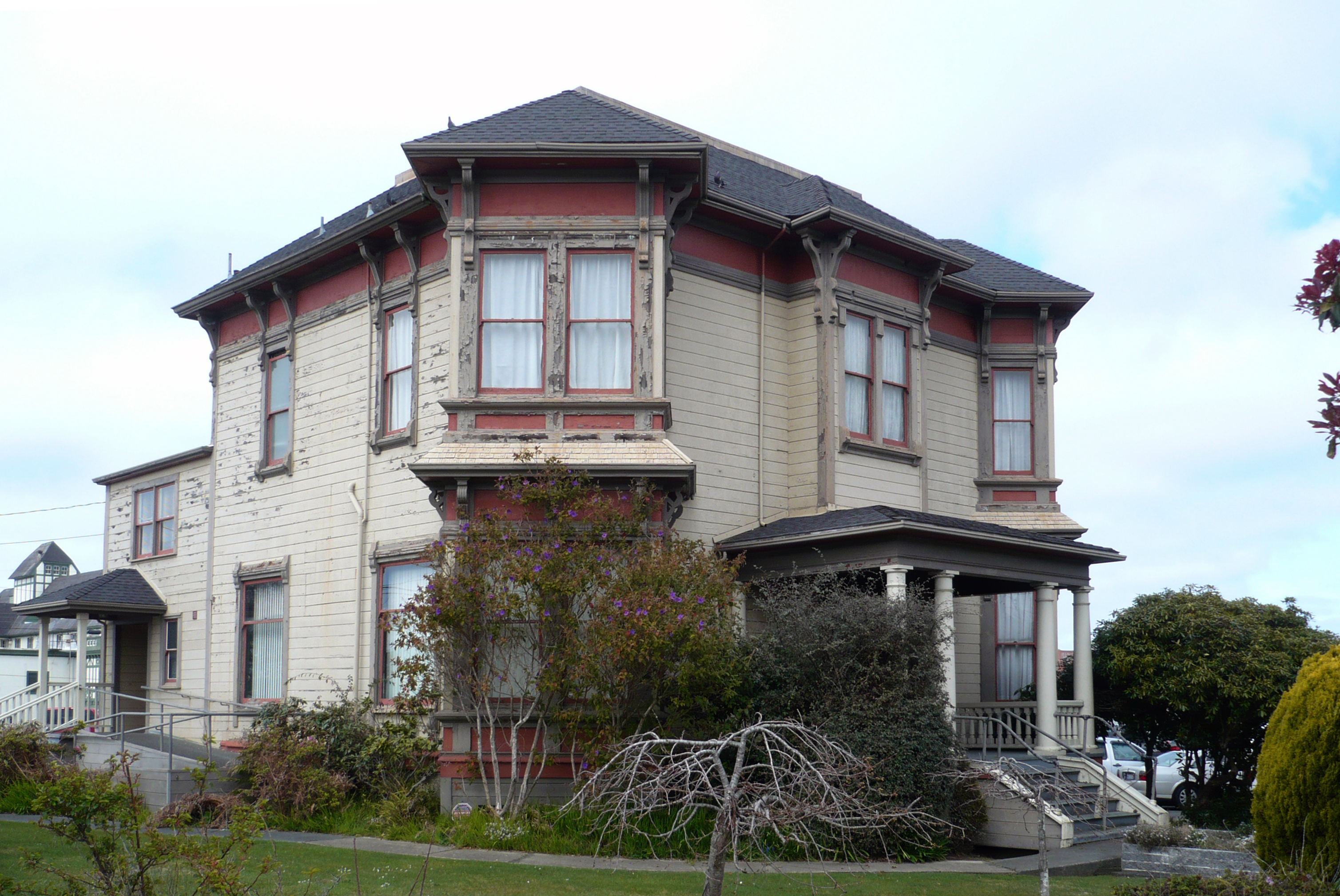
Thomas F. Ricks House

Thomas F. Ricks House is an Eastlake movement-building in Eureka, California. It was built in 1885 and in Eureka, the building is the most prominent example of Eastlake style. The building had several renovations to parts of the building, leading to the interior having a mixture of period styles. Many of the interior millwork were replaced during the hospital renovation in 1907 and in 1952 the dining room and kitchen were constructed in the style of that year. On the second floor, there are two Eastlake style bedrooms that have been unchanged.

The entry hall of Thomas F. Ricks House contains a recessed ceiling panel that is outlined with molding ornamented with modillions. A bead course is used for decoration for the staircase newel post and squared balusters have a simple railing. The entry to the living rooms are double pocket doors and the living room ceiling is surrounded with box molding and underneath it, a picture rail. The floor is a carpeted hardwood floor with a plain 12-inch baseboard and all other rooms contain the same floor and ceiling finishes with a few variations in the walls. The Victorian rooms’ surrounds had bullseye corner blocks and lower ceiling finishes. The building is unique in that in Eureka, it is the only two-story building that is symmetrical with squared bay windows. Other Eastlake features of the house include: "the vertical stripes in the frieze, the brackets extending from the vertical strips, the narrow belt course, the cornice and brackets over the windows, and the wide band of trim under the cornice".

== Spread in the United States ==
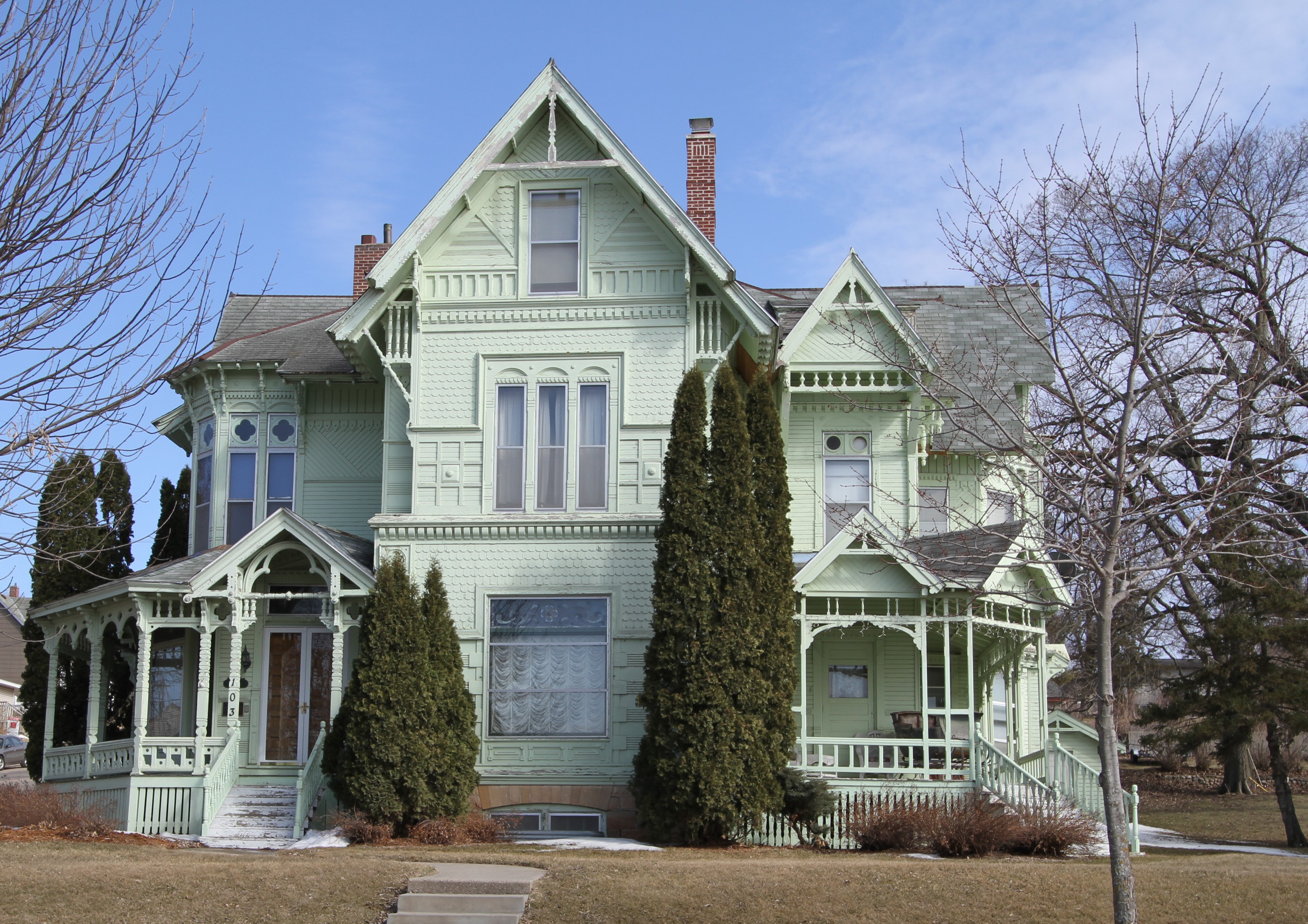
Eastlake style home in Le Sueur, Minnesota

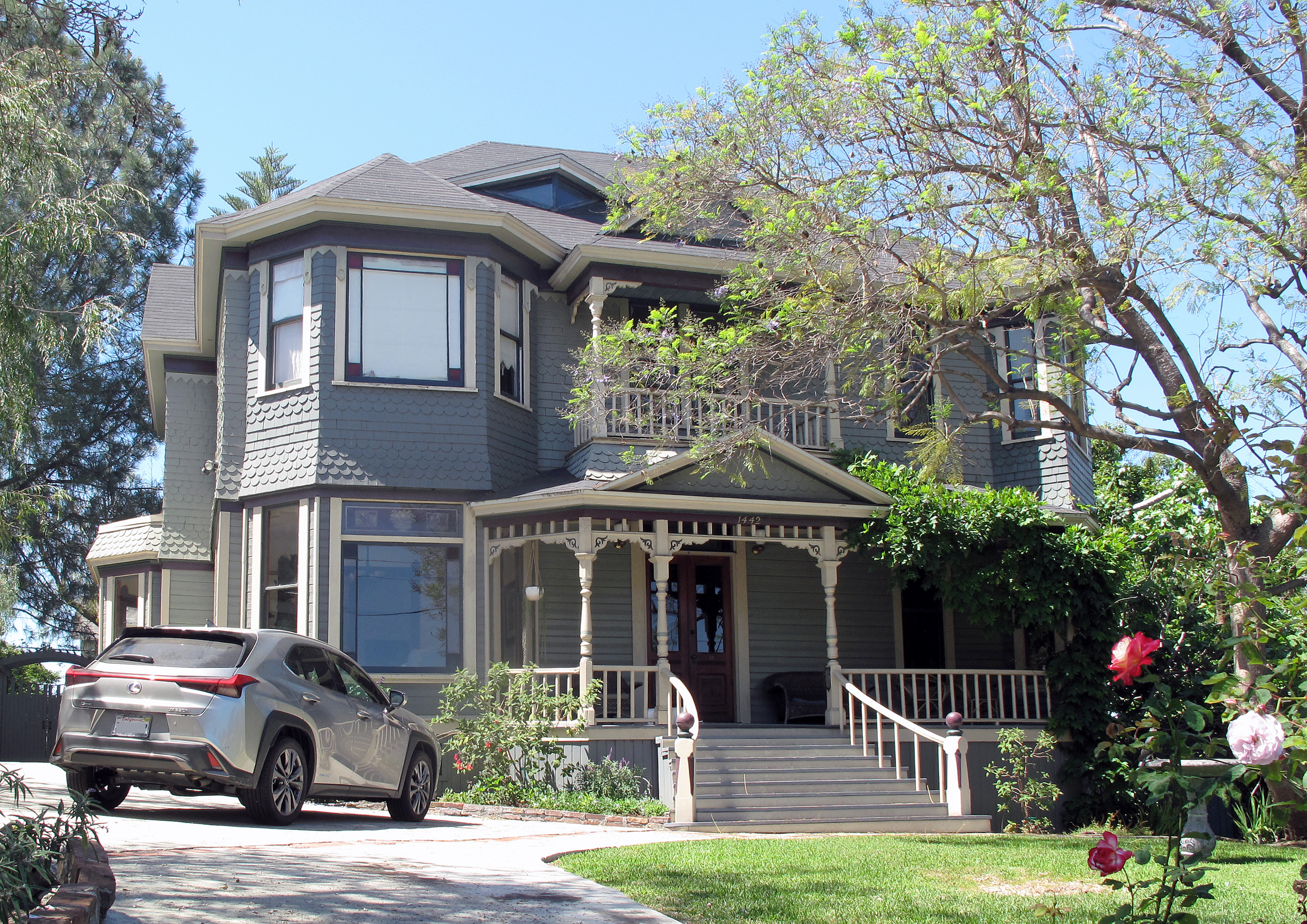
An Eastlake style building in Los Angeles, California

Although Eastlake's book Hints on Household Taste in Furniture, Upholstery and Other Details was originally released in England and was positively received, its influence was greater in the United States. The book was reprinted four times in England and six times in the United States. However, following the Civil War, the middle class desired a design reform due to the increasing awareness of the English movement. In England, Eastlake was one of many who desired a design reform, but in America his simplicity and taste were exposed to "unprecedented new readers". The New York Times stated that the home furniture was becoming simpler and that "the demand for extravagant and florid goods for household use" was gone.

In the nineteenth century, as machine-production became more mainstream, many household artists thought that the designs produced lacked artistic characteristics and had untraditional craftsmanship. Unlike manmade furniture, artists believed that machine-made furniture did not have holistic designs and "had a basic form, a skeleton so to speak, to which various moldings and appendages of different styles were hastily applied." Eastlake, like many others, disliked the machine-produced furniture that replicated handcraftsmanship. He stated that the "elaboration and finish" should be a lower priority and most artists concurred that the "educated ideas of construction and proportion" were preferred.

One person who popularized Eastlake's ideas was Henry Hudson Holly, an architect who wrote multiple articles using Eastlake's book but only cited him once. Although Holly profited from Eastlake's ideas, he echoed his ideas on furniture.

Eastlake's book led to a demand in Eastlake furniture; however, Eastlake himself denied that there was an Eastlake style. This led to furniture manufacturers—who initially thought that Eastlake's ideas would be more harmful than good—to invent their own Eastlake furniture, with it reaching a point that it was "seen everywhere". In 1876, the Centennial Exhibition showcased Eastlake's ideas from his book to thousands of Americans. While the ‘old’ Renaissance style was featured in most of the exhibitions, manufacturers were criticized for prioritizing profits over creating well-designed pieces of furniture. Following George W. Gay's comment on Eastlake having "far reaching influence" which could be compared to the best of America's and Europe's manufacturers, manufacturers of cheap furniture began to use Eastlake style whereas before little attention was paid to the appearance.

== Well-known Eastlake style houses ==
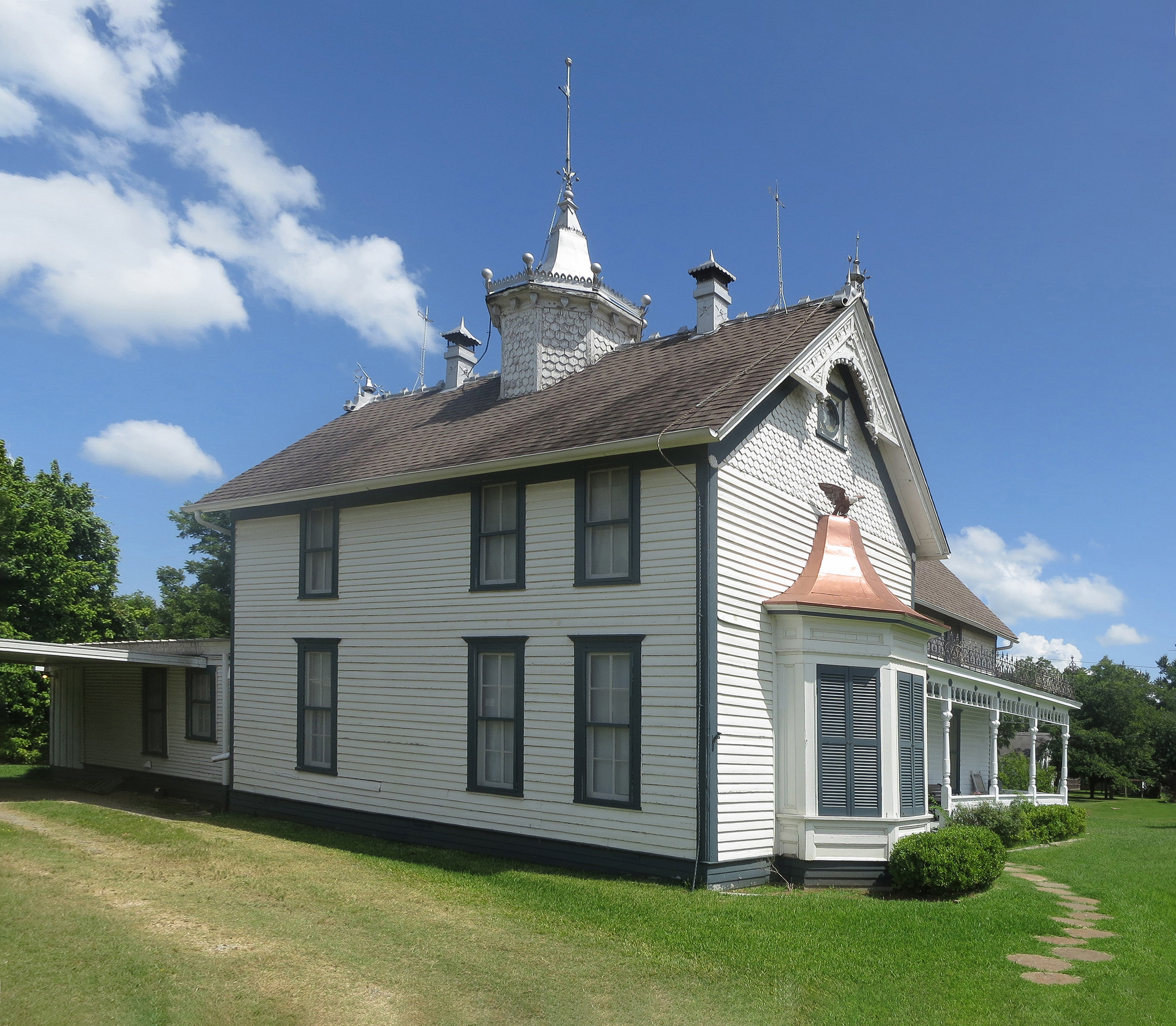
The home of Fridolin Fischer in Fairfield, Texas

Two well-known Eastlake style houses in the Los Angeles area, in Echo Park and Angelino Heights, are both on Carroll Avenue. The first is at 1330 Carroll Avenue. It was used in Michael Jackson's Thriller music video, as well as in episodes of the television show Charmed, and was a focus set in the episode "Size Matters".

The second house is at 1329 Carroll Avenue. The exterior of this house has been shown, in one way or another, in all 178 episodes of Charmed, through eight seasons, from 1999 to 2006. In the show the house was dubbed "Halliwell Manor". The house depicted in the show shares the same house number, 1329, but is on the fictional Prescott Street in San Francisco.

Chateau-sur-Mer, on Bellevue Avenue in Newport, Rhode Island, was altered and expanded during the Gilded Age to incorporate an Eastlake style billiard room and bedrooms.

Glenview Mansion in Yonkers, New York, also known as the John Bond Trevor Home, was completed in 1877. Glenview is now part of the Hudson River Museum and has six interpreted period rooms in the Eastlake style.

== See also ==
- Victorian decorative arts
- Stick-Eastlake
