= Charles W. Clinton =

American architect (1838–1910)

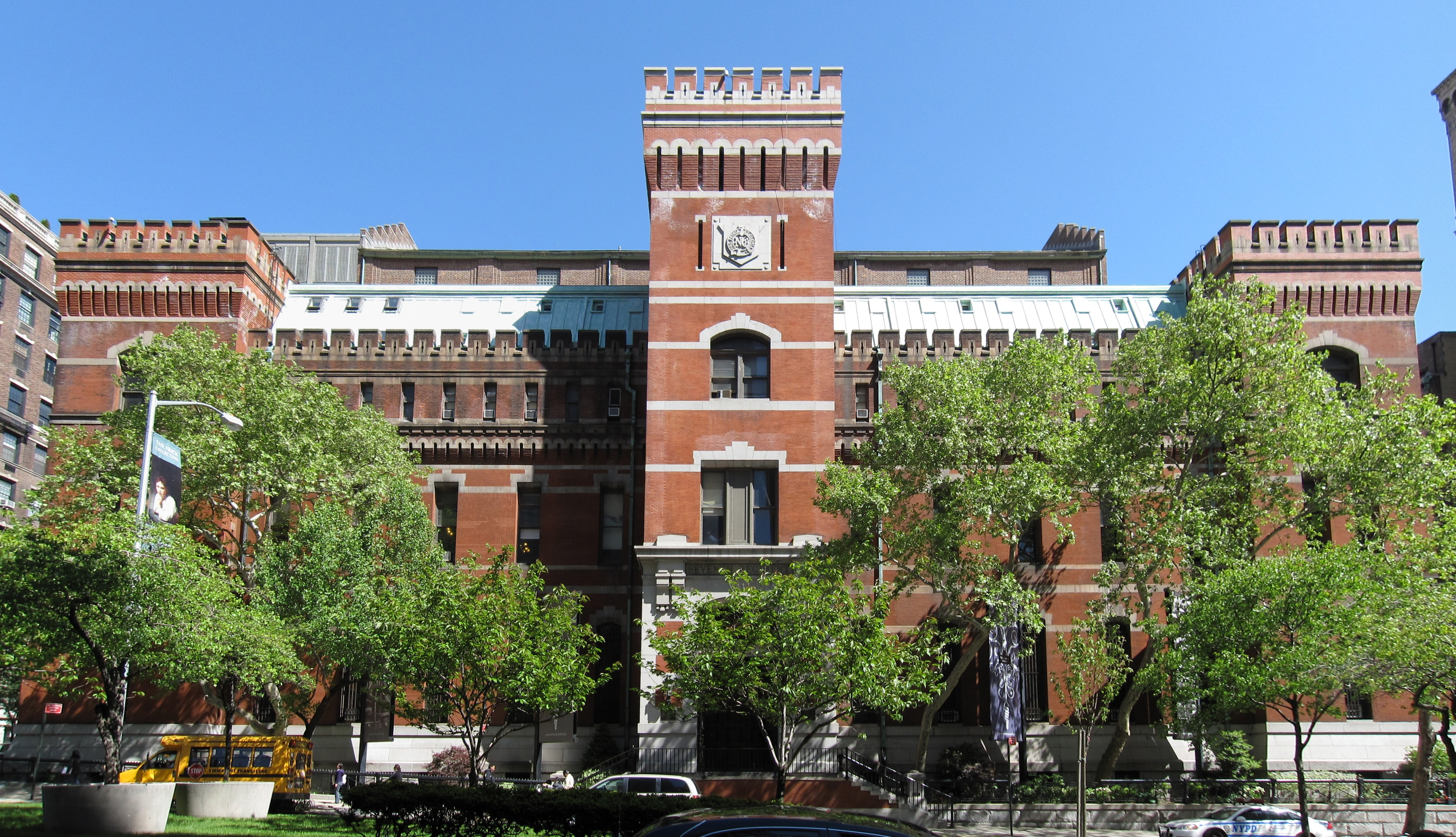
Seventh Regiment Armory, 1880

Charles William Clinton (1838–1910) was an American architect. From 1894 until his death, Clinton was a partner of the prominent firm of Clinton and Russell, but from 1858 through 1894 he conducted his own significant career.

Clinton was born and raised in New York, and received his formal architectural training in the office of Richard Upjohn. He left Upjohn in 1858 to begin a private practice, although he was associated with Edward Tuckerman Potter, and in the 1870s Clinton is twice credited alongside James W. Pirsson as collaborators.

Clinton's most prominent solo commission is the privately funded and unusually ornate 1880 Seventh Regiment Armory on Park Avenue in New York City; the architect himself was a member of the Seventh Regiment's Company K.

Clinton died at his home in New York City on December 1, 1910.

== Commissions ==
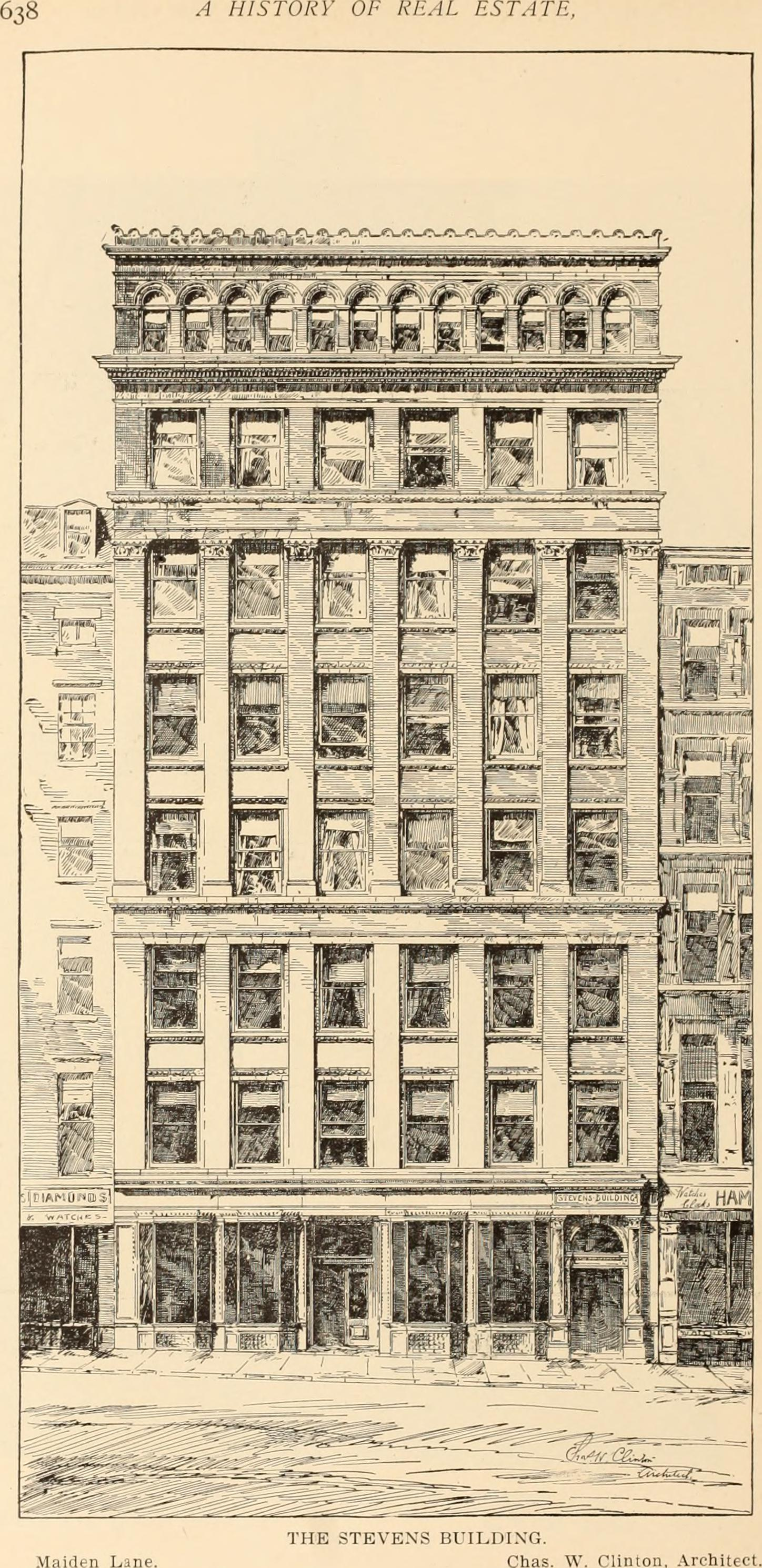
Stevens Building

- John Bond Trevor House, Yonkers, New York, 1876
- Queens Insurance Company Building, 37-39 Wall Street, credited to Clinton & Pirsson, 1877
- the Manhattan Apartments, Second Avenue and 86th Street, funded by the Rhinelander family, 1879–80
- Heber R. Bishop House, 881 5th Ave
- Seventh Regiment Armory, Park Avenue between East 66th and East 68th Street, with interior work by Louis Comfort Tiffany, Stanford White, Alexander Roux, Francis Davis Millet, and the Herter Brothers, 1880
- city quarters for The New York Athletic Club, Sixth Avenue and West 55th Street, 1886
- a cluster of four early skyscrapers on Wall Street, including the Bank of America Building at 44-46 Wall Street (1888–89), the Merchants' National Bank at 31-33 Wall Street, the nine-story Central Trust Company of New York Building at 54 Wall Street (1886–87), and the ten-story Wilks Building at 15 Wall Street (1889–90)
