= Hudson River Museum =

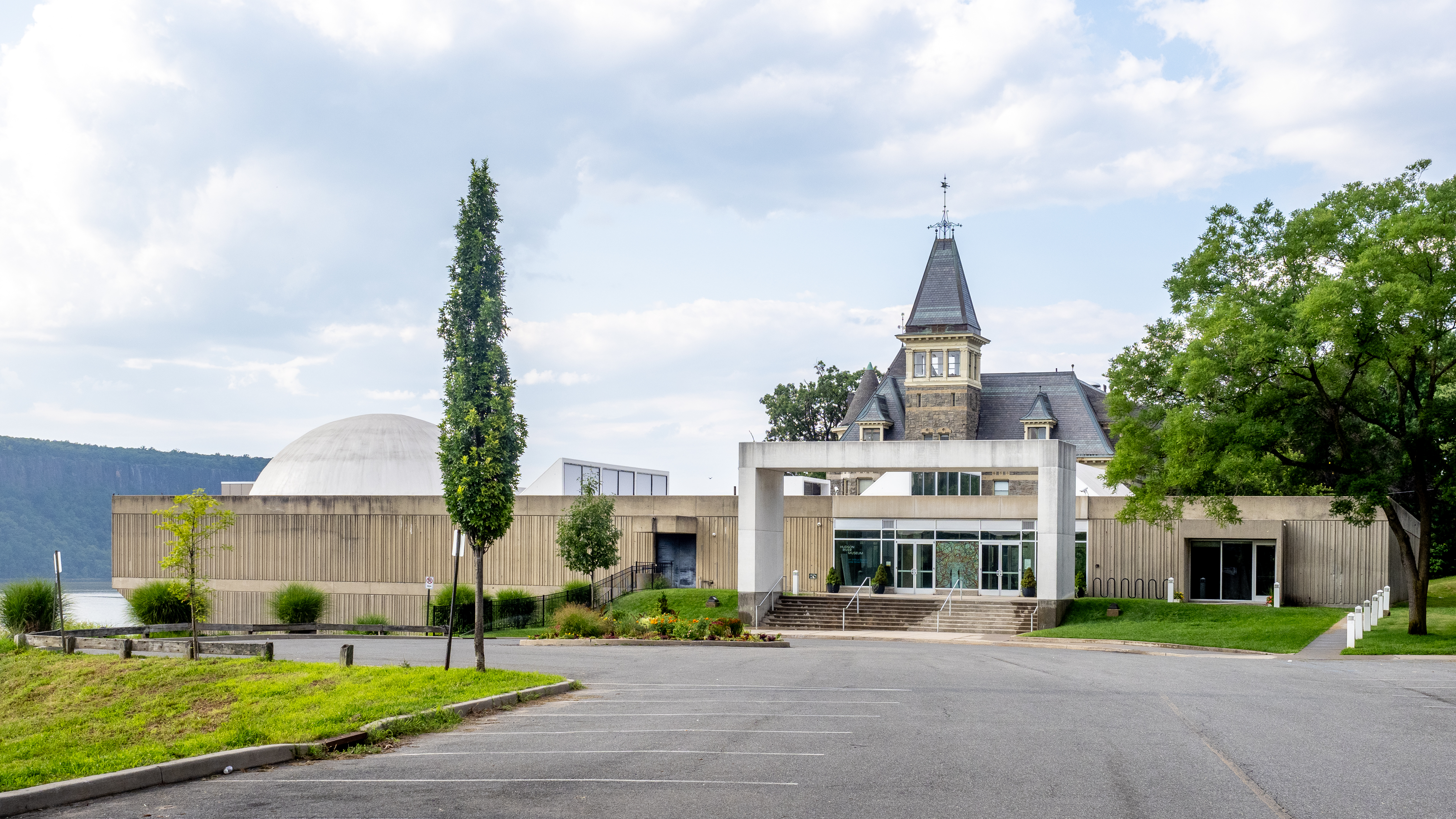
- Established: 1919
- Location: 511 Warburton Avenue; Yonkers, New York
- Coordinates: 40.9540°N 73.8963°W
- Type: Art museum, Planetarium
- Director: Masha Turchinsky
- Curators: Laura Vookles, Chair, Curatorial
- Public transit access: Metro North Glenwood station
- Website: www.hrm.org

The Hudson River Museum, located in Trevor Park in Yonkers, New York, is the largest museum in Westchester County, and features the only public planetarium in the county. While often considered an art museum due to its extensive collection of Hudson River School paintings, the museum also presents exhibits on the history, science and heritage of the region. The Museum is accredited by the American Alliance of Museums, since 1974.

== History ==
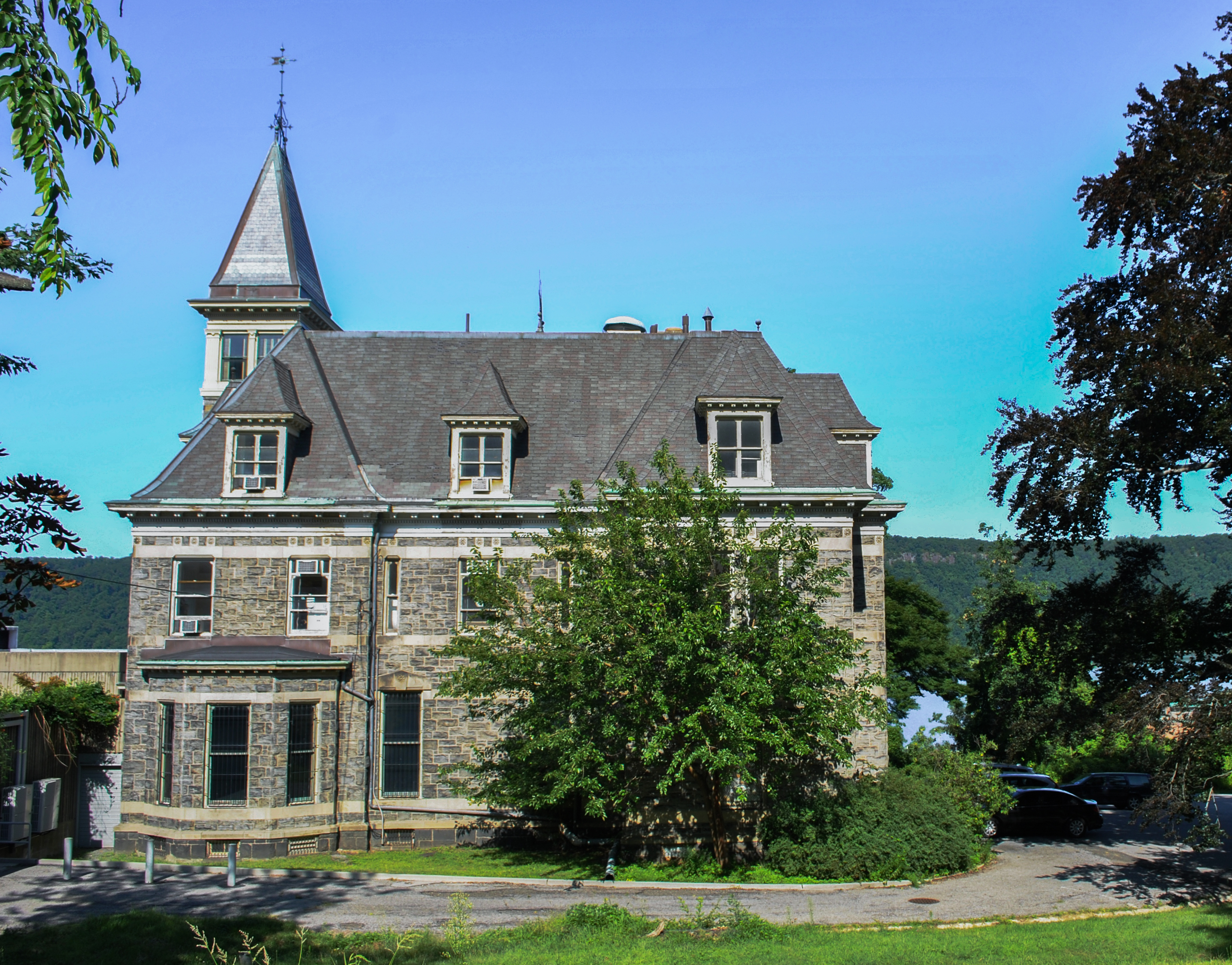
Glenview Mansion

Founded in 1919 by Edwin C. Mott as the Yonkers Museum in a room at Yonkers City Hall, the collection initially featured minerals but grew to include zoological specimens, paintings, statuary and other eclectic objects. Photographer Rudolf Eickemeyer Jr., a lifelong resident of Yonkers, also played a key role in the creation of the museum, as did sculptor Isidore Konti, and George J. Stengel.

Renamed the Yonkers Museum of Science and the Arts, it was relocated in 1924 to Glenview, the former Gilded Age mansion of Wall Street financier John Bond Trevor. The home was built in 1877 from a design by American architect Charles W. Clinton. The rooms feature carved woodwork by Philadelphia cabinetmaker Daniel Pabst. Around 1940 the museum was renamed the Hudson River Museum of Yonkers (eventually shortened to the Hudson River Museum).

In 1969 a larger and more modern facility was built adjoining the mansion for $1.8 million. This included galleries, a planetarium and a branch of the Yonkers Public Library. A few years later, six ground floor rooms of the Glenview house were restored with 19th-century furniture and decor. (The original furnishings were either sold off or removed when the city of Yonkers acquired the building.) In 1972 Glenview was listed on the National Register of Historic Places.

In June 2023, the museum opened a new 12,000 sq ft (1,100 m^{2}) west wing overlooking the Hudson River. It includes new exhibition spaces, a 100-seat auditorium, a Community and Partnership Gallery, and art storage space.

=== Planetarium ===
The museum has had a planetarium component for 70 years. The first planetarium was constructed in 1956 inside the Glenview mansion dining room. It had a 20-foot (6.1 m) dome, seating for 50 and a Spitz A-1 star projector capable of displaying 1,500 stars. In 1969, as part of the expansion of the museum campus, a planetarium was built with a 40-foot (12 m) dome, seating for 120 and a computer-driven Spitz Space Transit Projector. In 1987 the Spitz was replaced by a Zeiss M1015 star projector. One of only three in the U.S., it displayed 5,000 stars, a thousand more than the Spitz.

In 2014 the planetarium was renovated and upgraded with a Sky-Skan Digital Planetarium system and a Megastar-IIA projector capable of displaying 22 million stars. The Hudson River Museum Planetarium (formerly known as the Andrus Planetarium) remains the only public planetarium in Westchester County, and one of the few in the region to feature live presenters in addition to pre-recorded shows. The planetarium accommodates school groups on weekdays, while three different shows are offered to the public on weekends. Special events and shows are occasionally presented in the evening. The museum has also hosted watch parties for several astronomical events, beginning in 1970 with a solar eclipse, followed by the close approach of Mars in 1971, Halley's Comet in 1986 and the solar eclipses of 2017 and 2024.

== Funding ==
The late 1980s was a difficult time for the Hudson River Museum when it faced a decrease in funding, uncertainties in future funding, and a high level of staff turnover. The museum was forced to reduce its operating hours and cut some programming, but was able to expand the planetarium. The facility experienced a resurgence in the 1990s, received a number of grants and awards, saw increased funding from Westchester County, and was able to expand in time for its 75th anniversary. The museum also saw its attendance almost double from 55,000 to 100,000 between 1990 and 1994. The late 1990s saw a downturn in funding and the museum was again forced to face significant cutbacks. In the wake of these cutbacks, the museum began to host private events and offer tours, particularly to groups of school children, as a means of increasing income.

In 2023, the museum was awarded a federal Museums for America grant from the Institute of Museum and Library Services to digitize approximately 8,000 objects, largely consisting of historical photographs representative of their local and regional communities, including photographs from the archives of the John Bond Trevor family, the Alexander Smith Carpet Factory, artist Alvin Hollingsworth, and photographer Rudolf Eickemeyer Jr.

== Exhibitions and programs ==
In 1979, artist Red Grooms created and installed "The Bookstore" at Hudson River Museum, where it is on permanent display.

The museum's diversity is part of what led to its citation as one of the most unusual cultural facilities by the New York State Council on the Arts in 1972. It has sought to maintain this diversity amidst changes in leadership and focus throughout its history. The diversity is apparent in the museum's 23-acre (9.3 ha) site, on which a 2006 expansion attempted to better join the Glenview Mansion with the modern 1969 additions.

The museum used its namesake, the Hudson River, as the core of its 75th anniversary celebration in 1994. It celebrated its centennial in 2019.

Since 1995 the museum has offered a Junior Docent Program; the program was recognized by the President's Committee on the Arts and Humanities with a Coming Up Taller Award in 2008.

== In popular culture ==
The period interiors of the museum's Glenview Mansion appear in the HBO series The Gilded Age, an American historical drama television series created by Julian Fellowes, which premiered in January 2022.

An exhibition room and staircase from the museum’s interior appear in the Apple TV+ series Severance, and the exterior of Glenview Mansion was enclosed to portray a replica of Kier Eagan’s home as constructed in the Lumon Perpetuity wing.
