= John B. Trevor (Pennsylvania politician) =

American politician

9th Treasurer of Pennsylvania
- In office 1820–1821

Personal details
- Born: January 3, 1788 Upton-upon-Severn, England
- Died: September 29, 1860 (aged 72) Philadelphia, Pennsylvania
- Spouse: Sarah Sweyer
- Children: 4
- Education: Jefferson College

John B. Trevor (January 3, 1788 – September 29, 1860) was Pennsylvania State Treasurer from 1820 to 1821. He also served as Prothonotary of Fayette County, Pennsylvania from 1822 to 1824 and was the first cashier of the Connellsville Navigation Company, serving from 1816 to 1819.

He graduated from Jefferson College (now Washington & Jefferson College) in 1805.

Political offices
Preceded by R. M. Crain	Treasurer of Pennsylvania; 1820–1821	Succeeded by William Clark
