= Thomas F. Ricks House =

Historic house in California, United States

- U.S. National Register of Historic Places
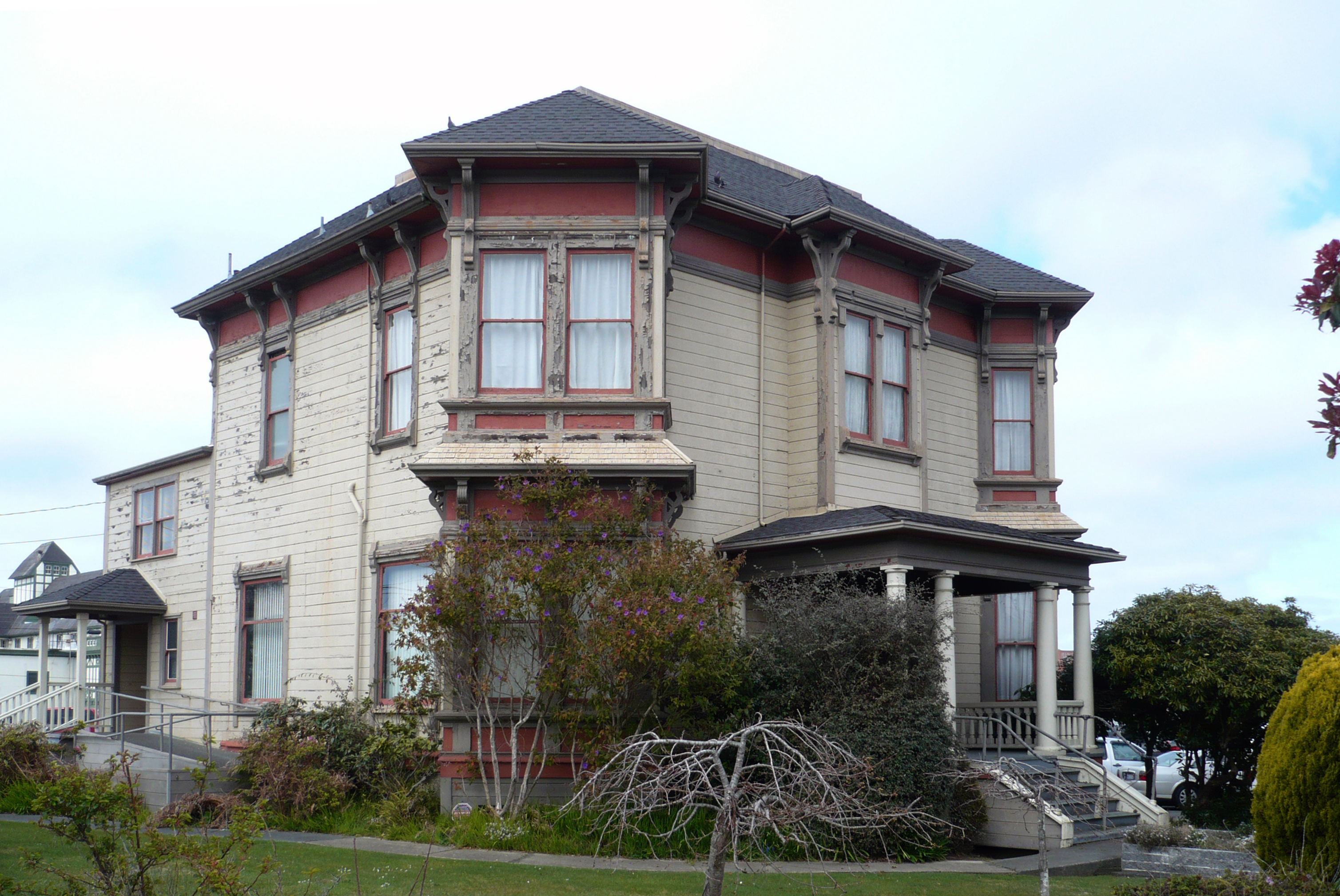
- The Thomas F. Ricks House

- Location within California Location within the United States
- Location: 730 H St., Eureka, California
- Coordinates: 40°48′0″N 124°9′45″W
- Area: less than one acre
- Built: 1885
- Architect: Butterfield, Walter; Butterfield, Fred B.
- Architectural style: Stick style/Eastlake
- NRHP reference No.: 92001302
- Added to NRHP: October 2, 1992

The Thomas F. Ricks House, also known as the Y.W.C.A. House, The Palms and St. Francis Hospital at 730 H. Street, Eureka, California was designed and built by Fred and Walter Butterfield in 1885 for owners Thomas Fouts Ricks and his wife, Eva. It was listed on the National Register of Historic Places in October 1992.

== Description ==
The building is a two-story detached Eastlake ornamented dwelling with three bays and a 1.5-story rear addition located on a quarter city block. The house is architecturally significant as most detailed example of Eastlake style in Eureka.

== History ==
Thomas F. Ricks (1855–1908) was born in Eureka, California, the son of 49-er Caspar S. Ricks (November 10, 1821 Rome, Indiana - June 21, 1888 San Francisco) who built many business and residential blocks in Eureka and Adaline A. Fouts of Clark County, Indiana who also owned Eureka property independent from that of her husband. The children of C.S. Ricks were well-to-do, socially prominent and influential. Thomas Ricks owned the Ricks Livery Stable. Thomas' younger brother, Hiram Lambert Ricks (1860 - January 27, 1921) established the present day Eureka water system, then named the "Ricks Water Company", served as Mayor of Eureka, and began campaigning for the Northwestern Pacific Railroad to Captain A.H. Payson, then president of the line. Both Mr. and Mrs. Thomas Ricks had extensive property holdings in Eureka, and Mrs. Rick's business extended as far as San Francisco, to which she traveled frequently. Thomas Ricks died in 1908, aged 53.

The building served as a private home from 1885 until Mrs. Ricks leased it to the privately owned St. Francis Hospital from 1907 to 1910. While the exterior was unchanged, the interior was modified to support hospital operations. Subsequently, from 1910 to 1925, it became Sequoia Hospital. In 1925 the building was sold to Charles J.A. Nelson who turned it into a boarding house named "The Palms." In 1935, the building became the Y.W.C.A. local chapter headquarters. The Y.W.C.A. owned the house until the late 1980s when College of the Redwoods purchased it.
