= Alexander Smith Carpet Mills Historic District =

Historic district in New York, United States

- U.S. National Register of Historic Places
- U.S. Historic district
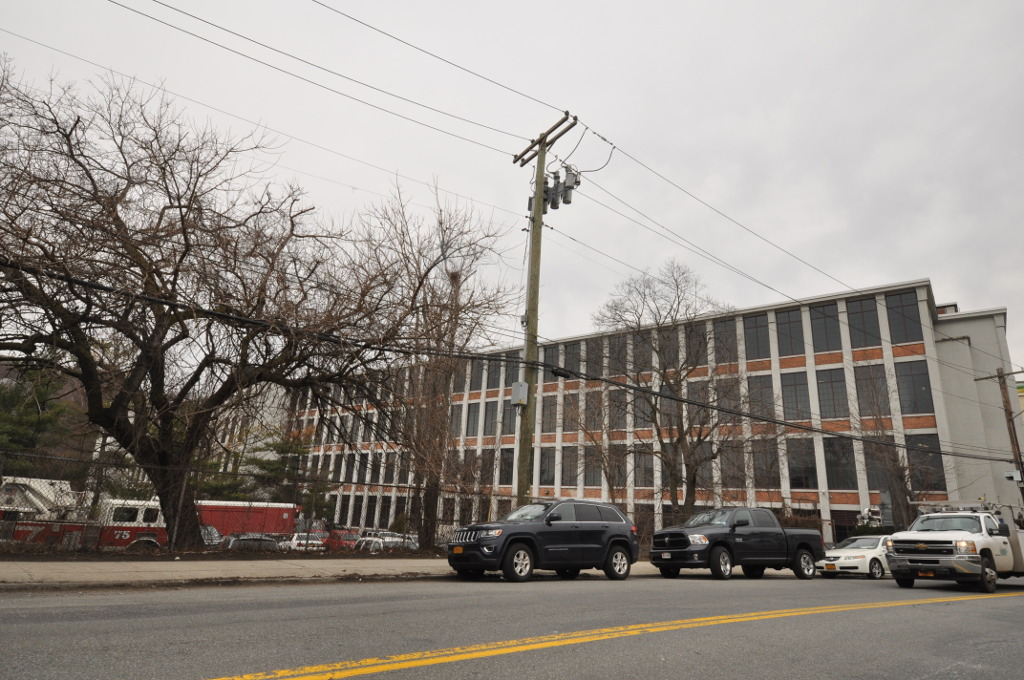
- View from Walnut Street

- Location within New York Location within the United States
- Location: Roughly bounded by Saw Mill River Rd., Orchard St., Lake and Ashburton Aves., Yonkers, New York
- Coordinates: 40°56′33″N 73°53′1″W
- Area: 38 acres (15 ha)
- Built: 1871
- Architectural style: International Style
- NRHP reference No.: 83001832
- Added to NRHP: August 11, 1983

The Alexander Smith Carpet Mills Historic District is a national historic district located at Yonkers, Westchester County, New York. It includes 85 contributing buildings. It encompasses 19 stylistically varied mill buildings and six rows of workers' housing. They were developed between 1871 and 1930 in the vicinity of northeastern Getty Square along the banks of the Saw Mill River. The main mill building was originally built in 1871 and expanded between 1876 and 1883. It is a three-story, rectangular building, 52 bays wide and five bays deep in the Second Empire style. It features a four-story tower and a five-story tower. The workers' housing, known as Moquette Row, North and South, was built between 1881 and 1886. Many workers that lived in this housing originally were immigrants to the United States. They came from Scotland, Ireland, and Ukraine. The carpet works were developed by Alexander Smith (1818-1878) The company closed the Yonkers mills and relocated to Greenville, Mississippi, in 1954. At the time of its closing, there were 2,400 who worked at the carpet mill. At the time of World War II, there was 7,000 employees who worked at the mill.It was later absorbed into Mohawk Carpet, later Mohasco Corporation. The carpet weaving industry was revolutionized by looms invented in this plant by Alexander Smith and Halcyon Skinner. Skinner, an engineer, designed a loom known as the Axminster power loom (also known as the Moquette Loom), which revolutionized the production of carpets. A patent for this loom was created in 1877 and royalty rights were sold to European and American companies at the rate of twenty cents per yard of carpet produced.

It was added to the National Register of Historic Places in 1983. Today, members of the YoHo Artist Community work out of two of buildings, located at 540 and 578 Nepperhan Avenue.

== Carpet Mills Arts District ==
The Carpet Mills Arts District in Yonkers, New York was formalized in March 2016 when the City Council cast a unanimous vote in favor of its approval. City Mayor Mike Spano subsequently signed the legislation on April 5, 2016. The arts district occupies the former carpet mills factory buildings located in the Alexander Smith Carpet Mills Historic District. Its boundaries lie from Lake Avenue to the north and Ashburton Avenue to the south, and to Nepperhan Avenue to the west, extending to Saw Mill River Road to the east, encompassing the following buildings:

- 430 Nepperhan Avenue,
- 440 Nepperhan Avenue,
- 450 Nepperhan Avenue,
- 470 Nepperhan Avenue,
- 498E Nepperhan Avenue,
- 500–530 Nepperhan Avenue,
- 540–578 Nepperhan Avenue,
- 252 Lake Avenue,
- 222 Lake Avenue
- 145 Saw Mill River Road,
- 167 Saw Mill River Road, and
- 179 Saw Mill River Road.

== District beginnings ==
Early creative industry and artist activity in the area dates back decades ago, with a few tenants working out of the factory buildings as early as the 1980s. When private developers acquired two buildings at 540 and 578 Nepperhan Avenue in 2005, there were 25 artists working out of the Mills. This group grew to become to the YOHO Artist Community.

Developers managed and carefully grew the community through the use of events and promotion of the community until it grew from 25 to 85 artists over eight years, and the artist trend spread to other sections of the Mills owned by other developers. The developers collaborated through events and lobbying Yonkers City Officials to form the Carpet Mills Artists District - a change that was approved by the City of Yonkers under Mayor Mike Spano on April 5, 2016.

In April 2015, Mayor Mike Spano announced the proposal of Carpet Mills Arts District (CMAD). He hosted a ribbon-cutting for the recently named district as a kick-off for Yonkers Arts Weekend the following month, the success of which was attributed to the collaboration of city officials, building owners Huang and Rose, and the growing numbers of local artists in the area. Similar events had been happening at YOHO for many years, with the artist community inviting the public to their popular Annual Open Studios event.

The Open Studios paved the way for a more widespread event that would branch out to other locations in Yonkers. The mayor noted with the proposed zoning change that coincided with the creation of CMAD, the district would see future growth as restaurants, boutiques, galleries, retail shops, and a higher number of artists would be encouraged to move into the area.

== Approval of Arts District ==
On April 5, 2016, Mayor Mike Spano approved the zoning change that would allow the area to operate as a formal arts district, and officiated a legislative signing ceremony on May 12, with Councilman Sabatino, George Huang, and Randolph Rose participating.

The district has been awarded a $500,000 capital grant to be used for further development, including building improvements, landscaping, signage, and lighting. With the formation of this arts district, Yonkers, New York and the supporters of this project see a future as a public arts destination. According to Yonkers Deputy Planning Commissioner Louis Albano, "It was decided to take advantage of some of the artisans in the area and create this district to allow them two things - to show their wares and to open galleries that would be ancillary and complementary to the crafts that they produce in their shops, but also to create restaurant space to create more visitors and foot traffic into the area." He further describes the arts district as "our little baby Soho going on in the Nepperhan Valley."

== See also ==
- Pelton Mill: Historic carpet mill in Poughkeepsie, New York
- National Register of Historic Places listings in Yonkers, New York
