= Park Avenue Armory =

Armory in Manhattan, New York

- 7th Regiment Armory
- U.S. National Register of Historic Places
- U.S. National Historic Landmark
- U.S. Historic district – Contributing property
- New York State Register of Historic Places
- New York City Landmark
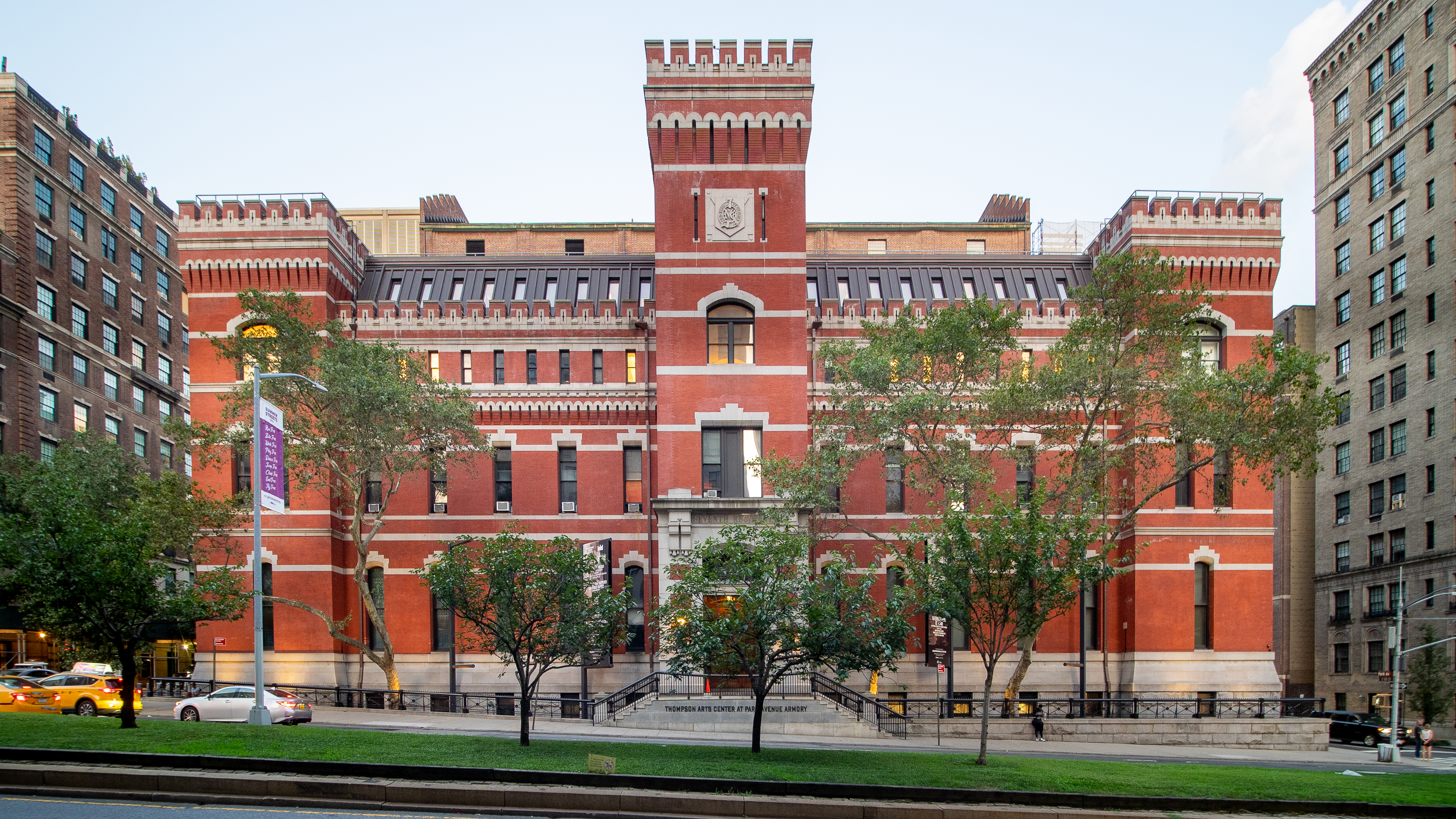
- The armory's Park Avenue facade in 2019

- Location within Manhattan Location within New York City Location within New York Location within the United States
- Interactive map of 7th Regiment Armory
- Location: 643 Park Avenue; Manhattan, New York, US
- Coordinates: 40°46′03″N 73°57′58″W
- Built: 1877–1880
- Architect: Charles W. Clinton
- Architectural style: Gothic Revival
- Part of: Upper East Side Historic District (ID84002803)
- NRHP reference No.: 75001208
- NYSRHP No.: 06101.000066
- NYCL No.: 0417, 1884

Significant dates
- Added to NRHP: April 14, 1975
- Designated NHL: February 24, 1986
- Designated CP: September 7, 1984
- Designated NYSRHP: June 23, 1980
- Designated NYCL: June 9, 1967 (exterior); July 19, 1994 (interior)

The Park Avenue Armory, also known as the 7th Regiment Armory, is a historic armory for the U.S. Army National Guard at 643 Park Avenue on the Upper East Side of Manhattan in New York City, New York, United States. Designed in the Gothic Revival style by Charles Clinton for the 7th New York Militia Regiment, the Park Avenue Armory was completed in 1880, with two expansions in the early 20th century. The building and its interior are New York City designated landmarks, and the structure is also a National Register of Historic Places site and a National Historic Landmark. Since 2006, it has been the home of the Park Avenue Armory Conservancy, which leased the building for 99 years from the New York state government. The 53rd Digital Liaison Detachment of the New York Army National Guard, the Veterans of the 7th Regiment, the Knickerbocker Greys cadet corps, and the Lenox Hill Neighborhood House also occupy parts of the armory.

The armory occupies a city block bounded by Park Avenue to the west, 67th Street to the north, Lexington Avenue to the east, and 66th Street to the south. It is composed of two structures: the five-story administration building to the west and a drill hall to the east. The facade of the administration building is made of Philadelphia red brick and granite trim, with various defensive features. Numerous spaces in the interior of the building were designed in several styles by decorators such as Louis Comfort Tiffany, Stanford White, Kimbel and Cabus, Alexander Roux, Francis Davis Millet, and the Herter Brothers. These include halls and stairways; a series of regimental rooms on the first floor; and twelve rooms for the 7th Regiment's companies on the second floor. The drill hall, measuring 200 by 300 feet (61 by 91 m), was one of New York City's largest column-free indoor spaces when completed.

The New York City Board of Aldermen approved the Park Avenue Armory's construction in 1875 but refused to fund the $350,000 construction cost. As such, the 7th Regiment funded the armory's construction through donations and a bond issue; work started in 1877, and the armory formally opened on September 30, 1880. The armory was substantially expanded from 1909 to 1913, with a refurbished drill hall and a new fourth story; the fifth floor was built in the late 1920s or early 1930s. The building was mostly used for military purposes through the 20th century, though it had hosted numerous events, competitions, and exhibits over the years. The state government proposed leasing out the armory in the late 1990s. In 2000, the state awarded the Park Avenue Armory Conservancy the responsibility of overhauling the building, restoring the dilapidated interior spaces, and transforming it into an arts venue. In the 21st century, the armory is largely used as an event, exhibit, and performance space.

== Site ==
The Park Avenue Armory is on the Upper East Side of Manhattan in New York City, New York, United States. It occupies the entire city block bounded by Park Avenue to the west, 67th Street to the north, Lexington Avenue to the east, and 66th Street to the south. The land lot is rectangular and covers 81,336 ft^{2} (7,556 m^{2}), with a frontage of about 200 ft (61 m) on either avenue and about 405 ft (123 m) on either street. Neighboring buildings include 620 Park Avenue to the southwest; 655 Park Avenue, Millan House, and the Hunter College campus to the north; 149–151 East 67th Street and the Park East Synagogue to the northeast; 130 East 67th Street and 131 East 66th Street to the east; and the Church of Saint Vincent Ferrer to the southeast.

The site was owned by the British Crown until the American Revolutionary War, when the New York City government took over the site. When streets were laid out per the Commissioners' Plan of 1811, the city government retained six city blocks between 66th Street, Park Avenue, 69th Street, and Third Avenue. The six-block site was intended to be developed into a public park called Hamilton Square, but the plots were instead leased to educational, medical, and charitable institutions. The Park Avenue Armory was one such institution, built on the southwest corner of Hamilton Square on land leased from the city. Just prior to the armory's construction, Emmons Clark, the leader of the 7th New York Militia Regiment, described the site as having been occupied by "35 shanties". The armory, along with Hunter College and a fire and police station on 67th Street, are the only remnants of the site's use as an institutional campus.

== Architecture ==
The building was designed by the architect Charles W. Clinton in the Gothic Revival style. The builder was R. L. Darragh, while the bricklayers were Van Dolson & Arnott. The Park Avenue Armory is composed of two structures: the administration building to the west, on Park Avenue, and the drill hall to the east, on Lexington Avenue. The entire building is surrounded by a landscaped areaway, except on the Lexington Avenue frontage of the drill hall.

=== Form and facade ===
==== Administration building ====
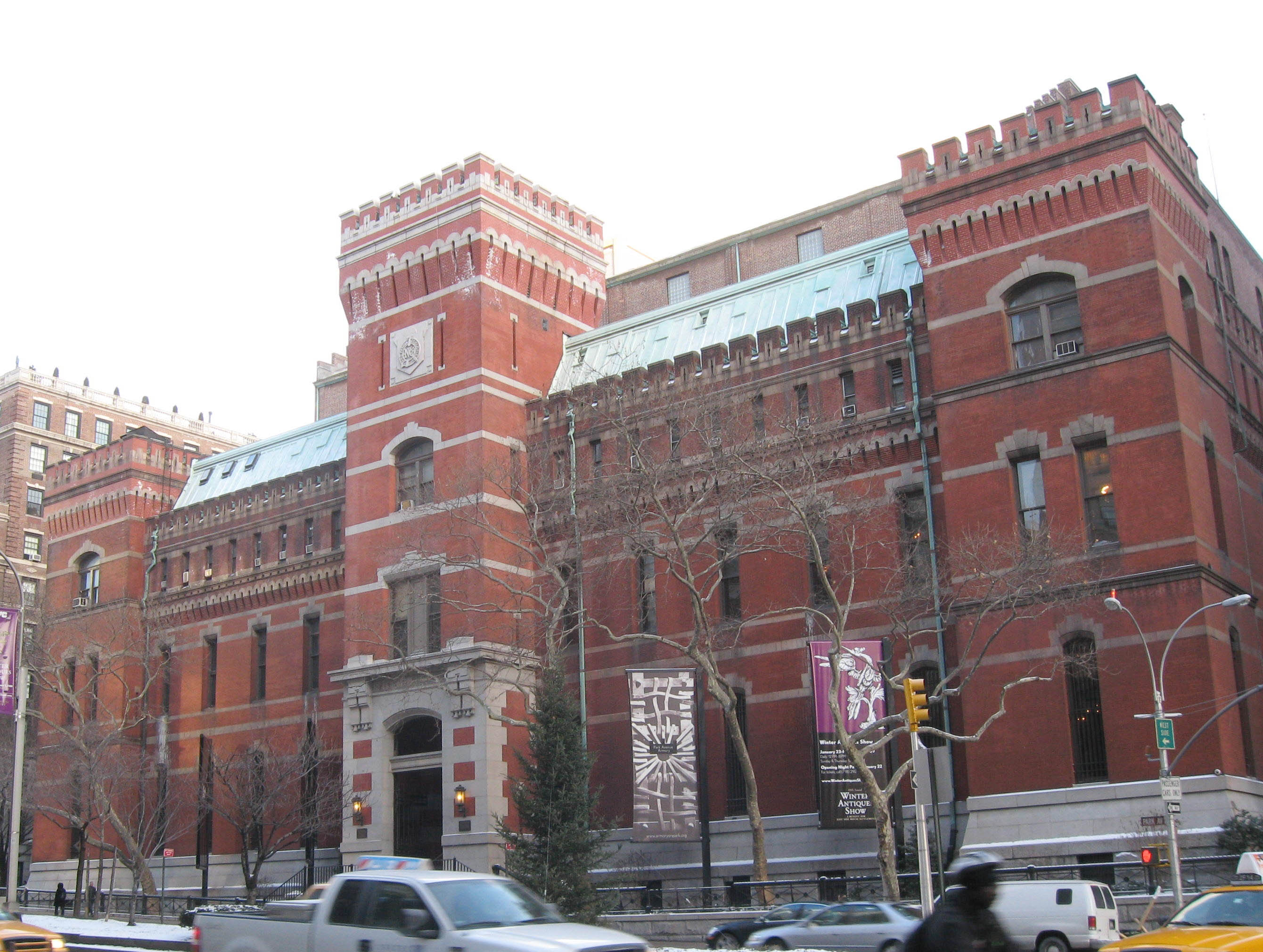
The armory's administration building as seen from its southwestern corner, at Park Avenue and 66th Street

The administration building was originally three stories tall, with the third story being a mansard roof. The fourth story was added in 1909, but the fifth story, recessed from Park Avenue, was built in 1930. The structure's main facade faces Park Avenue and is 200 feet (61 m) wide. It is divided into two sections by a set of three protruding towers with corbels and crenellation. Originally, the central tower was five stories high, while the outer towers were three and a half stories high. The central tower had a spired belfry with granite arches, which was removed in a 1909 renovation.

The facade of the administration building was built with Philadelphia red brick and granite trim. The basement is clad with thick walls of rock-faced granite. There is a smooth-granite sill course at the bottom of the first story. The main entrance is through a set of granite steps that leads to the first story (within the central tower). The entrance was designed to be wide enough to fit four soldiers walking side by side. Under the main entrance archway was originally a large bronze gate with a bronze tablet displaying the coat of arms of the 7th New York Militia Regiment. Behind the gate, a solid oak, iron-studded door opened onto the main hall. Along the rest of the facade, the three towers are connected by recessed walls. The windows are long and narrow, illuminating the offices and regimental rooms inside. The facade also had granite quoins and granite arches. The cornices at the tops of each tower are decorated with corbeled bricks; above these are crenellated parapets. Brick corbels extend horizontally across the third floor.

The administration building was designed as a utilitarian structure, lacking what Clark described as "useless ornament". The tall, narrow windows could be easily defended in an attack, and the windows had iron shutters. The facade also contains numerous loopholes, through which soldiers could fire their rifles while being shielded from enemy fire. The top of the central tower, rising 100 feet (30 m), allowed easy views of the surrounding neighborhood. The structure could be defended by fifty soldiers at a time.

==== Drill hall section ====
The large vaulted space for the drill hall is on the eastern three-quarters of the block. The drill hall is also clad with brick, with three band courses of stone running horizontally across the plain facade. The top of the wall has stone coping and a parapet that is crenellated. The arched doorway at the center of the Lexington Avenue facade was originally fitted with a heavy iron gate and thick oaken doors. Narrow windows, also meant to be easily defensible, lined the 66th and 67th Street facades.

=== Interior ===
The first floor of the administration building has various regimental rooms laid on a north–south axis. The regimental rooms were used by both the public and the 7th Regiment's officers and consisted of the adjutant's, board of officers', colonel's, field and staff, and non-commissioned officers' rooms. Also in the building were a library, veterans' quarters, memorials, reading rooms, reception rooms, and drill hall/gymnasium, as well as six squad drill rooms and ten company rooms (expanded to twelve in the 1910s). Most of these rooms, with the exception of the Veterans Room, are not well known to the public.

Architects and interior designers of the American Aesthetic Movement were commissioned to furnish the rooms and company quarters. These include the Veterans Room and Library, decorated by Louis Comfort Tiffany along with Stanford White; and the Reception, Board of Officers, and Colonel's rooms, designed by the Herter Brothers. The interior spaces were decorated with various paintings and portraits. The collection included a portrait of George Washington by Rembrandt Peale, and portraits depicting the 7th Regiment in camp and on the march by Thomas Nast and Sanford Robinson Gifford. There were also portraits of various 7th Regiment colonels and other officers. The armory displayed sculptures as well, such as a statue of Mercury, a plaster cast of the Seventh Regiment Memorial in Central Park, and a replica of the Statue of Liberty. As of 2024, the rooms host various performances, exhibitions, and events. Many of the rooms are protected as New York City designated landmarks, so the art, floors, and walls cannot be modified for exhibitions.

==== Hallways and stairs ====
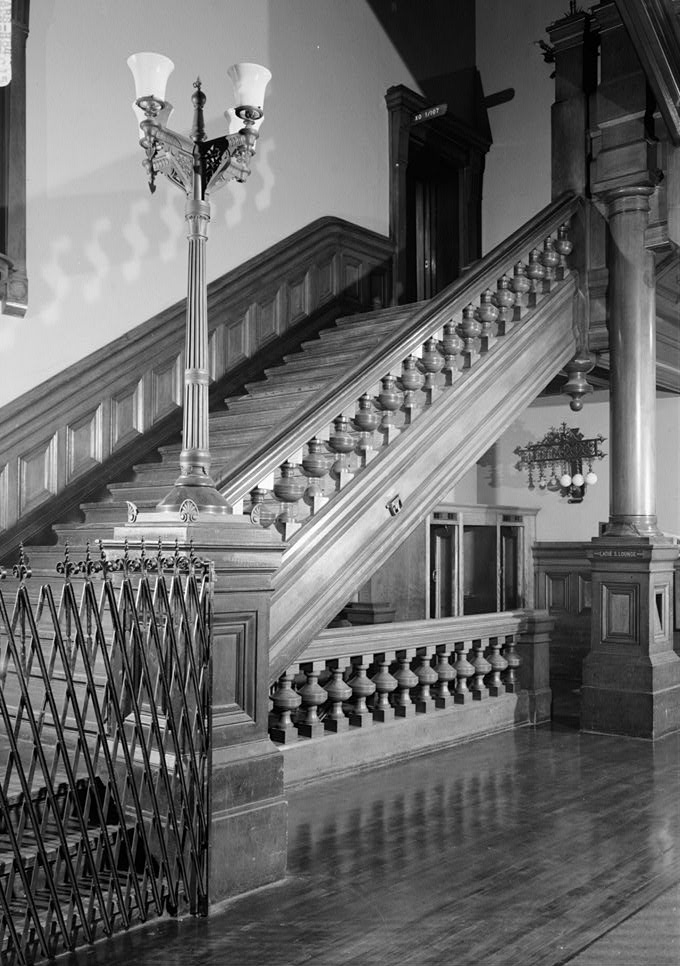
Main staircase in the Park Avenue Armory

On the first floor of the administration building, the regimental rooms are divided into northwest, southwest, and eastern sections by a west–east entrance hall and a north–south main corridor. The entrance hall, the hallways on the first and second floors, and the main stairway between the two floors were all designed by George C. Flint & Co. The spaces have decorative features such as plaster ceilings, oak woodwork, and ornate doorways.

The first-floor entrance hall leads west of the north–south corridor to the Park Avenue entrance. From the outset, the hall was decorated with various plaques describing the 7th Regiment's history. At the eastern end of the entrance hall (where it meets the corridor), a double stairway leads from the first to the second floors. The stair was built of iron to accommodate the weight of a large number of soldiers, but it is clad with oak. The north–south corridor on the first floor, and a similar one on the second floor, are illuminated by various wrought-iron wall sconces and chandeliers. The first-floor corridor has a pressed metal ceiling. This corridor also contains portraits of Medal of Honor winners, portraits of 7th Regiment officers, trophies of war, and a book of remembrance for members of the regiment who have died in combat over the years. The second-floor corridor has stairways at either end that were installed in 1911.

==== Regimental rooms ====
===== Veterans Room and library =====
Veterans (Tiffany) Room

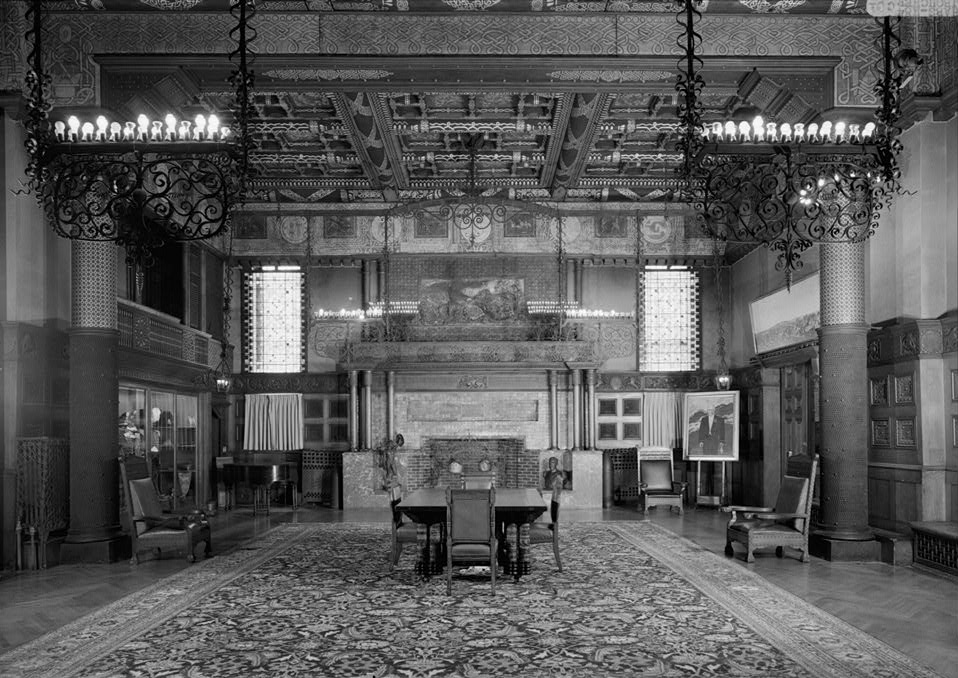
1984

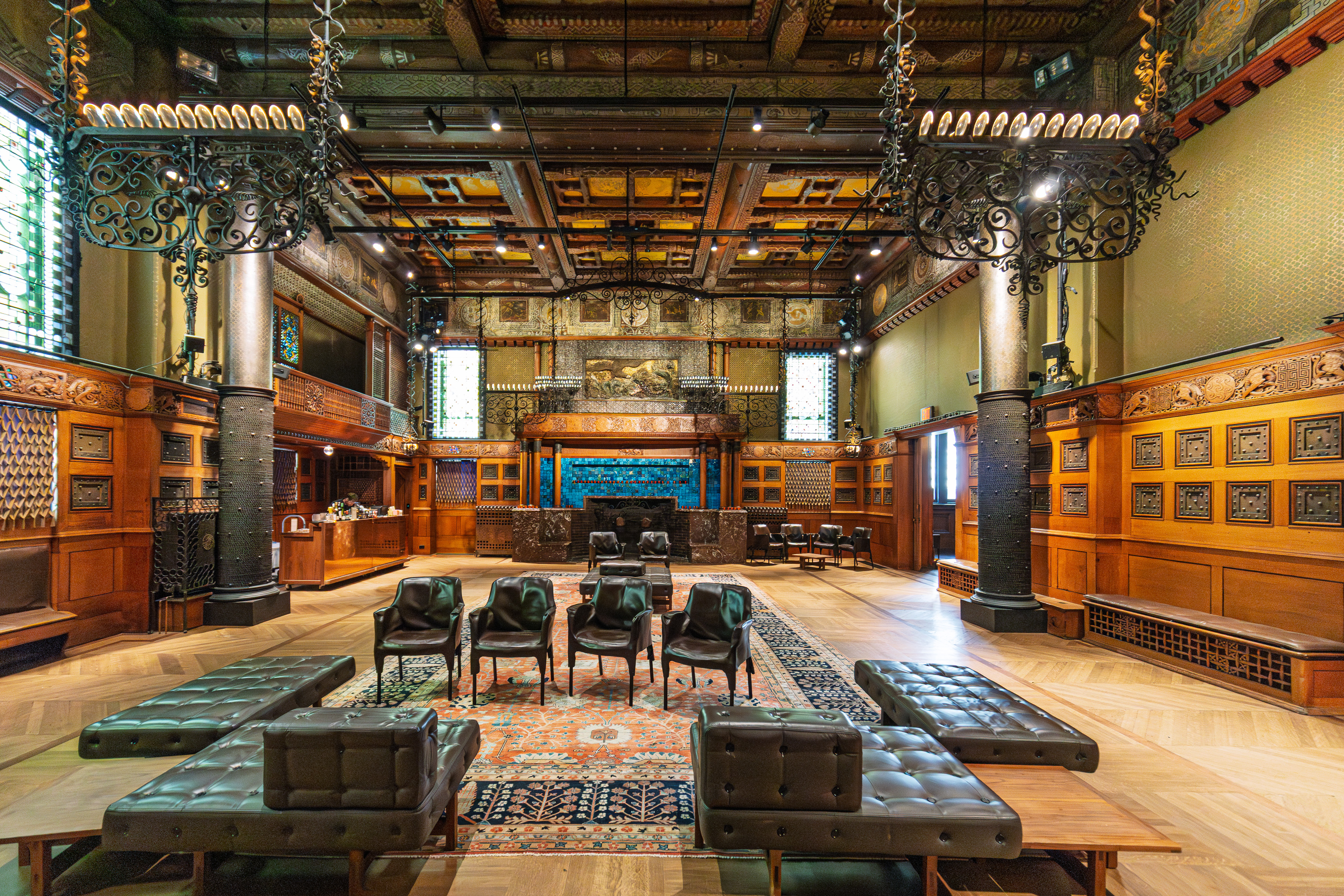
2025

The Veterans Room and library, designed by Tiffany and White and completed in 1881, are at the northwestern section of the ground floor. They are among the few remaining interior spaces influenced by the American Aesthetic Movement, as well as two of the only surviving rooms worldwide designed by Tiffany's Associated Artists. Tiffany created stained glass windows for the Veterans Room, while Francis D. Millet and George H. Yewell were responsible for friezes in that room. Other people involved in the design included Samuel Colman, who did the stenciling; Candace Wheeler, who created the embroideries; and possibly Lockwood de Forest, who may have provided some of the woodwork carving. Though no single style was used for the spaces, one source called the rooms "Greek, Moresque, and Celtic with a dash of the Egyptian, the Persian and the Japanese".

The Veterans Room is located at the northwest corner of the building, on 67th Street; according to architect Robert A. M. Stern, it was "perhaps the armory's most notable interior". On the north wall is a mosaic-tile fireplace; a wooden mantel measuring almost 10 feet (3.0 m) tall, which depicts an eagle attacking a sea dragon; and a plaster overmantel with stained-glass windows on either side. The room has oak wainscoting, benches, and sliding doors. The walls were originally painted blue-gray with stenciling, and wrought-iron lighting fixtures illuminate the space. At the top of the wall is a frieze with battle scenes and shields. There are two columns with nautical chains wrapped around their lower halves. The coffered ceiling has redwood beams. The room is overlooked by a balcony with oak balustrade. It has been modified several times; it was used as a reading and social room after 1889 and served as a performance venue by the early 21st century.

The library, also known as the Silver Room, is just south of the Veterans Room on the north wall of the lobby. The room contains mahogany woodwork such as sliding doors; there were also formerly two tiers of bookcases with glass doors. A stair leads to a gallery with iron rails. The walls are paneled and were formerly stenciled. Also within the library are an inglenook fireplace and a pair of multi-pane round-arched windows with some stained glass. The ceiling of the library is a barrel vault, originally salmon-colored with a basketweave pattern and silver disks. A chandelier hangs from the ceiling. The library's books were moved to the third floor in 1895–1896, and the space was adapted into a regimental museum c. 1911–1914.

===== Reception and Board of Officers rooms =====
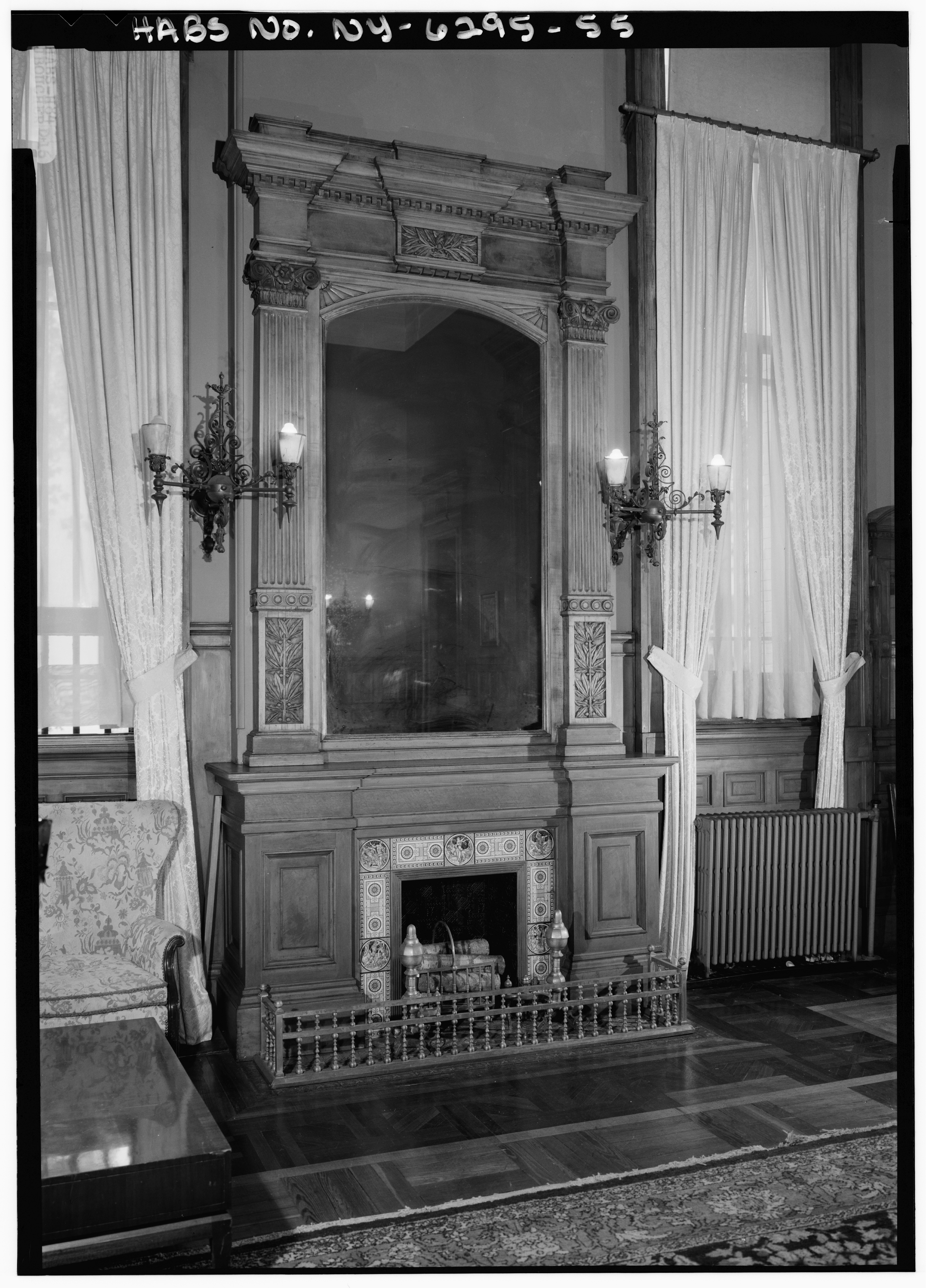
Fireplace in the reception room

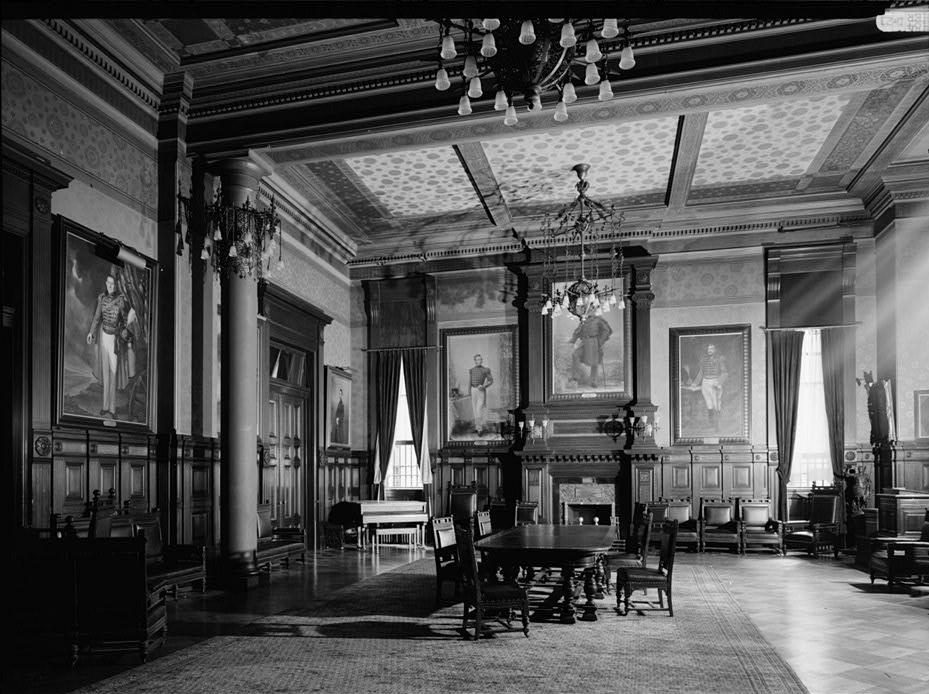
Board of Officers Room

The reception and Board of Officers rooms are at the southwestern section of the ground floor. The reception room, also known as the Mary Divver Room (after an orphan that the 7th Regiment adopted in the 1850s), is on the south wall of the lobby and north of the Board of Officers Room. Alexander Roux was responsible for woodwork, and the Herter Brothers designed other decorations. The reception room features maple woodwork with sliding doors on three walls; the fourth wall has paneled wainscoting, a fireplace with overmantel, and windows. The Herter Brothers created stenciled decorations, mostly in red and gold, which no longer exist. It has historically been used as a women's reception and coat room.

The Board of Officers Room, also known as the Clark Room, is at the southwest corner of the building, on 66th Street. It is one of a small number of extant interiors designed by the Herter Brothers, with mahogany woodwork from that company. The south wall has a 7-foot-high (2.1 m) fireplace surrounded by a mantel and an overmantel with painting, flanked by windows and additional paintings. The walls and ceilings were decorated with floral designs, later covered over: the wall was originally painted blue, and the ceiling had a frieze. Originally, there was also a desk for the presiding officer, as well as cabinets. From 1932 onward, the room was a memorial to Emmons Clark. The stencils on the ceiling and walls were restored in 2013; the wall was painted dark green, and the ceilings were painted yellow.

===== Other regimental rooms =====
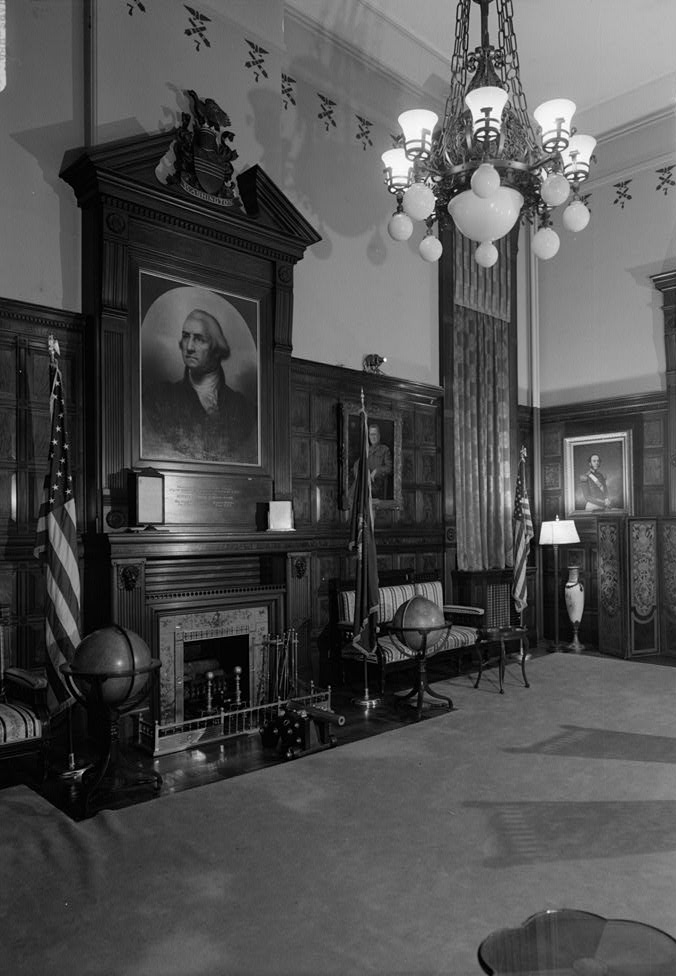
Colonel's Room

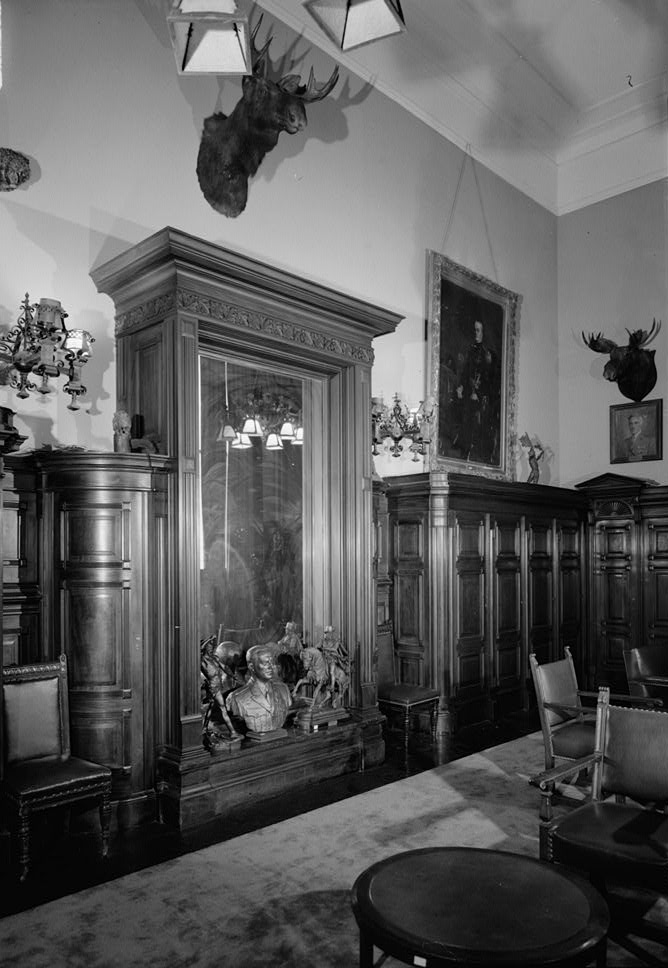
Field and Staff Room

Between the hallway to the west and the drill hall to the east are additional regimental rooms, including six protected as New York City landmarks. Two of the landmarked rooms, the Colonel's and Adjutant's rooms, are south of the stair hall. The Colonel's Room, the southernmost such room, was designed by the Herter Brothers and redecorated by Irving and Casson in 1948. Originally, the room was characterized as having a red stenciled wall, a frieze, and a decorated blue ceiling. The south wall has a mantel and overmantel, while the east wall originally had a window and cabinets. The modern-day Colonel's Room has black-walnut woodwork, including door and window surrounds; the walls and ceilings have been repainted over the years. Just north of the western part of the Colonel's Room is the Adjutant's Room, formerly the western part of the South Squad's drill room, which has an oak parquet floor, two lockers, and cabinets. Two other rooms are located north and east of the Adjutant's Room.

There are four rooms north of the stair hall, all protected as city landmarks. The Equipment Room, built as the quartermaster's room, was designed by Clinton and Russell in 1895. It is a pine-clad space with cabinets, hardwood floors, a window on the east wall, and plaster decorations on the walls and ceilings. North of the Equipment Room are two committee rooms, both designed by Robinson & Knust and created out of the former North Squad Drill Room in 1909–1911. The Outer Committee Room to the west and the Inner Committee Room to the east both have mahogany woodwork, wainscoting, wood doorways, plaster ceilings, and chandeliers. The Field and Staff Room, designed by Pottier & Stymus, is north of the committee rooms. It had large lockers; dark mahogany wainscoting and furnishings; stenciled walls, friezes, and ceilings; and taxidermied animal heads.

==== Wade Thompson Drill Hall ====
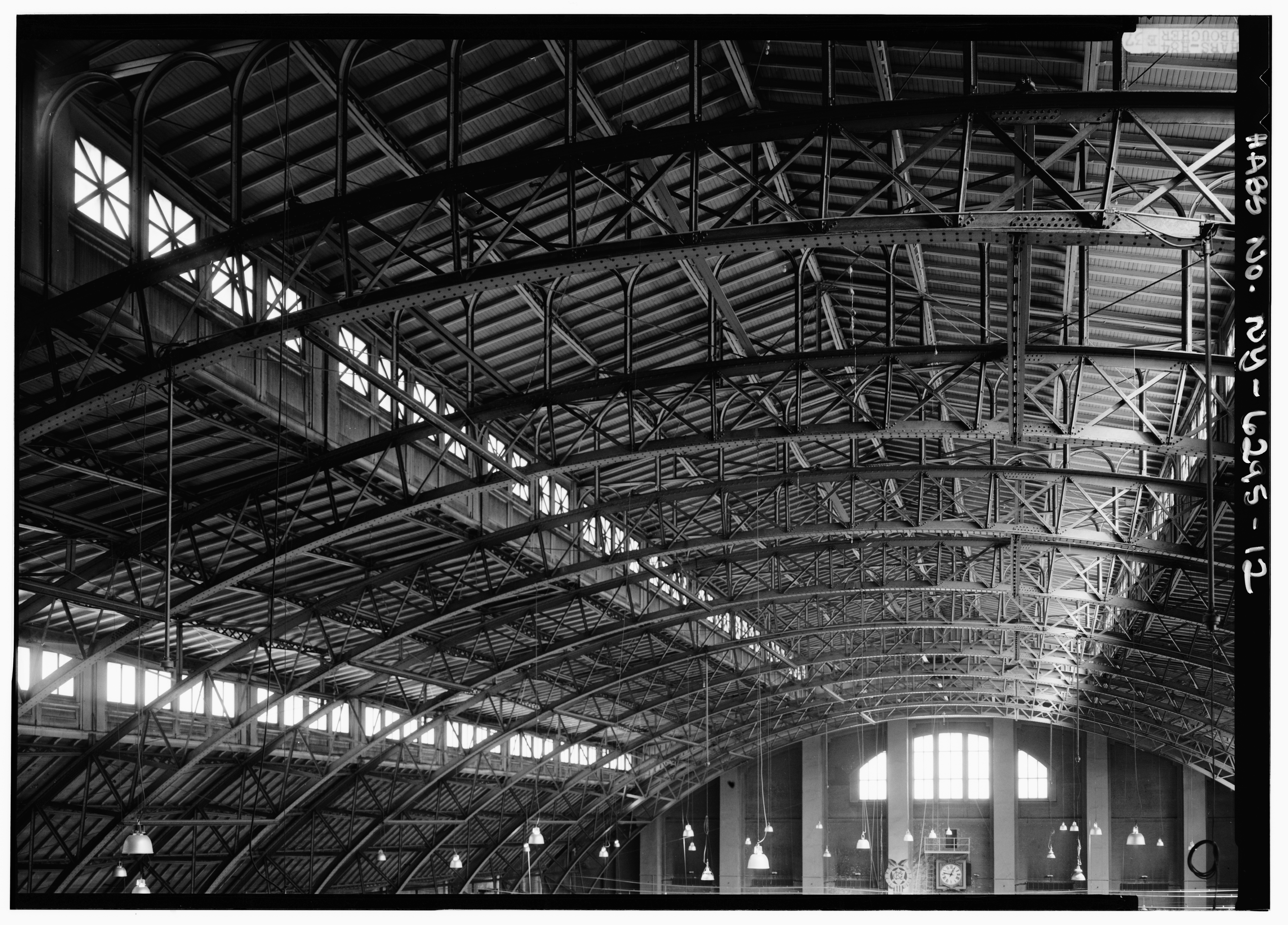
Detail of the drill hall, with clerestory windows on the sides of the roof

The drill hall, officially known as the Wade Thompson Drill Hall and also known as the drill room or drill shed, occupies the eastern portion of the site. It was designed by consulting architect Robert G. Hatfield, who had helped design Grand Central Depot, and engineer Charles MacDonald. Measuring 200 by 300 feet (61 by 91 m) across, (Note: Other sources have given different measurements of 187 by 270 feet (57 by 82 m), 187 by 290 feet (57 by 88 m), 187 by 298 feet (57 by 91 m),) the drill hall has a volume of about 3,720,000 cubic feet (105,000 m^{3}) and was about three times as large as the drill hall at the 7th Regiment's previous armory. The drill hall was one of the largest column-free indoor spaces in New York City when completed; The New York Times said the room was among the largest such spaces in the United States. The hall was designed similarly to a train shed and is the oldest balloon shed in the U.S., as well as one of the first American balloon sheds not associated with a railroad station.

The drill hall has Georgia pine floors laid in asphalt and concrete. There are eleven elliptical arches made of wrought iron. Each arch is about 187 feet (57 m) wide. The top and bottom chords of each arch have different foci, giving the arches a varying thickness and thereby strengthening them. Above the arches are a roof extension supported by more trusses, as well as a roof made of pine planks; there are two tiers of clerestory windows on the roof. The top of the roof is 100 feet (30 m) above the floor, while the iron trusses are 75 feet (23 m) high. Originally, the drill hall had seating on all four sides, with a capacity of 1,100 people. Platforms and galleries were placed on the west and east walls. In addition, the western wall had walnut gun cabinets, and there was also walnut wainscoting and porcelain reflectors.

Jasper F. Cropsey was responsible for the drill hall's original decoration. The space was originally painted red, white, and blue, the colors of the United States flag. Between 1911 and 1913, the seating capacity was increased to about 3,000. During this renovation, the separate galleries on the west and east walls were replaced with a single gallery accessed by several stairways. In addition, new lights and clerestory windows were installed; the drill hall was repainted in green and gray; and the buttresses were modified or removed. Though the gallery seating was removed in 1955, the galleries still exist, with storage space underneath. In 2010, the trusses were reinforced, and new windows, shades, and lights were installed. By the 2010s, the drill hall was being used by the Park Avenue Armory Conservancy for large-scale artistic programming because of its size; The Wall Street Journal called the drill hall "a blank slate waiting to be transformed however an artist sees fit".

==== Company rooms ====
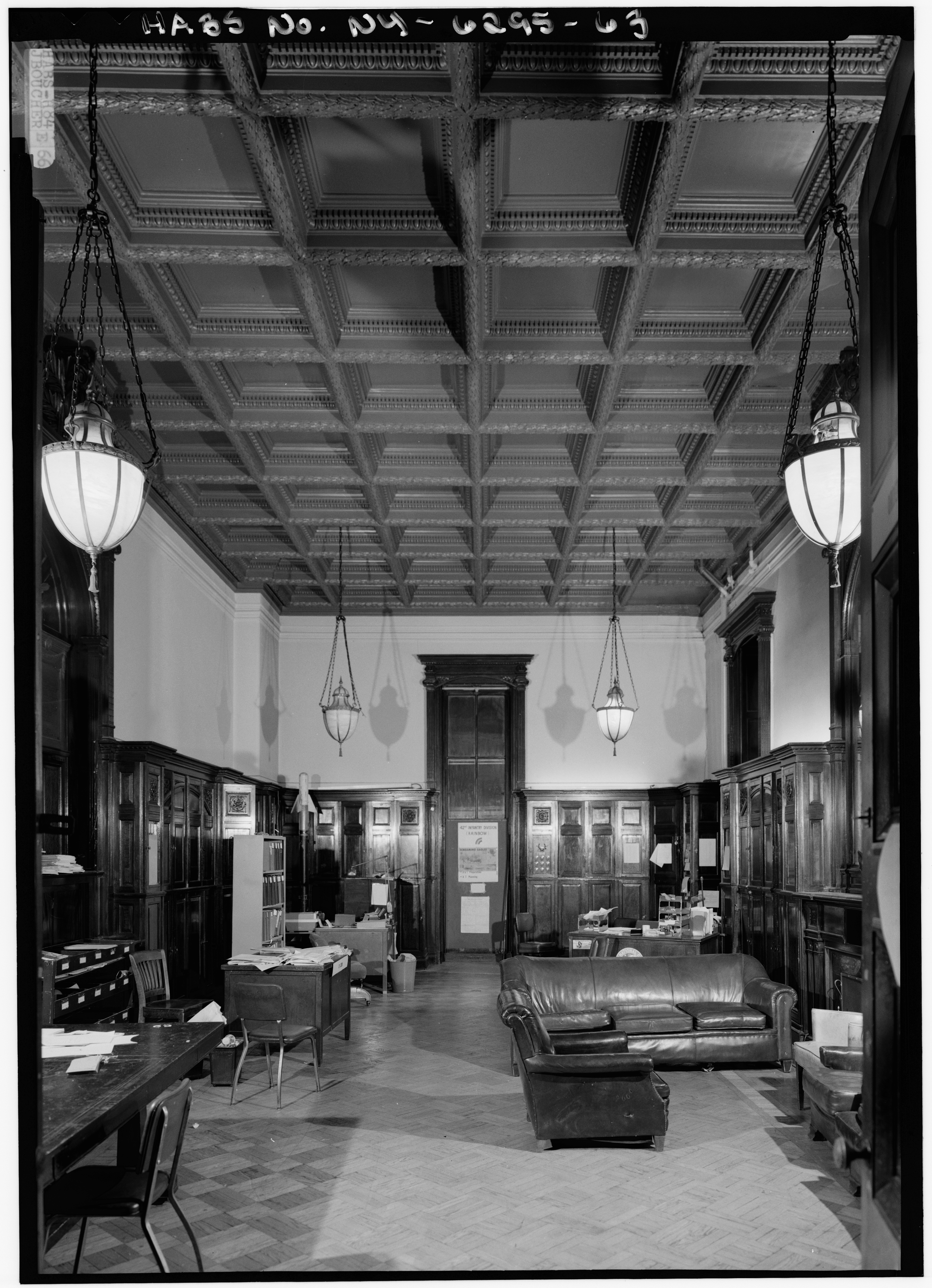
The Company A room

Twelve landmarked company rooms occupy the second floor. The ten original rooms, designed for companies A–K, (Note: The companies were also referred to by number. Companies A, B, C, etc. were also known as the first, second, third, etc., companies; the letter J is skipped, so company K would be the tenth company.) are mostly designed in a Renaissance Revival style, each with a distinct design and layout. Interior designers are attributed for seven of the ten original rooms: Pottier & Stymus designed four rooms for companies D, E, G, and I; Herter Brothers designed two rooms for companies C and H; and Sidney V. Stratton designed a Queen Anne style room for Company K. Though architects are not attributed for the quarters that housed companies A, B, and F, Albert Wagner was definitely involved in the design of Company B's room, and George C. Flint and Alexander Roux were also involved in designing the three rooms. Two additional company rooms, originally designed by Pottier & Stymus as the non-commissioned officers' and adjutant's rooms, were converted to the quarters of companies L and M, respectively, by Robinson & Knust between 1909 and 1913. The Company L room is in the neoclassical style, while the Company M room is in the Tudor Revival style. As of 2024, these rooms house workshops and artists in residence.

Four of the company rooms are located on the east side of the second-floor corridor; from south to north, they housed companies A, M, L, and K. The Company A room on 66th Street is decorated with dark mahogany woodwork and originally had green walls and a blue coved ceiling; a coffered ceiling was installed c. 1897, and there is also a fireplace dating from 1937. The Company M room contains oak woodwork, a fireplace, paneled ceiling, a door to the drill hall's mezzanine, and stairs and a gallery on the east wall. In the Company L room are oak woodwork and a fireplace but has a beamed ceiling and no stairway to its gallery. The Company K room is clad in oak and mahogany and has lockers, cabinetry, a stenciled frieze, a paneled ceiling, and a fireplace mantel. Company K's room was intended as the most ornate of the company rooms and has undergone the least modifications.

The eight company rooms to the west of the corridor housed companies B–I from south to north. Company B's room has mahogany woodwork, Tiffany glass chandeliers, and copper-leaf ceilings; it originally had blue-and-gold walls and a gas chandelier. Mace-shaped lights, a painted ceiling, and oak woodwork, along with some original lighting sconces, are in Company C's room. The room for Company D has elaborately carved mahogany woodwork (including lockers), lamps, a chandelier, and a mantelpiece; it also had ornate stenciling on the walls, frieze, and ceiling. Old woodwork, lamps, and a mantel are similarly in Company E's room, which originally had stenciled red walls and a stenciled terracotta paneled ceiling. The design of Company E's room was revised in 1892 when the ceiling was refinished in a strapwork design, and the walls were covered in Japanese wallpaper. The original stenciling in the rooms of companies D and E was restored in 2013.

The Company F room initially had red stenciled walls and still contains oak woodwork, a chandelier, a paneled ceiling, and plaques commemorating the company's Civil War casualties. In the quarters of Company G, there are carved woodwork, lockers, a mantel, and original polished-steel lamps, although the ceiling paneling and wall stencils were painted over in 1894. Company H's room has oak woodwork, lockers, wall covering, patterned oak ceiling with a cove, a variety of light fixtures, and doorway surrounds. Uniquely among the company rooms, Company I has a balcony on its south wall; it also has mahogany and Brazilian woodwork carvings, some lockers, several door and window surrounds, a fireplace mantel, a beamed ceiling, and two large wrought-iron chandeliers. The second floor also contained two squad drill rooms decorated in Georgia pine.

==== Other spaces ====
Within the basement was a rifle range measuring 300 feet (91 m) long; (Note: This is the figure given by multiple sources. The Manufacturer and Builder gives a different figure of 400 ft (120 m).) it consisted of two parallel brick vaults, each measuring 13 feet (4.0 m) wide. The rifle range had six targets. Also in the basement were heating equipment, storage rooms, and restrooms, which were used as the quarters of the regiment's tennis club and rifle club. The Knickerbocker Greys youth cadet corps also has an office in the basement.

The original third floor had a north–south corridor with wood wainscoting and Georgia pine trim. There were several rooms on the third floor, with ceilings and walls clad with Georgia pine. At the center of that story was a memorial room with tablets commemorating companies C, E, and H. This was flanked by two squad drill rooms, decorated with portraits of officers. The third floor also had a gymnasium; two general-use rooms; a kitchen; and rooms for the regiment's band and the drum corps. When the third floor was reconstructed in 1911, it was used as administrative offices. A new military library occupied half of that story (replacing the ground-story library), and a kitchen occupied the other half. The third-floor library had a Gothic-style ceiling and mahogany shelves.

As part of the 1911 reconstruction, a gymnasium was erected on the fourth floor. This story also contained a smaller drill hall with a stage. The gymnasium was relocated to the fifth floor, which was added in the late 1920s or early 1930s. A mess hall, named after longtime Seventh Infantry commander Daniel Appleton, was built on the fourth floor in 1931. Also on the fourth floor were two gates salvaged from the Union Club of the City of New York's building. By the 1980s, the administration building had two handball courts and two squash courts.

== History ==
What is now the 7th New York Militia Regiment (nicknamed the "Silk Stocking Regiment" because of its members' affluence) was established in 1806 as the 1st, 2nd, 3rd, and 4th companies. The battalion was renamed several times before becoming the 7th Regiment of Infantry, New York State Militia, in 1847. The regiment quelled several civil disturbances in New York City during the mid-19th century, and it served in the American Civil War. The 7th Regiment originally trained in Central Park and other open spaces before moving into the State Arsenal in 1853 or 1854 and the Tompkins Market Armory in 1860. (Note: The Tompkins Market Armory, a cast-iron Italianate structure designed by Charles W. Clinton, was three stories high and was located on what is now Bowery between 6th and 7th Streets. It no longer exists.) The regiment continued to grow over the next two decades, reaching 1,000 men by 1876.

=== Development ===
==== Planning and early fundraising ====
Emmons Clark, the leader of the 7th Regiment, had wanted to erect a new armory as early as 1867. Clark said the Tompkins Market Armory's drill room could fit only two companies at once, and the third floor of the structure was not strong enough to support military exercises. The regiment began seeking a new armory uptown; at the time, most members lived north of 35th Street, making it difficult to mobilize the regiment. Furthermore, the regiment's members perceived the old armory's location on the fringes of the Lower East Side, a tenement district within what is now the East Village, as being less safe than the Upper East Side, which was growing into an upscale neighborhood.

In 1873, the 7th Regiment attempted to obtain a site for a new armory at Reservoir Square (now the site of the New York Public Library Main Branch), but local residents opposed building the armory there. The 7th Regiment then identified a site at Hamilton Square between 66th Street, Fourth (Park) Avenue, 67th Street, and Lexington Avenue for a new armory. A state senator introduced a bill to reserve the site for the 7th Regiment in February 1874, and the bill passed that April. Despite initial skepticism, representatives of the regiment voted to acquire the Hamilton Square site after seeing that most members of the regiment lived nearby. The regiment signed a 21-year lease in September 1874, and it began seeking funds from the city for construction. The Tompkins Market Armory was severely damaged in a fire in mid-1874, leaving that structure without a roof for a year.

The New York City Board of Aldermen authorized the new armory's construction in July 1875, providing up to $350,000 (Note: equivalent to $10,261,000 in 2025) for the armory; (Note: The New-York Tribune gives an erroneous figure of $35,000, but the Baltimore Sun spells out the sum as "three hundred and fifty thousand".) city controller Andrew Haswell Green called the proposed expenditure wasteful. That November, the city's Board of Apportionment voted against granting a mandamus that would have raised the required $350,000 through taxes. The next month, a judge denied the regiment's request to force the Board of Estimate to give them the money. The regiment's board of officers announced in January 1876 that they would raise $330,000 for the armory themselves, (Note: equivalent to $9,977,000 in 2025) and they contacted 1,500 regiment members and veterans for donations. The regiment had raised $36,000 by early February 1876, (Note: equivalent to $1,088,000 in 2025) when the New Armory Fund was officially established. Charles W. Clinton, a veteran of Company K, was hired to design the armory; the regiment approved his designs in May 1876. The fund had $80,000 (Note: equivalent to $2,419,000 in 2025) by that July, but fundraising slowed down over the next year.

==== Construction ====
Work on the building began in early 1877. The cornerstone-laying ceremony, originally scheduled for September 1877, was delayed to October 4 due to a lack of money. Veterans of the 7th Regiment laid the cornerstone on October 13, 1877, after the armory fund had reached $100,000. (Note: equivalent to $3,023,000 in 2025) By then, the armory's foundation walls had been finished, and the drill hall's walls were under construction. The fund had grown to $157,000 by the end of 1877, (Note: equivalent to $4,747,000 in 2025) even as new subscriptions decreased sharply. The 7th Regiment hosted parties and benefit concerts to raise money. By September 1878, the fund had reached $200,000, (Note: equivalent to $6,672,000 in 2025) the administration building's facade was almost complete, and the drill hall's foundation was completed. The drill hall's roof was finished at the end of the year, and the facade was completed in 1879. To cut costs, the armory was constructed out of brick rather than granite.

To fund the remainder of construction, the 7th Regiment contemplated taking out a mortgage loan in early 1879 and was authorized to issue $150,000 in bonds that March. (Note: equivalent to $5,183,000 in 2025) The regiment began issuing bonds in April, and the city extended the regiment's lease of the site indefinitely, on the condition that the building remain in military use. Work on decorations continued through the end of 1879. Visitors were first allowed into the armory on November 17, 1879, when U.S. President Rutherford B. Hayes opened the New Armory Fair. The fair netted $140,550, (Note: equivalent to $4,857,000 in 2025) which was used to fund the armory's completion and decoration of the ornate interiors. The 7th Regiment held its last assembly at the Tompkins Market Armory on April 25, 1880, and it took possession of the new uptown armory the next day. The next month, the regiment received approval from the Armory Committee to lease out the drill hall for events.

=== Opening and early years ===
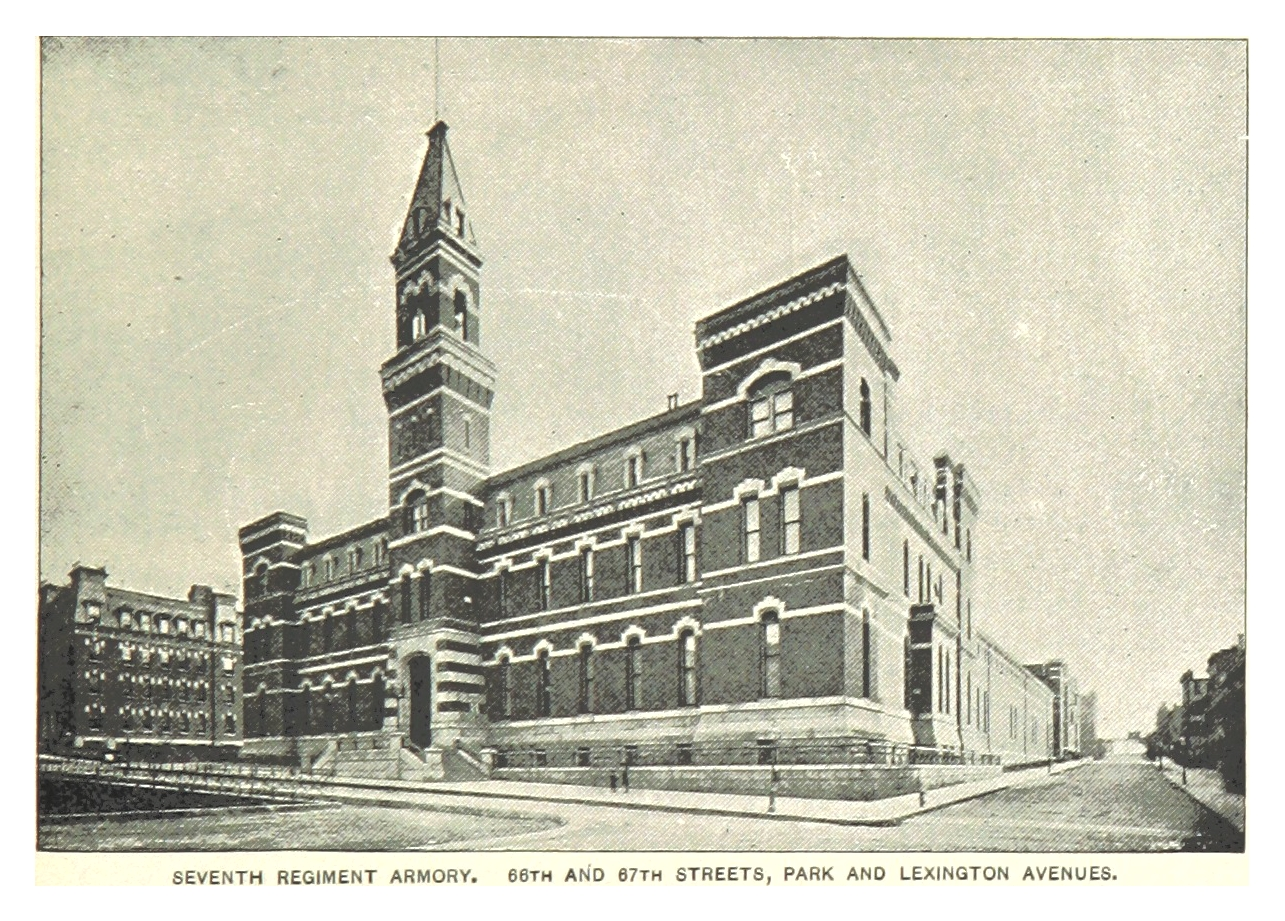
The administration building originally had three stories.

The regiment formally opened the armory on September 30, 1880, and held an "Inauguration Ball" that December 15. The total cost of the armory amounted to $589,438.91, (Note: equivalent to $19,665,000 in 2025) the structure was one of a few armories in the United States built and furnished with private funds. From the outset, the building was owned by its board of trustees, composed of 35 officers who were majors or a higher rank. Upon the armory's opening, the 7th Regiment was reportedly the only one in New York state that owned its building. The armory initially hosted a variety of events such as balls, competitions, meetings, and festivals; it also housed the 7th Regiment Tennis Club. The armory quickly attracted members of New York City's wealthiest families.

The regiment asked the New York City Department of Public Works in 1886 to provide funding for the armory's upkeep. That June, Clark ordered Veterans of the 7th Regiment to vacate the armory, believing that their presence ran counter to the terms of the regiment's lease agreement with the city. Though the veterans' group refused to move, the regiment began allowing outside groups to use the Veterans Room. The city government was also reluctant to fund repairs to the armory, but a state judge ruled in late 1886 that the city was responsible for funding all aspects of the armory's upkeep, including a new heating system. The state legislature then passed a law that provided $8,000 per year for the armory's upkeep when the bonds on the building matured in 1894. Amid continued disputes over the veterans' use of the armory, the veterans' groups split in 1889 because they could not agree on a new meeting location. (Note: The older club was Veterans of the 7th Regiment, which wanted to use the Veterans Room. The newer organization, the 7th Regiment Veteran Club, moved to the Cornelius Vanderbilt II House in December 1889.) Veterans of the 7th Regiment, which wanted to meet in the Veterans Room, unsuccessfully requested an injunction to prevent the regiment from evicting them.

In January 1894, the 7th Regiment paid off the last of the armory's debt. To celebrate this, the regiment hosted a housewarming party that February and hosted an elaborate revue and parade in the drill hall the next month. In April 1896, the 7th Regiment requested that the New York Armory Board authorize the installation of electrical wiring and lighting throughout the building; the request was approved that June, with $30,000 provided for the installation of electric wires and 4,500 lightbulbs. (Note: equivalent to $1,548,000 in 2025) After the Commercial Construction Company unsuccessfully bid for the lighting contract, J. F. Buchanan & Co. was awarded a general contract for lighting in April 1897. Installation of electric wires and lights took place throughout 1897, prompting trustees and company members to complain about the disarray of the armory's interiors. The work was completed by January 1898.

=== 20th century ===
==== 1900s to 1920s ====
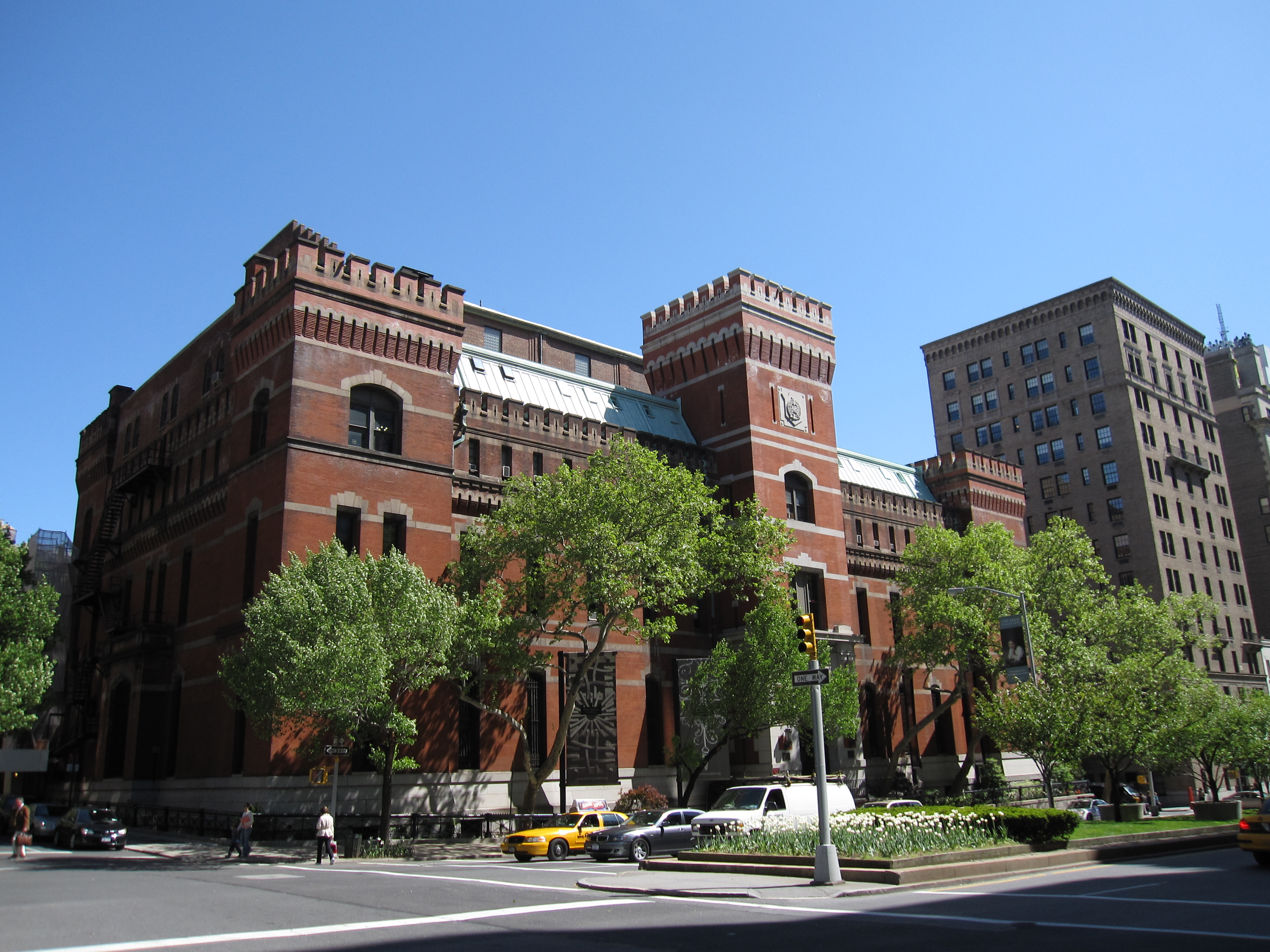
The exterior as seen from the northwest, at 67th Street and Park Avenue

From the late 1890s to the early 1910s, numerous companies renovated their rooms to add new decorations, conduct repairs, or accommodate changes made to the building as a whole. Some of the regiment's companies, such as Company K, retained their respective rooms' original designs, while other companies significantly modified their quarters. Additionally, in 1901, the regiment's trustees indicated their intention to repair the leaky heating system, having sought funding for the project for years. The Armory Board approved repairs to the heating system in July 1902 and hired the James Curran Manufacturing Company to conduct the repairs the next month. From 1902 onward, the armory also hosted the Knickerbocker Greys, a youth cadet corps. Following the passage of a federal law that required all National Guard regiments to have a dozen companies, Company L was created in May 1909, initially occupying a locker room.

The 7th Regiment requested another $210,000 for renovations in April 1909, including $10,000 to further upgrade the heating plant. (Note: The renovations are equivalent to $7,525,000, while the amount allocated for heating upgrades is equivalent to $358,000 in 2025.) That June, Robinson & Knus drew up plans for the armory's renovation; Kelly & Kelly were the general contractors for the project, while Baker, Smith & Co. were hired to modify the heating system. The modifications included space for the newly formed companies L and M, the reconstruction of the third story, and a new fourth story, which roughly doubled the building's usable space. The regiment hosted a party in January 1911 after the renovations were finished. The New York City Board of Aldermen issued $20,300 in bonds to renovate the drill hall in 1912. (Note: equivalent to $677,000 in 2025) The Charles Meads Company was hired for the renovation, which was completed in early 1913; the project involved new seating areas and modifications to accommodate tennis games.

Although the rebuilt drill hall could accommodate more than 5,000 people, visitors criticized its acoustics. The 7th Regiment became the 107th Infantry during World War I. A fourth-story room housing the city's police band was destroyed by fire in 1922. Several tablets were dedicated at the armory in the 1920s, commemorating 7th Regiment troops who had died in World War I. These included tablets dedicated to the fallen members of Company F in 1923, Company B in 1924, and Company A in 1928. Brighter lights were installed in the drill hall in early 1926, following complaints that the lighting levels hindered tennis players in the U.S. National Indoor Championships.

==== 1930s to 1960s ====
Sources disagree on whether the fifth story was built in 1928–1929, 1930, or 1931. After the fifth story was completed, Irving & Casson and A. H. Davenport were hired to design several rooms in the armory. These included the Daniel Appleton Mess Hall, dedicated in March 1931. Irving & Casson and Davenport also renovated the Colonel's Room, historically preserved the Board of Officers Room, and may have been involved in renovating the Field and Staff Room. Several paintings were gifted to the armory in the 1930s and 1940s, including portraits of George VI of England, Gustav III of Sweden, scientist Frederick M. Pedersen, and 107th Infantry commanding officer Harry Disston, as well as a painting of the Battle of Rezonville.

With the onset of World War II, in 1940, the New York state government stopped renting out the armory for civilian events. The same year, the New York Court of Appeals ruled that the city's Board of Estimate had to pay $8,000 annually toward the armory's upkeep, and the 107th Infantry became the 207th Coastal Artillery. In 1941, the 207th Coastal Artillery moved out, and the 7th Regiment of the New York State Guard moved in. The public was allowed to use the armory again in 1943. The 107th Infantry Regiment was revived in 1947, with its headquarters at the armory, and the 199th Army Ground Force Band was also headquartered at the armory in the late 1940s. Although there is documentation stating that ownership of the building was transferred to a veterans' group named the 7th Regiment Fund in 1952, the state government has disputed the documentation, saying that the 7th Regiment's commanding officer was not authorized to transfer ownership.

By the 1950s, there had been multiple proposals to replace the 7th Regiment Armory with a multipurpose building, as the 107th Infantry had outgrown the armory. Although the city and state governments unofficially did not oppose the plan (since they would be able to profit from the new structure), the development would have required renegotiating the regiment's lease of the site. In the meantime, the regiment planned to spend $125,000 on a new roof and $25,000 on repairing the facade. The New York Community Trust installed a plaque on the building in 1959, acknowledging its architectural and historical significance. During the 1960s, the armory was renovated, forcing the relocation of the National Indoor Tennis Championships. The New York City Landmarks Preservation Commission (LPC) designated the armory's facade as a city landmark on June 9, 1967, and a plaque indicating this landmark designation was installed in September 1968. At the time, preservationists had lingering concerns that the building could be torn down.

==== 1970s to 1990s ====
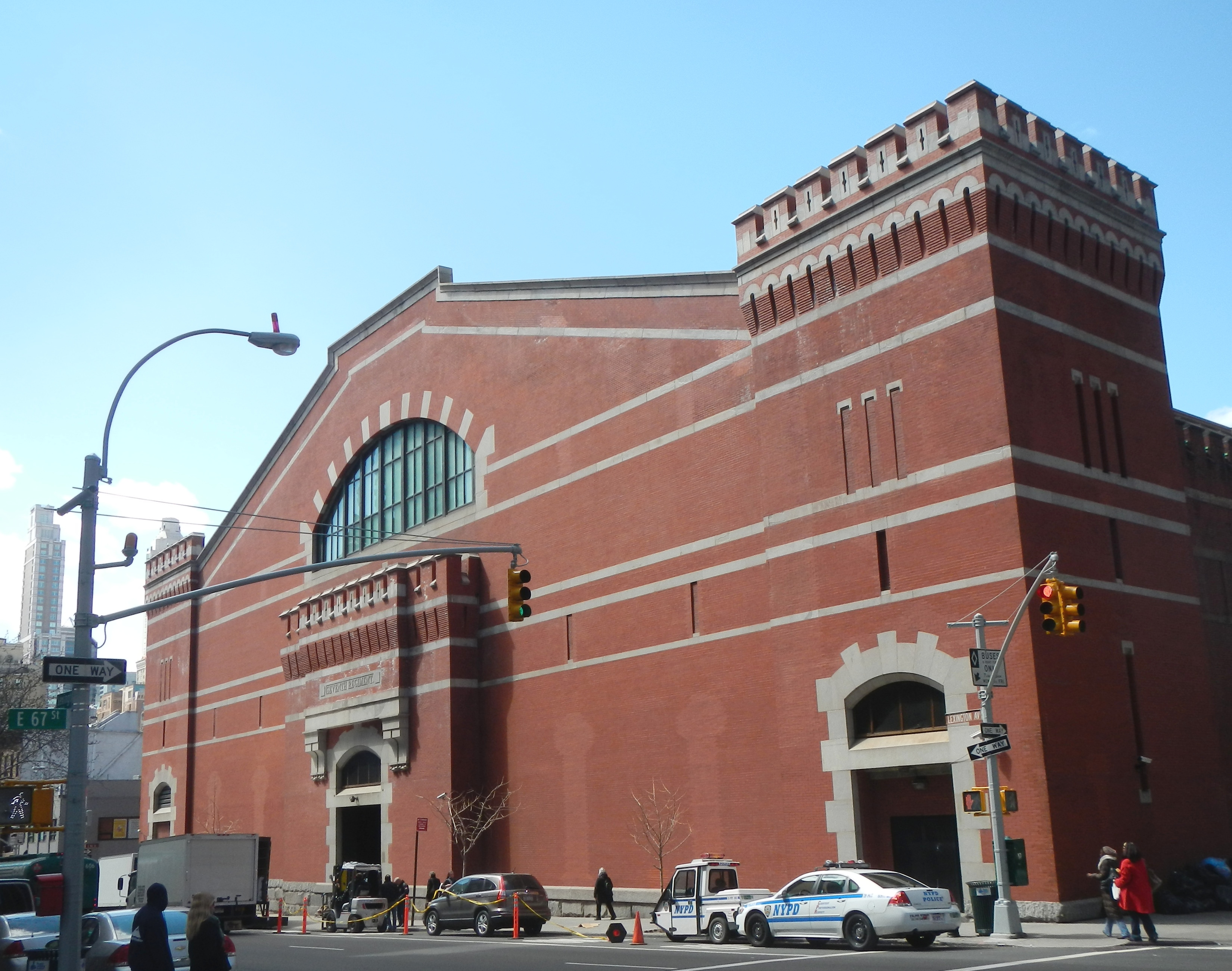
The drill hall on Lexington Avenue

Through the 1970s, the armory was mainly occupied by the Second Brigade of the 42nd Division and the First Battalion of the 107th Infantry. It was periodically open to the public for events, but Manhattan Community Board 8 could not convince the regiment to host neighborhood activities there. The armory, one of two in the city that still hosted tennis matches, rented out the tennis courts in its drill hall to a private club. The dining halls could be rented out, and, the armory housed an extensive collection of military memorabilia such as uniforms and weapons. The building was added to the National Register of Historic Places in 1975. Developers proposed a residential tower above the armory in 1979, prompting protests from 7th Regiment veterans. Despite this, the state government began studying plans in January 1981 to erect a tower over the armory, generating opposition from figures such as former U.S. first lady Jacqueline Kennedy Onassis and U.S. Representative Mario Biaggi. The plan was canceled that March, as officials wished to focus on other development projects.

A men's homeless shelter opened at the armory in January 1983 and initially housed men on the third and fifth floors. At the time, the armory had a restaurant and a squash and tennis club, and it continued to host exhibitions. Neighborhood residents initially supported the shelter, but 7th Regiment veterans filed a lawsuit in March 1984 after state officials announced plans to increase the shelter's capacity from 150 to 400 beds. After a judge imposed a 200-bed limit, state legislator Roy Goodman and the city and state governments became involved in a dispute over the shelter's capacity. City officials ultimately decided to convert the shelter at the 7th Regiment Armory into a women's shelter in mid-1985, citing a shortage in beds for homeless women, and the shelter began accommodating 100 middle-aged and elderly women with mental illnesses. The structure was made a National Historic Landmark in 1986. After the New York State Division of Military and Naval Affairs leased the building to a theatrical company in the late 1980s, the New York Comptroller's office accused the agency of illegally leasing the armory without the comptroller's approval.

The LPC considered designating the 7th Regiment Armory's interior as a landmark by 1992, and several rooms were designated as landmarks on July 19, 1994. During the 1990s, the armory became a major exhibition place for art shows; it hosted 12 art shows per year by 1995, compared with four shows a decade prior. The armory's homeless shelter, which was taken over by Lenox Hill Neighborhood House in 1996, continued to operate next to the antique shows and benefits in the drill hall. That year, the state sued the 7th Regiment Fund for ownership of the memorabilia in the armory; this dispute continued for a decade. This was part of a larger disagreement over maintenance of the building itself. The interiors were severely degraded by the late 1990s: a section of the ceiling on the first floor had crumbled, and two rooms had to be closed off because of flooding. The state rented out the hall for as little $7,000 per day, even as exhibitors predicted that the hall could earn $1 million in seven to ten days.

=== Conversion to arts center ===
==== Request for proposals and opposition ====
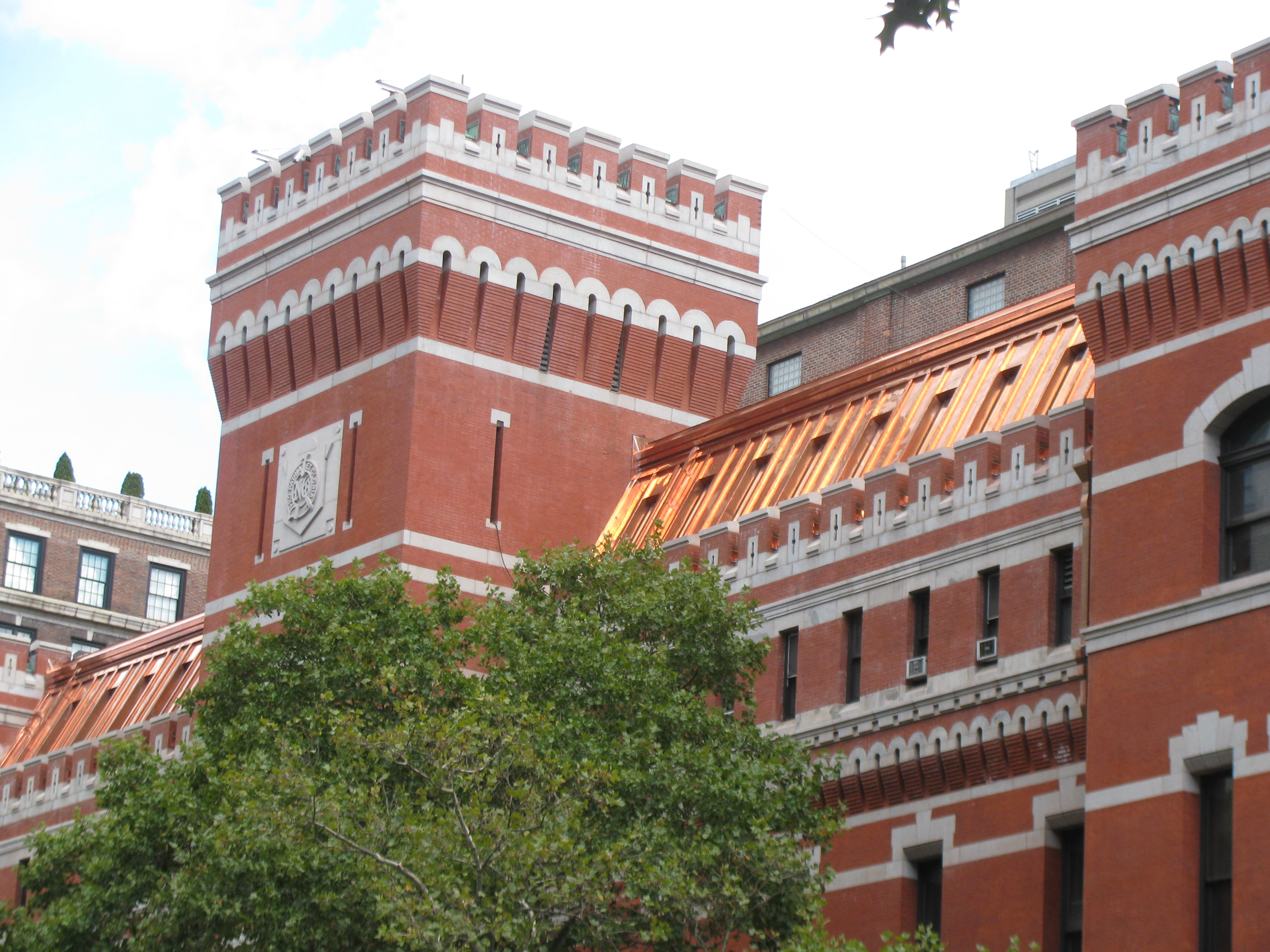
Detail of the administration building's central tower

In March 1999, the state government issued a request for proposals for the armory. At the time, the building was often empty in the summer because it lacked air-conditioning, and the state could not afford to pay for $50 million in repairs. That September, the World Monuments Fund added the armory to its 2000 World Monuments Watch, a list of the world's 100 most endangered sites. State officials began soliciting bids from the armory in mid-2000, following months of consultations with community leaders. The only bidder, the 7th Regiment Armory Conservancy, was awarded control in November 2000. The group (later the Park Avenue Armory Conservancy) was headed by Wade Thompson, Elihu Rose, and Rebecca Robertson and was modeled after the Central Park Conservancy. Initial plans entailed converting the drill hall to a multi-use space with a 4,150-person capacity, which was later limited to 1,500 because of worries that traffic in the area would worsen. The 7th Regiment Armory Conservancy planned to spend $100 million on repairs upon signing a 99-year lease. The plans for the armory's renovation did not include retaining the women's shelter, prompting contentious debates.

The National Guard briefly used the armory as a command center in the aftermath of the September 11 attacks, displacing the events that were normally exhibited there. Events and shows returned to the building in February 2002. At the time, the 53rd Digital Liaison Detachment of the New York Army National Guard also occupied part of the armory. Veterans of the 7th Regiment continued to dispute the state's plan to lease out the armory, as they feared that a new tenant could remove the regiment's artifacts, and they wanted to turn it into a military museum. Meanwhile, the building continued to deteriorate. In the early 2000s, the Whitney Museum contemplated leasing the entire armory as a secondary location and hosting the Whitney Biennial there, but these plans were unsuccessful.

In an attempt to prevent the Empire State Development Corporation from taking over the armory, 7th Regiment veterans sued mayor Michael Bloomberg and governor George Pataki in early 2005. The state government began hosting public hearings for the armory's proposed renovation that July. The state awarded $30 million for the renovation later that year, and the Port Authority of New York and New Jersey contributed another $25 million. A state judge ruled in June 2006 that the New York state government owned the armory's artifacts. The veterans and the conservancy continued to disagree over the building plans. As part of a 2006 agreement, 100 homeless women were allowed to stay on the upper stories. The 7th Regiment Armory Conservancy took over the armory on December 14, 2006.

==== Renovation ====
In 2007, the 7th Regiment Armory Conservancy began hosting art exhibitions and performances and significantly increased rental rates for the fairs that occupied the drill hall, adjusting for market rates, to $30,000 per day. After the conservancy announced plans to open a restaurant and art venue, 7th Regiment veterans filed a lawsuit that August, seeking to rescind the conservancy's lease. Significant opposition to the conservancy's plans also came from local residents like Henry Kravis and Mike Wallace. Opponents of the armory's conversion cited the fact that large-scale performances at the armory would create heavy traffic congestion, while supporters denied these claims. Thompson donated $35 million toward the armory's restoration in December 2007, and the conservancy began renovating the building for $215 million, By the late 2000s, the building was known as the Park Avenue Armory. The conservancy completed $68 million worth of renovations in 2010, which included upgrades to acoustic, structural, and mechanical systems. The project included a new heating, ventilation, and air conditioning system; new restrooms; a connection to the New York City steam system; and electrical upgrades. The facades on Lexington and Park Avenues were also renovated in 2010 and 2013, respectively.

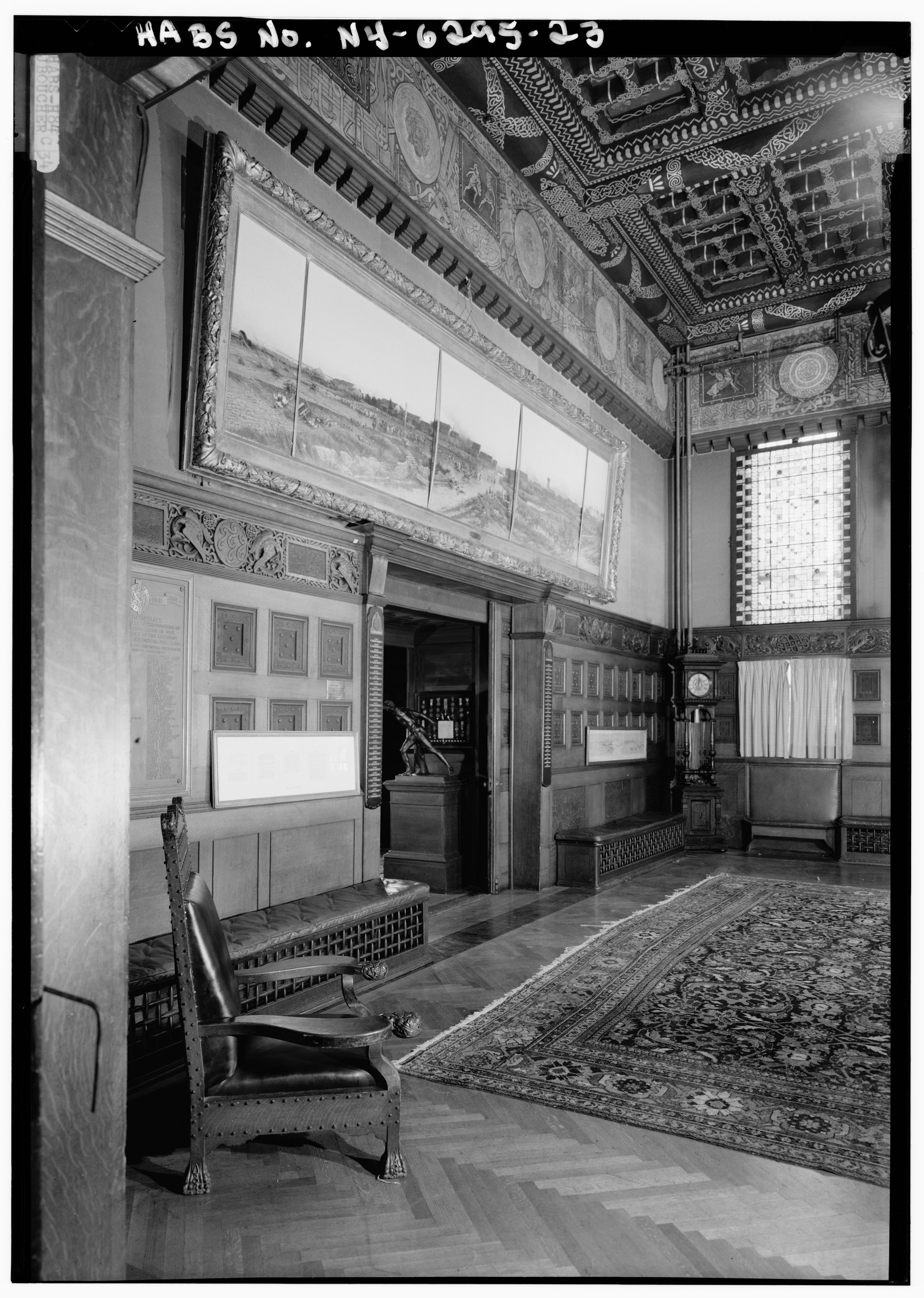
The Veterans Room was restored between 2015 and 2016.

During the early 2010s, the Park Avenue Armory Conservancy began hosting art, concerts, plays, and operas at the armory; most complaints about the armory's conversion to an arts venue had subsided. The Swiss architectural firm Herzog & de Meuron was hired to restore the interior of the Park Avenue Armory, completing a renovation of the Officers Room in late 2013. There were also plans to install a green roof on the administration building. By the mid-2010s, the armory was a major art venue, hosting exhibitions that were too large to fit elsewhere. The Thompson Family Foundation donated $65 million for programming at the Park Avenue Armory in July 2015; in exchange, the complex was renamed the Thompson Arts Center at Park Avenue Armory for 50 years. Herzog & de Meuron began a restoration of the Veterans Room in April 2015, and the room reopened in March 2016.

The Park Avenue Armory Conservancy began restoring the floors in 2018 for $4 million, of which around half came from the New York City government. At the time, it planned to raise $49 million for further improvements. The armory was temporarily closed during 2020 due to the COVID-19 pandemic in New York City, and the drill hall was retrofitted with an air-filtration system; artists also used the vacant drill hall as rehearsal space. Robertson wanted to reopen the armory in October 2020 with capacity sharply reduced to 96 to allow for adequate social distancing. However, the reopening was delayed because several performers had been diagnosed with COVID-19 and because of the armory's adherence to strict health protocols. The venue did not reopen until March 2021; regular programming resumed later that year. The conservancy attempted to evict the Knickerbocker Greys in 2022 to make way for additional event space. Although the conservancy ultimately dropped its lawsuit, the efforts led New York state legislators to propose a bill preventing the Greys' eviction; the bill became law in 2024.

== Notable events ==
Until the 2010s, most of the armory's events were held in the drill hall. The LPC wrote that the room was "of enormous importance in the social and cultural life of the regiment over the years", and Nancy Todd called the armory as a whole "one of the first armories to serve as a civic center" in New York state. The Washington Post described the armory as "a protean play space, some inspiring combination of coliseum, soundstage and great chamber".

=== 19th century ===
The first event hosted at the armory was the New Armory Fair, hosted by the 7th Regiment in the last two months of 1879. The building's first event after its opening, the Inauguration Ball on December 15, 1880, attracted 38,000 guests. The drill hall's first concert took place in May 1881, when Walter Damrosch directed the "Music Festival", which attracted 10,000 spectators. The 7th Regiment also started hosting annual athletic competitions at its armory by March 1882, including races and tug-of-war contests. The armory continued to host sports competitions through the 1890s, including shooting contests and baseball games, as well as contests such as running, cycling, and roller-skating races. By 1897, the armory had hosted more than thirty games for the regiment's Athletic Association.

Other events at the armory in its first decade included elaborate galas, lawn tennis games, vocalists' concerts, and the annual musters and inspections of the 7th Regiment's troops. In addition, Albert I of Belgium visited the armory in 1898.

=== 20th century ===
==== Sporting events ====
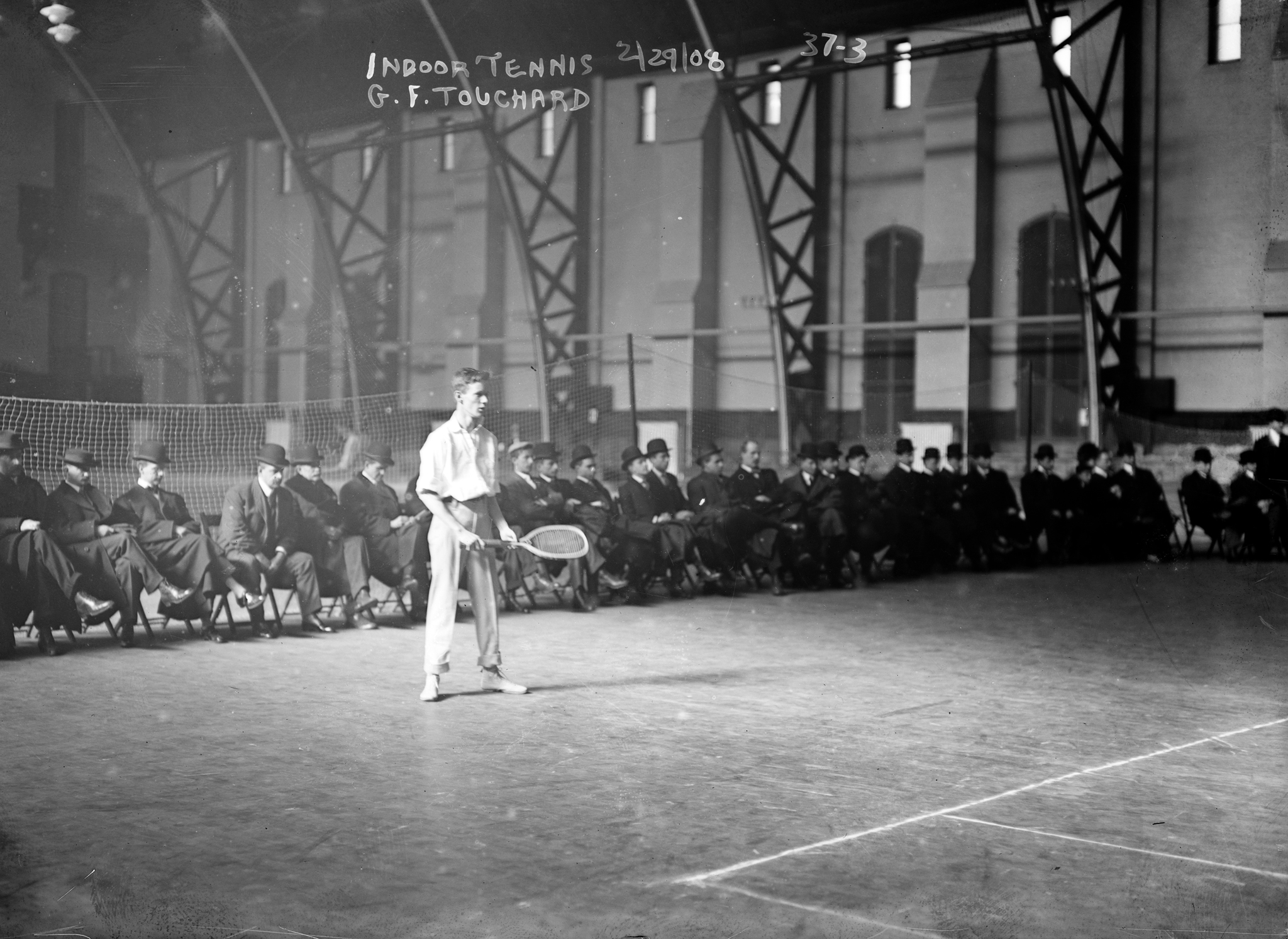
Gustave F. Touchard at the 1908 U.S. National Indoor Tennis Championships

The armory started hosting the U.S. National Indoor Tennis Championships in 1900; the tennis matches took place in the drill hall, which could house eight tennis courts. The tennis championships continued at the armory even during World War I, when the venue was closed to the public. The women's championship moved to Boston in the early 1920s but was hosted at the 7th Regiment Armory again by the 1930s. The National Indoor Championships occurred at the armory annually until 1940. The championship moved out of the 7th Regiment Armory in 1963 because of ongoing renovations. The armory also hosted the Clean Air Tennis Classic in 1972 and housed a tennis club through the late 20th century.

In the early 20th century, the armory also hosted other sporting events, such as athletic meets between schools, the regiment's annual athletic games, track-and-field races, junior tennis championships, and weekly shooting contests. The city's social settlement houses also hosted athletic competitions within the armory starting in 1903. By the 1940s, the armory was hosting squash games as well.

==== Other events ====
The armory's events, which included fairs, balls, games, concerts, and drills, were attended by figures such as the Prince of Wales Edward VIII in the 1920s and Queen Elizabeth the Queen Mother in 1954. The venue hosted several events for the 7th Regiment. The interiors were elaborately rethemed to such varied locales as Egypt, Mars, and the Swiss Alps for the regiment's annual autumn ball. The annual military ball, which attracted thousands of guests, was suspended between 1940 and 1948. Annual reviews of the 7th Regiment continued during the 20th century, including during World War II. In the 1950s, the armory hosted a celebration of Company K's centennial and the regiment's 150th-anniversary.

In the early 20th century, the armory hosted performances such as a ballet in 1914 and a burlesque revue in 1923. There were some non-athletic competitions, such as Boy Scouts events and chess matches. The armory also held military exercises, concerts, dance shows, dance balls, charity balls, and debutante balls. The 1937 live broadcast of the radio play The Fall of the City by Archibald MacLeish took place at the armory, and the building's first-ever Mass occurred in 1941. The armory also hosted fundraisers, birthday celebrations, dinners, and graduation ceremonies for Hunter College. The wakes of Robert P. Patterson in 1952, Douglas MacArthur in 1964, and Louis Armstrong in 1971 took place at the armory. Some plays were also hosted at the 7th Regiment Armory, such as some William Butler Yeats works in 1959 and Tamara in 1987. The armory also hosted the congregations of St. George's Episcopal Church in 1963 and Central Synagogue in 1998 after their respective buildings were damaged.

The building has hosted large events and exhibitions such as the 1916 convention of the General Federation of Women's Clubs, the Girl Scouts' annual spring reviews, and the New York Poultry Show. From the 1950s onward, the armory hosted events and exhibits such as scientific expositions, interior design shows, sailboat shows, airplane exhibits, rare-book fairs, the Women's International Exposition, the International Motor Sports Show, the National Postage Show, and auctions hosted by Guernsey's. The Winter Antiques Show began in 1954 and remained at the armory for the rest of the century. Other recurring shows included the National Arts and Antiques Festival, since 1964; the show Modernism: A Century of Style and Design, 1860–1960, since 1986; the Art Dealers Association of America's Art Show, since 1989; the International Antique Dealers Show, since 1989; the Print Fair, since 1991; and the International Asian Art Fair, from 1996 to 2007.

=== 21st century ===
At the beginning of the 21st century, the building hosted events such as a rally for 9/11 survivors, military award ceremonies, a memorial service for Merce Cunningham, and an exhibit on its own history. The armory continued to host recurring shows like the Winter Antiques Show, the International Fine Art and Antiques Show, and the New York Antiquarian Book Fair, as well as the International Tribal and Textile Arts Show and the 2008 Whitney Biennial. It moved toward hosting performances during the early 21st century. The venue's first performance art piece was a 2007 motorcycle performance choreographed by Aaron Young, and the first piece commissioned by Park Avenue Armory Conservancy was presented in 2009 by Ernesto Neto. The armory's increased focus on performances forced the relocation of the New York Art, Antique & Jewelry Show in 2015.

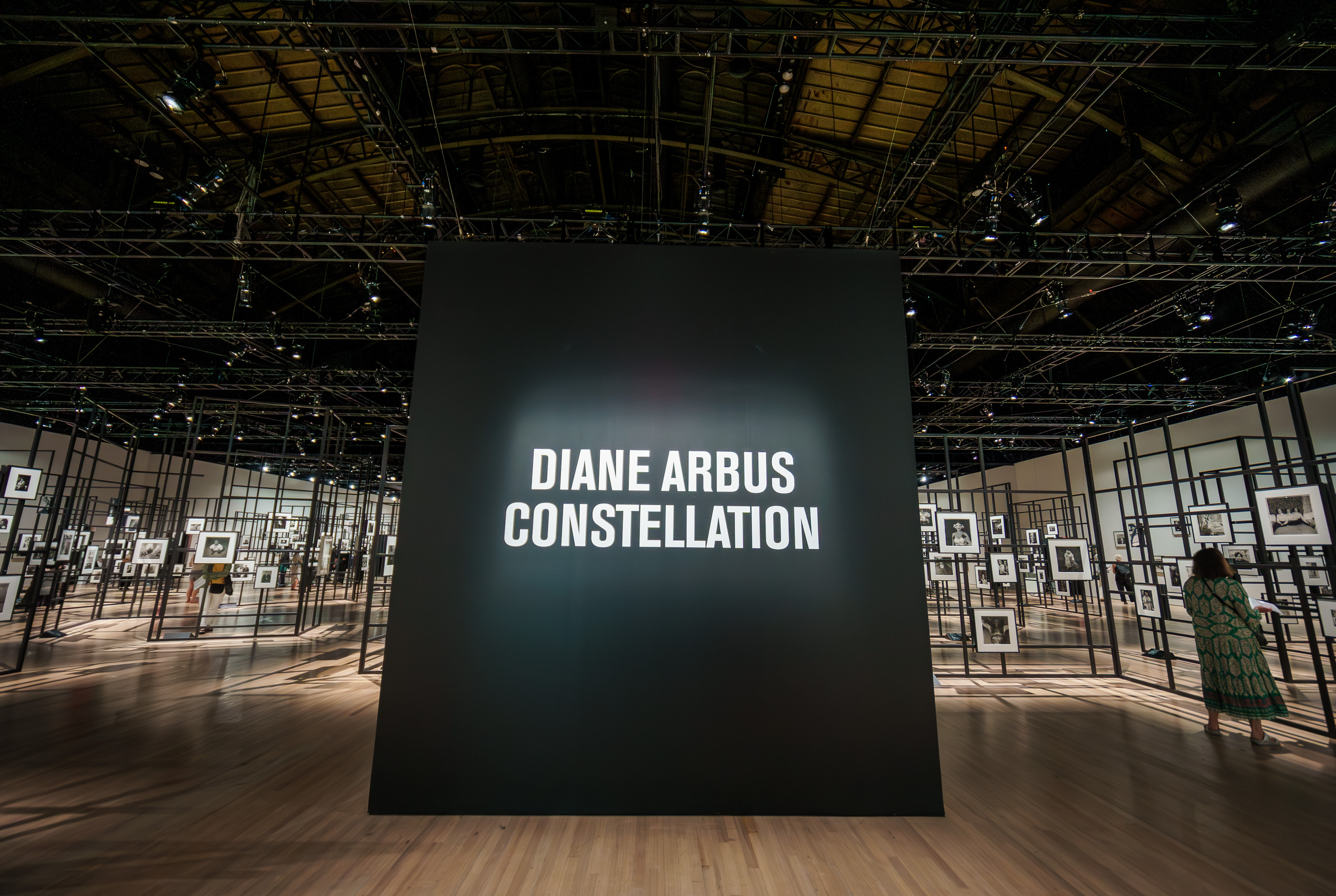
Diane Arbus Constellation in 2025

During the 2000s and 2010s, the drill hall hosted musical performances such as those by Lincoln Center Festival, the Tune-in Music Festival, the New York Philharmonic, and the Berlin Philharmonic. As the building's resident nonprofit arts organization, the Park Avenue Armory Conservancy has hosted and created music, dance, theater, and multidisciplinary artistic works in the drill hall and other spaces. In the 2010s, those included works by Douglas Gordon, Nick Cave, Martin Creed, William Kentridge, and Hito Steyerl, as well as New York City's first powwow in over 200 years. The armory's shows in the 2020s have included a tribute to the 19th Amendment; award-winning dramas that have transferred to Broadway such as The Lehman Trilogy and the musical Illinoise; music recitals, and immersive art. The armory continues to host annual galas.

In the 2010s and 2020s, the armory has continued to rent its space to art fairs including The European Fine Art Fair, the International Fine Print Dealers Association Print Fair, and TEFAF New York, as well as fashion shows. In 2025, the armory hosted the largest ever retrospective of the photography of Diane Arbus, with 454 prints.

== Reception and influence ==
When the armory was completed, the Veterans Room was characterized as having tiles that gleamed "as if a bit of the Atlantic furthest from shore had been caught and pressed into service". Veterans of the 7th Regiment, in a private booklet published in 1881, wrote that "what most impresses, and what is most worthy to impress, is the artistic treatment of this Veterans' Room..." William C. Brownell criticized the Veterans Room and library the same year, saying that Tiffany should devote "his further effort to a mere harmonizing of possible discords". The King's Handbook of New York described the rooms in 1892 as being "beautifully decorated and elegantly furnished", while an 1895 source called the armory "a handsome building well adapted for its purposes". After the building's expansion in 1911, the New-York Tribune wrote that the armory was "distinctly military" but "represents a great military club".

Robert A. M. Stern and the co-authors of his 1999 book New York 1880 wrote that the armory "set a standard of quality in the care taken with the building itself and especially in the lavish appointments on the interior that was never achieved elsewhere". The New York Times described the armory in 2000 as an "impressive though dilapidated red-brick fortress", and New York magazine called the armory "Long the most impressive interior space in New York" in 2013. The Times described the veterans' room in 2016 as being "as close as any room in New York City comes to such beyond-words fantasia" as the ornate room described in Alain Robbe-Grillet's story The Secret Room, while the Financial Times called that room "an Aladdin's cave of ornate detail". Zachary Woolfe of The New York Times wrote in 2025 that the Board of Officers Room was "an ornate delight" but, compared with other performance venues around the city, had relatively few opportunities for visitation.

The Hartford Courant wrote in 2007 that the 7th Regiment Armory and others in the city inspired the construction of "a great array of medieval fortresses" across U.S. cities. The armory had been one of the first major National Guard armory projects. Later armories were typically divided into an administration building and a drill hall, similar to the 7th Regiment Armory.

== See also ==
- Champagne Unit
- List of National Historic Landmarks in New York City
- List of armories and arsenals in New York City and surrounding counties
- List of New York City Designated Landmarks in Manhattan from 59th to 110th Streets
- National Register of Historic Places listings in Manhattan from 59th to 110th Streets
- Squadron A Armory
- 69th Regiment Armory
