= Aaron Young =

Aaron Young may refer to:

- Aaron Young (artist), based in New York
- Aaron Young (footballer) (born 1992), Australian rules football player
- Aaron Young (curler) from 2013 Molson Canadian Men's Provincial Curling Championship
