= Park Avenue Armory Conservancy =

Nonprofit cultural institution

- Park Avenue Armory
- Interactive map of Park Avenue Armory Conservancy
- Address: 643 Park Avenue; New York, NY 10065
- Coordinates: 40°46′02″N 73°57′55″W
- Operator: Deborah Warner (Artistic Director)

Construction
- Architects: Platt Byard Dovell White and Herzog & de Meuron

Website
- www.armoryonpark.org

The Park Avenue Armory Conservancy is a nonprofit cultural institution at the historic Park Avenue Armory building on New York City's Upper East Side. The institution displays unconventional artwork, including performing and visual arts.

== History ==
In March 1999, the New York state government issued a request for proposals for the Park Avenue Armory. At the time, the building needed $50 million in repairs, which the state could not afford. State officials began soliciting bids from the armory in mid-2000, following months of consultations with community leaders. The only bidder, the 7th Regiment Armory Conservancy, was awarded control in November 2000. The group (later the Park Avenue Armory Conservancy) was headed by Wade Thompson, Elihu Rose, and Rebecca Robertson and was modeled after the Central Park Conservancy.

The Park Avenue Armory Conservancy leased the building for 99 years from New York State in 2006. The conservancy took over the armory on December 14, 2006, and spent $215 million over the next decade and a half renovating the Park Avenue Armory.

== Arts programs ==
The Armory's first three years of artistic programming presented work in partnership with other cultural institutions such as Lincoln Center and the Whitney Museum of American Art before launching its first solo exhibitions with Ernesto Neto's anthropodino in 2009 and Christian Boltanski’s No Man's Land in 2010. The Armory then engaged consulting artistic director Kristy Edmunds to develop its first two full artistic seasons for 2011 and 2012. The 2013 season was curated by the incoming artistic director Alex Poots. By 2011, the conservancy had a budget of $133 million.

The Washington Post wrote in 2022 that the Park Avenue Armory Conservancy had helped "plant a vital new flag in New York City’s teeming landscape of the arts".

As of 2026, the conservancy's artistic director is Deborah Warner. She was appointed to replace Pierre Audi after the latter died in 2025.

== Notable shows and events ==
Under the Park Avenue Armory Conservancy's operation, the armory's first performance art piece was a 2007 motorcycle performance choreographed by Aaron Young. The first piece commissioned by Park Avenue Armory Conservancy was presented in 2009 by Ernesto Neto.

In 2020, the Park Avenue Armory Conservancy invited 10 New York City cultural institutions to commission 100 women artists to create new work that celebrates the ratification of the 19th Amendment. The program will be known as "100 Years | 100 Women". Minerva a portrait of Minerva was commissioned from Elizabeth Colomba. This is the first work by a Black artist in the Armory.
