= Patrick Hill =

Patrick Hill may refer to:

- Patrick Joseph Hill, one of the Birmingham Six, six innocent men sentenced to life imprisonment in 1975 in England for the Birmingham pub bombings.
- Patrick Hill (artist) (born 1972), artist based in Los Angeles
- Patrick Seager Hill (1915–2010), British clothing manufacturer
- Pat Hill (born 1951), American football coach

== See also ==
- Pat Hills
