= Champagne unit =

Low-risk military unit for the affluent

A champagne unit is a US military unit staffed by celebrities or people from wealthy or politically powerful families. Such units had often been part of the National Guard, and assigned to lower-risk duty inside the United States. The term is pejorative, with the connotation that such units were havens for those with connections who wished to avoid conscription into more dangerous duty while still gaining the prestige afforded in the United States to military service. Over a century earlier, such a unit was called a silk-stocking regiment after the New York's 7th Regiment, whose well-off members built their own armory, the Seventh Regiment Armory on the Upper East Side of Manhattan.

== Vietnam War ==
During the Vietnam War, serving in the Army and Air National Guard or the military Reserve components was generally regarded as a guaranteed way to avoid the dangers of combat. Although National Guard and Reserve units had been called to active duty in every war since they were founded, the risk was extremely low in the late 1960s and early 1970s. Only 8,700 of these servicemen were ordered to South Vietnam, a tiny 0.3% of the total American military personnel who actually served there. Furthermore, a greatly disproportionate number of famous, wealthy, or politically connected young men received hard to get places in the National Guard or Reserves during Vietnam, including 360 professional athletes such as Bill Bradley and Nolan Ryan.

Commenting on this disparity, General Colin Powell wrote in his autobiography, "I am angry that so many sons of the powerful and well placed and many professional athletes (who were probably healthier than any of us) managed to wrangle slots in Reserve and National Guard units. Of the many tragedies of Vietnam, this raw class discrimination strikes me as the most damaging to the ideal that all Americans are created equal and owe equal allegiance to our country."

=== 147th Fighter Group ===
One well known champagne unit was the Texas Air National Guard's 147th Fighter Interceptor Group, at Ellington Field in Houston. During the Vietnam War many well-connected sons served in this unit, sometimes with the help of politicians such as Ben Barnes.

- Lloyd Bentsen Jr., son of Lloyd Bentsen
- George W. Bush, son of George H. W. Bush
- John Connally III, son of John Connally Jr.
- the son of John Tower
- James R. Bath
- seven members of the Dallas Cowboys

== Decline ==
The Total Force Policy, implemented by General Creighton Abrams in the aftermath of the Vietnam War, eliminated the National Guard and Reserve as safe havens from combat. In contrast to the Vietnam War, National Guard and Reserve units in 2004 comprised 40 percent of all US military forces serving in Iraq. As of 2006, 270,000 National Guard members (60% of the total force) had been deployed overseas for the maximum amount of time allowed by military regulations.

== See also ==
- Richard Blumenthal
- George W. Bush military service controversy
