= Aaron Young (artist) =

American artist based in New York City (born 1972)

Aaron Young (born 1972) is an American artist based in New York City. Young's work became known when MoMA purchased video documentation of his student project involving a motorcyclist repeatedly cycling around the San Francisco Art Institute.

== Early life and education ==
Young was born in Salinas, California Where he attended Salinas High School (Class of 1990). He earned a Bachelor of Fine Arts from San Francisco Art Institute and a Master of Fine Arts from Yale School of Art.

== Career ==
Young works in sculpture, performance, photography and drawing.

Young is influenced by his former professor, Tony Labat, and the dangerous performance work carried out by Chris Burden in the 1960s.

=== Solo exhibitions ===
2011

- ALWAYS FOREVER NOW, Almine Rech, Paris, France
- SPIT & FIGHT CURSE & BITE, Carlson/Massimo de Carlo, London, UK
- BUILT TOUGH, Bortolami Gallery, New York, NY

2010

- Museo Civico Diocesano of Santa Maria dei Servi, Città della Pieve (PG) Italy
- MACRO (Museo d’Arte Contemporanea), Rome, Italy
- Teatro di Marcello, Rome, Italy
- Repeat Offender, Kukje Gallery, Seoul, Korea
- THE RIGHT WAY TO DO WRONG, Gagosian Gallery, Los Angeles

2009

- SEMPER IDEM, Galerie Almine Rech, Brussels
- Pan Museum, Naples
- Galerie Almine Rech, Paris

2008

- PUNCHLINE, Bortolami Gallery, New York
- Arc Light, Moscow, Gagosian Gallery, Moscow
- Smoke Flows in all Directions, Naples, Italy
- Pit Stop, Tit Stop, The Fireplace Project, East Hampton, NY

2007

- Greeting Card, Park Avenue Armory

2006

- Art Positions, Art Basel Miami Beach, Florida
- 1%, Harris Lieberman, New York
- Aaron Young, Kunst-Werke, Berlin, Germany (catalogue)

2005

- Kick the Dog, Herzilya Museum of Contemporary Art, Herzilya, Israel (catalogue)
- Never Work (Bootlegs and other operations), Sister Gallery, Los Angeles

2004

- Tender Buttons, Midway Contemporary Art, Minneapolis

=== Group exhibitions ===
2012

- Rebel, Museum of Contemporary Art, Los Angeles, CA

2011

- Fresh Kills, Anonymous Gallery, Mexico City
- George Herms : Xenophilia (Love of the Unknown), curated by Neville Wakefield, MOCA Pacific Design Center, Los Angeles
- Post 9-11, OHWOW, Los Angeles, CA
- With One Color, curated by Paul McCabe, Van de Weghe Fine Art, New York, NY
- California Dreamin - Myths And Legends Of Los Angeles, Curated by Hedi Slimane, Galerie Almine Rech, Paris, France

2010

- Yotta Paintings, Massimo De Carlo, Milan, Italy
- Exhibition Exhibition, curated by Adam Carr, Castello di Rivoli, Turin, Italy
- Re-Dressing, Bortolami Gallery, New York
- Celebration 8, Macedonian Museum of Contemporary Art, Athens
- I WANT TO SEE HOW YOU SEE, Julia Stoschek Collection, Dichtor Hallen Aktuelle Kunst Haus Der Photographie, Hamburg
- Brucennial, curated by Vito Schnabel, New York
- Wall & Floor, Galerie Almine Rech, Paris, France
- Light Breaks Where No Sun Shines, Bortolami Gallery at The Webster, Miami

2009

- IT AIN’T FAIR 2009, OHWOW, Miami Beach
- Rotating Views #2 - Works from the Astrup Fearnley Collection, Astrup Fearnley Museum Modern Art, Oslo, Norway
- Play, Paradise Row, in collaboration with Prakke Contemporary, London
- 100 Years (Version #2, PS1) Julia Stoschek Foundation, PS1, New York
- Spite House, Lawrimore Project, Seattle, WA
- Abstract America: New Painting and Sculpture, Saatchi Gallery, London
- The End, The Andy Warhol Museum, Pittsburgh, PA
- Fragile, Julia Stoschek Collection, Düsseldorf, Germany

2008

- Political/Minimal, curated by Klaus Biesenbach, KW Institute for Contemporary Art, Berlin and The Muzeum Sztuki in Lodz, Poland, 2009
- The Unforgiven, Stellan Holm Gallery, NY
- Off, Off Bowery, Curators Aaron Bondaroff & Jen Brill, Chez Colette, Paris, France
- For What You Are About To Receive, Red October Chocolate Factory, Moscow, Russia
- Shaping a space II, Mário Sequeira Gallery, Braga, Portugal
- Murder Letters, Galeria Filomena Soares, Lisbon, Portugal
- United Artist Ltd., Marfa, TX
- Substraction, Deitch Projects, New York, curated by Nicola Vassell

2007

- Pop Art is: Gagosian Gallery, London
- Invisible Colours, Marian Goodman, Paris
- Uncertain States of America, Rudolfinum Gallery, Prague, Czech Republic
- Grups, Hydra School Project, Hydra, Greece
- No. 1: Destroy she said, Julia Stoschek Collection, Düsseldorf, Germany
- Beneath the Underdog, Gagosian Gallery, curated by Nate Lowman and Adam McEwen (catalogue)
- Last Attraction, Next Exit, Max Wigram Gallery, London
- Dark Victory, Ileana Tounta Contemporary, Athens
- Uncertain States of America, CSW Centrum Sztuki, Wspolczesneij/Center for Contemporary Art Ujazdowski Castle, Warsaw, Poland
- Uncertain States of America, Herning Kunstmuseum, Herning, Denmark
- ParisStop Jalouse Magazine, Palais de Tokyo, Paris
- Works from the Berezdivin collection, Museo de Arte de Puerto Rico, Puerto Rico
- 2nd Moscow Biennale for Contemporary Art, Moscow

2006

- View (Eleven): Upstate, Curated by Amy Smith-Stewart, Mary Boone Gallery, New York
- Uncertain States of America, Serpentine Gallery, London, U.K.
- Yes Bruce Nauman, Zwirner & Wirth, New York
- Uncertain States of America, American Art in the Third Millennium, Hessel Museum of Art & Center for Curatorial Studies Galleries at Bard College, New York, NY, U.S.A.
- Whitney Biennial 2006, Whitney Museum of American Art, New York
- Action, FRAC PACA, Marseille, France
- The Show Will Be Open When The Show Will Be Closed, Curated by Adam Carr, STORE gallery and various locations, London and the Kadist Art Foundation, Paris

Survivor, Curated by David Rimanelli, Bortolami Dayan, New York

- Mid-Life Crisis, Salander-O’Reilly, New York
- Montezuma’s Revenge, Nicole Klagsbrun, New York
- Globalizacion: indicaciones/efectos secundarios/advertencias, Espacio 1414, Santurce, Puerto Rico

2005

- Uncertain States Of America, curated by Hans Ulrich Obrist, Daniel Birnbaum and Gunnar B. Kvaran, Museum of Modern Art, Oslo, Norway; traveling to Reykjavik Museum of Art; Center for Curatorial Studies, Bard College, Annandale-on-Hudson, New York; Serpentine Gallery, London; Centre of Contemporary Art, Warsaw; Moscow; Musee de Sérignan, Sérignan and Songzhuang Art Center, Beijing (catalogue)
- NEW ART. NEW YORK: Reflections on the Human Condition, Traun and Salzburg, Austria

(catalogue)

- DAY LABOR, P.S.1/MOMA Long Island City, NY (catalogue)
- NEW PHOTOGRAPHY, JJC Museum, Kansas City, KS (catalogue)
- New Acquisitions, Museum of Modern Art, New York
- Bridge Freeze Before Road, Barbara Gladstone Gallery, New York (catalogue)
- Sticks and Stones, Perry Rubenstein Gallery, New York
- Greater New York 2005, P.S.1/MOMA, Long Island City, (catalogue)
- Withdrawal, Galerie Chez Valentin, Paris
- PREMIERES, Museum Of Modern Art, New York
- Curatorial Choices: Drawing, University of Minnesota Museum, St. Paul, MN

2004

- Always Already Passé, Gavin Brown Enterprises @ Passerby, New York
- Some Exhaust, Lehmann Maupin Gallery, New York
- Let The Bullshit Run A Marathon, Nicole Klagsbrun Gallery, New York
- Miami Heat, Pacemaker, Gallery Miami, FL

2003

- From Here On, Guild & Greyshkul Gallery, New York
- Circus, 8th Havana Bienal, Havana, Cuba

2002

- Cinco Artistas Jovenes de Diferentes Paises, Galeria Luis Andelatado, Valencia, Spain

2001

- New Orleans Performance Festival, New Orleans
- Strictly Ballroom, Stanford University Museum, Palo Alto, California

2000

- Paladar, 7th Havana Bienal, Cuba

=== Lectures ===
2011 San Francisco Art Institute, CA

=== Museum collections ===
- Los Angeles County Museum of Art
- Museum of Modern Art, New York
- Astrup Fearnley Museum for Moderne Kunst
- JJC Oppenheimer Fund
- Jumex, Mexico City

=== Honors and awards ===
- The Chancey McKeever Award, Walker Art Center, Minneapolis
- The New Genres Award, San Francisco Art Institute

=== Publications ===
- ART: Aaron Young The Rake December 2004
- Dunham, Carla Ruth Aaron Young at Midway Contemporary Art Arts US March–April 2005
- Gardner, James Greater New York The Post March 2005
- Gorgon Irreverent Truths Artnet.com March 2005
- Miles, Christopher Exhibitionism: Greater New York Flaunt No. 63, April 2005
- Kley, Elizabeth Greater New York 2005 Art News May 2005
- Rimanelli, David Greater New York 2005 Artforum May 2005
- Aaron Young at Midway Contemporary Art Contemporary July 2005
- The Renegades W Magazine January 2006, pp. 222–36
- Goldfine, Gil Menace of the Forest The Jerusalem Post. February 17, 2006
- McCormick, Carlo What to Look For in the Whitney Biennial Artnet February 23, 2006
- Rosenberg, Karen Ready to Watch New York Magazine February 27, 2006
- Cotter, Holland Midlife Crisis The New York Times, 23 June 2006
- Searle, Adrian Rebels without a cause The Guardian, September 12, 2006
- Mendehlson, Adam E. Aaron Young: 1% Time Out New York, September 28, 2006
- Cotter, Holland Aaron Young: 1% The New York Times, 6 October 2006
- Honigman, Ani Finel New York Horticulture Artnet, October 2006
- Saltz, Jerry All Art is Contemporary Art Modern Painters, November 2006
- Banai, Nuit Review: Aaron Young Modern Painters, December 2006
- Clintberg, Mark Art Positions: Writing in Sand The Art Newspaper, 7 December 2006
- Robinson, Walter Miami Heat Artnet, December 8, 2006
- Smith, Roberta More Than You Can See: Storm of Art Engulfs Miami The New York Times, 9 December 2006
- Stillman, Nick Review: Aaron Young Artforum, December 2006
- We Brake for the Armory The New York Times, 20 July 2007
- Full Cycle The New Yorker, 13 August 2007
- Tough Guys Don’t Paint Men’s Vogue September 2007
- Vogel, Carol After Test Runs, an Armory Is Ready to Declare, ‘Artists, Start Your Engines’ The New York Times, 17 September 2007
- Smith, Roberta Art in Review: Aaron Young, Greeting Card The New York Times, 21 September 2007
- Bollen, Christopher UES Motocross New York Magazine, 1 October 2007
- Allsop, Laura Substraction Art Review, June 2008
- Aaron Young in “Smoke Flows in All Directions” Caserta News, 21 September 2008
- Mazria-Katz, Marisa Russian Evolution on a Factory Floor Financial Times, 22 September 2008
- Marino, Fuani Aaron Young Corriere della Sera, 23 September 2008
- Renata Caragliano and Stella Cervasio Aaron Young, l’Artista Spericolato La Repubblica, 24 September 2008
- Sutton, Kate Red Planet Artforum.com, 26 September 2008
- Pittura d’Azione, la Poesia in Flussi di Fumo e Giravolte di Calore, Il Roma, 26 September
- Aaron Young al Volcano Solfatara Arte e Critica, September 2008
- Trione, Vincenzo Young, l’Effimero Si Fa Spettacolo Il Mattino, 27 September 2008
- Performances Exibart.pdf, 28 September 2008
- Aaron Young: Smoke Flows in All Directions RAI Regione Campania, 29 September 2008
- Aaron Young: Smoke Flows in All Directions Arte.go, 29 September 2008
- Motociclisti alla Solatara: “Pittura d’Azione” Sotto le Ruote Leggo, 29 September 2008
- Kim, Sebastian Aaron Young Interview, October 2008
- Douglas, Sarah A Bright Flame Art + Auction. October 2008
- Pigozzi Multitasking Vanity Fair (Italia), 1 October 2008
- Resoconto: Aaron Young Exibart.com, 7 October 2008
- Taylor, Alex Thursday Art Crawl: Two Shows Tonight The New York Observer, 13 November 2008
- Vallora, Marco Aaron Young, la Texture dell’Apocalisse Cronache di Liberal, 15 November 2008
- Fabiola Santiago and Jane Wooldridge Slow But Steady Opening for VIPs at Art Basel MiamiHerald.com, 4 December 2008
- Rosenberg, Karen Aaron Young, Punchline The New York Times, 5 December 2008
- Bones Bones’ Beat: Aaron Young at Bortolami Gallery The Village Voice, 11 December 2008
- Obrist, Hans Ulrich Aaron Young: Warhol’s Child Flash Art, January 2009
- Phillips, Owen Aaron Young Flash Art, March 2009
- Hugon, Francois “I Was Surprised It Went So Fast”: Aaron Young Intersection, Spring 2009
- Valloire, Delphine De Bruit et de Fureur. Créateur en Roue Libre Jalouse (Galerie Almine Rech), April 2009
- Schmit, Sophie Expositions Parisiennes: Entrées Libres 30 April 2009
- Céh, Yan Forever Young Blast (Galerie Almine Rech), 20 May 2009
- Wullschlager, Jackie “Abstract America” at Saatchi Gallery Financial Times, 30 May 2009
- Jones, Laura K. Paris Dispatch Artnet.com
- Searle, Adrian Review: The Saatchi’s Art Exhibition Abstract America is Stupid Stuff Turned Out Smart, Guardian.co.uk, 2 June 2009
- Abstract America: New Painting and Sculpture on view at the Saatchi Gallery Artdaily.org, 4 June 2009
- Aaron Young, The Parisian, 17 June 2009
- Hackett, Regina Spite¬-The Art Version ArtsJournal.com19 August 2009
- Daly, Ian Artistic License, Details Magazine, April 2010 ill pg 89-92.
- Mooney, Christopher, Hellraiser, ArtReview, January/February 2010
- Williams, Maxwell, Aaron Young, Assessing Contentment Through The Collaborative Processes, Flaunt Magazine, 2010 ill. Pg 42 -43.
- Il Macro punta sul 7: Da Aaron Young fino a Jacob Hashimoto, Corriere della Sera, April 28, 2010
- Marocco, Terry, Più che un segno, lascerò una sgommata, Panorama, June 3, 2010
- Aaron Young. You can run but you can’t hide, Umbriacity.it, July 12, 2010
- Gaymer, Dann, Aaron Young; Jackson Pollock Meets the Hell’s Angels, Eloquence, July 2010
- A.D.D. Attention Deficit Disorder, Abitare, September 2010
- Perra, Daniele, Aaron Young, Kult, September 2010
- Ng, David, Jefferey Deitch Welcomes You to His Posh L.A. House, Los Angeles Times, October 28, 2010

== See also ==
- Patrick Hill (artist)
- Piotr Janas
- Avner Ben-Gal
- Richard Aldrich (artist)
