= Alexander Roux =

- Born: March 18, 1813; Gap, France
- Died: November 4, 1886 (aged 73); New York City, New York
- Resting place: Green-Wood Cemetery
- Occupation: Cabinetmaker
- Years active: 1836–1880

Alexander Roux (1813–1886) was a French-trained ébéniste, or cabinetmaker, who emigrated to the United States in the 1830s. He opened a shop in New York City in 1836. The business grew quickly: by the 1850s he employed 120 craftsmen in his shop and introduced then-new industrial technologies, such as steam-powered saws.

Roux produced works in the ornate Rococo Revival style influenced by eighteenth-century France. He also worked in the Gothic, Renaissance, and later Neo-Grec styles.

== Selected works ==
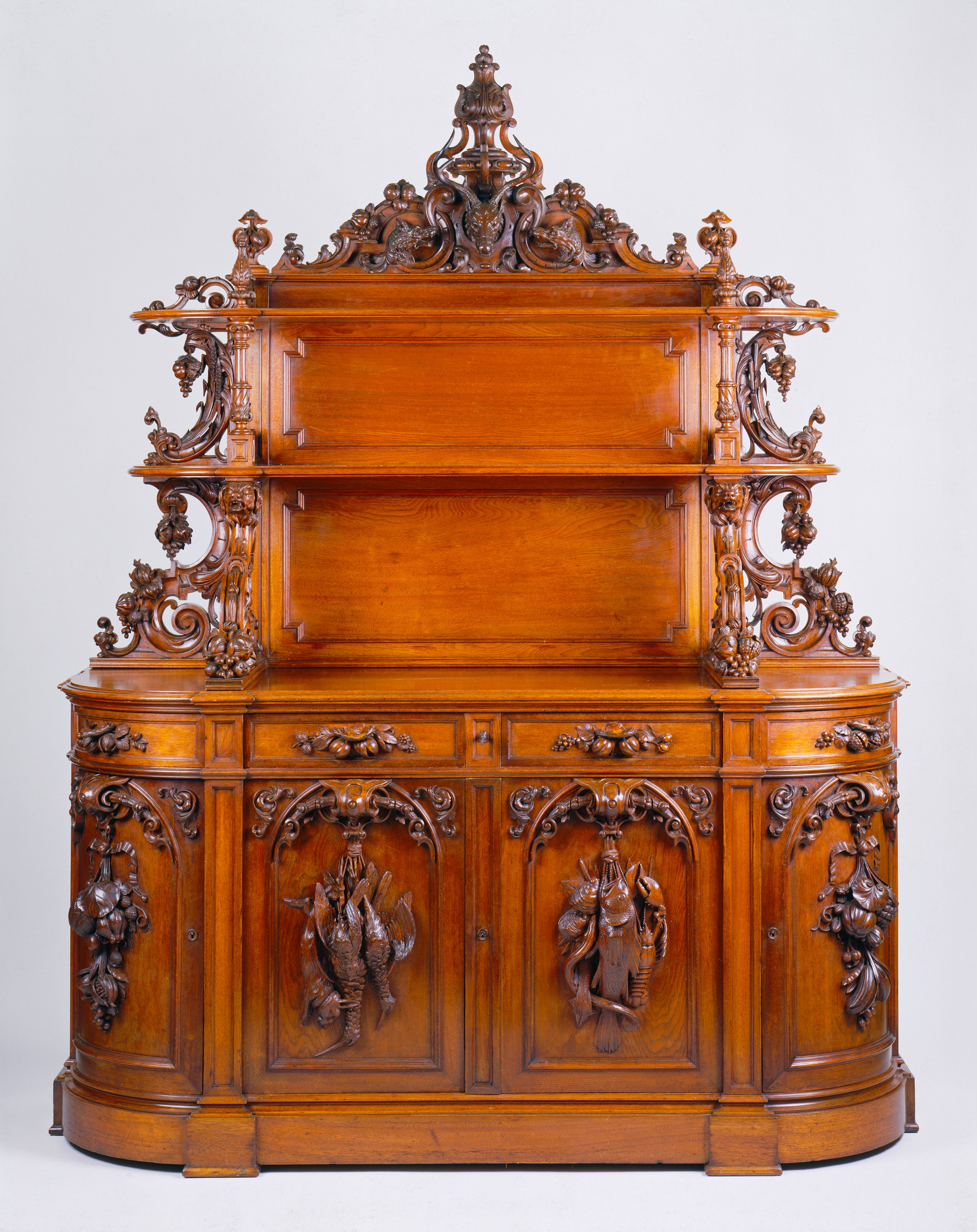
Sideboard (c. 1853), Metropolitan Museum of Art

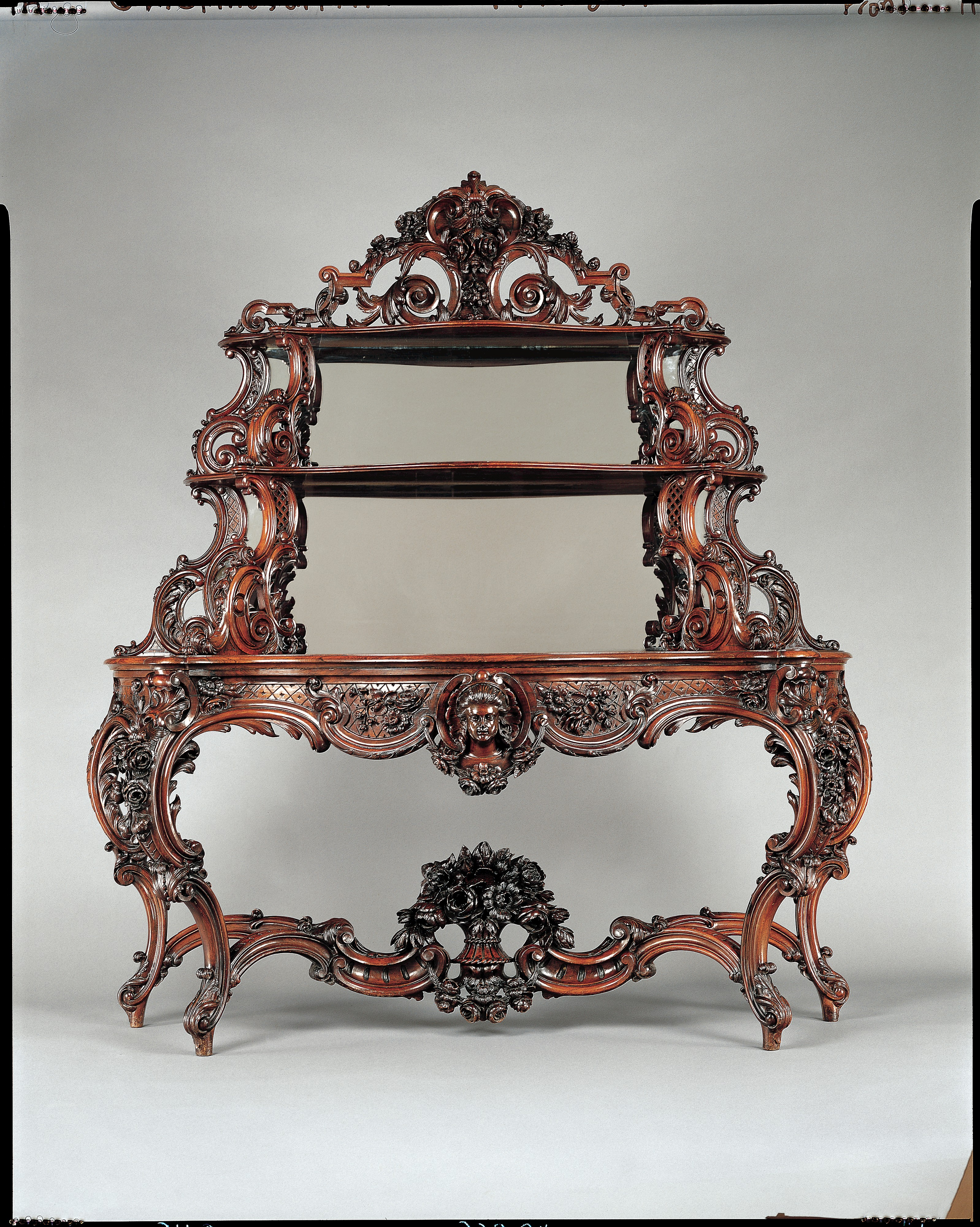
Étagère (c. 1855), Metropolitan Museum of Art

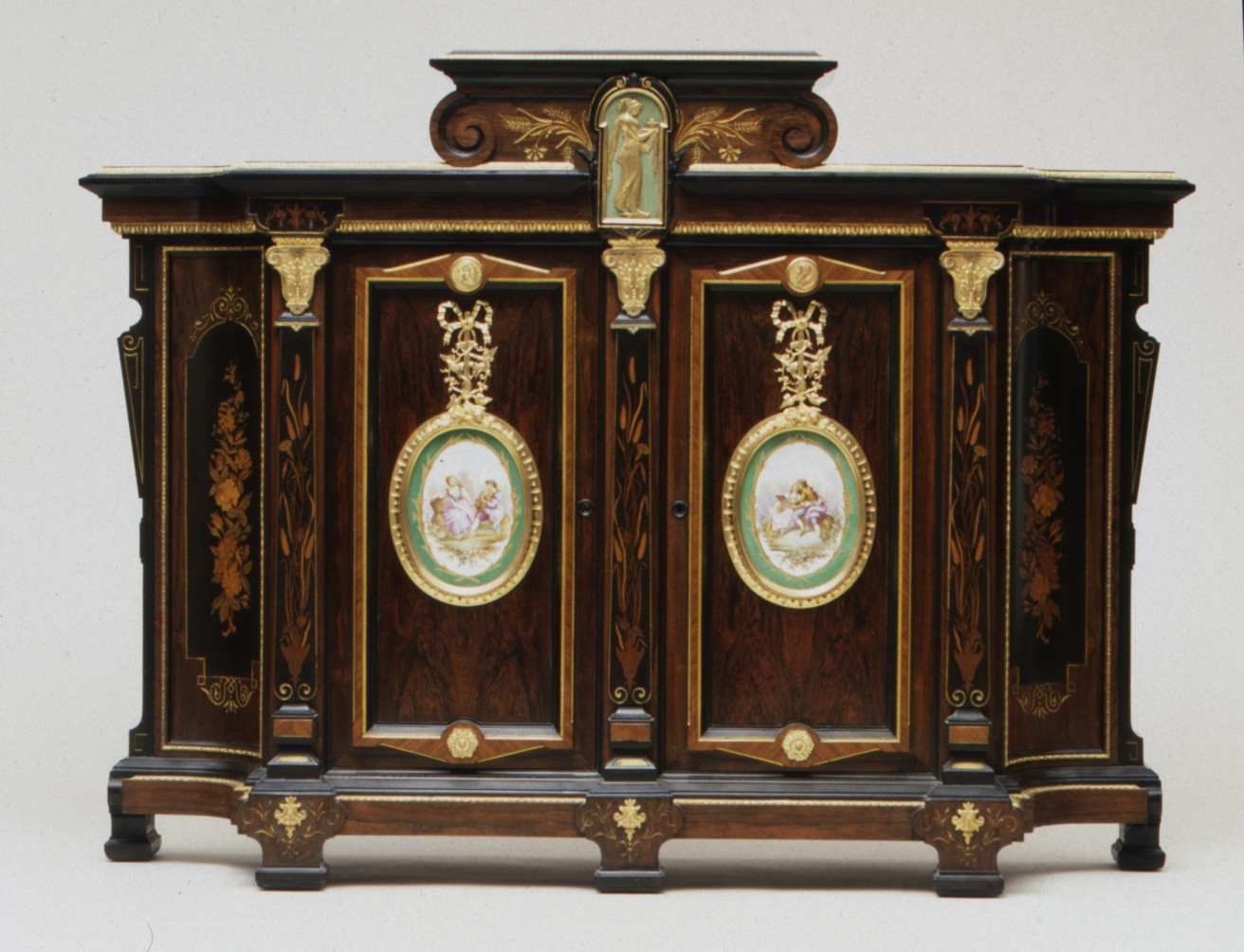
Cabinet (c. 1866), Metropolitan Museum of Art
