= Piotr Janas =

Polish artist

Piotr Janas (born 1970) is a Polish artist. He has had solo gallery exhibitions in Berlin, Warsaw and San Francisco. In 2006, he was included in the group show Infinite Painting: Contemporary Painting and Global Realism, curated by Franceco Bonami at the Villa Manin Centro d’Arte Contemporanea as well as Polish Painting of the 21st Century at the National Gallery of Art in Warsaw and the 50th International Venice Bienniale in 2003. He currently lives and works in Warsaw, Poland.

== Solo exhibitions ==
2010

- Istituto del Cervello, Cardi Black Box, Milan

2009

- Geometry of Meat, Nicolas Krupp, Basel
- Foksal Gallery Foundation, Warsaw

2007

- Bortolami, New York

2005

- Galerie Giti Nourbakhsch, Berlin
- Foksal, Warsaw
- Jack Hanley Gallery, Los Angeles

2004

- Wrong Gallery, New York
- Giti Nourbakhsch Gallery, Berlin

2003

- Foksal Gallery Foundation, Warsaw
- Transmission Gallery, Glasgow

Á

== Selected exhibitions and projects ==
2006

- Polish Painting of the 21st Century Zachnta, National Gallery of Art, Warsaw
- Willa Warszawa, Raster Gallery, Warsaw
- Infinite Painting. Contemporary Painting and Global Realism / Pittura Contemporanea e Realismo
- Globale, Villa Manin Centro d’Arte Contemporanea, Passariano (cat.)

2004

- Flash at War with Enigma, Kunsthalle Basel, Basel (cat.)

2003

- Dreams and Conflicts: The Dictatorship of the Viewer, La Biennale di Venezia, Venice (cat.)

2001

- Zawody malarskie / Painters' Competition, Galeria Bielska BWA, Bielsko-Biala (curated by Adam Szymczyk) (cat.)

1998

- Galeria Rotunda, Warsaw
- November 1998 – November 1999 - "Big Movement" (collaboration with Maciej Sawicki), various locations, Warsaw

2001

- Minus, Galeria Promocyjna, Warsaw (cat.)

1999

- Received the award of EXIT art magazine in the 34th National Painting Contest “Bielska Jesien ’99”
