= Patrick Hill (artist) =

Patrick Hill is an American artist. His abstract sculptures juxtapose hard and soft materials and references to Minimalism and the human body. Common materials are wood, stone, steel, fabric dye and glass. Hill also makes paintings on un-primed canvas with oil paint and various organic pigments.

He participated in the 2008 Whitney Biennial.
