= Leigh Mitchell Hodges =

American poet

- Born: July 9, 1876; Denver, Colorado, US
- Died: April 4, 1954 (aged 77); Wooster, Ohio, US
- Occupation: Writer

Leigh Mitchell Hodges (July 9, 1876 – April 4, 1954) was an American journalist, author, poet, and lecturer. He was the recipient of the 1952 Benjamin Rush Award.

== Life ==
Hodges was born in Denver, Colorado, on July 9, 1876. He attended high school in Carthage, Missouri and went to college at the School of Fine Arts in St. Louis. He worked as a reporter, contributor, and editor for such new organizations as the Missouri Daily Ledger, The Kansas City Star, the Ladies' Home Journal, The New Yorker, Reader's Digest, and The Times of London. Hodges is known for writing a column called The Optimist for The Philadelphia Inquirer, known at the time as Philadelphia North American, and later writing a book of the same name, which was later republished as The Great Optimist and Other Essays. He also wrote several more books, poems, and hymns. He also worked with Emily Bissell to introduce Christmas Seals to raise funds and awareness for lung diseases such as tuberculosis.

== Works ==
- The Great Optimist and Other Essays (1903)
- In the Beauty of the Lilies (1904)
- The Worth of Service (1904)
- Poems We Love (1907)
- Golden book of the Wanamaker stores. Jubilee year, 1861-1911 (1911)
- The Great Encouragement, and Other Helpful Essays (1913)
- Bird Guardians; a Masque for Bird Protection (1915)
- The Bard at Home (1916)
