= Christmas Seal & Charity Stamp Society =

Non-profit philatelic organization

The Christmas Seal & Charity Stamp Society is a non-profit philatelic organization devoted to collecting Christmas seals, charity labels, fundraising seals, charity stamps and semi-postal postage stamps where part of the cost of the stamp goes to charity. The society was founded in 1931 by W.L. Kinkead, a stamp collector and president of the New Jersey Tuberculosis League.

== Organization ==
Numbering over 350 members worldwide, the CS&CSS is a non profit organization with an elected board, president, and secretary/ treasurer; all positions are unpaid volunteers. The society is affiliated to the American Philatelic Society.

== Catalogs ==
The CS&CSS began publishing catalogs for collectors in 1936 when pioneer member, Dick Green wrote Green's Catalog, which remains the Bible of United States, and worldwide Christmas Seal collecting. Another early author of CS&CSS literature was Ray Mosbaugh who wrote catalogs of worldwide red cross seals, and US fundraising seals issued for causes other than tuberculosis, known as the All Fund Catalog. This Catalog is divided into 10 sections which catalog hundreds of fundraising seal issuing societies such as, Easter Seals (U.S.), Boys Town (organization) listed in the Catholic section, National Wildlife Federation, listed in the Pets, Plants, and Wildlife section, and National Association for the Advancement of Colored People listed in the ethnic section.

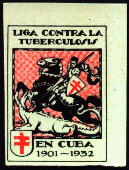

== Activities ==
Formed to promote and improve the hobby of Christmas Seal collecting; Members are encouraged to write and edit specialized catalogs. CS&CSS members exhibit their collections which include all fundraising, event seals, and Cinderella Stamps, at stamp shows or Philatelic exhibitions. In 2009 the CS&CSS established the Emily Bissell Award for best competitive Christmas Seal exhibit. Members meet at national and international stamp shows where their hobby and publications are on display and educational material is distributed from society booths. Articles and information are shared through their award-winning quarterly journal, Seal News, which includes a society auction where members can buy and sell duplicates from their collection.
