= Christmas seal =

Labels (not stamps) placed on mail during Christmas

Christmas Seals

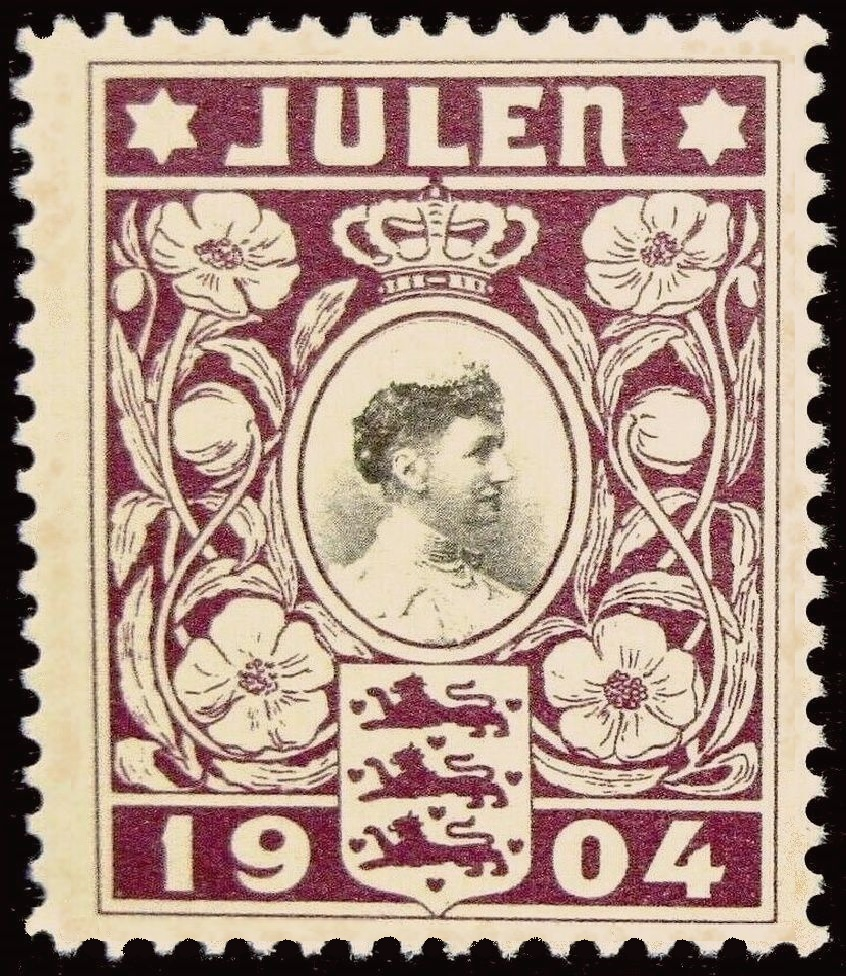
The world's first Christmas seal.
Issued in Denmark, 1904, features the Danish Queen Louise (Note: "Julen" is Danish for 'Christmas'.)

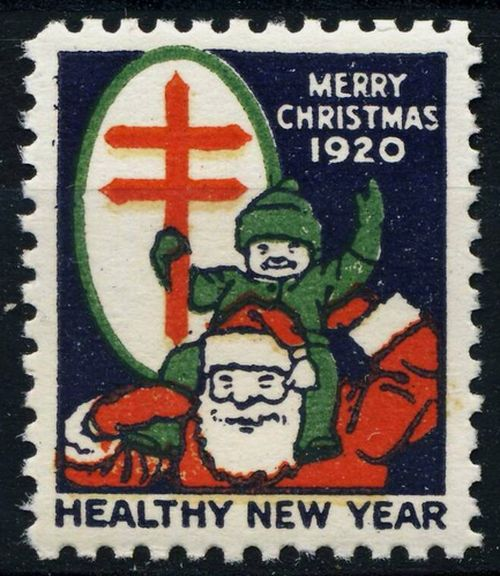
The first Christmas seal with red double-barred cross, symbol of the National Tuberculosis Association, 1920 issue

Christmas seals are adhesive labels that are similar in appearance to postage stamps that are sold then affixed to mail during the Christmas season to raise funds and awareness for charitable programs. Christmas seals have become particularly associated with lung diseases such as tuberculosis, and with child welfare in general. They were first issued in Denmark beginning in 1904, with Sweden and Iceland following with issues that same year. Thereafter the use of Christmas seals proved to be popular and spread quickly around the world, with 130 countries producing their own issues.

Christmas Seals were sometimes mistaken for Christmas stamps used for postage, prompting the US Post Office to adopt a policy requiring seals to be affixed on the reverse side of a postcard or envelope, but the policy was generally unfavorable and often ignored, ultimately resulting in its withdrawal. Christmas seals exist in several varieties, most notably those first issued by the Red Cross and later by the National Tuberculosis Association (Note: Now known as the American Lung Association) with its red double barred cross on the face of the seal.

Other charitable seals have been issued by state governments, religions and social organizations worldwide. Governments have issued semi-postal postage stamps to raise funds for the Red Cross or other charitable causes. (Note: A semi-postal stamp bears two denominations, with one denomination paying postage and one going towards a charitable cause.) From the onset Christmas seals received much public acclaim and were soon sought after by collectors and postal historians. Today, as a collectable item, their monetary worth varies considerably.

== Danish origin ==
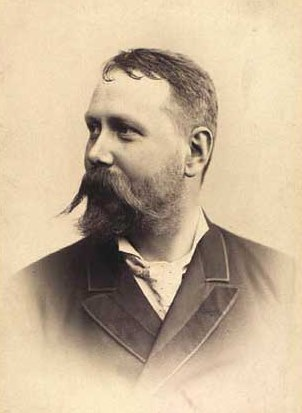
Einar Holbøll, c. 1900

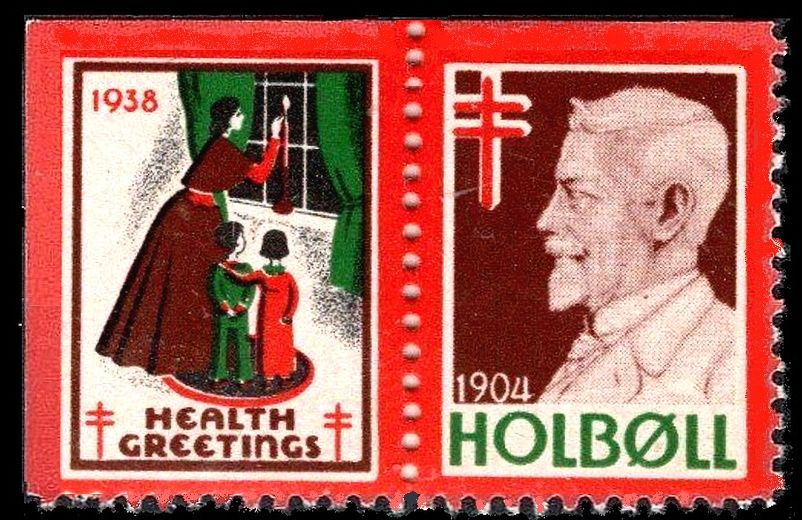
In 1938 Holbøll was featured on a U.S. Christmas seal

At the beginning of the 1900s tuberculosis was a greatly feared disease, and its harmful effects on children seemed particularly devastating. In 1904, Einar Holbøll, a Danish postal clerk, developed the idea of adding an extra charitable stamp on mailed holiday greetings during Christmas. The money raised would be used to help children sick with tuberculosis. The plan was approved by the Postmaster and the King of Denmark (Christian IX). Prior to his death in 1927 Holboell was knighted by the king of Denmark for his contributions in the effort to fight tuberculosis and for associating Christmas with the need to help those afflicted with the disease. He was also honored by a number of other countries, including the United States, for his efforts.

In 1904, the world's first Christmas seal was issued in Denmark, bearing the likeness of the Danish Queen (Louise of Hesse-Kassel) and the word Julen (Christmas). Over 4 million were sold in the first year at DKK 0.02 per seal, raising more than $18,000, which in 1904 was a considerable sum of money. The following year the sale of Christmas Seals brought even more money to the fight against tuberculosis.

During the first six years, enough funds were raised to build the Christmas Seal Sanatorium in Kolding, which opened in 1911. The same year the sanatorium was transferred to the administration of the Danish National Association to Combat Tuberculosis as it was considered a waste of resources to have two organizations working towards the same purpose. Fundraising would successfully continue via Christmas Seals for years to come.

The Danish Christmas Seal Committee, today known as Julemærkefonden (the Christmas Seal Fund), decided at that time to put all future collected funds to use in building and operating convalescent homes for children.

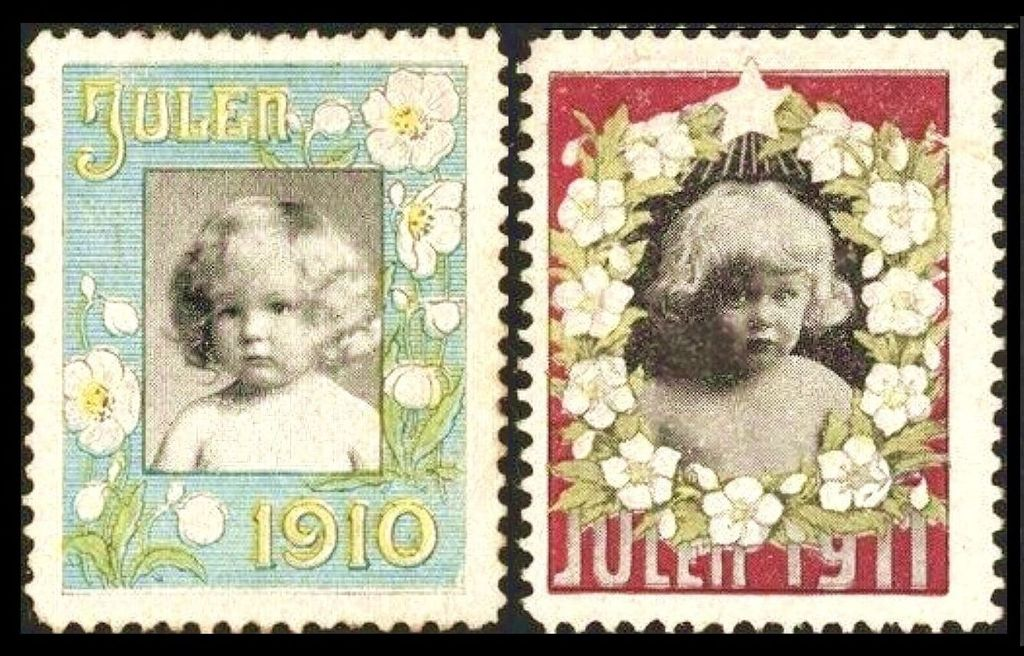
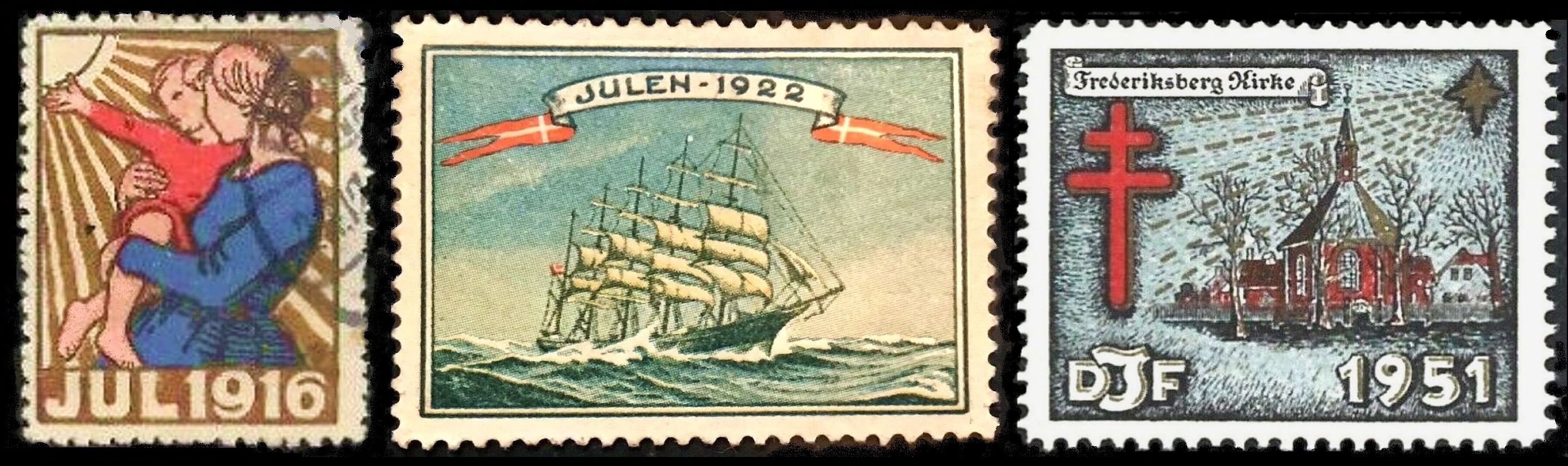
A selection of Danish Christmas seals, 1910, 1911, 1916, 1922, 1951 issues

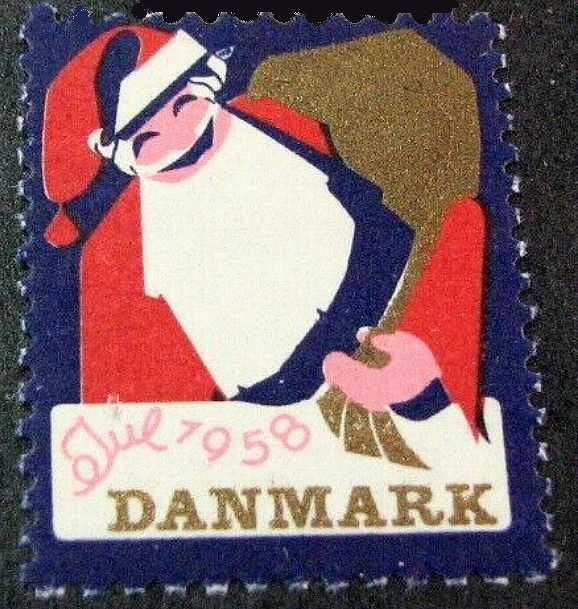
Controversial seal of Denmark, 1958

In 1958 a controversy over the appearance of Santa Claus on a Danish Christmas seal started when Rev. Paul Nedergad, a Copenhagen clergyman, referred to Santa Claus as a "pagan goblin". He insisted that people should find another way to help the charitable cause to fight tuberculosis and boycott the Christmas seal in question. Most of the people of Denmark paid little attention to Negerdard's comment and continued to buy the Christmas seals that depicted Santa Claus.

== United States ==
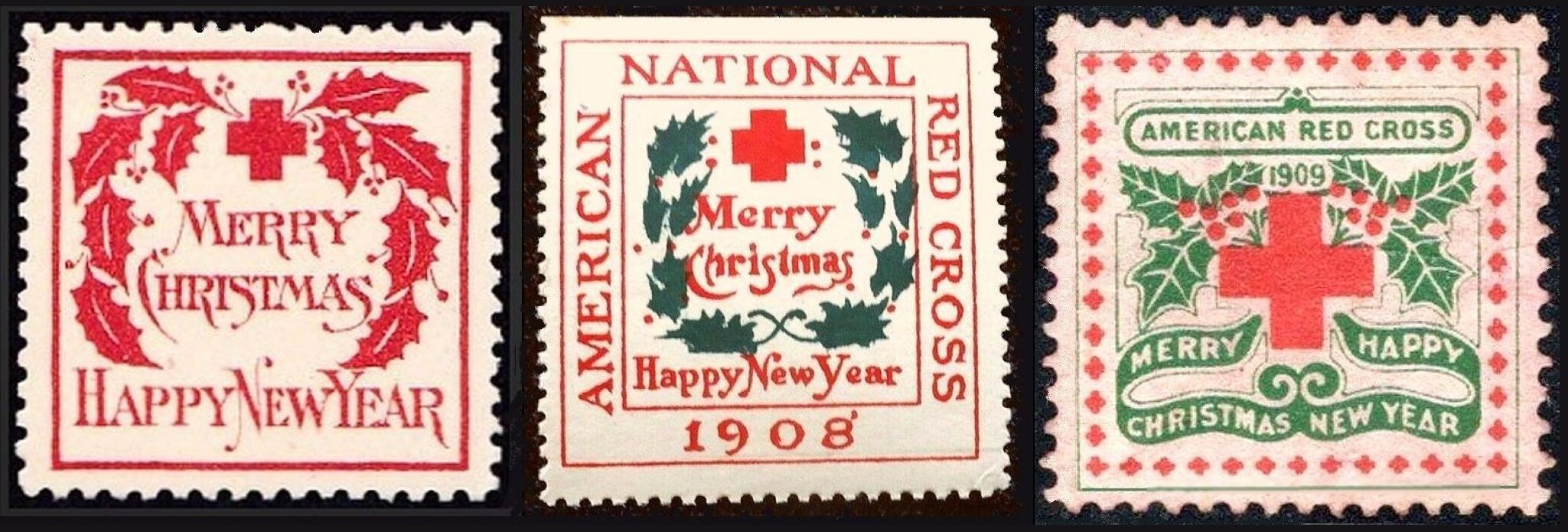
The first U.S. Christmas seals, of 1907, 1908 and 1909.

At the beginning of the 20th century the United States was also experiencing a tuberculosis outbreak of epidemic proportions. At the time, the only practical way to treat the disease was confining those afflicted in a sanatorium. Most of these facilities were in dire need of funding and were faced with closure.

One such facility was located in Brandywine, Delaware, and almost at the point of its termination, where a doctor, Joseph Wales, remembered his cousin Emily Bissell who was experienced in fundraising efforts. He sent her a letter relating the situation his sanatorium was facing. Bissell was touched by his letter and sent out looking for ways to raise the $300 needed for her cousin's sanatorium to remain open.

The great success of Christmas seals in Europe prompted Danish-born Jacob Riis, a muckraking journalist, photographer and a friend of Theodore Roosevelt, to write an editorial advocating their sale in America. The editorial and the great success Christmas Seals brought to charitable efforts in Europe in 1904 was a great source of inspiration to Emily Bissell who pursued the prospect in the United States and organized the production and sale of Christmas seals in America.

Bissell likewise hoped to raise money for her cousin's sanatorium on the Brandywine Creek in Delaware. In 1907, Bissell designed a Delaware local Christmas seal, the first to be issued in the United States. Christmas seals generated $3,000 in the first year. By 1909 sales generated $250,000. It became clear to the Red Cross sales of Christmas seals should continue as an independent enterprise. The Director of the American Red Cross, Ernest P. Bicknell, was a member of the Board of Directors of the National Tuberculosis Association, now in its sixth year of operation.

In the summer of 1910, Bicknell and Dr. Livingston Farrand, a member of the faculty of Columbia University, arranged a partnership in the sale of Christmas Seals with the Red Cross, which lasted until 1920, when the Red Cross turned over the entire Christmas seal operation to the National Tuberculosis Association. In the succeeding years sales grew continuously, from three thousand dollars in 1907 to 26 million dollars by 1955.

Initially printed by the Lithograph process, the seals were sold in post office lobbies across the United States. The first U.S. Christmas seal of 1907 was initially sold on December 7, 1907 in Wilmington, Delaware by the Delaware Chapter of the American Red Cross, at a penny each. By 1908, Bissell's idea grew to a national program administered by the National Association for the Study and Prevention of Tuberculosis (NASPT) Christmas seals issued from 1908 to 1918 were issued nationally by the American National Red Cross. Net proceeds from the sales would be divided equally between the two organizations. Beginning in 1919 when the National Tuberculosis Association assumed operations of Christmas seal production all seals bore the red double-barred cross in the designs.

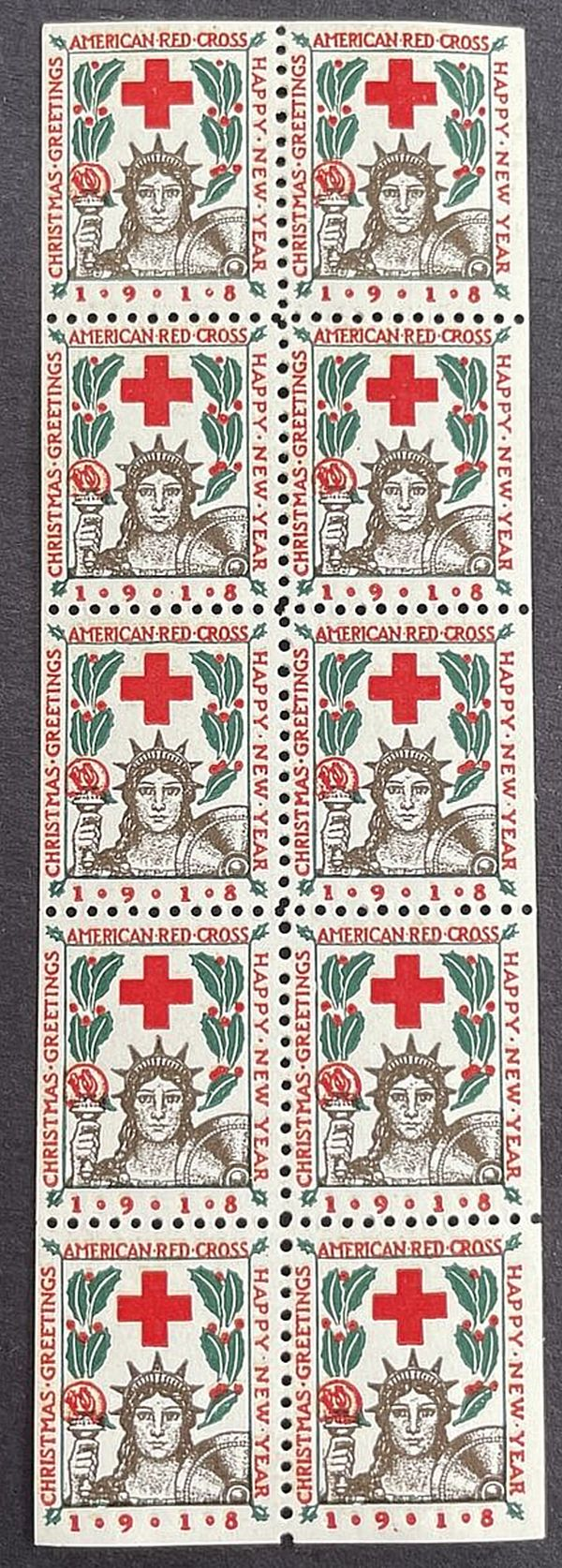
Booklet pane of 1918 issue Christmas seals

The Christmas seals issued in 1918 have an unusual history apart from all the others, in that they were not sold to the general public that year. Issued during World War I they were only given to members of the American Red Cross so as not to compete with other fund-raising drives for the war effort. Issued only in booklet panes of ten, there are no known sheets of 100 of this issue.

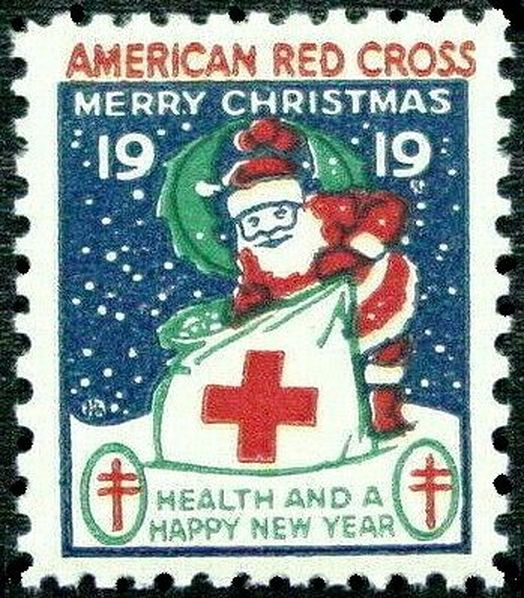
The Christmas seal of 1919 is the last issue to display the Red Cross, and is the only one to display both the Red Cross and the double-bar cross of the National Tuberculosis Association

By 1920, the Red Cross withdrew from the arrangement and sales were conducted exclusively by the NASPT, then known as the National Tuberculosis Association (NTA). Issues from 1920 to 1937; by the National Tuberculosis and Respiratory Disease Association (NTDRA); from 1968 to 1972 and the American Lung Association from 1973 to the present The NTRDA became the American Lung Association in 1973, though the 1974 seals and those issued thereafter continue to show the NTRDA inscription on the sheet margin.

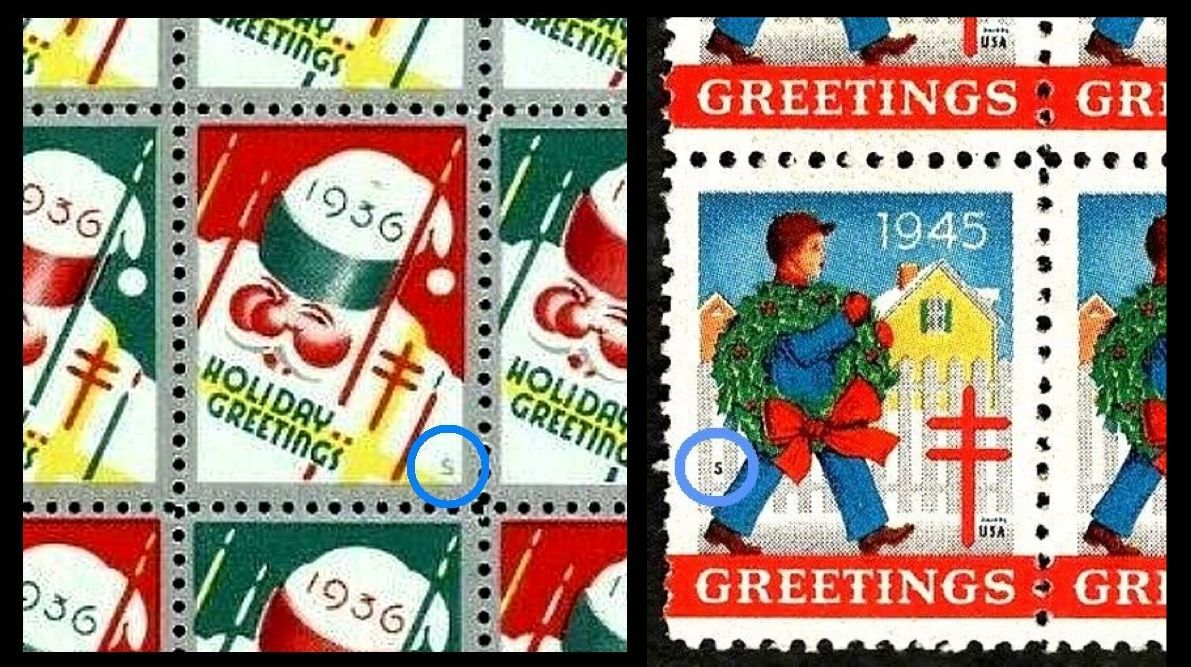
Christmas Seals with printer's marks, circled in blue

Oftentimes two or more different printers were employed to produce a given Christmas seal, producing a seal that was identical to the other such printings. To distinguish between the various printings the Christmas Seal Society deemed it appropriate that each printer add his own printer's mark to one of the seals in a sheet of 100, usually in the middle of the sheet. Printer's marks usually consisted of a small letter within the design of the seal. The addition of printer's marks was initiated in 1926 and continued until 1997.

Local Christmas seals also began to emerge during this time and have existed alongside national issues in the US since 1907, and are also catalogued by the Christmas Seal & Charity Stamp Society.

The first real-life people were not featured on U.S. Christmas seals until the 1938 seals were issued. They featured notables in the fight against tuberculosis, including Einar Holbøll, Robert Koch, René Laennec and Edward Livingston Trudeau.

With the exception of the 1907 and 1908 issues, US Christmas seals were issued in sheets of 100 up until 1975, thereafter being issued in sheets of 54. Beginning in 1935 US Christmas seals were being printed in se-tenant, where there was more than one design of Christmas seals on a single sheet of one hundred Christmas seals. Beginning in 1970 sheets of Christmas seals sometimes each had an individual seal with its own design or depicted an overall scene, with each seal having a portion of that scene, similar to the way that puzzle pieces together displayed a scene or picture.

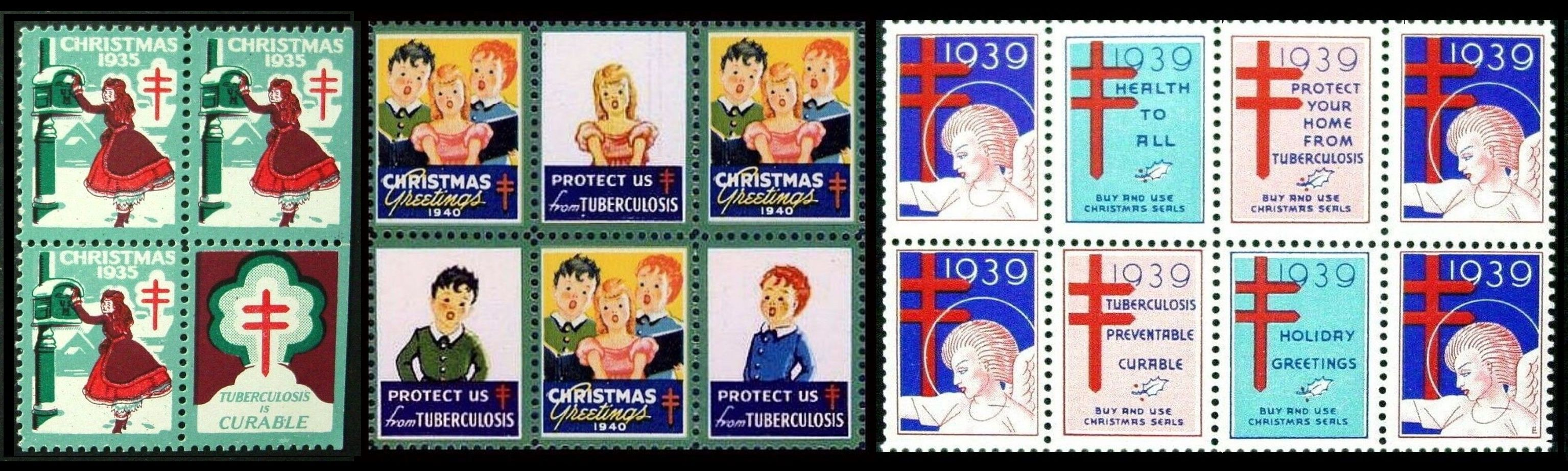
:US Christmas seals in se-tenant form

Various promotional schemes were tried: in 1954 the small town of Saranac Lake, New York (home of the Adirondack Cottage Sanitarium) won a nationwide competition selling Christmas seals, the reward for which was hosting the world premiere of the Paul Newman film The Silver Chalice; the cast participated in a parade in the town's annual winter carnival. Other ideas were employed in the effort to promote Christmas seals, including postmark/cancellations and various forms of advertising, shown in the examples below.

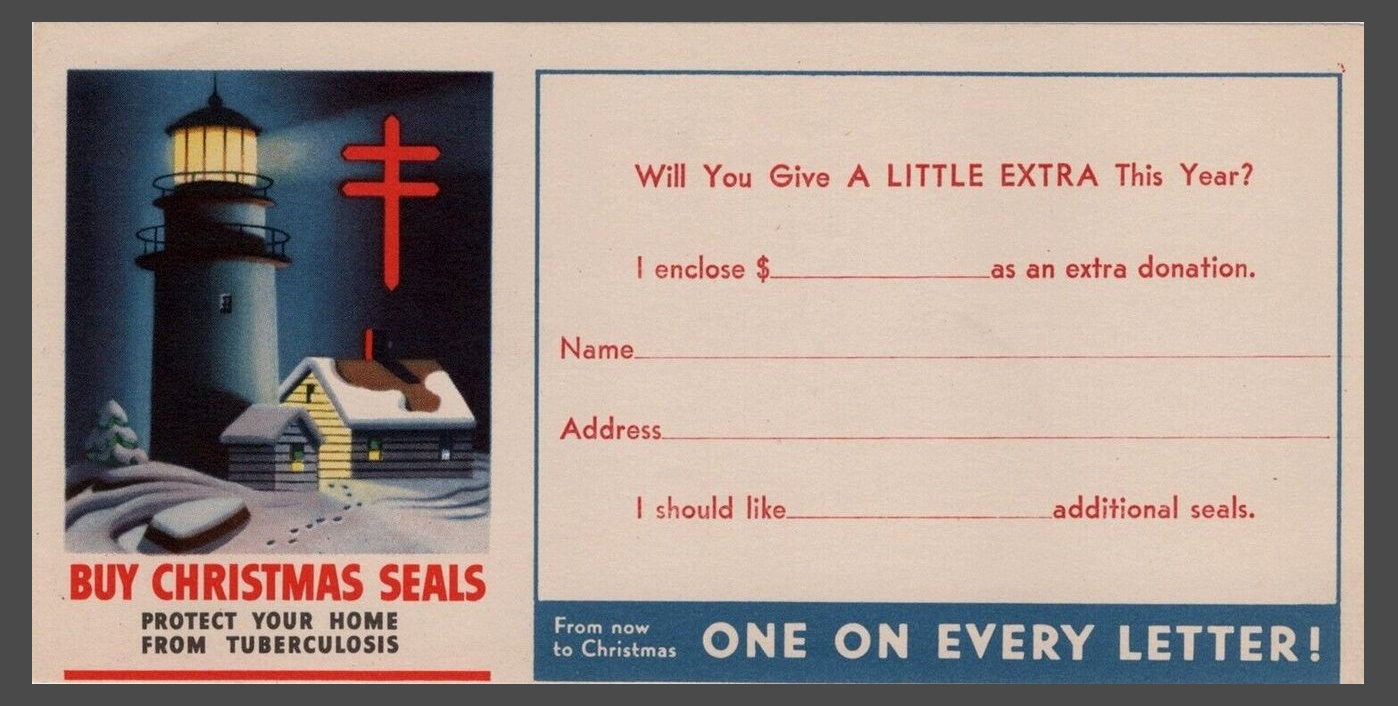
A Christmas seal promotional post card, featuring an image of a 1941 Christmas seal

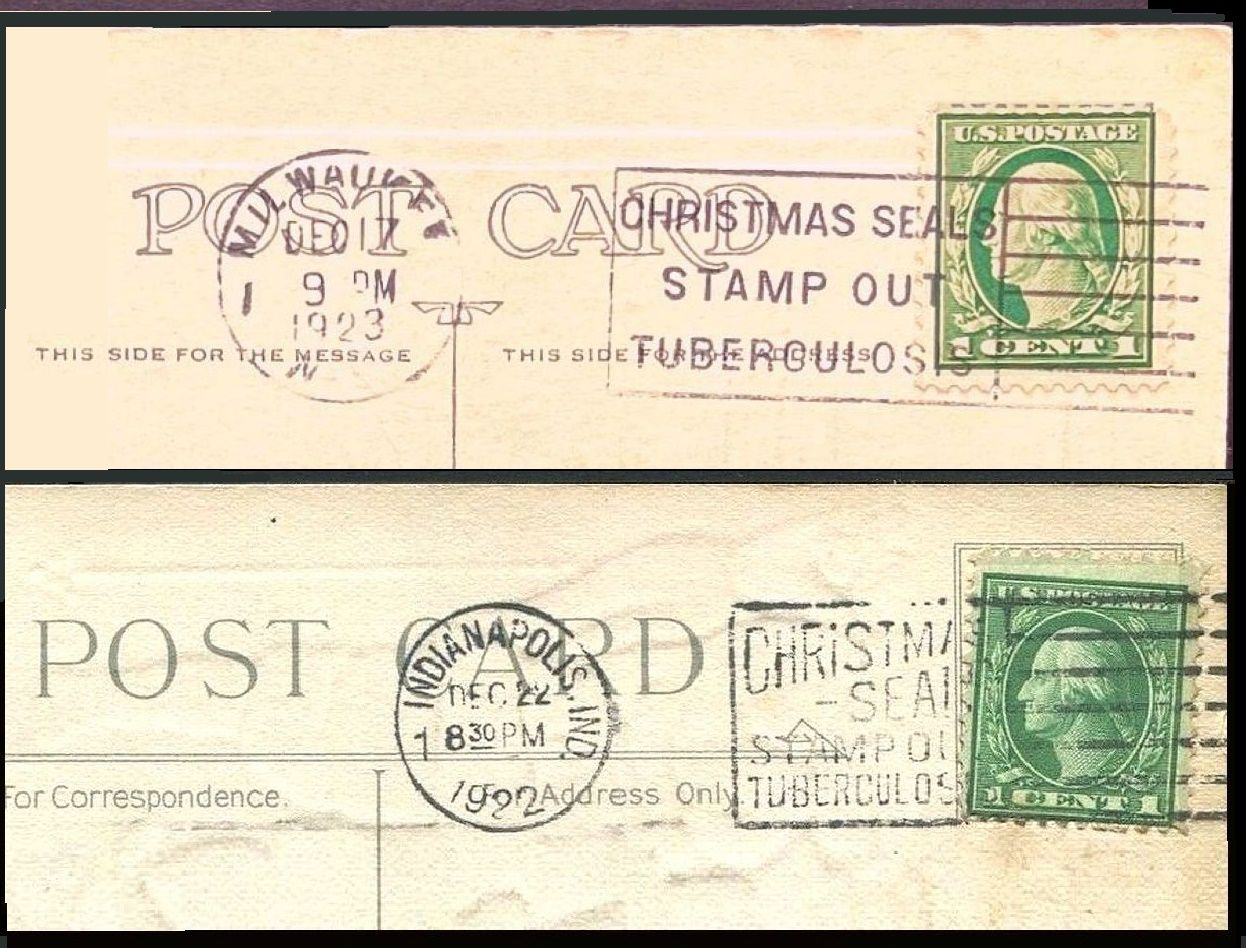
Various post offices used cancellations promoting Christmas seals

Aside from Christmas seals issued nationally by the Red Cross and the National Tuberculosis Association, various states issued seals of their own. Beginning in 1927 the National Association for the Advancement of Colored People, or NAACP, began issuing their own seals to bring awareness to the prejudice and other issues that affected African Americans.

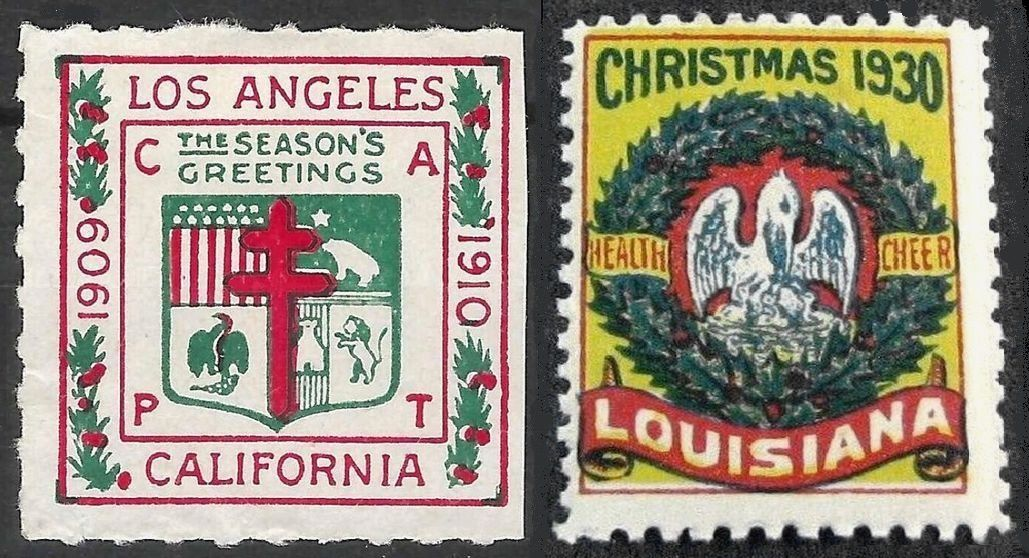
Several states issued their own Christmas seals, Louisiana seals being the longest lived issues

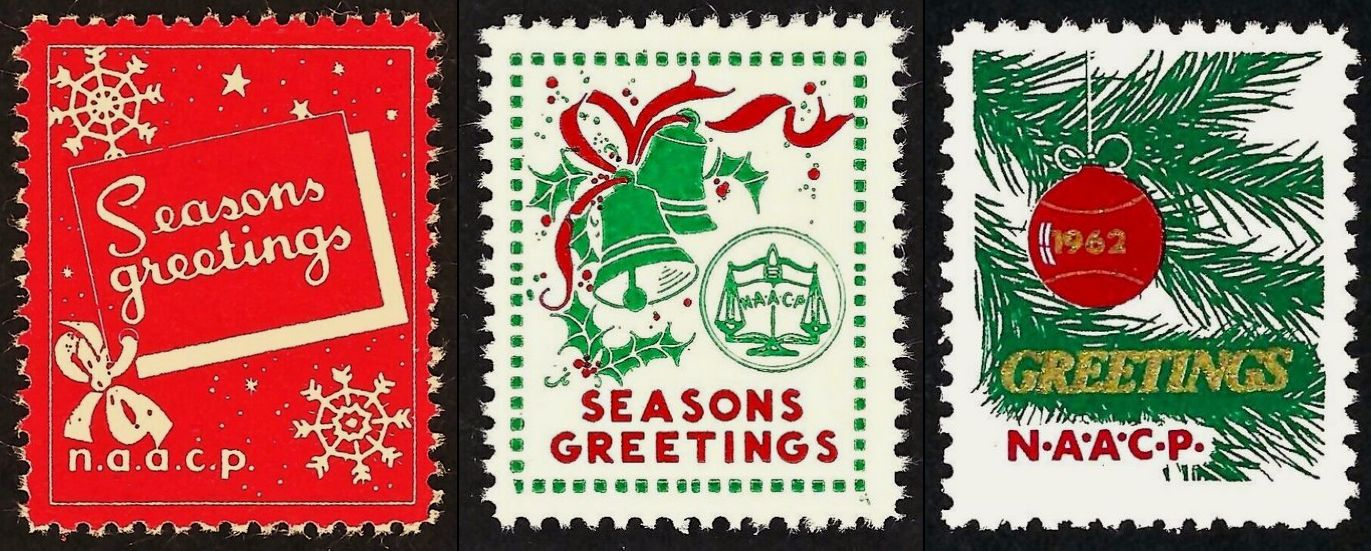
A selection of seals issued by the NAACP From left to right: Issues of 1943, 1945, 1962

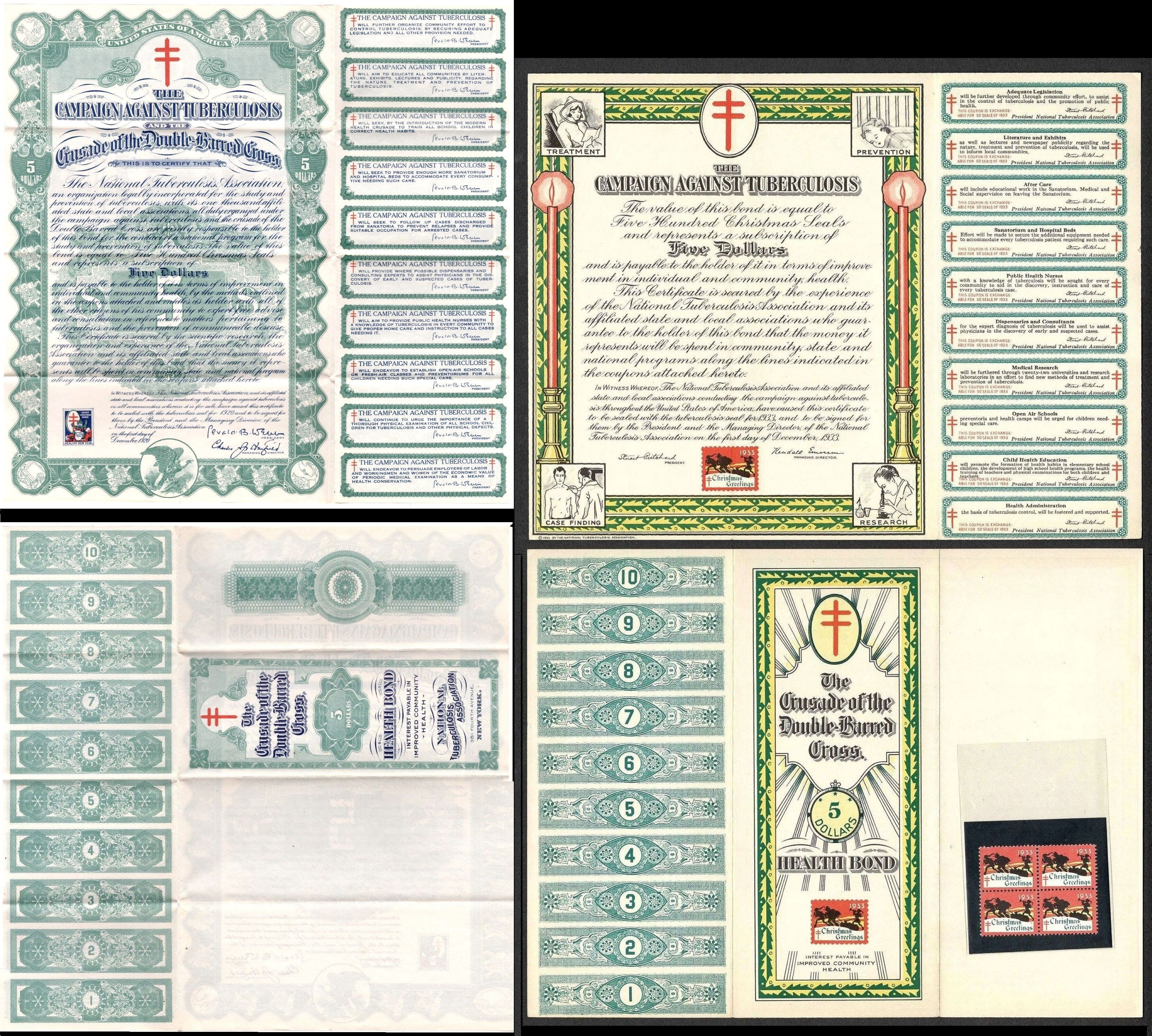
A selection of Christmas seal bonds, 1920 & 1933, with respective Christmas seals for each year attached (reverse view is displayed in the lower images)

Beginning in 1919 the sale of Christmas seals were sold in a form of a bond in order to accommodate big contributors to the fight against tuberculosis. The range of denominations of the bonds ranged from $5 up to $1000. Variations and changes in the design changed from year to year.

Today the Christmas seals benefit the American Lung Association and other lung related issues. Tuberculosis was declining, but recently has been on the rise. Tuberculosis is still one of the most common major infectious diseases in the world. In 1987, the American Lung Association acquired a trademark for the term "Christmas Seals" to protect their right to be the sole US national fundraising Association to issue them. This trademark would not apply to Christmas seals issued outside the US or local and regional Christmas seals, used in the US by many organizations since 1907 when the Kensington Dispensary in Philadelphia, Pennsylvania, issued their own local Christmas seal.

== Canada ==
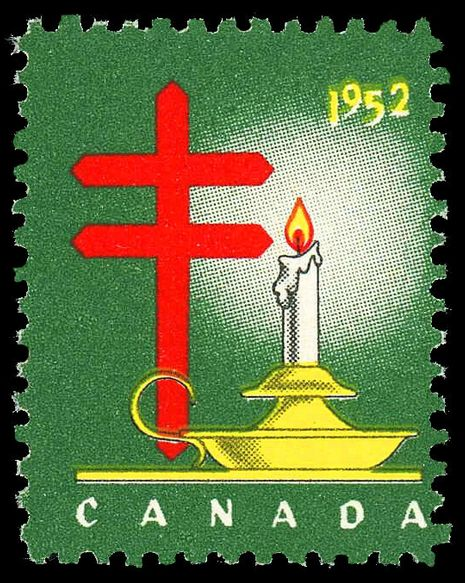
A Canadian Christmas Seal of 1952 (Note: This Canadian Christmas seal, along with several other types, are identical to those issued for the United States, except for the name of country on the seal.)

By 1908, the campaign had reached Canada. Interested people in Toronto and Hamilton, Ontario began Christmas seal campaigns to build and support sanatoriiums, as tuberculosis hospitals were then called. The Toronto Globe came promptly to their aid. Early in December, the Globe began running a daily story on the front page giving news of the campaign. The column was bordered by holly so that readers could easily spot it. One story told how the children of 58 Toronto schools had sold 10,000 Christmas seals. Another issue announced that out in Regina, Saskatchewan another paper, the Regina Leader, had written to say its staff would sell the seals and send the money back for the sanatorium being built in Muskoka.

From Saint John, New Brunswick, the Rev. G. A. Moore wrote to say that he and other volunteers would sell 8,500 and send the money to Toronto for its sanatorium. That first year, the Toronto campaign brought in $7,358.65, the equivalent of almost $200,000 today. Hamilton citizens gave $1,244.40. Year by year, other cities across Canada tried the Christmas seal campaign as a means not only of raising money but of creating the awareness that tuberculosis could be controlled.

In 1927, it was agreed that the Christmas seal campaign was to be the official method for tuberculosis associations to appeal to the public for funds. A national seal was established. Christmas seal campaigns have played an important role in public health. At first, the money raised was used for the new and badly needed sanatorium. When these were established, Christmas seal funds were used for tuberculosis prevention. The seals have paid for millions of Canadians to have chest X-ray or tuberculin tests. As a result, thousands of tuberculosis cases were discovered before disease spread to others. The Canadian Lung Association's Christmas seals continue to symbolize the grassroots support of Canadians that helped win the fight against tuberculosis.

== Europe ==
Soon after Denmark issued the first Christmas seal, Sweden and Iceland followed. Seals then spread throughout Scandinavia and every major country in Europe, and are still popular today. Christmas seals have been issued by hundreds of different societies, nationally, and locally in Asia, Africa, North and South America, and Australia. The majority of all tuberculosis seals since then were issued at Christmas time and included the international symbol against tuberculosis, the double barred Cross of Lorraine.

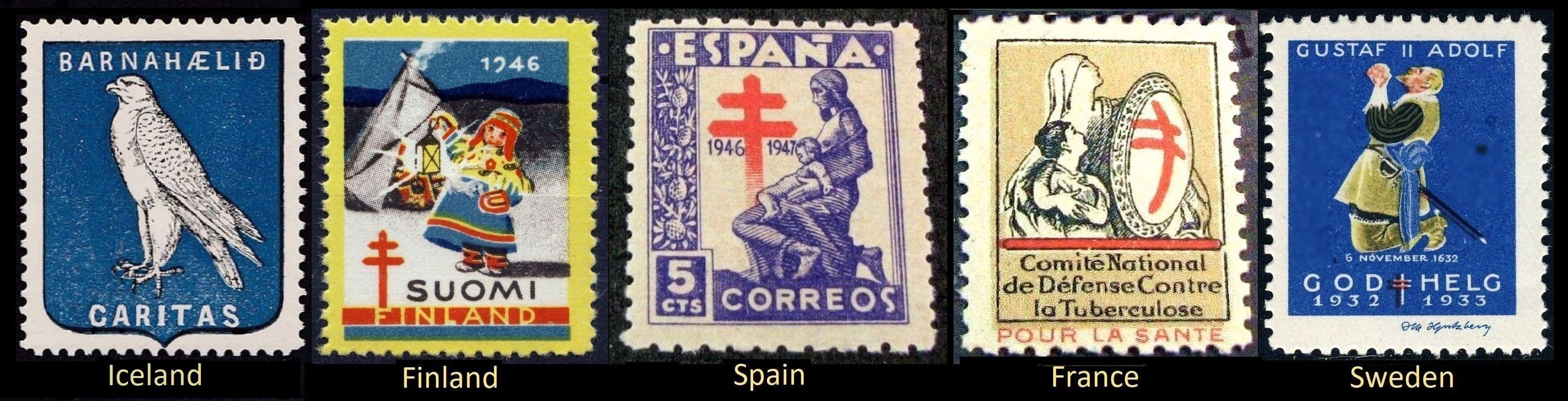
A selection of European Christmas Seals

=== Semi-postals ===
Various governments from around the world have also issued semi-postal postage stamps to help raise funds for the Red Cross and for the fight against tuberculosis, with countries like France, Spain and Belgium having produced hundreds. Beginning in the First World War France issued semi-postal stamps to raise funds for Red Cross who were overwhelmed by the many thousands of people who were wounded during the war. Eventually the French colonies were also producing semi-postals. The idea of semi-postals helping fund the Red Cross soon spread among the countries that were affected by the war, with more than 230 different semi-postals issued by 47 countries. Spain and its colonies rivaled those of France with approximately 150 semi-postals issued.

France began issuing semi-postals to raise funds for the Red Cross in 1918, all of which bear the red cross symbol.

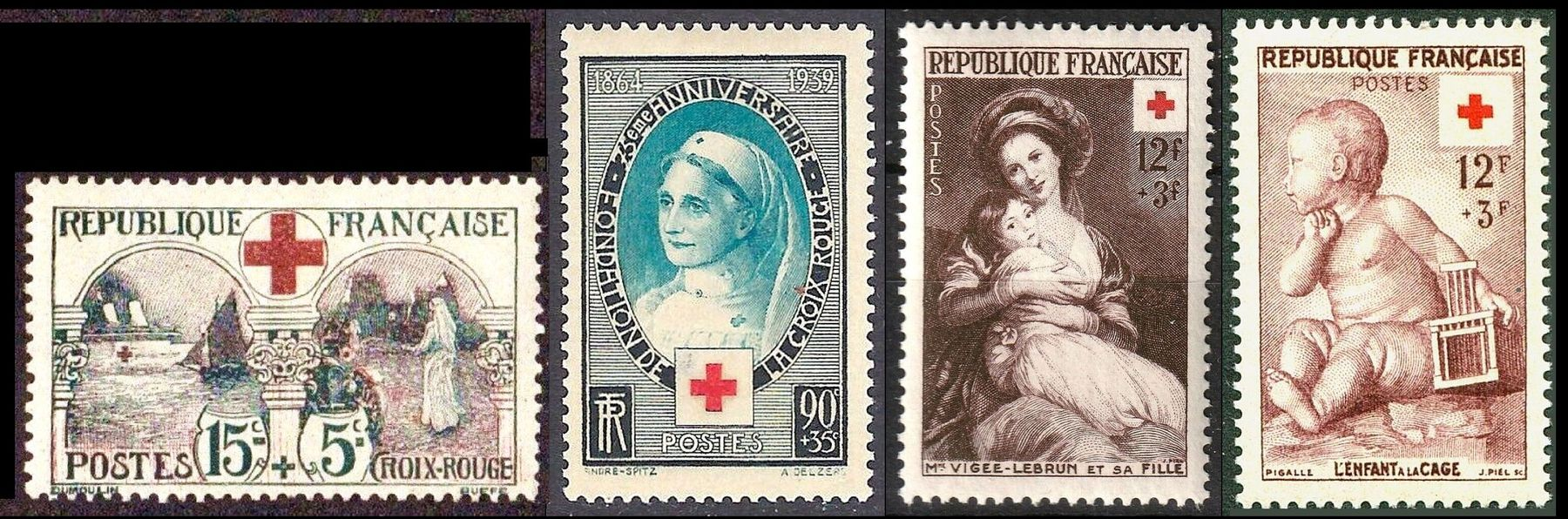
A selection of French semi-postal Red Cross semi-postal stamps From left to right: Issues of 1918, 1939, 1953, 1955

Belgium issued charity stamps in the form of semi-postals, with the denomination on the right going to a charitable cause. The first such issues were released in 1914.

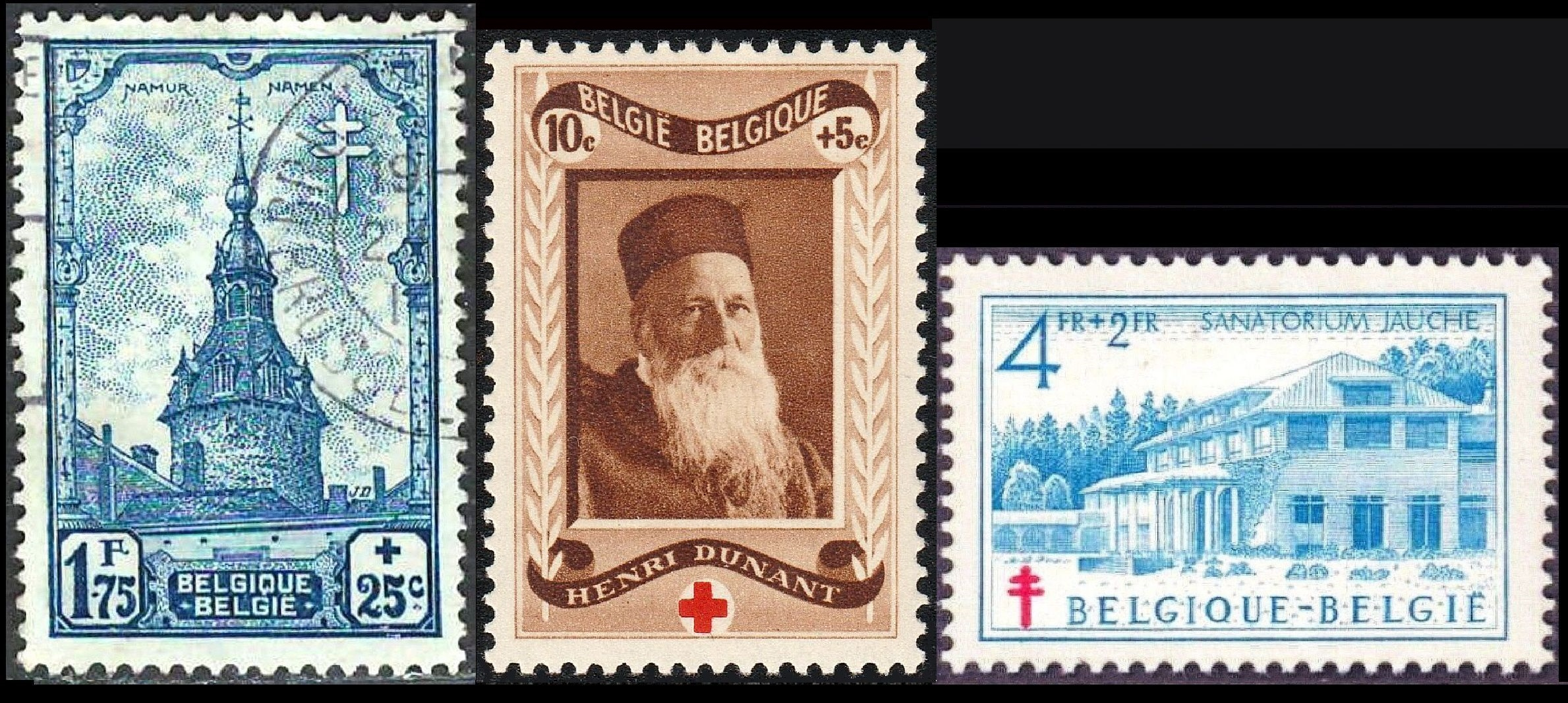
A selection of Belgian semi-postal stamps. 1931-1950 issues.

The other European countries that have issued semi-postal stamps for the Red Cross and various tuberculosis foundations include Belgium, Finland, Germany, Italy and the Netherlands, among others.

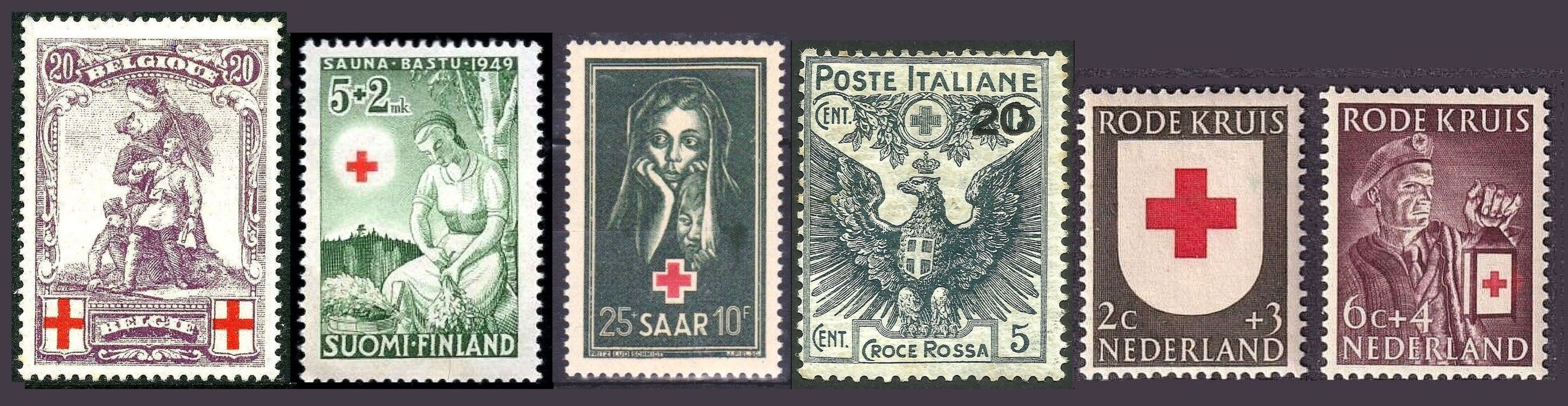
A selection of European Red Cross semi-postal issues From left to right: Belgium, Finland, Germany, Italy, the Netherlands

== Other countries ==
Nearly one hundred different lung associations worldwide issue Christmas seals. Many different countries issue their own Christmas seals, as well as cities, states and territories. Green's Catalog, considered by many collectors as the bible of US and worldwide tuberculosis Christmas seal collecting would distinguish them as national versus local Christmas seals. Many tuberculosis seal issuing societies are members of the International Union against Tuberculosis and Lung Disease, which holds a Christmas seal contest for best design among their Organizational and Constituent seal issuing members at their annual World Conference on Lung Health.

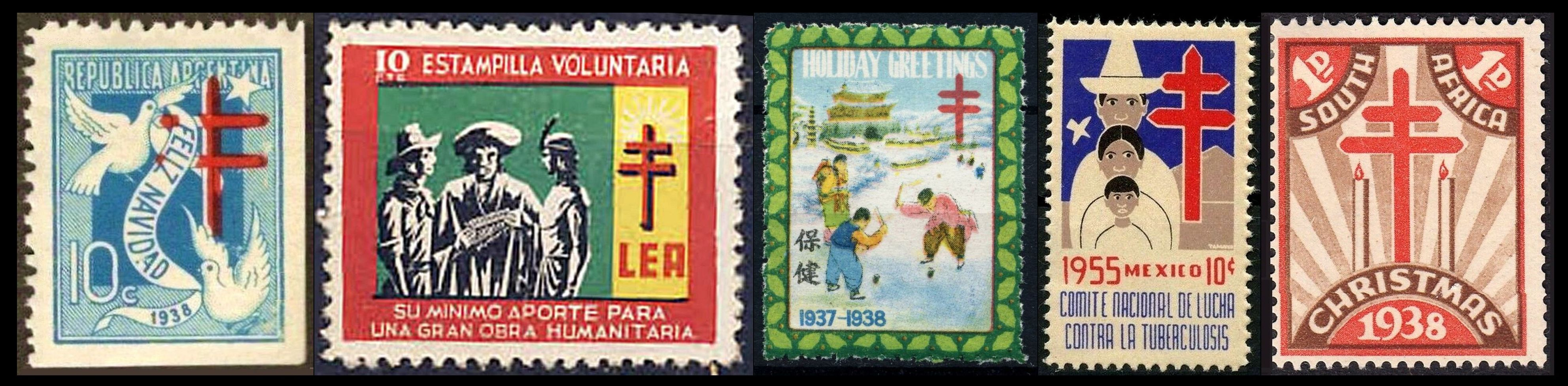
From left to right: Argentina, 1938, Chile, 1940s, Korea 1937-1938, Mexico, 1955, South Africa, 1938

In Korea, Christmas seals were first introduced on December 3, 1932 by two medical missionaries, Dr. Sherwood Hall and Dr. Marian Hall. The couple founded the first tuberculosis hospital in Korea, the Haeju School for Tuberculosis. They introduced the Christmas seals to raise funds to fight tuberculosis and educate people on prevention of the disease. All religions and nationalities in Korea were represented, and it received funds and aid from the Church of England, the United Church of Canada as well as various health organizations within Korea itself.

Mexico, through the Comite Nacional de Lucha contra la Tuberculosis, in their effort to fight the dreaded lung disease, issued its first Christmas seals in 1943.

== Usage ==
Beginning in 1907 when Christmas seals were first issued the incident of seals used in place of postage stamps became a common problem. In 1911, the U.S. Post Office adopted a policy that prohibited the placement of Christmas Seals on the same side of a postcard or envelope as the address. By 1930 the problem became less prevalent.

Before 1930 nearly all Christmas Seals found on U.S. mail were used on Christmas greetings postcards, as there were no commercial Christmas Cards with envelopes and postage for postcards was only a penny. Today postcards with Christmas seals tied on with a postmark with the same year date as the Christmas seal for that year are not common and often scarce, and in some instances rare.

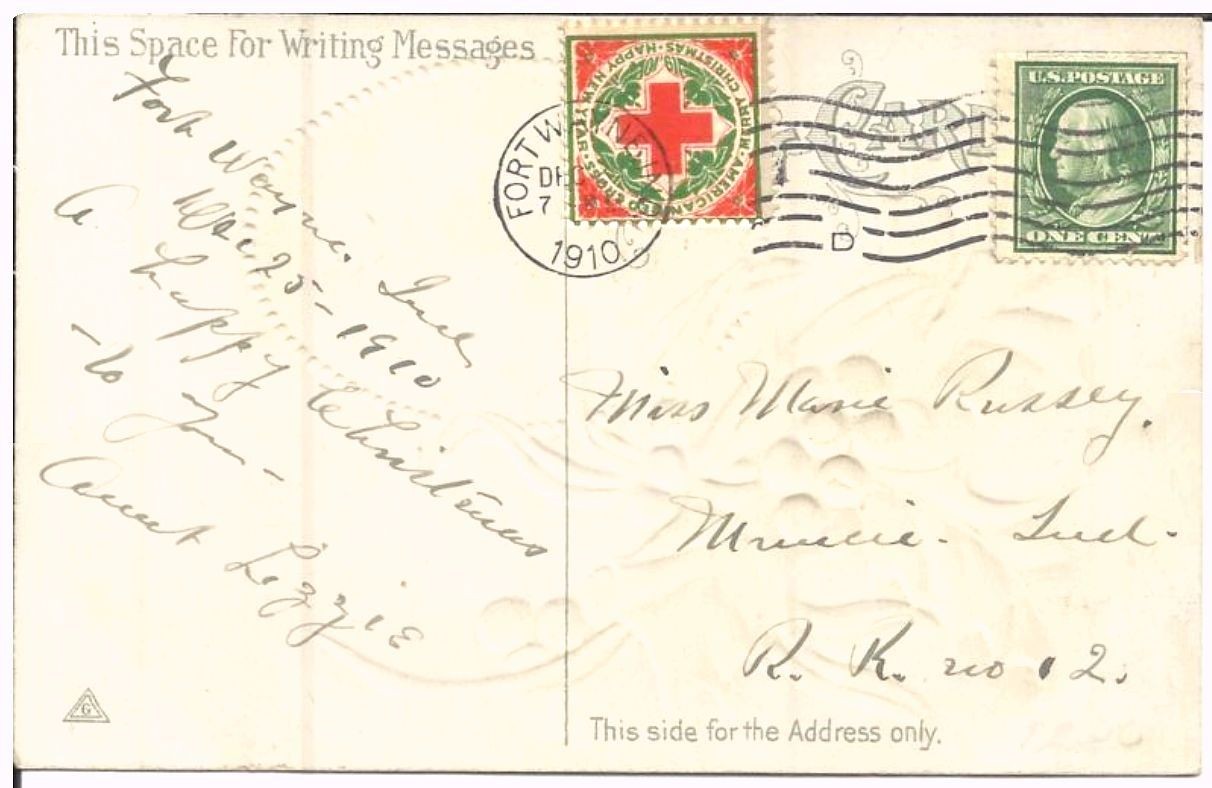
A postcard with United States postage and Christmas Seal, postmarked December 21, 1910

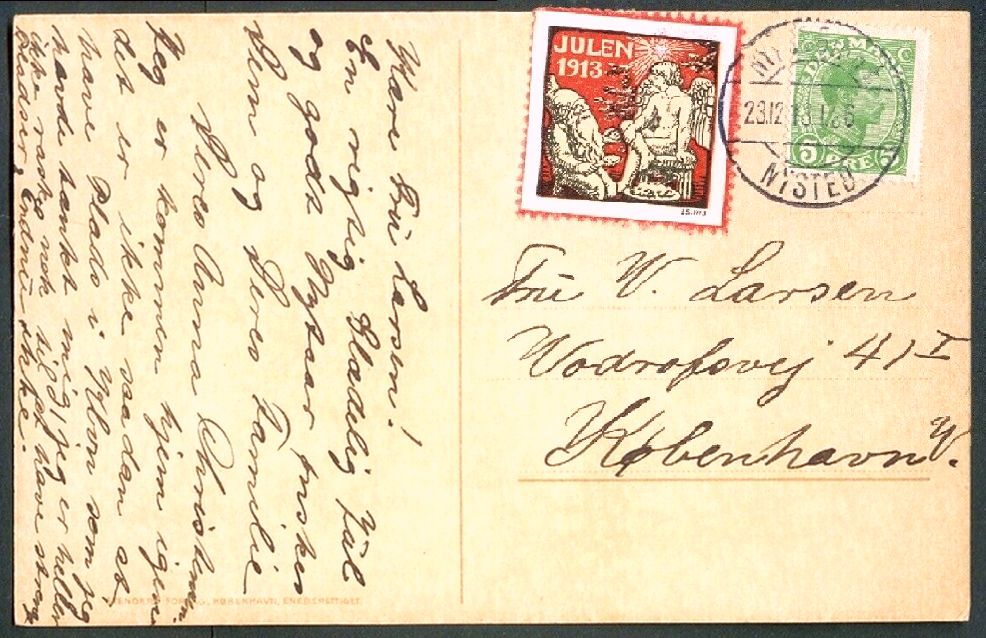
A postcard with Danish postage and Christmas seal, postmarked December 23, 1913

== Other types ==
Many other seals to raise funding for charitable efforts were issued during Christmas season, often with Christmas themes, by religious organizations, civic and fraternal societies, patriotic organizations, etc. Since they were not issued to fight tuberculosis specifically they lack the double barred Cross of Lorraine, the international symbol for the fight against tuberculosis, which was proposed and established in 1902 at the International Conference on Tuberculosis in Berlin Germany, and strictly speaking do not qualify as what is commonly known as Christmas seals.

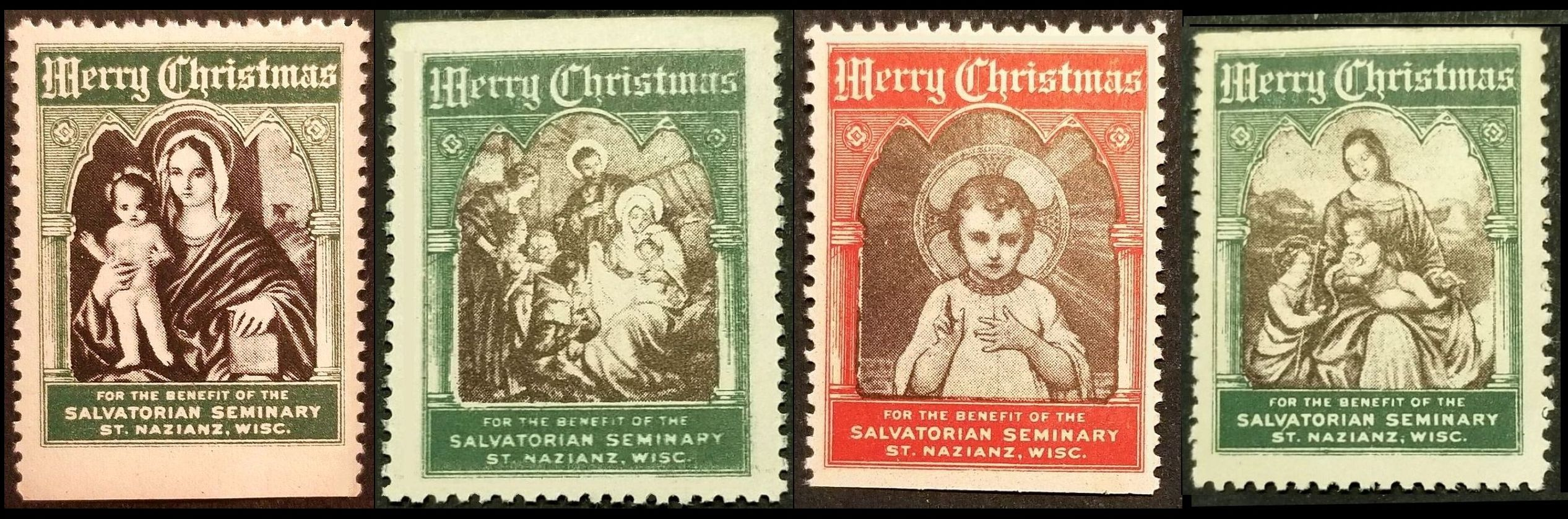
A selection of Salvatorian Seminary Catholic charity seals of 1920

Between 1937 and 1943 the Danish Nazi Party (DNSAP) issued a variety of seals featuring the Nazi swastika. These scarce seals contain Christmas themes like holly, but there is no indication on these seals that connect them to the fight against tuberculosis, and for this reason, they are not listed in Green's Catalog.

Authorized by the Vatican, The Holy Childhood Association Program was founded in 1843 to be of service to schools and religious education programs. The Association distributes educational and fund-raising programs to school and religious education programs throughout the United States. To help bring recognition and raise funding for the program.the Holy Childhood foundation issues their own type of Christmas seal for sale at various Catholic Churches and other institutions.

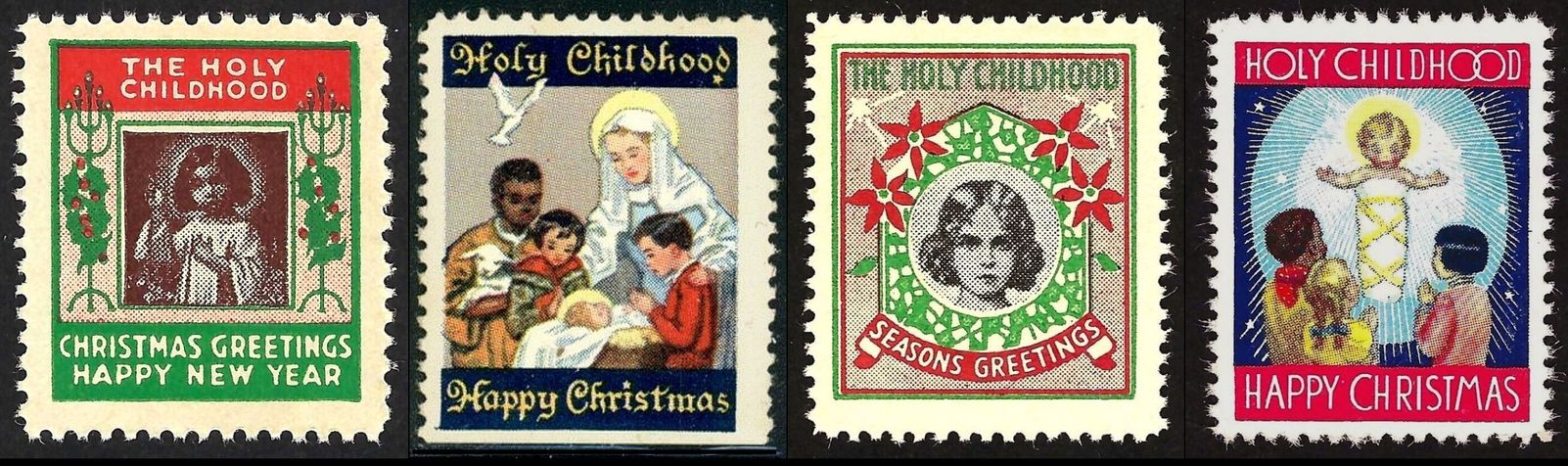
A selection of Holy Childhood Charity Christmas seals

History has shown that most dictatorial regimes suspend Christmas seals from being issued. This happened in Korea under the Japanese occupation, China under the communists, and Argentina under Eva Peron.

== Collecting ==
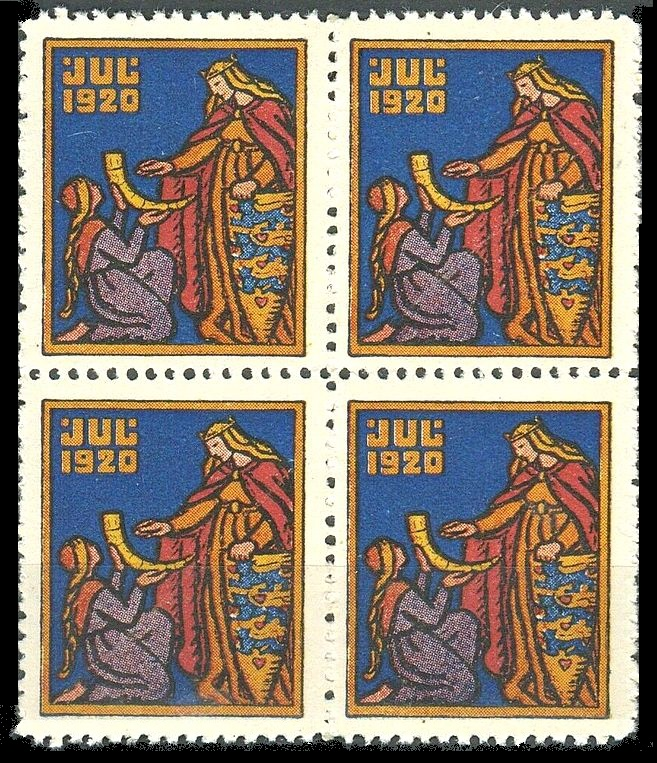
Danish Christmas seals in a block of four, 1920 issue

When Christmas seals first appeared at the beginning of the 20th century they received much favor and acclaim from the general public, and from stamp and postal history collectors in particular. Prices for the various issues can range from inexpensive, to moderately priced to those of considerable value, depending on availability, type, (Note: Stamps and seals of a different "type" are most often those with minor, often unnoticeable, differences in the design, perforation gauge or color(s) used in the printing process..) centering and condition.

The catalogue value of a Christmas seal, as with postage stamps and coins, usually increases over time. For example, in 1935 the Scott Catalogue (Note: The Scott Catalogue is considered one of the leading authorities on postage stamps and related items.) value for a Christmas seal issued in 1915 was 25-cents. In 1983 its catalogue value increased to $4. By 2014 the Scott Catalogue Value was fixed at $9.00. Used seals, and those with no gum and/or have a straight edge on one side, usually command about one-half the price of a seal in unused, (mint) fine to very fine (F-VF) condition.

In cases where a Christmas seal is tied (Note: "Tied" is a term used by collectors to define a stamp with a postmark on an envelope which overlaps the stamp.) alongside a postage stamp, with a postmark with the same year date in which the given Christmas seal was issued often commands much higher prices than those that have been cancelled and are no longer affixed to a postcard or envelope. As with various postage stamps, Christmas seals that exist in a 'block of four' are often scarce and can increase the value much higher than what four separate Christmas seals might be worth.

In December 2014, a postcard bearing a rare variety of a 1911, type 5, considered the rarest U.S. Christmas seal, sold at auction on eBay for a record amount of $3,433.83. The postcard was postmarked December 20, 1911, at Station C in Los Angeles and mailed to Fort Wayne, Indiana In another definitive example, a 1919 issue U.S. Christmas seal of a rare type was sold at auction and realized a price of $3,872,533.

In the United States beginning in 1936, the town of Santa Claus, Indiana has often been regarded by many collectors as the "official" First Day City for the initial release of Christmas seal issues in the United States. Special cacheted covers were often prepared in quantities that range from 500 to 2000. The quantities produced were documented for many years by The Christmas Seal and Charity Stamp Society members Joe Wheeler and Jerry Grigaitis. In 1936 the Santa Claus Postmaster would not allow the seals to be tied by a postmark, however, that policy was sometimes overlooked and a few covers received a postmark. Such covers command a substantial premium in the collecting world.

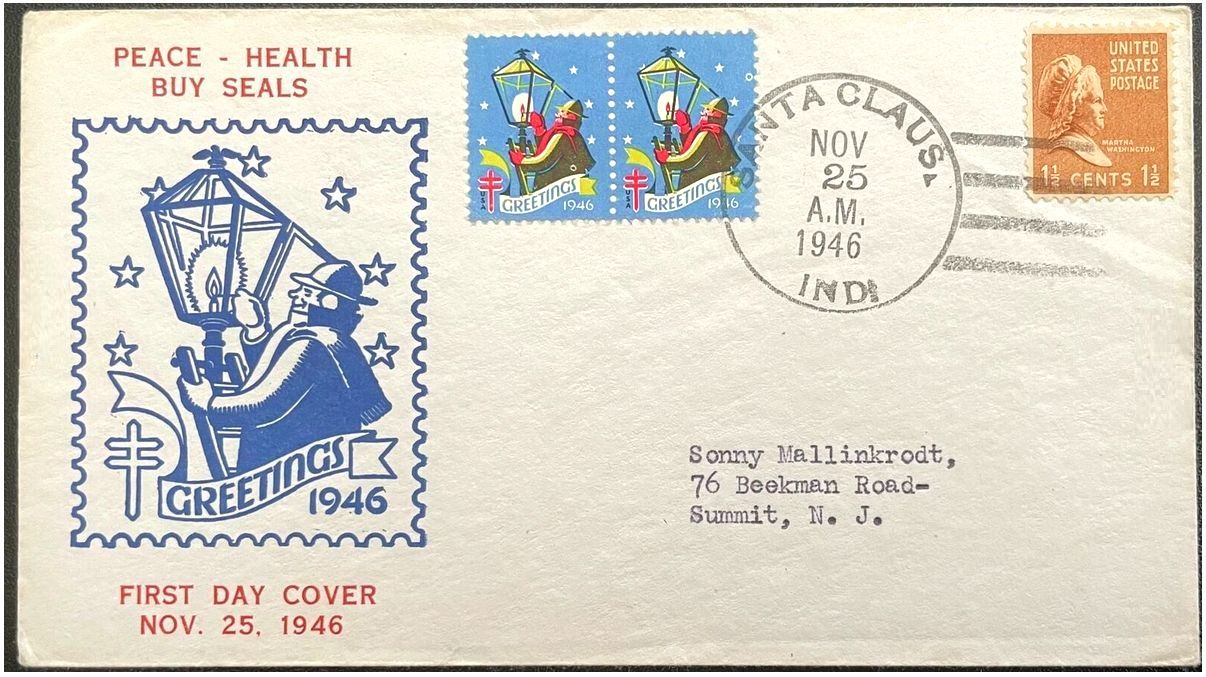
Christmas seal, first day cover, 1946, postmarked in Santa Claus, Indiana

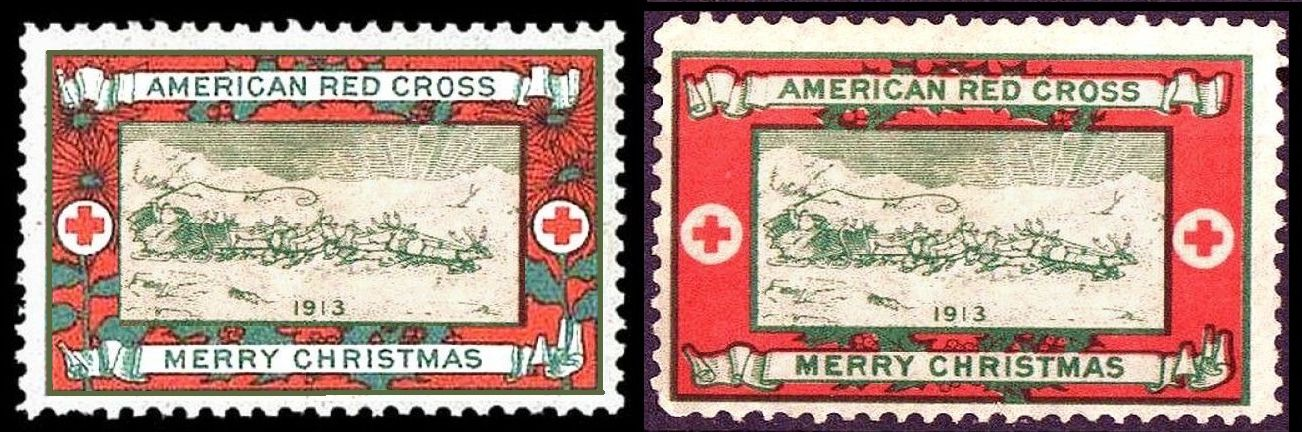
Christmas Seals, 1913 issue, types I & III, Printed by the American Bank Note Company Type I (at left) with poinsettia flowers in the side panels, is extremely rare, with only one sheet extant. (Note: The Scott catalogue vale in 2017 was $1400) It is often considered the "Holy Grail", of Christmas Seal collecting.

One of the oldest Christmas seal societies of service to collectors of Christmas seals is The Christmas Seal and Charity Stamp Society, founded in 1931, an affiliate of the American Philatelic Society. It functions as a source of information for collectors and publishes a quarterly journal, Seal News, and a large catalog of Christmas seal collecting literature. They also conduct auctions through each issue of their journal.

== See also ==
- The Christmas Seal & Charity Stamp Society
- Easter Seals A charitable organization for helping handicapped children.
- Easter seals (philately) Easter seals in stamp collecting.
- Strobridge Lithographing Company — Long time printers of Christmas Seals

== Bibliography ==
- Cabeen, Richard McP (1979). Standard handbook of stamp collecting. Crowell. ISBN 978-0-69001-7731.
- "1913 Christmas Seal Types". Seal Society.
- Clar, Mimi (October 1959). "Attack on Santa Claus". Western Folklore. 18 (4): 337. doi:10.2307/1497769. JSTOR 1497769.
- Collins, Ace (2003). Stories behind the great traditions of Christmas. Grand Rapids, Mich.: Zondervan. ISBN 978-0-31024-8804.
- Del Re, Gerard (1979). The Christmas almanack. Garden City, N.Y.: Doubleday. ISBN 038-513353-7.
- Denune, John Jr., ed. (2014). The Christmas Seal Catalog (PDF). The Christmas Seal and Charity Stamp Society. "The Christmas Seal Catalog is a simplified version of Green's Catalog of TB Seals of the World, part 1, U.S. National Christmas Seals."
- Denune, John. "US Christmas Seals Tied On". John Denune's ChristmasSeals.net.
- Denune, John Jr. "(Christmas Seal) Bonds". ChristmasSeals.net.
- Gigliotti, Gilbert L. (2002). A Storied Singer: Frank Sinatra as Literary Conceit. Bloomsbury Academic. ISBN 978-0-31330-9731.
- Green, Dick (1946–1947). Gilbert, Charles B. (ed.). Green's catalog of the Tuberculosis Seals of the World (revised through 1946). The Christmas Seal and Charity Stamp Society.
- Hall, Sherwood (1933). The Story of Korea's First Christmas Seal (PDF). YMCA Press, Seoul, Korea.
- Hotchner, John M. (2016). "When Christmas seals were placed on mail where they shouldn't be". Linn's Stamp News.
- Krythe, Maymie Richardson (1954). All about Christmas. New York: Harper & Brothers.
- Long, Esmond R. (April 1957). "Development of the Voluntary Health Movement in America as Illustrated in the Pioneer National Tuberculosis Association". Proceedings of the American Philosophical Society. 101 (2). American Philatelic Society: 142–148. JSTOR 985505.
- Scott Specialized Catalogue of United States stamps. New York, N.Y: Scott Publications. 1969.
- Houseman, Donna, ed. (2017). Scott 2017 specialized catalogue of United States stamps & covers. Sidney, Ohio: Amos Media. ISBN 978-0-89487-513-7.
- Scott Specialized 1935 Christmas Seal Section (PDF). New York: Scott publishing Company. 1935.
- Scott Specialized Catalogue of United States stamps. New York, NY: Scott Publishing Company. 1983.
- Scott 2017 Standard Postage Stamp Catalogue, Volume 2- Countries of the World C-F (Scott 2017. Vol. 2. Scott Publishing Company. 2016. ISBN 978-0-89487-5083.
- "The American Red Cross and the First Christmas Seals". The American Red Cross.
- This Day in History... December 7, 1907, First U.S. Christmas Seals (PDF). Camden, New York: Mystic Stamp Company. 2023.
- Media, Delaware Public (15 December 2011). "History Matters: Christmas Seals - The Legacy of Emily Bissell". www.delawarepublic.org.
- Venkatesan, Priya (August 2014). "Historical Profile, Emily Perkins Bissell" (PDF). The Lancet. 2.
- "Tied U.S. Christmas seal variety brings record price in recent auction on eBay". Linn's Stamp News. Sydney, Ohio. December 4, 2014.
- "Complex 1913 Christmas seal provides many challenges". Linn's Stamp News. January 8, 2024.
- "The Union Christmas seals exhibition and contest calls for designs". International Union Against Tuberculosis and Lung Disease. 24 August 2020.
- "Holy Childhood, History". Association of the Holy Childhood. 19 January 2015.
- Denune, John. "African American Related Seals". ChristmasSeals.net.
  Maanual and Catalog of NAACP seals
- "Denmark: Christmas Seals: Christmas Seals - Danish Nazi Party". Jay Smith & Associates.
- "A History of Christmas Seals in Canada". BREATHE, The Lung Association.
- "The Christmas Seal and Charity Stamp Society".
