= Trek Across Maine =

The Trek Across Maine is a multi-day, multi-route option cycling event, beginning and ending in Brunswick, Maine. The event draws an estimated 2,000 cyclists and 750 volunteers annually.

Hosted by the American Lung Association, the Trek Across Maine has raised more than $24 million since its inception.
