= Sigard Adolphus Knopf =

German-born American physician (1857–1940)

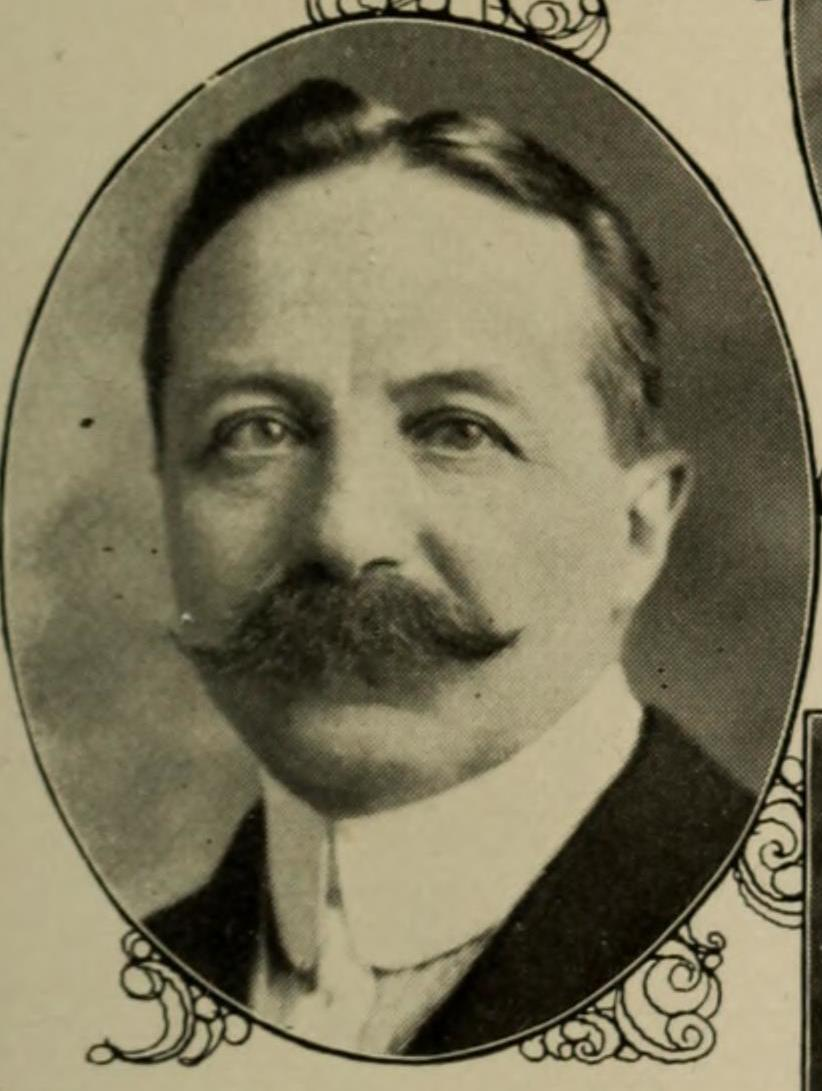
- Born: November 27, 1857; Halle-on-the-Saale, Saxony, Kingdom of Prussia
- Died: July 15, 1940 (aged 82); New York, New York, U.S.
- Education: University of Southern California; Bellevue Hospital Medical School; University of Paris; University of France
- Occupation: Physician
- Spouse(s): Perle Nora Dyar (m. 1889) Julia Marie Frederick (m. 1935)
- Children: 3

Sigard Adolphus Knopf (November 27, 1857 – July 15, 1940) was a Kingdom of Prussia-born American physician.

Born Siegmund Knopf on November 27, 1857, he received his early education at the Higher Municipal School in Halle-on-the-Saale before moving to the United States in 1880. After being an instructor in non-English languages in the Los Angeles area he matriculated to the University of Southern California, where he studied during 1884–86. In 1888 he graduated with an M.D. from Bellevue Hospital Medical School, then practiced medicine in Los Angeles for two years. He was married to Perle Nora Dyar in 1889; the couple would have no children. Leaving for France to study at the University of Paris, he received an A.B. and B.S. from the institution in 1891. For the next four years he worked at hospitals in Paris while studying at the University of France, where he received his second M.D. in 1895.

Following his work at a Paris hospital for tuberculosis patients, he returned to the United States in 1896 where he became a specialist in the treatment of the disease. During this time, he hired M. Maria (Mable) Gordon as a secretary in his New York office. He and Mable had three children all of whom he educated at the finest schools and colleges on the east coast. He introduced his two daughters, Lucille and Gertrude, at the International Debutante Ball in Brussels and financially supported the children taking them to Europe with him. Lucille attended Columbia University, Gertrude went to Barnard College and Ken graduated from Brown where all of his children would also go. Knopf had dual residences in Europe and New York.

In 1898, his book titled Pulmonary tuberculosis; its modern prophylaxis and the treatment in special institutions and at home was awarded the Alvarenga prize by the College of Physicians of Philadelphia. His 1900 book Tuberculosis as a disease of the masses and how to combat it was awarded the international prize by the International Congress to Combat Tuberculosis as a Disease of the Masses. This work led to the formation of the Committee for the Prevention of Tuberculosis by New York health professionals and the local business and social elite. In 1904, he helped found the National Tuberculosis Association, since renamed the American Lung Association. During this time, Adolphus gained international acclaim as one of the world's most successful lung surgeons treating TB. Heads of national from all of the world sought his counsel in helping to treat and eradicate TB which had become a pandemic threat.

A proponent of eugenics, in 1914 he helped organize the First National Conference for Race Betterment. He called tuberculosis patients that bore children 'criminals' and was in favor of mandatory sterilization for patients that "procreated willfully". During World War I, he was given the rank of captain in the U.S. Army Medical Corps and helped to establish procedures for the prevention of pneumonia and tuberculosis. During his career he published over 400 works. He favored rehabilitation of prostitutes and was a proponent for the establishment of birth-control clinics in order to counter the poverty and health issues associated with large families. He was a friend and supporter of Margaret Sanger giving many important speeches on the merits of birth control as well as picking her up from jail. He helped her found the American Birth Control League which later became Planned Parenthood. Knopf was a member of the Committee of One Hundred on National Health that lobbied for the formation of a national department of health.

A collection of his papers is held at the National Library of Medicine.

== Bibliography ==
- Pulmonary tuberculosis; its modern prophylaxis and the treatment in special institutions and at home (1898)
- Aspects of birth control (1900)
- Tuberculosis as a disease of the masses and how to combat it (1900)
- The home treatment of tuberculosis (1907)
- Birth control in its medical, social, economic and moral aspects (1917)
- William T. G. Morton the discoverer and revealer of surgical anesthesia at last in the Hall of fame-—a vindication (1921)
- A history of the National Tuberculosis Association (1922)
