= American Lung Association =

Non-profit organization dedicated to preventing lung disease and promoting lung health

- Abbreviation: Lung Association
- Formation: 1904; 122 years ago (as National Association for the Study and Prevention of Tuberculosis)
- Type: Non-profit
- Purpose: Preventing lung disease and promoting lung health
- Headquarters: Chicago, Illinois, United States
- Members: 32,000
- National President and Chief Executive Officer: Harold P. Wimmer
- Website: Lung.org
- Formerly called: National Association for the Study and Prevention of Tuberculosis (1904–1918); National Tuberculosis Association (1918–1968); National Tuberculosis and Respiratory Disease Association (1968–1973); American Lung Association (since 1973)

The American Lung Association is a voluntary health organization whose mission is to save lives by improving lung health and preventing lung disease through education, advocacy, and research.

== History ==
=== 1904–1918: Founding ===
The organization was founded in 1904 to fight tuberculosis (TB) as the National Association for the Study and Prevention of Tuberculosis (NASPT) by Edward Livingston Trudeau, Robert Hall Babcock, Henry Martyn Hall, Lawrence Flick, and S. Adolphus Knopf. Earlier in 1892, Flick had founded the Pennsylvania Society for the Prevention of Tuberculosis, the world's first society dedicated to the preventing TB. In 1907, the Lung Association began their Christmas Seal campaign to raise money for a small TB sanatorium in Delaware. Emily Bissell, a Red Cross volunteer at the time, created holiday seals to sell at the post office for a penny a piece. By the end of her fundraising campaign, she had raised more than ten times the amount needed to save the sanatorium, and the tradition of Christmas Seals was launched.

=== 1918–1973 ===
The NASPT was renamed the National Tuberculosis Association (NTA) in 1918, and then the National Tuberculosis and Respiratory Disease Association (NTRDA) in 1968; it adopted its current name in 1973.

=== 1973–2018 ===
The association is a defender of the Clean Air Act.

In 1978, Ethelene Crockett became the first woman and first African-American woman appointed president of the organization.

In October 2018, the association launched its school-based initiative, "Yoga Power", a program designed to increase awareness of the importance of lung health, at Woodward Elementary School in Delaware, Ohio.

== Logo and tagline ==
A modified version of the Cross of Lorraine serves as the Lung Association's logo. The Paris, France, physician Gilbert Sersiron suggested its use in 1902 as a symbol for the "crusade" against tuberculosis. The double barred cross was originally used in the coat of arms of Godfrey of Bouillon, Duke of Lower Lorraine, a leader of the first crusade and elected ruler of Jerusalem after its capture in 1099.

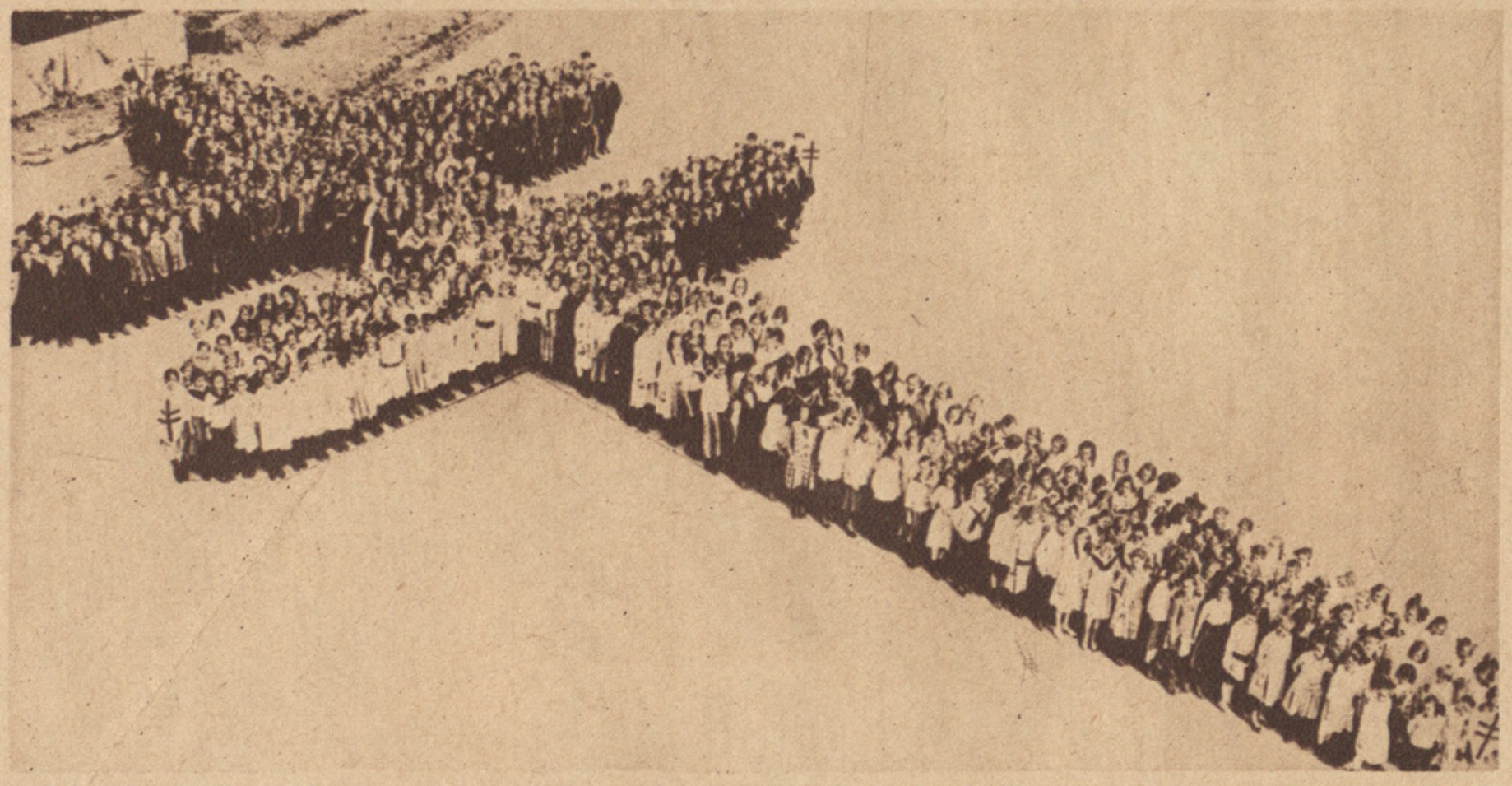
In 1919 several hundred Philadelphia school children form a living TB double cross, the logo at the time of the National Tuberculosis Association.

The national tagline "Fighting for Air" was introduced in 2010 to emphasize the organization's role in reducing particulate pollution in the atmosphere and in public places. While the Cross of Lorraine was colored red since its adoption, it was changed to blue in 2021.

== Funding ==
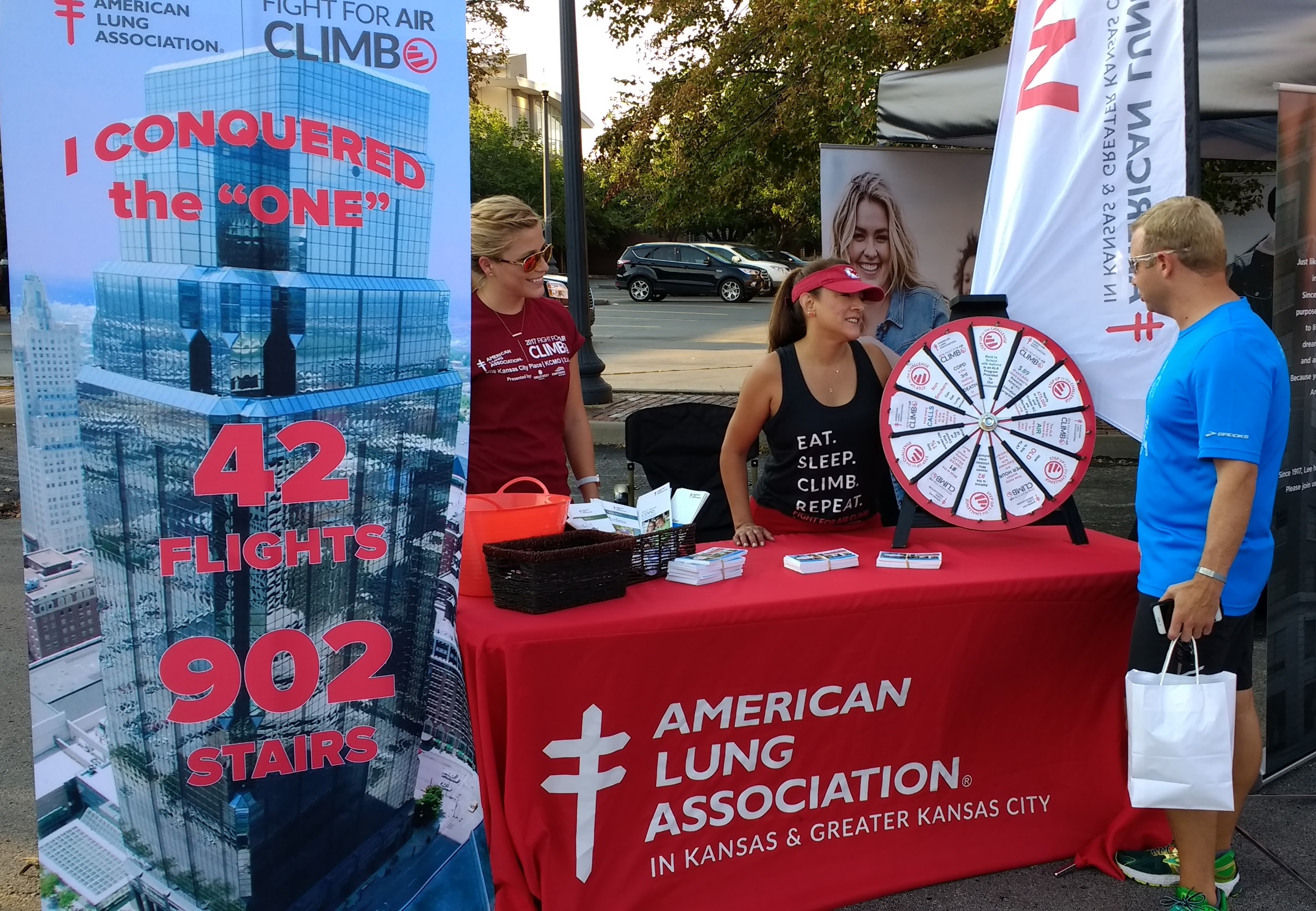
An American Lung Association booth at a local 5k race in Kansas City

The American Lung Association is a public health organization funded by contributions from individual donors, corporations, foundations and government agency grants. One of its best-known fundraising campaigns is its Christmas Seals program, which has been an annual fundraising and public awareness tool for tuberculosis and lung disease since 1907.

The Lake Tour Bike Trek is an annual bicycle ride held at Illinois in early June with all donations going towards the American Lung Association of Illinois. The Trek Across Maine, a similar bicycle ride in Maine, has raised more than $24 million since 1985.

Annual fundraising events include Fight for Air Climb in the Spring and Run the Rocks in the Fall.

== Notable participants ==
The National Association for the Study and Prevention of Tuberculosis held their ninth annual meeting in Washington, D.C., May 8 and 9, 1913. In attendance were Association President Homer Folks, Honorary Vice President Theodore Roosevelt, Vice Presidents Robert Hall Babcock, Sir William Osler and Edward R. Baldwin, Treasurer William H. Baldwin, Secretary Henry Barton Jacobs. Notable life members included Andrew Carnegie, Henry C. Frick, Mrs. H. Knickerbocker, Louis Marshall, Francis E. May, Cyrus H. McCormick, Henry Phipps, John D. Rockefeller, Rodman Wanamaker, Felix M. Warburg. The association members recommended a public health committee be formed by The National Association for the Study and Prevention of Tuberculosis and be officially sanctioned by the United States House of Representatives. In addition, they adopted the double red cross emblem formally as the symbol for the association and its fight against tuberculosis. The National Association for the Study and Prevention of Tuberculosis executive offices were located at 105 East 22nd Street, New York, New York. Henry Martyn Hall of Pittsburgh, Pennsylvania, is one of the ten original founders and was honored at the 50th Anniversary Annual Meeting of the National Tuberculosis Association at Atlantic City, New Jersey, in 1954. U.S. President Grover Cleveland was an honorary vice president from 1905 to 1908; U.S. President Theodore Roosevelt was an honorary vice president from 1905 to 1919.
