= Marian Bottomley Hall =

English missionary (1896–1991)

Marian Bottomley Hall (21 Jun 1896 – 19 Sep 1991) was a Methodist medical missionary who spent 15 years in Korea and over 20 years in India. She and her husband introduced the first Christmas seals in Korea and their work is in the Smithsonian Institute's National Postal Museum.

== Education ==
Marian Bottomley worked as a school teacher from 1915 to 1917, in both Bishop Mills, Ontario and Rootstown, Ohio. She attended Mount Union College in Alliance, Ohio and graduated in 1922. Hall received her medical degree in 1924 from the Women's Medical College in Philadelphia, Pennsylvania. She returned to England for specialized medical training at the School of Tropical Medicine, University of London in 1926.

== Mission ==
In 1926, Hall and her husband started their mission at the Norton Memorial Hospital in Haeju, Korea. In the same year, they built the first tuberculosis sanatorium in Korea, the Haeju School for Tuberculosis. To support their work, they introduced Christmas seals. These originated in Denmark and became a way of spreading awareness and raising funds for tuberculosis. The Halls' first Christmas seals were issued on December 3, 1932, and were successful in educating the public and generating revenue. Five local newspapers at the time wrote about the initiative. The seals generated 49,000 Yen in the first year and 296,700 Yen in the second year.

Korea was under Japanese colonial Rule and in 1940, the Japanese government accused the Halls of espionage. The government forced them to leave the country.

The couple relocated to Rajasthan, India and were assigned to Madar Union Tuberculosis Sanatorium. In 1941, they introduced the Christmas seal program with another successful outcome. The Halls improved and expanded the capacity of the sanatorium. In India, Hall primarily worked in the villages using a van that acted as a mobile clinic. She helped treat trachoma. She also started a baby welfare clinic and taught hygiene to mothers.

== Personal life ==
On June 21, 1922, she married Sherwood Hall, another graduate of Mount Union College. He was born and raised in Korea by two medical missionaries, Rosetta Sherwood Hall and William James Hall. Hall had four children, all born in Korea. One died in infancy.

== Death and legacy ==
Hall died on September 19, 1991, in Richmond, Virginia. Her husband had died a few months prior. Both her and her husband's ashes were taken to Korea where they were interred in the same plot in Seoul, Korea.

In addition to her missionary work, Hall helped found a branch of Planned Parenthood.
