= Einar Holbøll =

Postmaster and philanthropist from Denmark

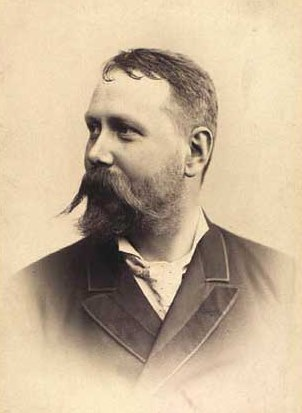
- Holbøll in 1900.
- Born: December 20, 1865; Holmen, Copenhagen, Denmark
- Died: February 23, 1927 (aged 61); Charlottenlund, Copenhagen, Denmark
- Occupations: Postmaster, philanthropist
- Known for: Creator of Christmas seals

Einar Holbøll (December 20, 1865 – February 23, 1927) was a postmaster and philanthropist from Denmark who conceived the idea of Christmas Seals and was fundamentally involved in their issuance. They were sold at post offices to raise much needed funds to research and fight tuberculosis, an incurable lung disease that was occurring in alarming proportions in Denmark and other countries around the world, esp among children. After much effort, Holbøll, convinced the Danish government to issue Christmas Seals, and in December, 1904, Denmark issued its first Christmas Seal. Christmas Seals were soon adapted by other countries, including Sweden, Norway, Iceland and the United States. Subsequently, the association between Christmas seals and their usage with the fight against tuberculosis became prevalent throughout the twentieth century. The great success of the Christmas seal provided the badly need funding to make the effort to fight tuberculosis possible.

== Background ==
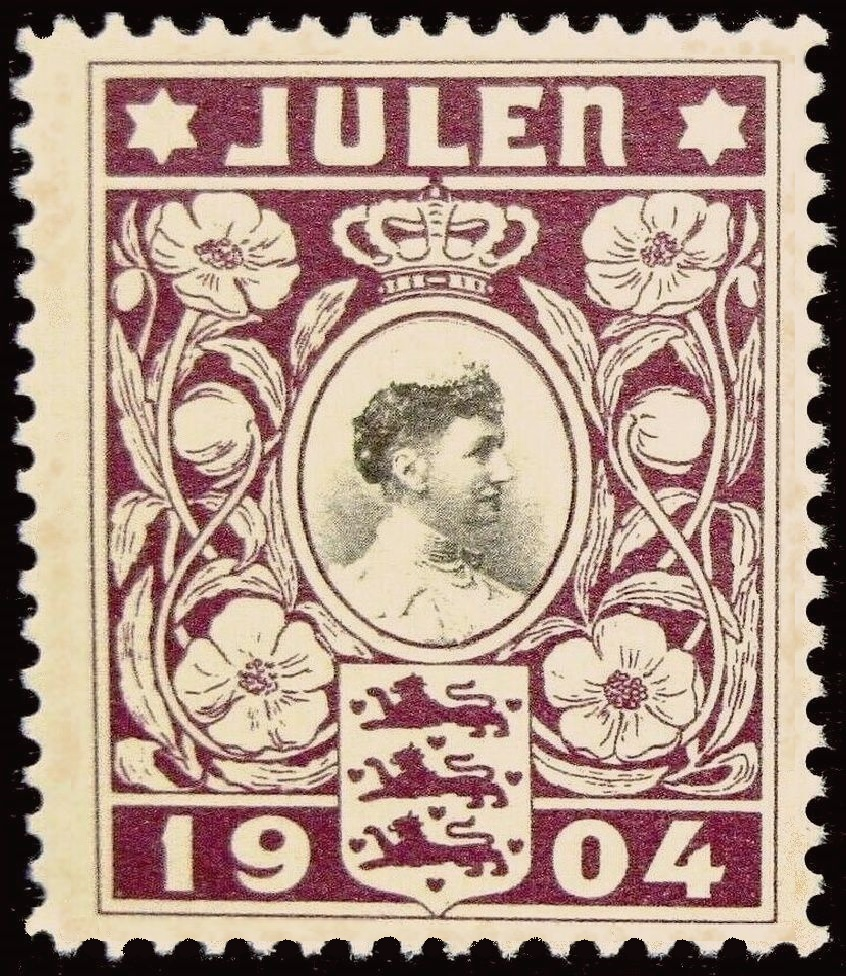
The world's first Christmas seal. Issued in Denmark, 1904, features the Danish Queen Louise (Note: "Julen" is Danish for 'Christmas')

Holbøll joined the Danish Navy in 1880, taking his preliminary examination in 1883. While on duty he studied for the mateship examination. Because of an eye disease, however, he had to give up this naval career. In 1866 he joined the Danish postal service, and soon became a post office clerk in 1892 and was employed by Kbh., until he became postmaster in Gentofte in 1905, and in Charlottenlund in 1909. As a member of the Danish Post Office Holbøll was able to assume a position as a board member of the Post and Telegraph Association, he conceived of the idea to use the many Christmas greetings that came through the post office for philanthropic purposes with a special Christmas label, which was to be sold as a means of raising funding to fight tuberculosis and help with other charitable efforts. He passed this idea on to his fellow postal workers and other, most of whom though his idea had promise and subsequently the idea reached the King Christian IX of Denmark and decided to give Holbøll's idea a try.

With much public support and with the King's blessing Holbøll was able to have the Danish postal service print Christmas seals and sell them for a penny a piece throughout post offices across Denmark. The first Christmas seal, bearing the likeness of Queen Louise, was released on December 10, 1904, premiering as the world's first Christmas seal. The demand at the post office for Christmas seals proved enormous and far exceeded expectations. That year more than four million letters and postcards carried the seal, generating more than $40,000, which was a considerable sum of money in 1904. Sweden followed with its own Christmas seals that year, as did Norway in 1906, and the United States in 1907. The money raised was used for the construction of the ChristmasTree sanatorium, in Kolding. Its funding and management was entrusted to the National Association for fight against Tuberculosis, and was also slated for the establishment of various convalescent homes for afflicted children throughout Denmark.

Originally Holbøll wanted the revenue produced by Christmas seals to be used for the construction and operation of a hospital for lost children, hoping to come to the aid of unmarried mothers who might otherwise be forced to kill their newborn children because of overwhelming hardships. This idea, however, was met with many objections.

Well aware of the plight that tuberculosis had upon the people of Denmark, and elsewhere in the world, he became involved in philanthropic efforts and decided to build a foundation for the association at FRBG a charitable organization in Copenhagen, and the plan was changed to aim for children with tuberculosis, knowing that hospitals were few and funding was almost unavailable to treat those with the dreaded disease.

== Legacy ==
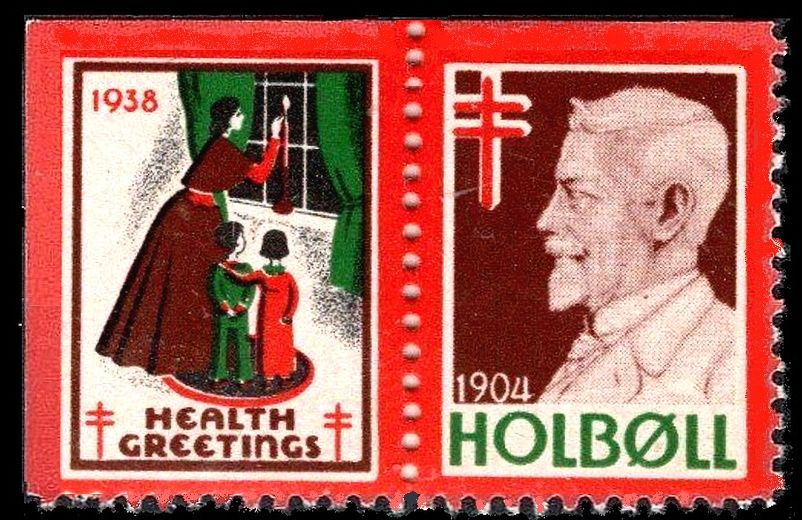
In 1938 Holbøll was featured on a U.S. Christmas seal

Holbøll was born on December 20, 1865, in Holmen, Copenhagen. He died at the age of 61 on February 23, 1927, in Charlottenlund in Copenhagen. He lived to see the money generated from Christmas seals used to build sanatoriums for afflicted children. Holbøll was decorated by three Kings for his pioneering efforts. By the time of Holbøll's death, forty-five nations were issuing and using Christmas seals to fight the dreaded disease of tuberculosis. Holbøll was buried in Ordrup, also in Copenhagen.

Several countries have honored Einar Holbøll by featuring him on their Christmas Seals and postage stamps, including Denmark in 1978, Belgium, in 1955 and the United States in 1938.

== See also ==
- Edward Livingston Trudeau — American physician who established the Adirondack Cottage Sanitarium in 1885 at Saranac Lake for the treatment of tuberculosis
- Robert Koch Physician who pioneered the effort to investigate the causes behind tuberculosis.
- Emily Bissell -- Founder of Christmas seals in the United States
- Semi-postal stamps used for charitable efforts.
- Tuberculosis elimination

== Sources ==
- Denune, John Jr., ed. (2014). The Christmas Seal Catalog (PDF). The Christmas Seal and Charity Stamp Society. "The Christmas Seal Catalog is a simplified version of Green's Catalog of TB Seals of the World, part 1, U.S. National Christmas Seals."
- Ostler, Fred J. (1947). Father of the Christmas Seal (PDF). Coronet Printing.
- Rossi, Julia. "The Philatelic Physician: A Global Tour of Medical Postage Stamps". International Museum of Surgical Science.
- "Einar Holbøll (translated from Danish to English)". Danish Biographical Lexicon.
- "Tuberculosis, Philately and the history of the 'Christmas seal'". BSHM: British Society for the History of Medicine.
