= Lake Tour Bike Trek =

Charity cycle event

The Lake Tour Bike Trek is a two- or three-day bicycle ride, usually in the beginning of June, supporting the American Lung Association. It has taken place since 1985, and by 2007 had raised over 1.5 million dollars for the American Lung Association of Illinois. It claims to be "the midwest's premier bike ride."

== Description ==
This bike ride is roundtrip from McHenry County College in Crystal Lake, IL to The Abbey Resort in Fontana, WI on Geneva Lake. Each day of biking is about 50 miles.

The Two-Day Ride starts out at McHenry County College on the Saturday of the weekend. Bikers follow a detailed route on quiet public roads up to The Abbey Resort on Geneva Lake, where they stay the night. The next day the bikers bike from The Abbey Resort back to McHenry County College.

The Three-Day Ride starts out at McHenry County College on the Friday of the weekend. Bikers follow the same detailed route the Two-Day riders will follow the next day. These riders stay at the Abbey Resort both Friday and Saturday nights. On the Saturday of the weekend, the riders bike on a detailed route on quiet public roads around Geneva Lake. Then on Sunday they ride with the Two-Day riders back to McHenry County College in Crystal Lake, IL.

There are many volunteers helping throughout the route, including two rest stops each day, medical support, and bike support. These volunteers work on both the Two-Day and Three-Day rides. The rest stops and included meals are designed for a cyclist's appetite. The private ambulance service that advertises on the ride, provides an ambulance on the route each day. A bike shop is available throughout the weekend as well in case any bicycles need repairs.

All donations go to the American Lung Association to help fight COPD, asthma, and lung disease.
