= Emily Bissell =

American activist (1861–1948)

Emily Perkins Bissell
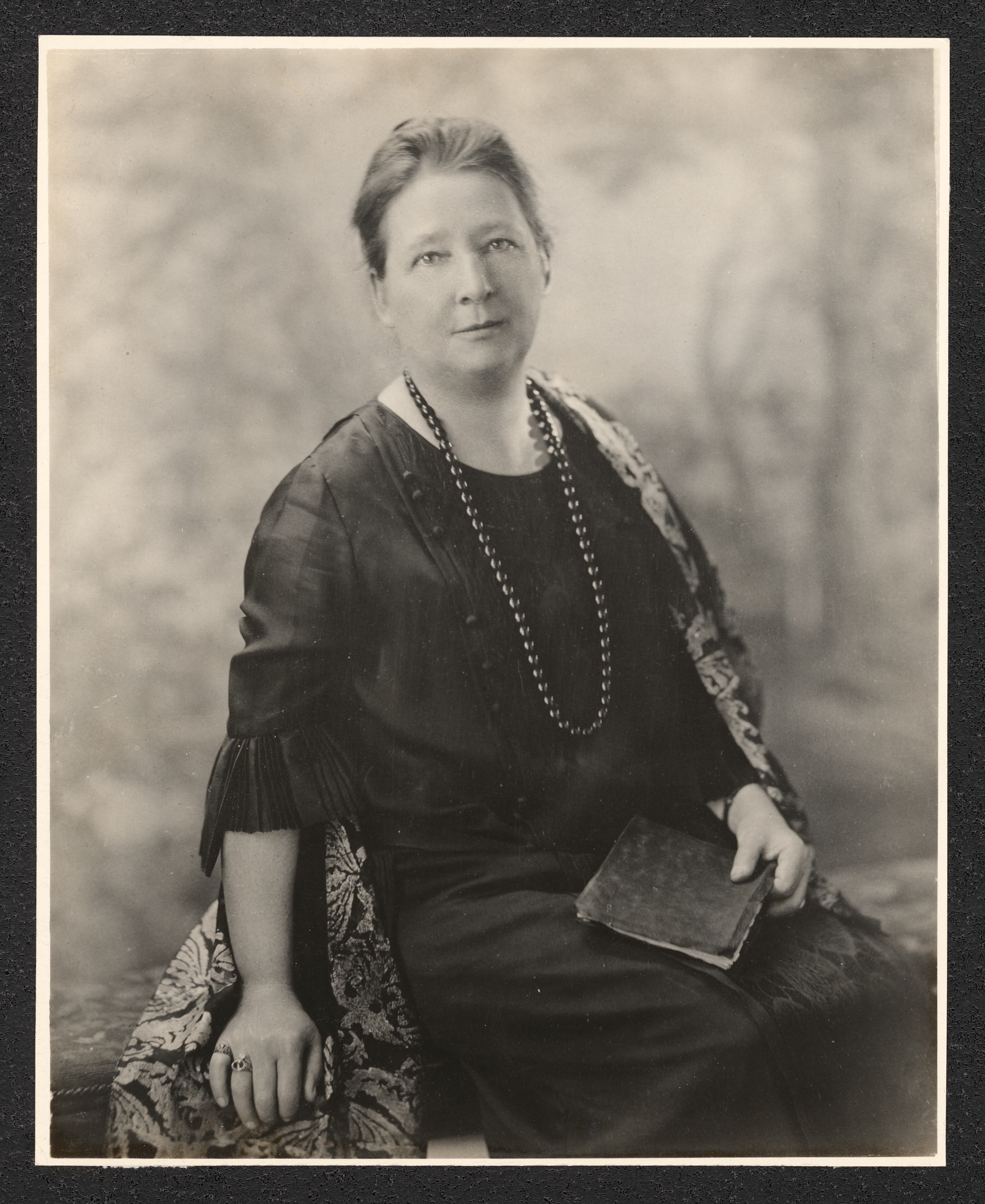
- Bissell in 1907
- Born: May 31, 1861; Wilmington, Delaware, U.S.
- Died: March 8, 1948
- Occupations: Writer and charitable worker
- Writing career
- Pen name: Priscilla Leonard
- Language: English

Emily Perkins Bissell (May 31, 1861 – March 8, 1948) was an American social worker and activist, best remembered for introducing Christmas Seals to the United States.

Born in Wilmington, Delaware, she made a name for herself at a young age as the founder of that city's first public kindergarten and for her efforts to introduce child labor laws in that state. In 1883, she founded an organization, now known as the West End Neighborhood House that originally provided social services to Wilmington's immigrant Irish and German families. Bissell wrote under the pseudonym Priscilla Leonard.

== Anti-suffragism ==
Bissell was closely identified with the anti-suffragist movement. She wrote "The vote is part of man's work. Ballot-box, cartridge box, jury box, sentry box all go together in his part of life. Women cannot step in and take the responsibilities and duties of voting with assuming his place very largely".

In 1896 Bissell published an essay called "The Mistaken Vocation of Shakespeare's Heroines", taking the form of a report of a lecture to suffragettes. The purported speaker launches an attack on the Elizabethan playwright Shakespeare for placing his female characters in unsuitable situations, where they are not allowed to demonstrate their true abilities. For example, instead of having Ophelia as his wife, Hamlet would have been much better served by the more forceful Lady Macbeth, while Macbeth himself would have been better served by Portia. The audience greets her attack on Shakespeare with delight, ending up shouting "Down with Shakespeare!" The spoof was supposed to show that it was absurd for women to seek careers.

In 1900, she testified before the United States Senate Committee on Woman's Suffrage, arguing that women had no place in politics. In March 1903 she addressed a packed meeting in Concord, New Hampshire speaking against a proposed amendment to the state constitution that would strike out the word "male" from the suffrage clause. The amendment failed to pass.

== Christmas seals ==
Several years later, in 1907, she was drawn to the cause of helping people with tuberculosis (TB). She had already heard of an idea in Denmark in which people attached a special stamp to their mail, the proceeds of which would go to fight the disease, and decided to introduce the same idea in Delaware. Her goal was to raise $300 for a local sanitarium, using a bright red stamp she designed herself, and convinced local post offices to sell them for just 1 cent. This way, she believed, even the poorest people could help in the fight against TB.

Though the idea failed at first, Bissell was able to gain enough publicity from a Philadelphia newspaper to make $3,000 for the National Tuberculosis Association, ten times the amount she originally hoped to get. People were intrigued by the idea of Christmas seals, and the following year, Howard Pyle, a notable illustrator from Wilmington, donated the design of the second stamp.

Bissell spent the remainder of her life promoting Christmas stamps and helping to eliminate tuberculosis.

== Death and legacy ==
In 1980 the U.S. Postal Service issued a commemorative stamp in honor of Emily Bissell

She died on March 8, 1948. An abandoned public hospital outside Wilmington bears her name. In 1980, on the 119th anniversary of her birth, the U.S. Postal Service issued a 15 cent stamp in her honor.

== See also ==
- Leigh Mitchell Hodges
- Einar Holbøll, — Founder of the world's first Christmas seals
- Clara Barton — American Civil War nurse; founder of the American Red Cross
