= Ernest Bicknell =

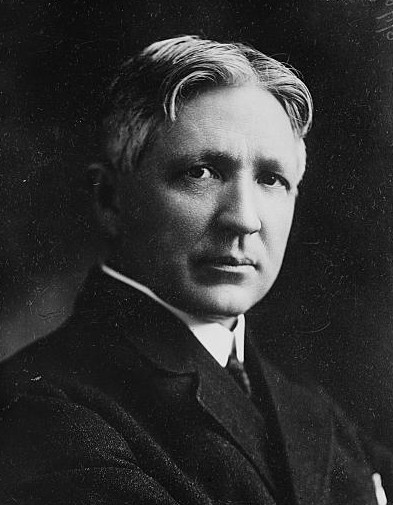
- Burial place: Crown Hill Cemetery and Aboretum, Section 39, Lot 584

Ernest P. Bicknell (February 23, 1862 - 1935) was an important figure in the American

Red Cross in the early part of the 20th century and Director General of the League of Red Cross Societies from 1926 to 1927.
