= Green's Christmas seal catalog =

Philatelic catalogue by Dick Green

Green's Catalog of the Tuberculosis Seals, US National Christmas Seals is a seminal philatelic catalog written by Dick Green, a pioneer member of The Christmas Seal & Charity Stamp Society. Green began his work in the 1920s and portions first appeared as a series in The Western Stamp Collector, a stamp collecting weekly. In 1936 Green's TB Christmas Seal Catalog of the World was published by the Christmas Seal & Charity Stamp Society.

The Catalog is divided into three sections, US National TB Christmas Seals, US Local TB Christmas Seals, and Foreign TB Christmas Seals. Still in print, and greatly expanded; over the years, many volunteer editors have contributed to Green's work.

Green was one of several philatelists in the 1920s listing Christmas Seals. Dorsey F. Wheless, and W.L. Kinkead were cataloging US National Christmas Seals for Scott's Monthly Stamp Journal in 1928. Their work was first incorporated into Scott's Specialized Catalogue of US Postage Stamps in 1935.

== Sources ==
- The Christmas Seal Catalog (PDF). The Christmas Seal and Charity Stamp Society. 2014. "The Christmas Seal Catalog is a simplified version of Green's Catalog of TB Seals of the World, part 1, U.S. National Christmas Seals."
- Green, Dick (1946) [1936-1937]. Green's catalog of the tuberculosis seals of the world (revised through 1946) Pt. 1-3.
