= Trevor (disambiguation) =

Trevor is a male name from Welsh origin meaning "of the large homestead/settlement".

Trevor may also refer to:

== Places ==
=== United States ===
- Trevor, Wisconsin

=== Wales, UK ===
- Trevor, Wrexham
  - Trevor Basin, a canal basin
  - Trevor railway station
- Trefor, Gwynedd
- Trefor, Anglesey

== People ==
- Baron Trevor, three titles, two of them extinct
- Glen Trevor, pen name of James Hilton (1900–1954)

== Other meanings ==
- Trevor (film), 1994 award-winning short film
- Trevor: The Musical, musical adaptation of the 1994 film
- "Trevor" (The X-Files), an episode of the television series The X-Files
- Trevor disease, a bone development disorder
- Trevor, a trout statue in Gore, New Zealand

== See also ==
- The Trevor Project, toll-free suicide prevention helpline aimed at gay and questioning youth in the United States, inspired by the film
- Trefor (disambiguation)
- Trevorrow
