= Trevor =

- Gender: Male

Origin
- Languages: Welsh, Cornish, Irish
- Meaning: "of the large homestead/settlement"

Trevor (Trefor in the Welsh language) is a common given name or surname of Welsh origin. It is an habitational name, deriving from the Welsh tre(f), meaning "homestead", or "settlement" and fawr, meaning "large, big". The Cornish language equivalent is Trevorrow and is most associated with Ludgvan.

Trevor is also a reduced Anglicized form of the Gaelic Ó Treabhair (descendant of Treabhar), which may derive from the original Welsh name.

== Given name ==
=== People ===
- Trevor Ariza (born 1985), American basketball player
- Trevor Bailey, English cricketer
- Trevor Bauer, American baseball player
- Trevor Bayne, NASCAR driver
- Trevor Baylis (1937–2018), British inventor
- Trevor Bayliss, Australian cricket coach
- Trevor Berbick, boxer
- Trevor Bigham, policeman
- Trevor Bolder, British musician, bassist for Uriah Heep
- Trevor Brooking, English footballer
- Trevor Cahill, baseball player
- Trevor Chappell, Australian cricketer
- Trevor Chinn (born 1935), British businessman and philanthropist
- Trevor Chinn (glaciologist) (c.1937–2018), New Zealand scientist
- Trevor Christensen (born 1993), American DJ
- Trevor Christie (born 1959), English footballer
- Trevor Daley, hockey player
- Trevor Daniel (American football) (born 1994), American football player
- Trevor Daniel (singer) (born 1994), American singer
- Trevor Dawson, arms manufacturer
- Trevor Denbow (born 1998), American football player
- Trevor Denman, Thoroughbred race track announcer, sportscaster
- Trevor Devall, actor
- Trevor Dunn, American bassist (Mr. Bungle) and composer
- Trevor Engelson (born 1976), American film producer
- Trevor Erhardt (born 1962), Canadian ice hockey player
- Trevor Etienne (born 2004), American football player
- Trevor Eve, actor
- Trevor Foster, Welsh rugby footballer
- Trevor Francis, English footballer
- Trevor Gaskins, Panamaian basketball player
- Trevor Gleeson, Australian basketball coach
- Trevor Guthrie (born 1973), Canadian singer and songwriter
- Trevor Haddon, British artist and illustrator
- Trevor Hauver (born 1998), American baseball player
- Trevor Henry, New Zealand judge
- Trevor Hill, 1st Viscount Hillsborough
- Trevor Hockey, Welsh footballer
- Trevor Hoffman, baseball player
- Trevor Horn, English musician
- Trevor Howard, actor
- Trevor Huddleston, Anglican priest and anti-apartheid activist
- Trevor Hudgins (born 1999), American basketball player
- Trevor Hurst, Canadian singer, vocalist for Econoline Crush
- Trevor Jacob, American snowboarder and YouTuber
- Trevor Jacobs (footballer), English footballer
- Trevor Jacobs (politician), American politician
- Trevor James (disambiguation), various people
- Trevor Jones (disambiguation), various people
- Trevor Keegan (born 2000), American football player
- Trevor Keels (born 2003), American basketball player
- Trevor Kidd, hockey player
- Trevor Kirczenow (born 1985), Canadian health researcher and advocate
- Trevor Knight, American football player
- Trevor Lane, American professional baseball player
- Trevor Lauck (born 2004), American football player
- Trevor Lawrence (born 1999), American football player
- Sir Trevor Lawrence, 2nd Baronet
- Trevor Letowski, hockey player
- Trevor Oswin Lewis, 4th Baron Merthyr
- Trevor Lewis, hockey player
- Trevor Linden, hockey player
- Trevor Lock, comedian
- Trevor Lucas, spoken word artist
- Trevor Mallard, New Zealand politician and Cabinet minister
- Trevor Manuel, South African politician and economist
- Sir Trevor McDonald (born 1939), Trinidadian-British newscaster journalist
- Trevor McDonald (baseball) (born 2001), American baseball player
- Trevor Milton (born 1981/1982), American billionaire, CEO and co-founder of Nikola Motor Company
- Trevor Moore (disambiguation), various people
- Trevor Murdoch, wrestler
- Trevor Neal, of British comedy duo Trevor and Simon
- Trevor Nelson, British DJ
- Trevor Noah, South African comedian and presenter
- Sir Trevor Nunn, theatre and film director
- Trevor Ogilvie-Grant, 4th Baron Strathspey (1879–1948), member of the House of Lords
- Trevor Olavae (born 1959), Solomon Islands politician
- Trevor Phillips (born 1953), British politician
- Trevor Pinnock (born 1946), English conductor and harpsichordist
- Trevor Plouffe, baseball player
- Trevor Prescod, Barbadian politician
- Trevor Pryce (born 1975), American football player
- Trevor Rabin, South African guitarist, rock group Yes
- Trevor Read (born 1980), Canadian ice hockey defenceman
- Trevor Rees-Jones (businessman), American billionaire
- Trevor Rees-Jones (bodyguard), bodyguard and sole survivor of the car crash that killed Diana, Princess of Wales
- Trevor Reid (1908–1965), English actor
- Trevor Reid (gridiron football) (born 2000), American football player
- Trevor Reilly (born 1988), American football player
- Trevor Roach (born 1992), American football player
- Trevor Robbins (born 1949), English neuroscientist
- Trevor Roberts, 2nd Baron Clwyd
- Trevor Rosenthal (born 1990), baseball player
- Trevor St. John, American actor
- Trevor Segstro (born 1978), Canadian ice hockey player
- Trevor Semper, Montserratian cricketer
- Trevor Siemian, American football player
- Trevor Skeet, Conservative MP
- Trevor Smith (disambiguation), various people
- Trevor Soar (born 1956), retired Royal Navy admiral
- Trevor Spring, gentleman cricketer and army officer
- Trevor Stamp, 3rd Baron Stamp FRCPath
- Trevor Stamp, 4th Baron Stamp FRCP
- Trevor Steven, English footballer
- Trevor Story, American baseball player
- Trevor van Riemsdyk, American ice hockey player
- Trevor Wallace, American comedian
- Trevor Williams (disambiguation)
- Trevor Wilson (basketball) (born 1968), American basketball player
- K. Trevor Wilson (born 1981), Canadian comedian, writer, and actor
- Trevor Wright, American actor
- Trevor Żahra, Maltese novelist, poet and illustrator
- Trevor Zegras, American ice hockey player
- Trevor Zinck (born 1970), Canadian politician

=== Animals ===
- Trevor (duck) (died 2019), a mallard duck in Niue

=== Fictional characters ===
- Trevor, titular protagonist of the 1994 short film of the same name
- Trev or Trevor, a series of minor characters created by New Zealand-Australian satirist John Clarke, part of his Fred Dagg persona
- Trevor, a demon character in The Good Place TV series
- Trevor, Neville Longbottom's pet toad in the Harry Potter series
- Trevor, titular protagonist of Trevor: The Musical
- Trevor the Traction Engine in The Railway Series children's books
- Trevor Belmont, in the Castlevania game series
- Trevor Joseph Brennan/Bauer, main character in the romantic suspense series Countermeasure
- Trevor Evans, childhood of Mike Ross in U.S. TV series Suits
- Trevor Fitzroy, a Marvel Comics supervillain
- Trevor Goodchild, antagonist in the Æon Flux franchise
- Trevor Hale, main character of the TV show Cupid
- D.S. Trevor Hands in the British crime drama television series M.I.T.: Murder Investigation Team
- Trevor Jordache in the Channel 4 soap opera Brookside
- Trevor Langan, a recurring character and criminal defense attorney in the US TV series Law and Order: Special Victims Unit
- Trevor Lefkowitz, one of the main characters in the CBS series Ghosts
- Trevor McKinney, protagonist in the film Pay It Forward
- Trevor Morgan in the BBC soap opera EastEnders
- Trevor Ockmonick in the 1980's TV show ALF
- Trevor Philips, a protagonist in Grand Theft Auto V
- Trevor Reznik, main character of the movie The Machinist
- Trevor Slattery, in the Marvel Cinematic Universe
- Trevor Spacey, one of the playable characters in Metal Slug 4
- Trevor Spengler, a ghostbuster, one of the main characters on the film Ghostbusters: Afterlife and Ghostbusters: Frozen Empire
- Trevor's Treasure Tracker, strip cartoon about boy named Trevor in Whoopee! comics
- Trevor Troublemeyer, one of the main characters in the Canadian animated series Sidekick

== Surname ==
=== People ===
- Claire Trevor (1910–2000), American actress
- Hugh Trevor (1903–1933), American actor
- John Trevor (disambiguation), various people
- William Trevor (1928–2016), Irish writer
- William Spottiswoode Trevor (1831–1907), British recipient of the Victoria Cross

=== Fictional characters ===
- Steve Trevor, love interest of Wonder Woman

== See also ==
- List of Irish-language given names
- List of Scottish Gaelic given names
- Horace Trevor-Cox (1908–2005), Conservative MP who later joined Labour
- Hugh Trevor-Roper, Lord Dacre (1914–2003), British historian
