= John Trevor =

John Trevor may refer to:

== Religion ==
- John Trevor (died 1357), Bishop of St Asaph
- John Trevor (died 1410), Bishop of St Asaph
- John Trevor (Unitarian minister) (1855–1930), Unitarian minister who formed The Labour Church

== Politicians ==
- Sir John Trevor (1563–1630), MP and Surveyor of the Queen's Ships
- Sir John Trevor (1596–1673), his son, MP from 1620, member of the Council of State during the Protectorate
- Sir John Trevor (1626–1672), his son, Secretary of State for the Northern Department during the 17th century
- Sir John Trevor (speaker) (1637–1717), Speaker of the House of Commons and Master of the Rolls in the late 17th and 18th centuries
- John Morley Trevor (the elder) (1681–1719), grandson of the Secretary of State for the Northern Department, MP for Lewes and Sussex
- John Morley Trevor (the younger) (1717–1743), son of the above, MP for Lewes
- John Trevor, 3rd Viscount Hampden (1748–1824), 18th century British diplomatist
- John B. Trevor (Pennsylvania politician), Pennsylvania State Treasurer

== Others ==
- John Bond Trevor (1822-1890), American financer and Wall Street pioneer
- John B. Trevor Sr. (1878–1956), American lawyer and immigration reformer
- John B. Trevor Jr. (1909–2006), electrical engineer and author
