= Adirondack Cottage Sanitarium =

Historic place in New York, United States

- Trudeau Sanatorium
- U.S. National Register of Historic Places
- U.S. Historic district
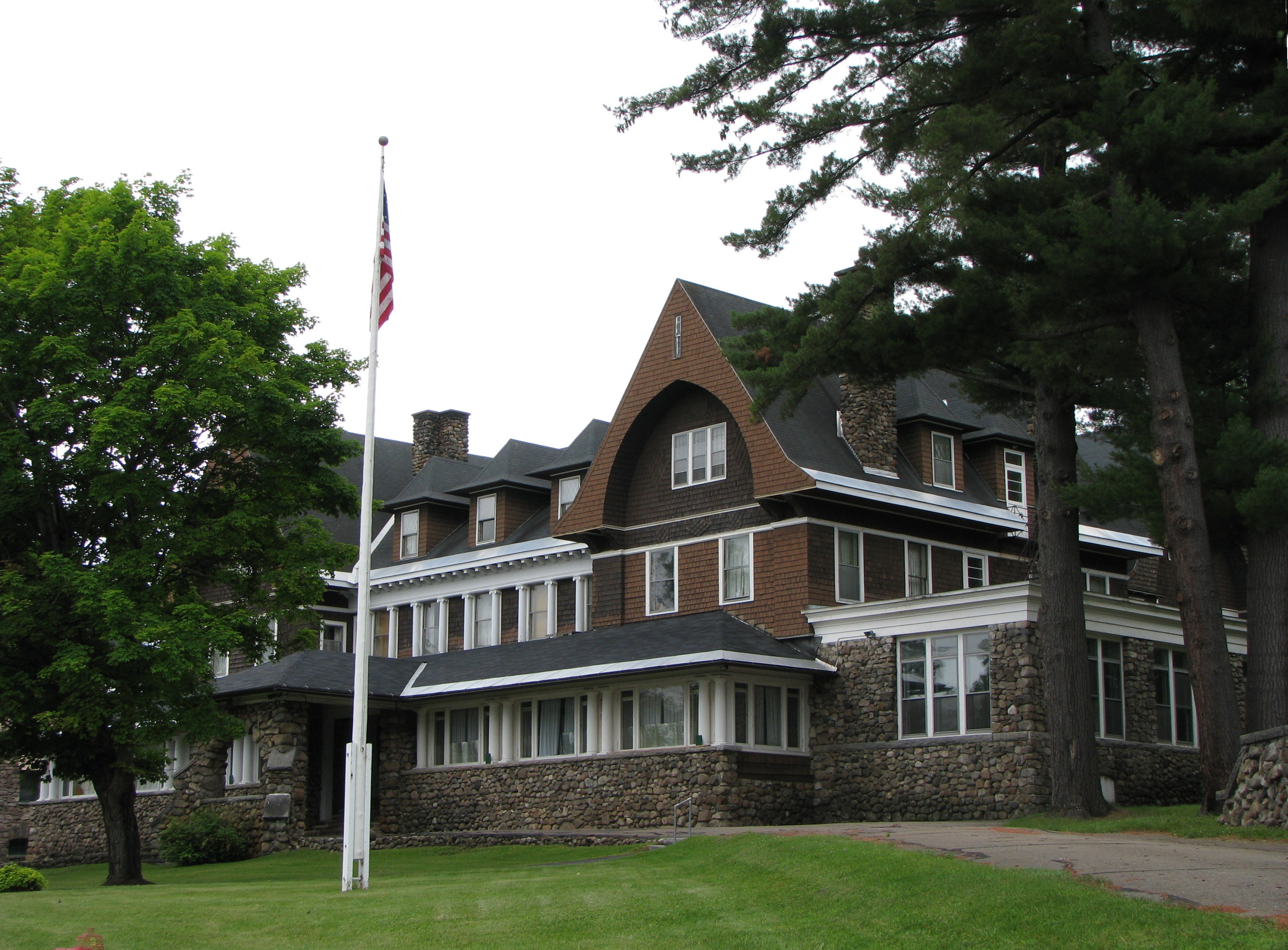
- The Administration Building

- Location within New York Location within the United States
- Nearest city: Saranac Lake, New York
- Coordinates: 44°20′31″N 74°7′21″W
- Architects: Coulter, W. L.; et al.
- Architectural style: Late Victorian, Late 19th And 20th Century Revivals
- MPS: Saranac Lake MPS
- NRHP reference No.: 95000479
- Added to NRHP: April 20, 1995

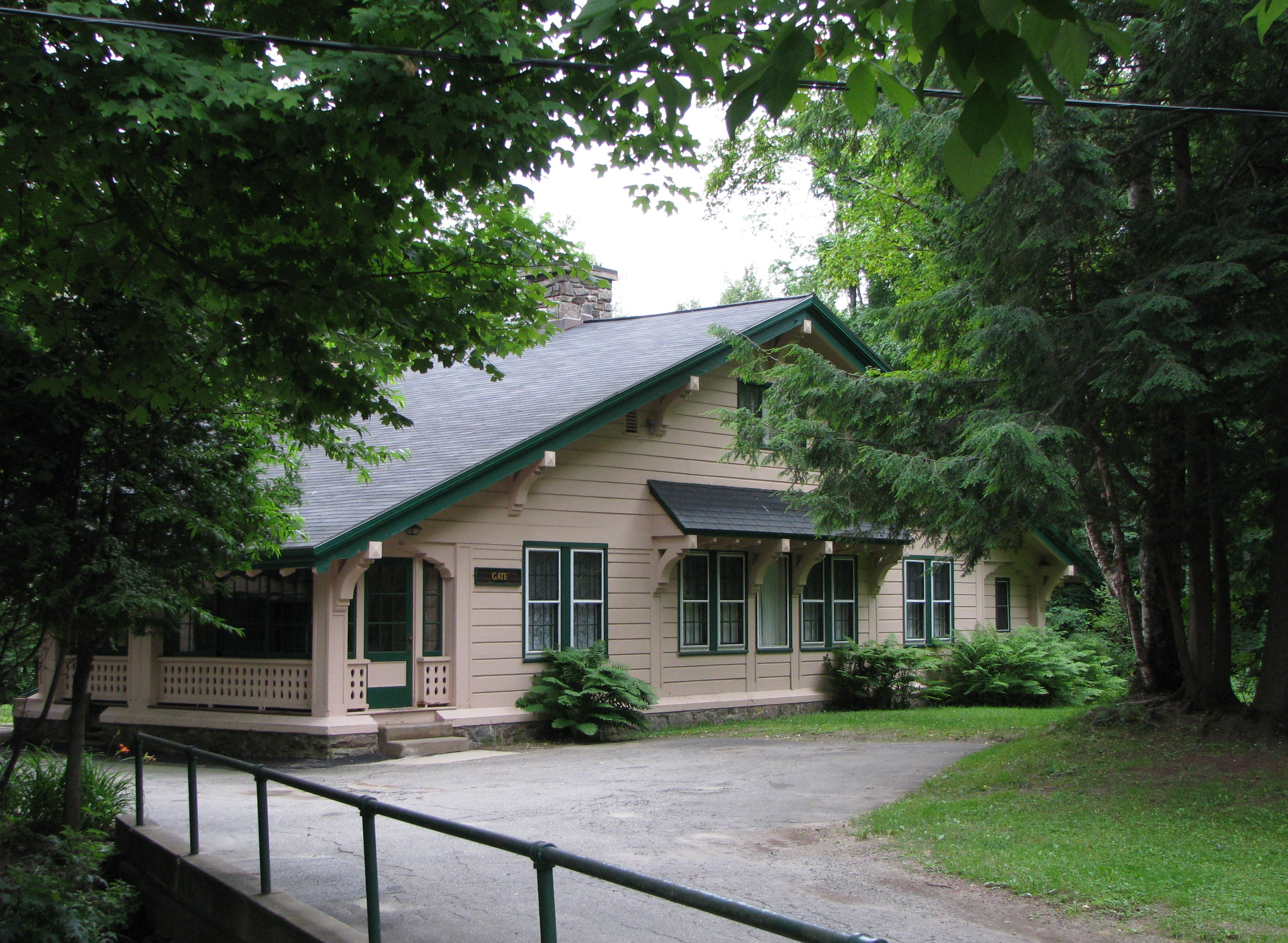
The Gatehouse

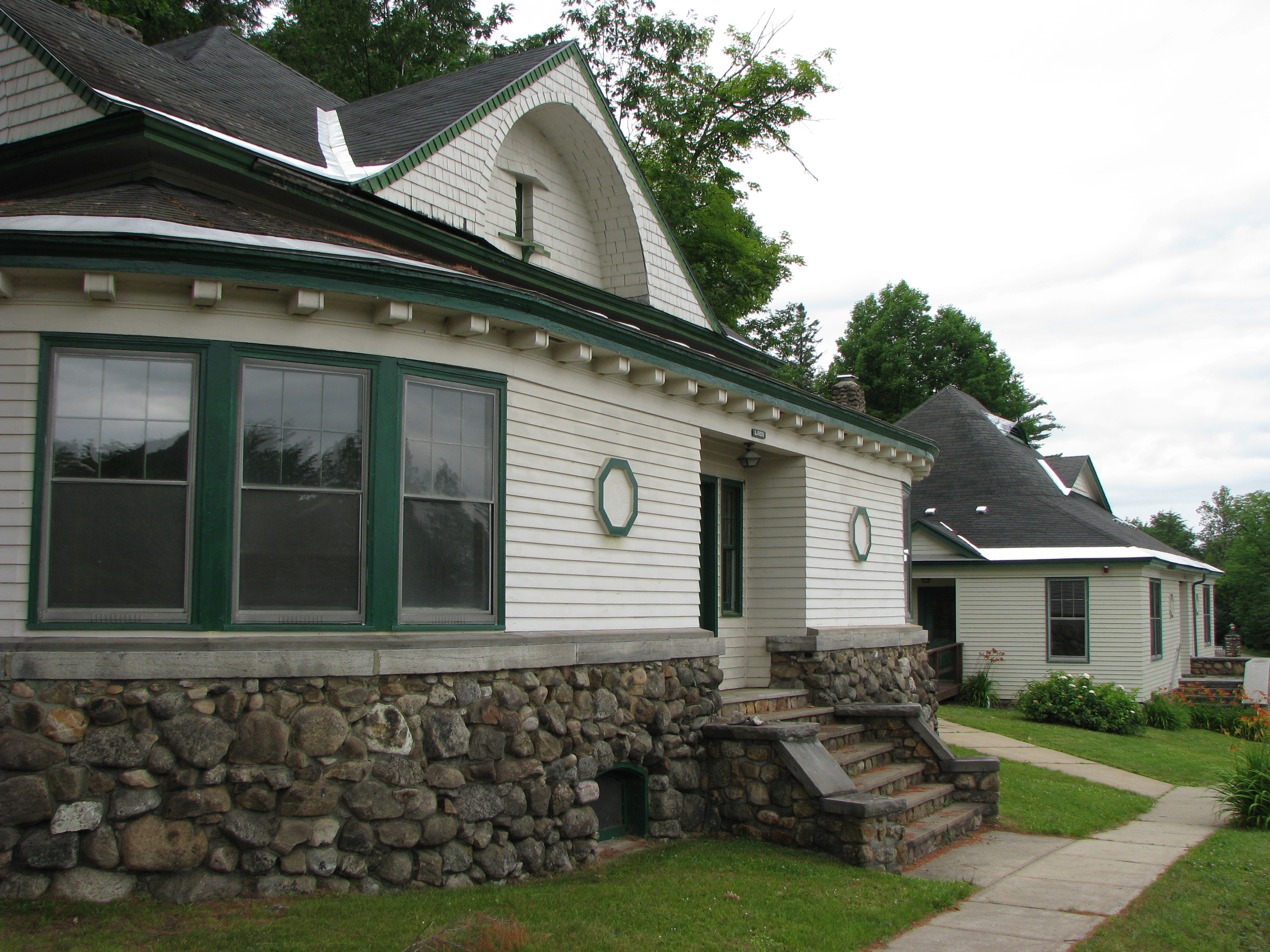
Two of the early Cure Cottages. Originally the first-floor porches were open; they were closed in by the American Management Association after the sanatorium had closed

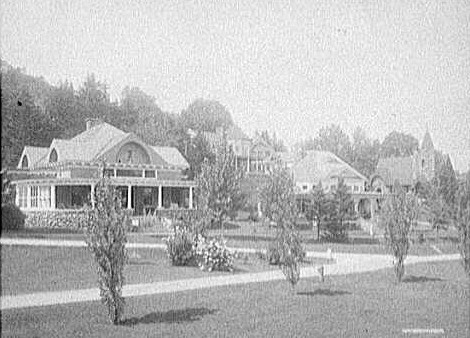
1906 view of the chapel and cure cottages shown above

The Adirondack Cottage Sanitarium was a tuberculosis sanatorium established in Saranac Lake, New York, in 1885 by Dr. Edward Livingston Trudeau. After Trudeau's death in 1915, the institution's name was changed to the Trudeau Sanatorium, following changes in conventional usage. The sanitarium, including its cure cottages, was listed on the National Register of Historic Places in 1995.

== Early history ==
Trudeau was born in 1848 in New York City to a family of physicians. During his late teens, his elder brother James contracted tuberculosis and Edward nursed him until his death three months later. At twenty, he enrolled in the College of Physicians and Surgeons at Columbia University (then Columbia College), completing his medical training in 1871. He was diagnosed with tuberculosis in 1873. Following conventional thinking of the times, he went to live in the Adirondack Mountains, seeking a change of climate. He spent as much time as possible in the open and subsequently regained his health. In 1876 he moved to Saranac Lake and established a small medical practice.

In 1882, Trudeau read about Prussian Dr. Hermann Brehmer's success treating tuberculosis with the "rest cure" in cold, clear mountain air. Following this example, Trudeau founded the Adirondack Cottage Sanitarium in February, 1885. The first patients were two sisters who had been factory workers in New York City. They were treated in a one-room cottage named "Little Red", built for $350 on land donated by the guides and residents of the village. As the sanitorium grew, it would be supported at first by wealthy sportsmen that Trudeau had met at nearby Paul Smith's Hotel, several of whom had built great camps on the nearby St. Regis Lakes. Early contributors included John W. Minturn, Anson Phelps Stokes, and Whitelaw Reid.

== Patients ==
Patients included authors Allan Seager, Canadian physician and medical innovator Norman Bethune, and baseball players Larry Doyle and Christy Mathewson.

- Dramatist Rose Franken spent the first ten months of her marriage to Sigmund Franken there in 1913–1914; Sigmund needed treatment.
- Novelist Walker Percy spent several years at the sanitarium in the early 1940s.

== Later years ==
While the sanitarium did not offer its services free-of-charge, it treated poorer patients at less than cost, and fund-raising was a constant concern. Many physicians and staff members served without pay, and in later years Trudeau commented that he had never been able to pay his staff adequately. Like Trudeau himself, a number of physicians and nurses were themselves infected with tuberculosis.

The sanitarium also developed a school for nursing, and later the Trudeau School of Tuberculosis, which offered six-week summer courses for physicians who wished to learn the latest treatment methods for the disease.

In time, far more patients would be drawn to the area than the Sanitarium could handle. Many patients were treated in the small, often family-run, cure cottages that developed in the area to meet the demand. Large sanitoria were built at Ray Brook and Gabriels, and in 1927, the Will Rogers Hospital, the last of the institutional sanatoria, was built in Saranac Lake; it is now an assisted living facility, Saranac Village at Will Rogers.

== Closing ==
The Trudeau Sanatorium closed in 1954, after the discovery of effective antibiotic treatments for tuberculosis. The property was sold by Trudeau's grandson, Dr. Francis B. Trudeau Jr., to the American Management Association in 1957. The proceeds were invested in a new medical research facility, the Trudeau Institute, built on Lower Saranac Lake, which opened in 1964; subsequently Little Red and the Trudeau statue were moved to the new site as memorials. A number of the sanatorium buildings have been torn down, and many more have been badly renovated, but a substantial number are still intact. They are not generally open to the public, but tours are offered by Historic Saranac Lake, a local nonprofit, historic preservation organization.

== Gallery ==
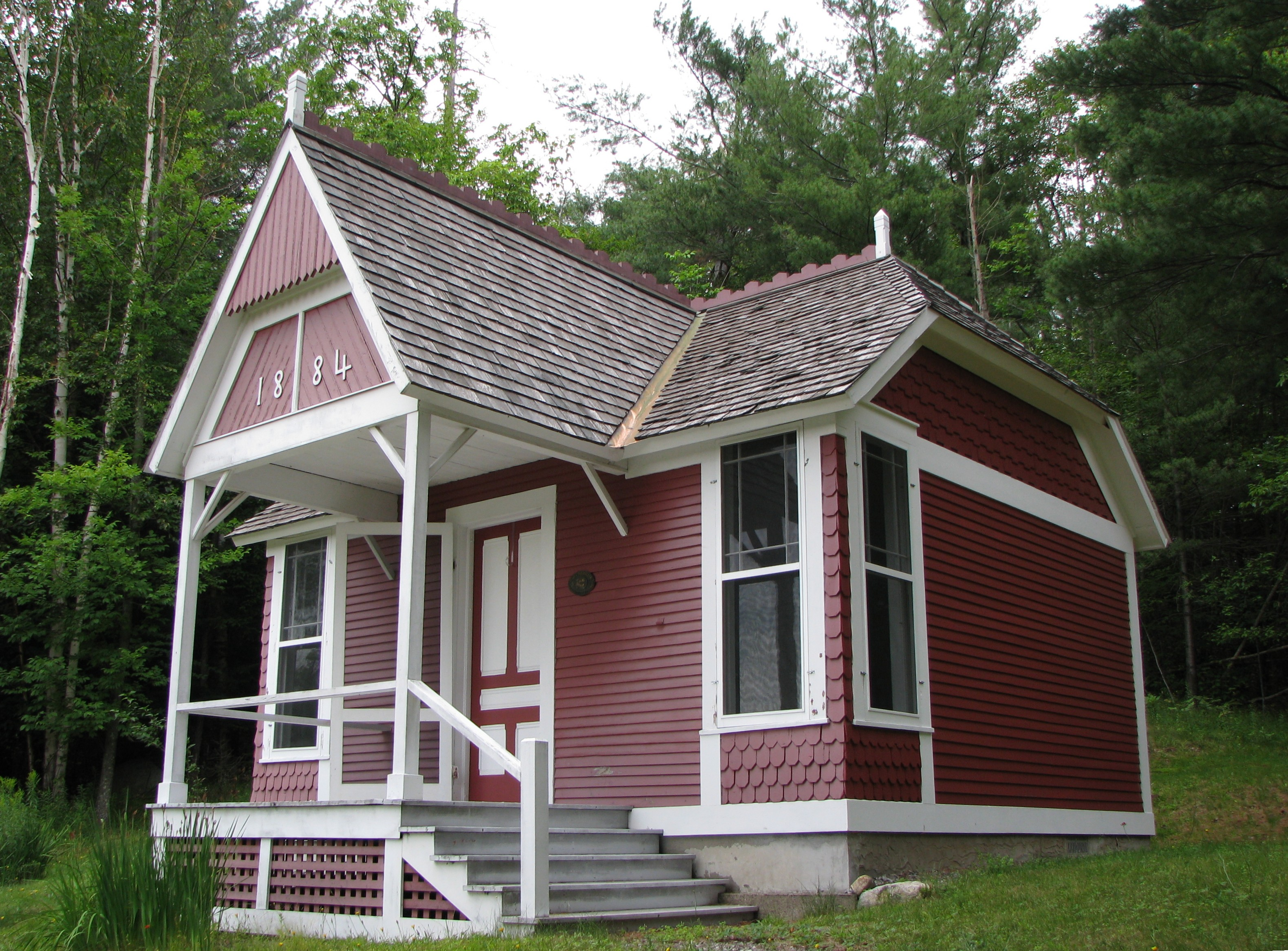
"Little Red"

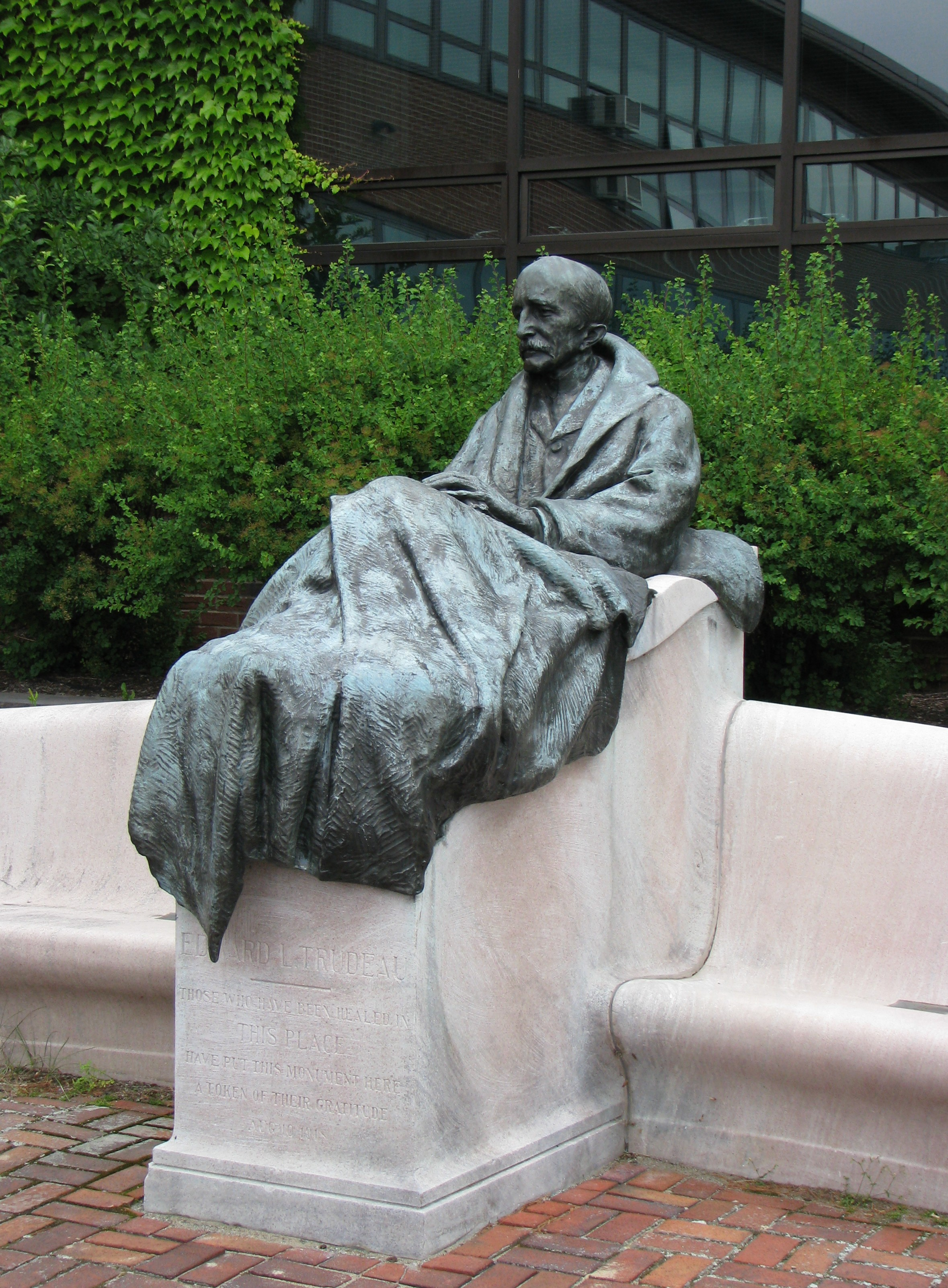
Statue of Dr E L Trudeau, now at the Trudeau Institute

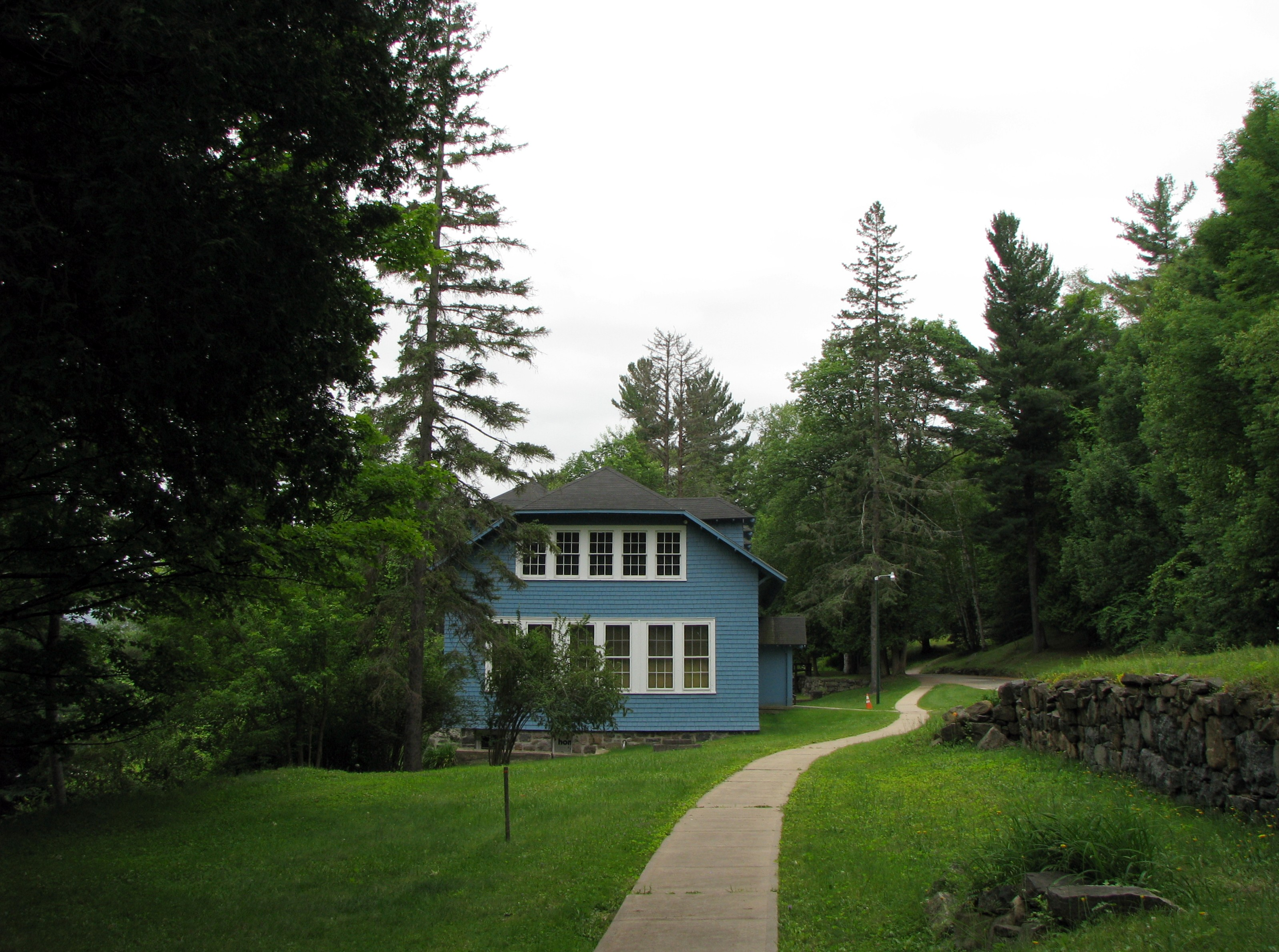
Occupational Therapy Building

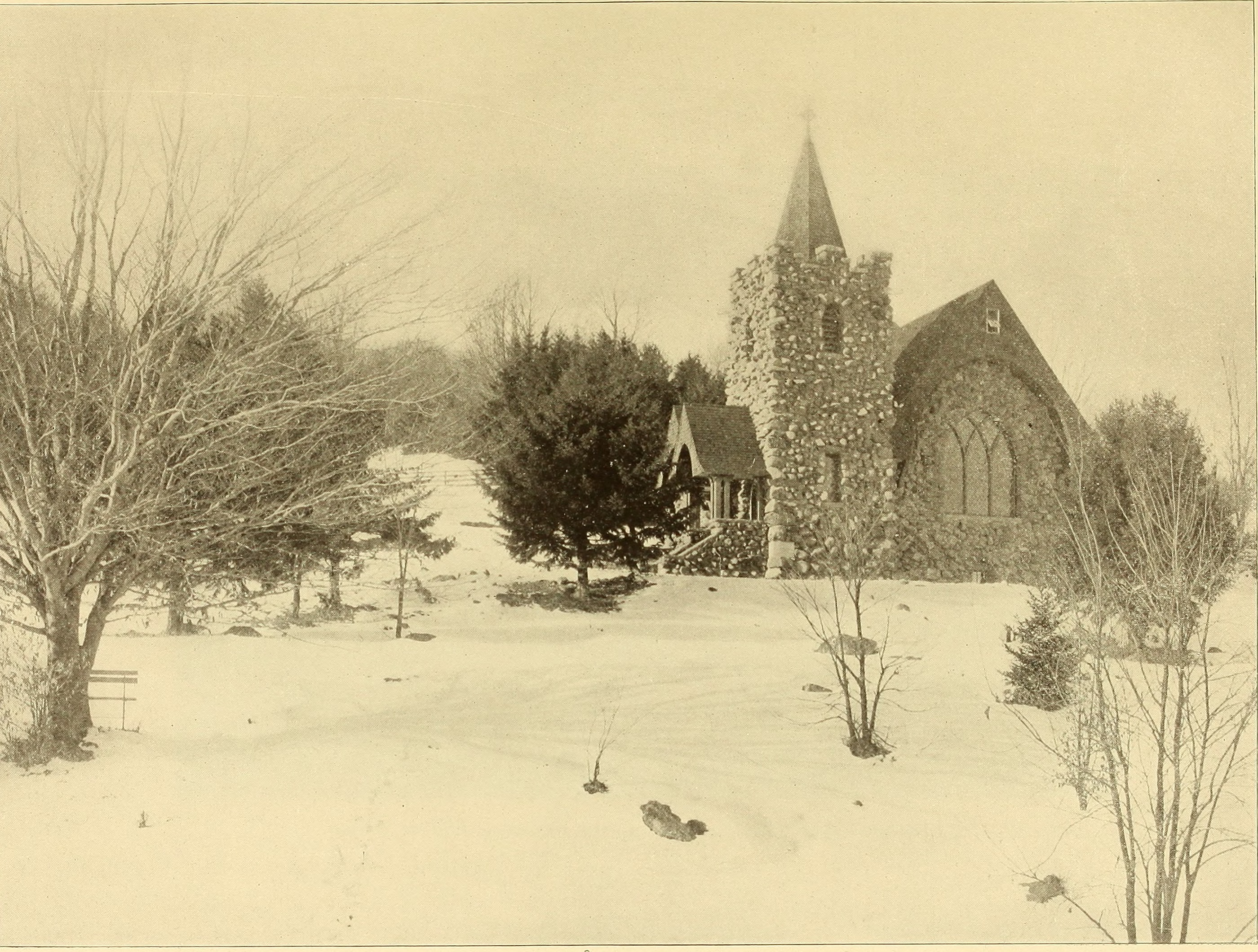
Chapel in the 1890s
