= Trefor =

Trefor may refer to:

== People ==
=== Given name Trefor ===
- Trefor Evans (rugby union) (born 1947), former Wales international rugby union player
- Trefor Jenkins (1932–2025), Welsh-born South African human geneticist
- Trefor Richard Morgan (1914–1970), Welsh nationalist activist and businessman
- Trefor Morris (born 1934), Chief Inspector of Constabulary for England, Wales and Northern Ireland from 1993 to 1996
- Trefor Owen (1933–2001), Welsh amateur footballer
- Trefor Proud (fl. 1989–present), make-up artist in film and television
- Trefor Pugh (fl. 1962, 1965), New Zealand international footballer

=== Surname Trefor ===
- Dafydd Trefor (died 1528?), Welsh cleric and bard
- John Trefor, British television director and producer
- John Trevor (died 1357), Ieuan Trefor in Welsh, first bishop of St Asaph, Wales
- John Trevor (died 1410), Ieuan Trefor in Welsh, Bishop of St Asaph, Wales, and Anti-Bishop of St Andrews in Scotland

== Places ==
=== Places in Wales, UK ===
- Trefor, Anglesey, a hamlet
- Trefor, Gwynedd, a village
- Trevor, Wrexham, a village called Trefor in Welsh

== See also ==
- Trevor (disambiguation)
- Trevorrow
- Trev
