= Church Street Historic District (Saranac Lake, New York) =

Historic district in New York, United States

- U.S. National Register of Historic Places
- U.S. Historic district
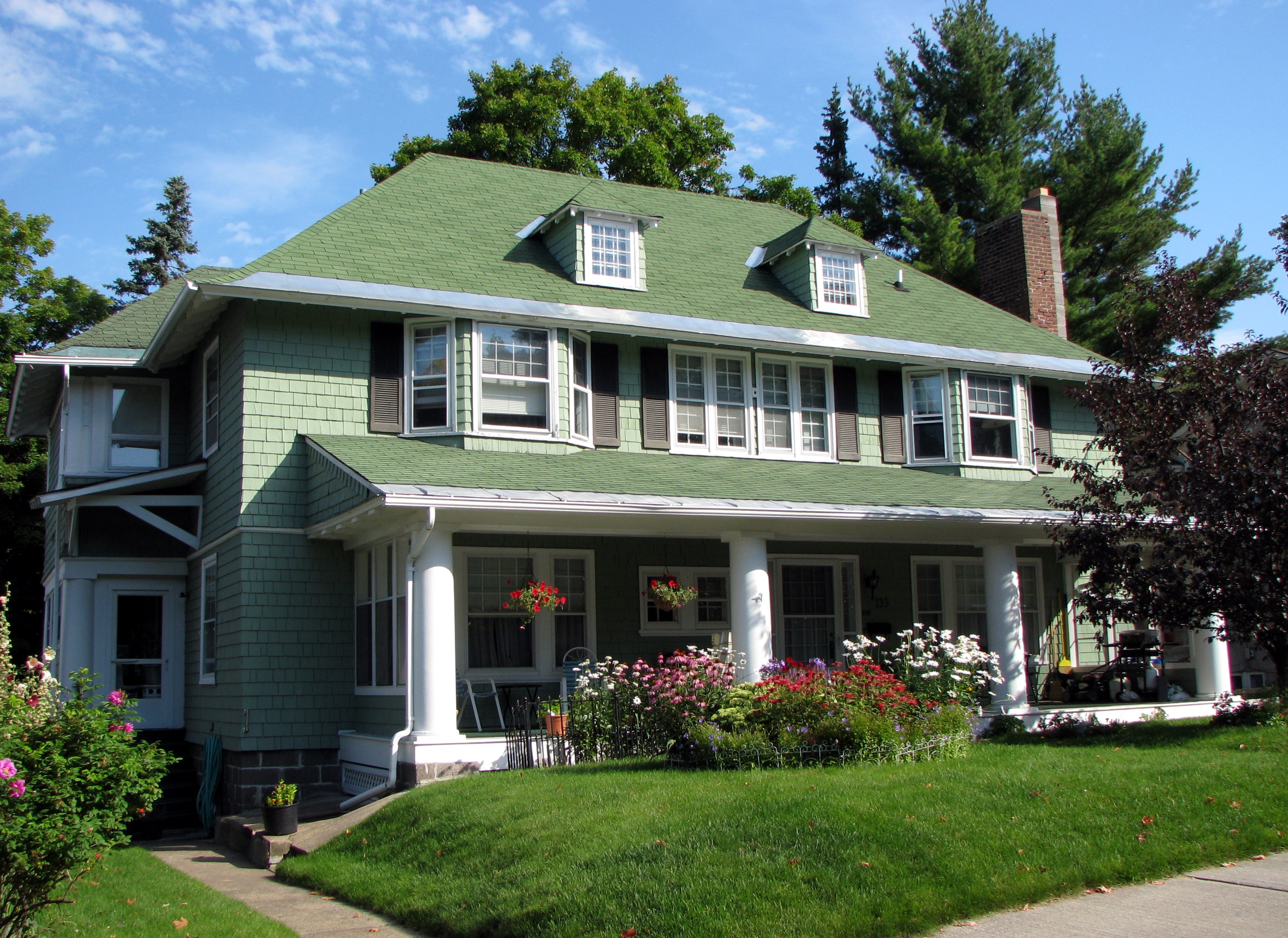
- Dr. Woods Price home

- Location within New York Location within the United States
- Location: Roughly, Church St. from Main St. to St. Bernard St., Saranac Lake, New York
- Coordinates: 44°19′35″N 74°7′47″W
- Area: 5 acres (2.0 ha)
- Architect: Aspinwall, J. Lawrence; Et al.
- Architectural style: Late 19th And 20th Century Revivals, Bungalow/Craftsman, Gothic Revival
- MPS: Saranac Lake MPS
- NRHP reference No.: 92001472
- Added to NRHP: November 6, 1992

The Church Street Historic District is a national historic district located in the village of Saranac Lake (Harrietstown) in Franklin County, New York. The district extends roughly along Church Street from Main Street to St. Bernard Street. It comprises twenty-seven buildings, including three churches, a medical laboratory, ten homes, two libraries, and six cure cottages, most built between the late 1870s and 1900.

Church Street is one of the five original streets of the village, connecting River Street to Main Street. Most of the buildings have features reflecting their use as cure cottages by residents suffering from tuberculosis. Patients sat out on the "cure porches" in order to be exposed daily, year round, to as much fresh air as possible.

It was listed on the National Register of Historic Places in 1992.

== Gallery ==
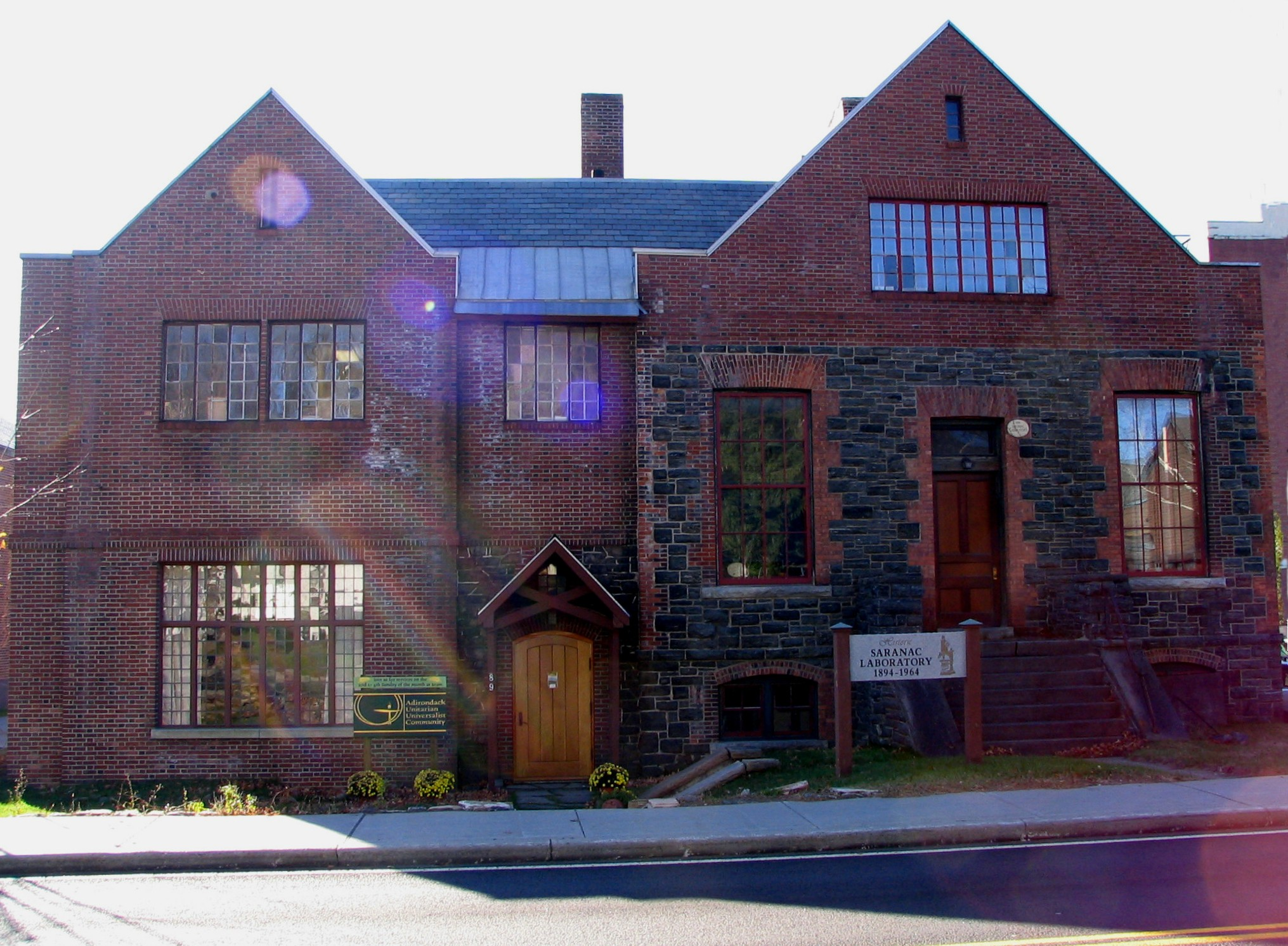
Saranac Laboratory, precursor to the Trudeau Institute. Presently the home of Historic Saranac Lake.

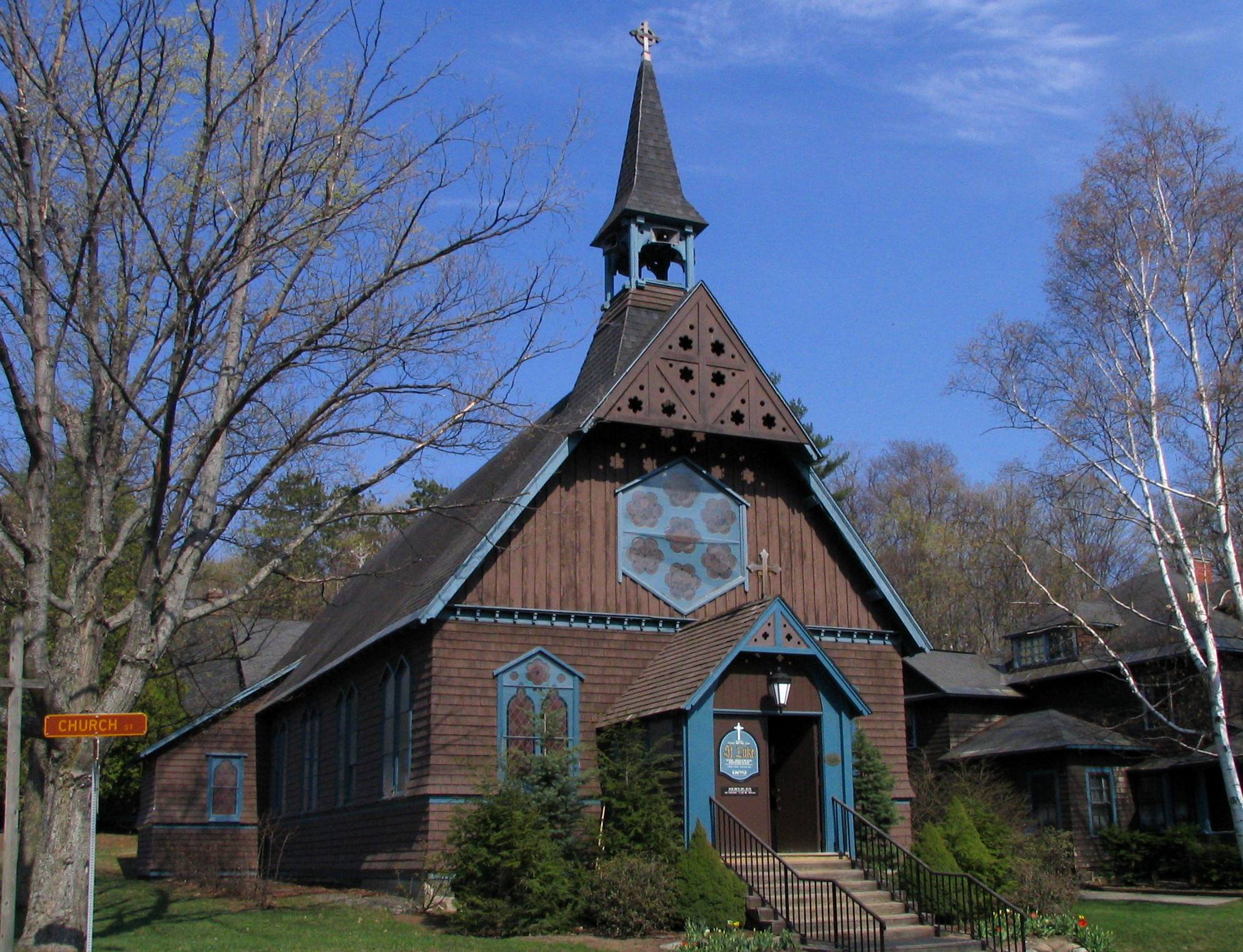
Church of St Luke the Beloved Physician

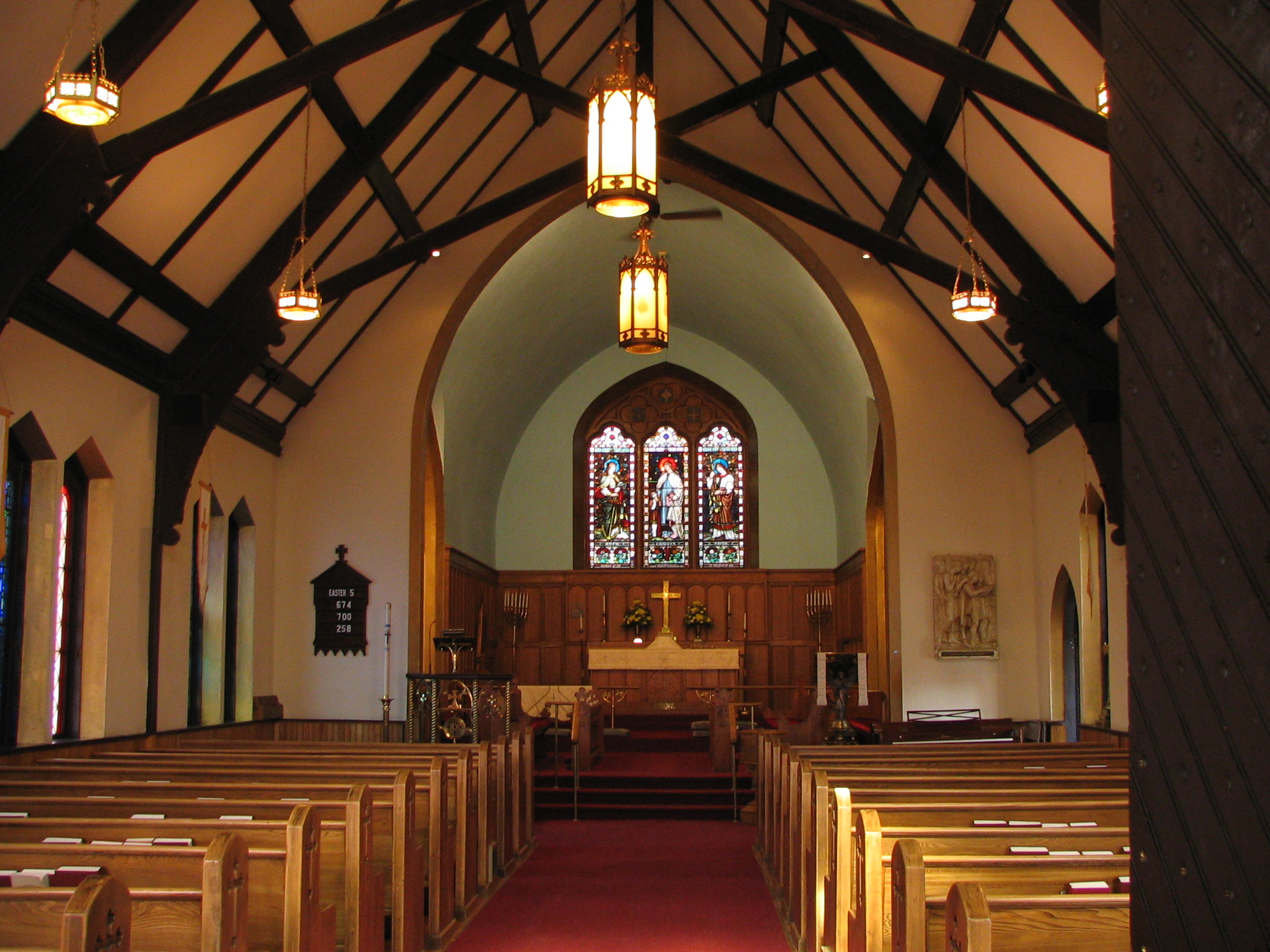
Church of St Luke the Beloved Physician, interior

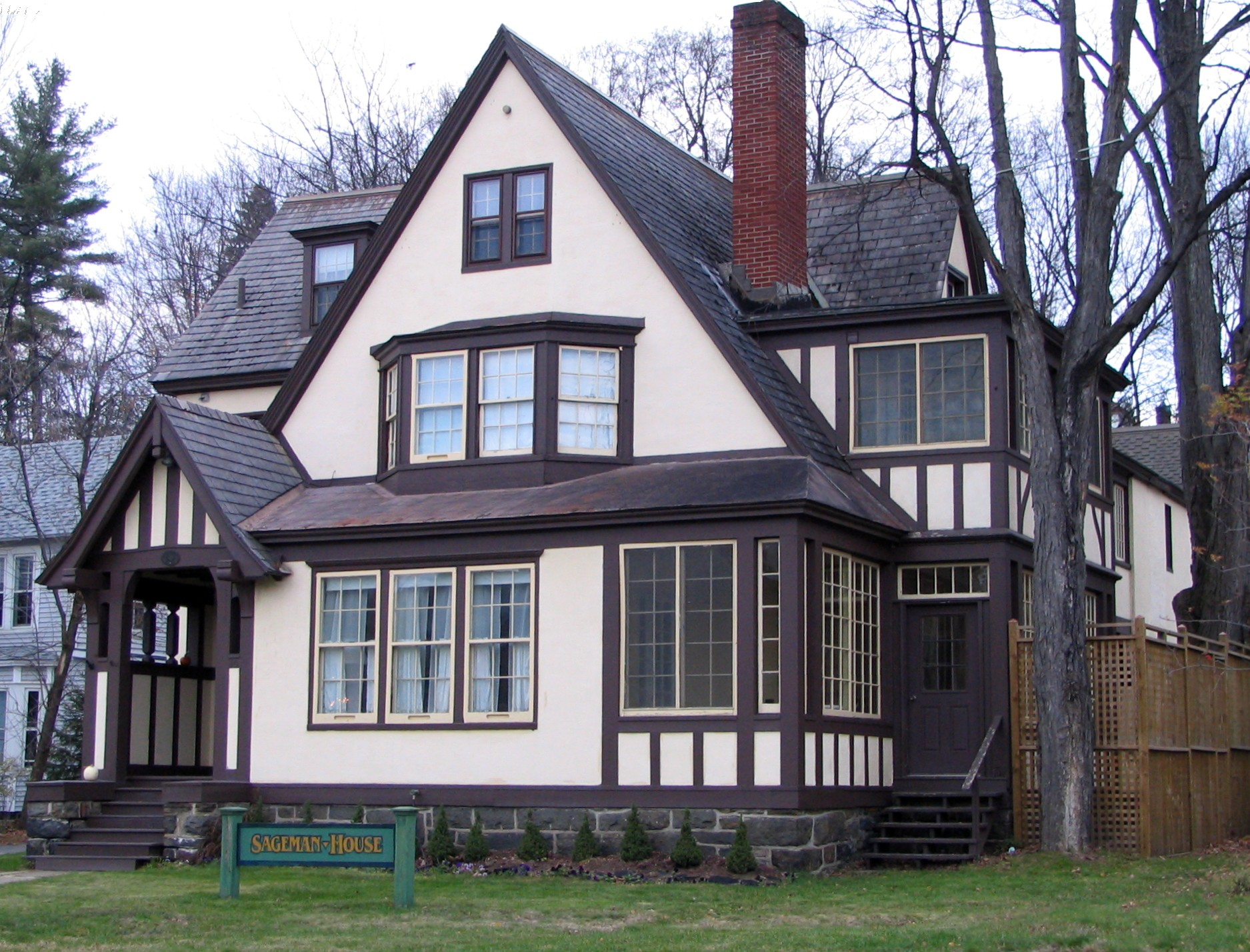
Kinghorn-Sageman House
