= Historic Saranac Lake =

American non-profit organisation

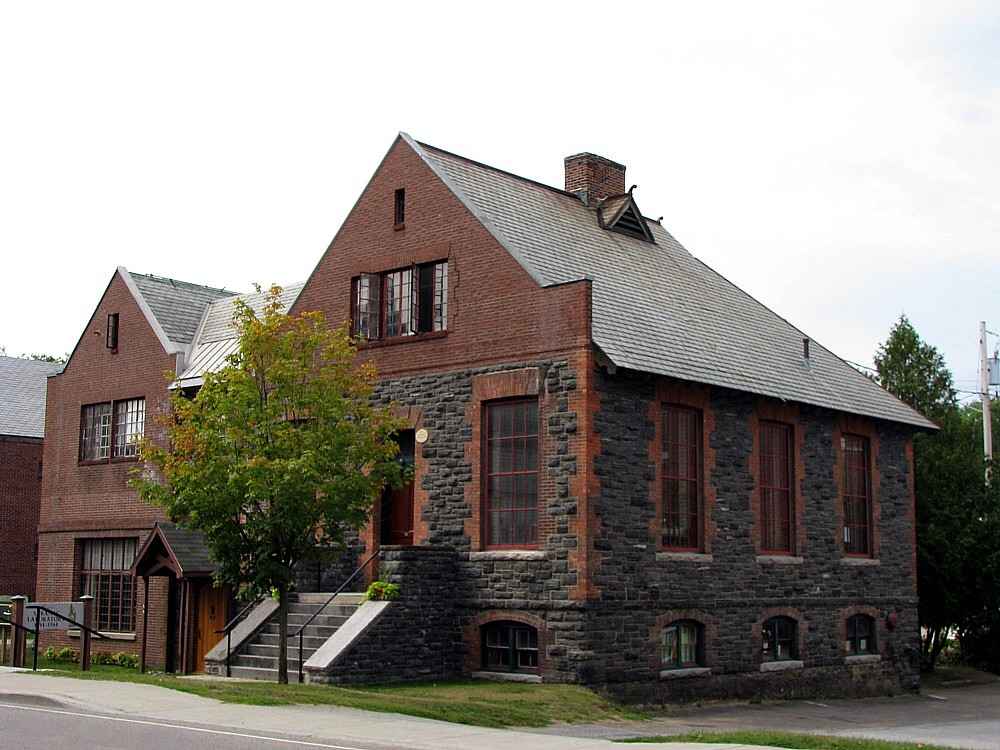
Saranac Laboratory, precursor to the Trudeau Institute. Presently the home of Historic Saranac Lake

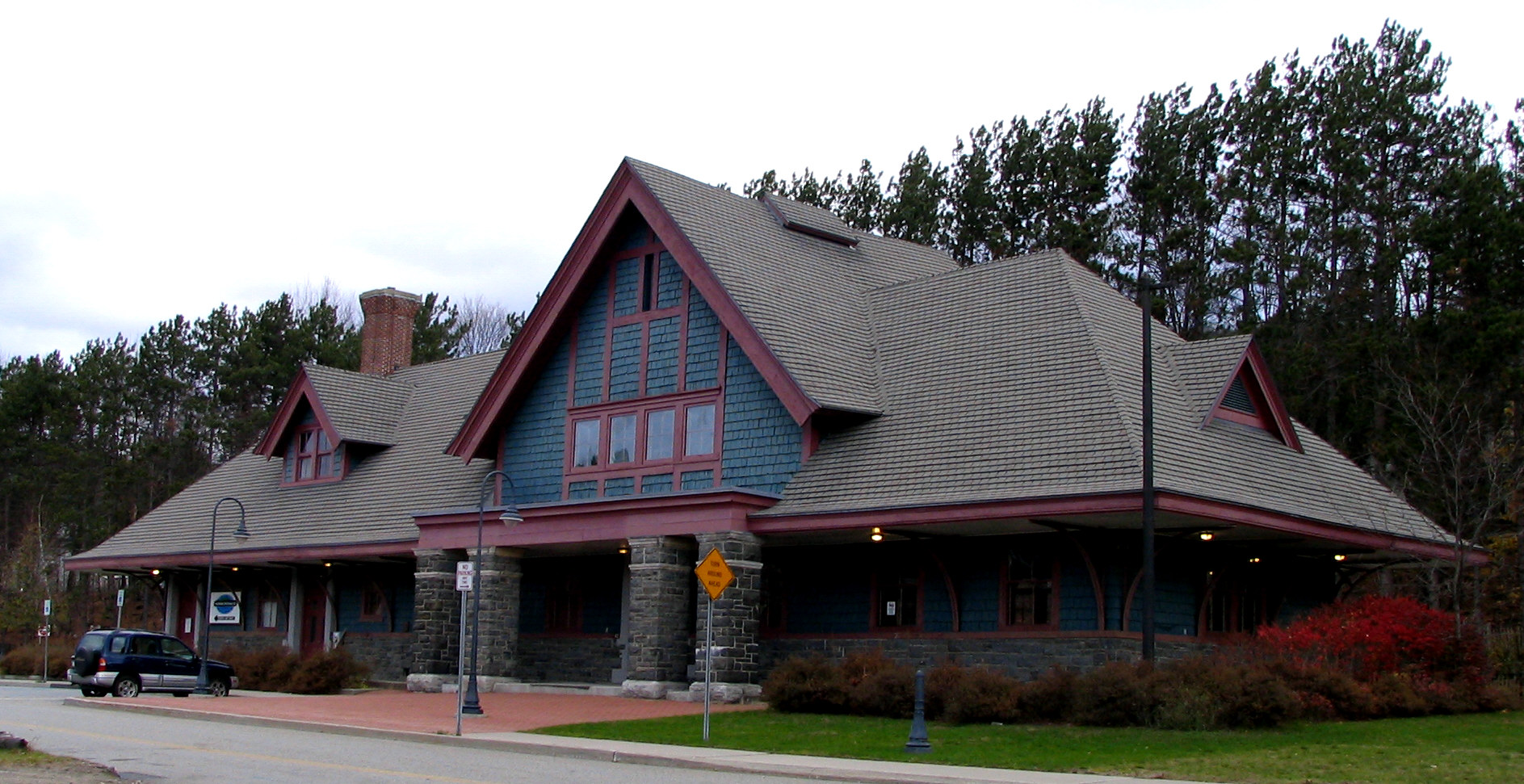
Union Depot, Saranac Lake

Historic Saranac Lake is a non-profit, membership organization dedicated to the preservation of the history and architectural heritage of the Saranac Lake area of New York State in the Adirondacks.

== History ==
Founded on 15 January 1980, the organization has successfully nominated over 170 properties for listing on the National Register of Historic Places. Since 1987, Historic Saranac Lake has also hosted lectures on local history and concerts of traditional Adirondack music. They have joined with other organizations in preserving the 1894 laboratory of Edward Livingston Trudeau, the 1904 Union Depot of the Delaware and Hudson Railroad/New York Central Railroad and the cottage where, in 1945, Béla Bartók spent his last summer writing his Third Piano Concerto and Viola Concerto. They have also restored several historic houses that were in danger of being torn down.

== About ==
Historic Saranac Lake is led by Amy B. Catania, executive director, along with Museum Administrator Chessie Monks-Kelly and Museum Specialist Emily Banach.

== Programs ==
The organization offers walking tours of the village, and produces educational events that feature historic sites and lectures on the unique history of the region, from its popularity among sportsmen and nature lovers starting in the mid-18th century to its pre-eminence in the treatment of tuberculosis from 1890 to 1950. They have published a number of articles and books focused on the lives and architecture of the region, including Cure Cottages of Saranac Lake by Philip L. Gallos.

Since 2008, Historic Saranac Lake has operated a wiki that has grown to more than eight thousand pages with more than thirteen thousand photographs. It covers Saranac Lake's geographically large school district (more than 600 square miles) which includes areas such as Coreys, Loon Lake, Paul Smiths and Gabriels. The wiki was mentioned in a 2010 article on "Crowdsourcing" written by Tim Grove of the Smithsonian Institution on the American Association of State and Local History website.

== See also ==
- Adirondack Scenic Railroad
- Adirondack Cottage Sanitarium
- Church Street Historic District
- Cure Cottages of Saranac Lake
- National Register of Historic Places listings in Essex County
- National Register of Historic Places listings in Franklin County
- Saranac Lake Union Depot
