= Trevor-Roper =

Trevor-Roper is a surname of British origin. The component Trevor either derives from the personal name Trevor or is a Welsh locational surname, named after places in Wales called tref, meaning "homestead" or "settlement". Roper is an occupational surname for a maker or seller of rope. The name may refer to:

- Hugh Trevor-Roper (1914–2003), British historian
- Patrick Trevor-Roper (1916–2004), British surgeon and gay rights activist

== See also ==
- Roper (surname)
- Trevor
