= Trevorrow =

Trevorrow is a Cornish surname originating in the Cornish language.

Notable people with the surname include:

- Colin Trevorrow (born 1976), American director and screenwriter
- Ellen Trevorrow (born 1955), Ngarrindjeri weaver and cultural educator at Camp Coorong, South Australia
- Georgina Trevorrow, Australian musician
- John Trevorrow (born 1949), Australian cyclist
- Josephine Ruby Trevorrow (1935–2018), consort of the Crown Prince of Johor, Malaysia
- Mark Trevorrow (born 1959), Australian comedian and television host
- Tom Trevorrow (died 2013), husband of Ellen, who ran Camp Coorong with her

== See also ==
- Eric Treverrow (1926–2015), Scottish footballer
- Trevorrow, a place in the parish of Ludgvan in Cornwall
- Trevor (disambiguation)
- Trefor (disambiguation)
- Trev
