= Allan Seager =

American novelist

Allan Seager (February 5, 1906 – May 10, 1968) was an American novelist and short story writer based in Michigan. His stories were published in such leading magazines as The New Yorker and Esquire. He also taught creative writing to generations of students at the University of Michigan from 1935 to 1968.

Seager won a Rhodes Scholarship to Oxford University. After returning to the United States, he worked for a time as an assistant editor at Vanity Fair magazine in New York City. He returned to the university at Ann Arbor to teach creative writing and write his own works. He published five novels, more than 80 short stories, some of which are collected in two books; and a biography of poet Theodore Roethke.

== Early life and education ==
Born and raised in Adrian, Michigan, Seager attended the University of Michigan as an undergraduate. There he was a member of two national championship swimming teams. Among his classmates and lifelong friends was Theodore Roethke, who later became a renowned poet.

Seager earned a Rhodes Scholarship to Oxford University. When his studies were interrupted by a bout of tuberculosis, Seager returned to the US to spend a year "curing" at the Adirondack Cottage Sanitarium in Saranac Lake, New York. At the time, there were no antibiotics to treat the disease. He returned to Oxford and completed his degree.

== Writing career ==
After his return to the United States from England, Seager worked for Vanity Fair magazine in New York City for a time as an assistant editor.

He returned to Ann Arbor in 1935. There he taught creative writing at the University of Michigan until 1968.

Seager published more than 80 short stories in such leading magazines as The New Yorker, Esquire, The Atlantic, and Sports Illustrated. E.J. O'Brien, editor of the yearly Best American Short Stories series, once stated that the "apostolic succession of the American short story" ran from Sherwood Anderson to Ernest Hemingway to Seager. numerous works of his own, with collected short stories published in books in 1950 and 1964.

Seager drew from his time at the Saranac Lake sanitarium, undergraduate years in Ann Arbor and at Oxford for the semi-autobiographical short stories he published that were collected in A Frieze of Girls (1964).

His last book was a biography of poet Theodore Roethke, which he struggled to finish while ill. It was published in 1968. Seager identified strongly with the poet, as they had come from similar backgrounds and had created themselves as writers.

While living in Seattle and teaching at the University of Washington, in the spring of 1963 Theodore Roethke introduced his friend Seager by telephone to poet and novelist James Dickey, who was in the city for a reading. Dickey told Seager that his novel Amos Berry was a principal reason why Dickey had pursued poetry. Writing was not part of his background, but he had been inspired by Charles Berry, the son in the novel, who persisted at working at poetry. Dickey felt that Seager's talent had not been sufficiently recognized by the public or critics.

== Personal life ==
Seager married and had two daughters. He won a Fulbright Fellowship that him to take his family to travel to France for his research.

He and his family lived in Tecumseh, Michigan. He died there of lung cancer in 1968.

== Bibliography ==
=== Novels ===
- Equinox. New York: Simon and Schuster, 1943.
- The Inheritance. New York: Simon and Schuster, 1948
- Amos Berry. New York: Simon and Schuster, 1953.
- Hilda Manning. New York: Simon and Schuster, 1956
- Death of Anger. New York: McDowell, Obolensky, 1960.

=== Short stories ===
- A Frieze of Girls: Memoirs as Fiction. New York: McGraw-Hill, 1964
- The Old Man of the Mountain. New York: Simon and Schuster, 1950

=== Nonfiction ===
- The Glass House: The Life of Theodore Roethke. New York: McGraw-Hill, 1968 (First Edition)
- The Glass House: The Life of Theodore Roethke. Ann Arbor: University of Michigan Press, 1991 (Reprint Edition including introduction by poetDonald Hall)
- They Worked for a Better World. New York: Macmillan, 1939.

=== Translation ===
- Stendhal. Memoirs of a Tourist. Evanston: Northwestern University Press, 1962.
