= Hermann Brehmer =

German physician

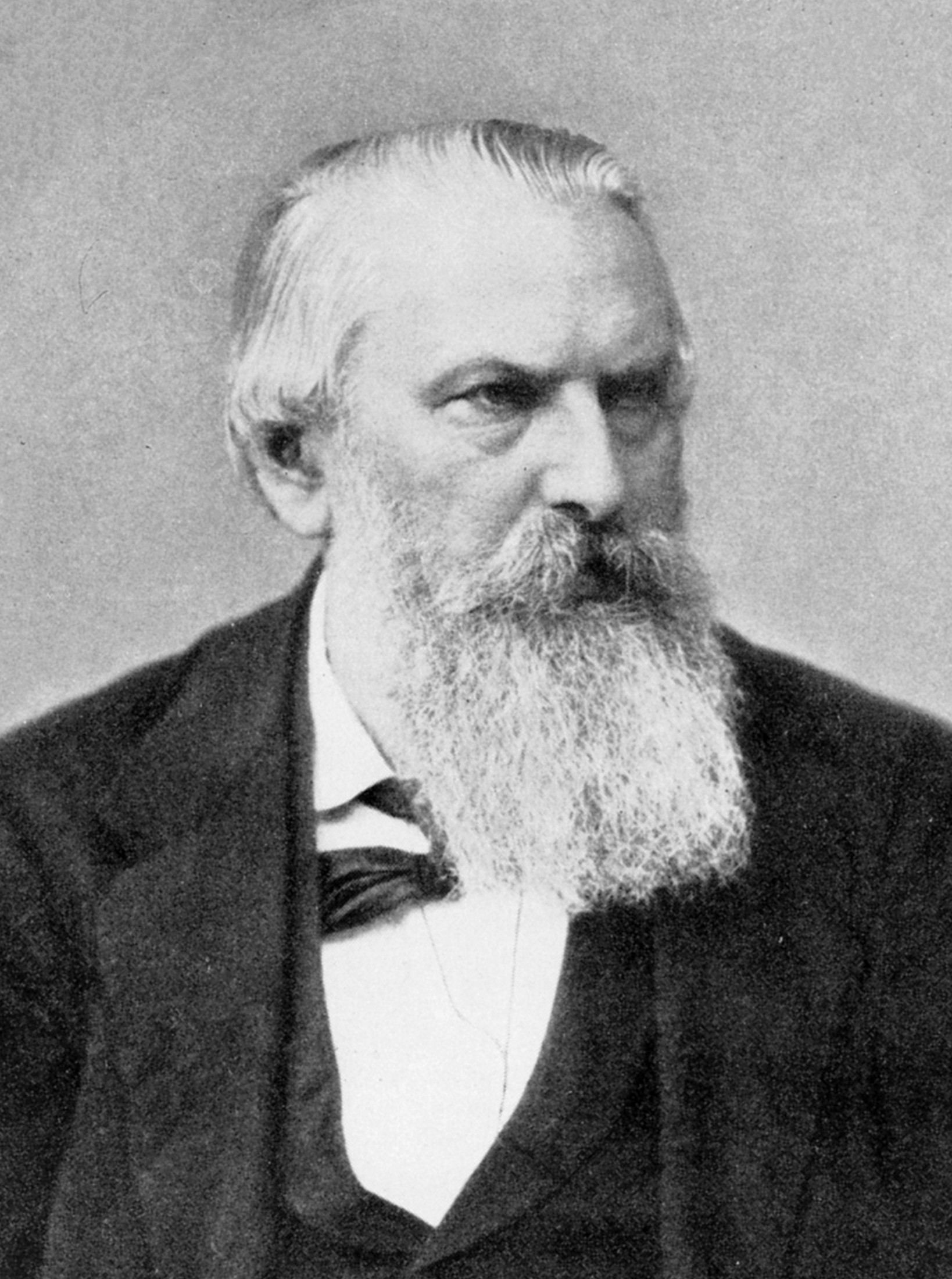
Hermann Brehmer

Hermann Brehmer (14 August 1826 – 28 December 1889) was a German medical doctor who established the first German sanatorium for the systematic open-air treatment of tuberculosis.

== Biography ==
Brehmer was born in Kurtsch (Kurczów) near Strehlen (Strzelin), Prussian Silesia. He studied mathematics, astronomy, and natural science at the University of Breslau (Wrocław) from 1847 to 1850. Having gone to Berlin to work at an herbarium in 1850, he abandoned natural science and dedicated himself to medicine at the University of Berlin, receiving his doctorate in 1853.

Alternately, as a botany student in Silesia, Brehmer was diagnosed with tuberculosis and told to find a healthier climate. He went to the Himalayas, continued his studies, and found himself cured. In 1854 he returned to Germany to study medicine, ultimately writing a dissertation titled "Tuberculosis is a Curable Disease".

By 1854 Brehmer had settled in Görbersdorf (Sokołowsko), Silesia and opened the Brehmersche Heilanstalt für Lungenkranke, a hospital in Görbersdorf where patients were exposed to plentiful amounts of high altitude fresh air, and good nutrition. Initially, his sanatorium was based in a small group of cottages, though it would grow to have 300 beds. The results surpassed all previous treatments.

Brehmer died in Görbersdorf. His work was continued by one of his patients, Peter Dettweiler (1837–1904), who opened his own sanatorium (Heilanstalt Falkenberg in Hesse) in 1876; however, Dettweiler emphasized rest rather than exercise. Brehmer and Dettweiler's work was the primary influence on Dr. Edward Trudeau in establishing the successful Adirondack Cottage Sanitarium at Saranac Lake, New York, in the 1880s.
