= John B. Trevor Jr. =

American activist (1909–2006)

- Born: July 4, 1909
- Died: August 27, 2006 (aged 97)
- Education: Columbia College; Columbia School of Mines, Engineering and Chemistry
- Parent(s): John B. Trevor, Sr. Caroline Murray Wilmerding

John Bond Trevor, Jr. (4 July 1909 – 27 August 2006) was an electrical engineer, author, trustee of the Trudeau Institute, and a director of the Pioneer Fund.

== Biography ==
Trevor was born in 1909. His father, John B. Trevor, Sr., was an influential immigration restrictionist. Trevor graduated Columbia College and Columbia School of Mines, Engineering and Chemistry.

During World War II, he was Project Engineer in charge of developing and evaluating Shipborne Anti-Aircraft Control Systems at the Naval Research Laboratory; author of several classified books and manuals for the armed forces; decorated with the Meritorious Civilian Service Award by the United States Navy.

Trevor spent decades in the Pioneer Fund, the funder of scientific racism, as a director and treasurer. Testifying against more liberal immigration laws in 1965, Trevor warned against "a conglomeration of racial and ethnic elements" that he said led to "a serious culture decline." He was a founder of the American Coalition of Patriotic Societies, which promoted "undivided allegiance to the United States" as well as immigration restrictions.

Trevor was a trustee of the Trudeau Institute for twenty-two years.

An accomplished sailor, he was Commodore of the St. Regis Yacht Club (1938–1939, 1962–1964, 1979–1980), and he co-authored Wind and Tide in Yacht Racing.

He was a past president of the New York Genealogical and Biographical Society, as well as a past trustee of the Cooper Hewitt, Smithsonian Design Museum. He was the oldest member of the Union Club of New York City at the time of his death on August 27, 2006. His papers are stored at the University of Michigan.
