= Bodffordd =

Place in Anglesey, Wales

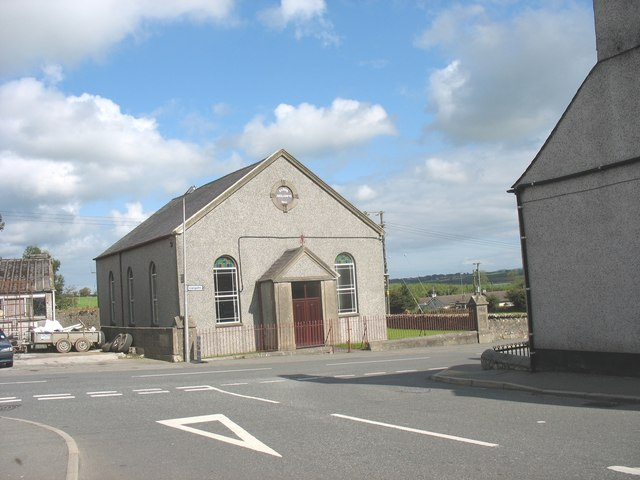
- Capel Sardis Chapel, Bodffordd

- Location within Anglesey
- Population: 960 (2011)
- OS grid reference: SH4276
- Community: Bodffordd
- Principal area: Anglesey
- Preserved county: Gwynedd
- Country: Wales
- Sovereign state: United Kingdom
- Post town: LLANGEFNI
- Postcode district: LL77
- Dialling code: 01248
- Police: North Wales
- Fire: North Wales
- Ambulance: Welsh
- UK Parliament: Ynys Môn
- Senedd Cymru – Welsh Parliament: Bangor Conwy Môn
- List of places UK Wales Anglesey 53.262°N 4.363°W Map of the community

Bodffordd (Welsh pronunciation) is a village and community in central Anglesey, Wales. As of the 2011 census, the community's population was 960. The community includes the hamlets of Trefor, Heneglwys and Bodwrog.

== Description and history ==
Bodffordd is located just under 2 miles (3.2 km) from the county town of Llangefni, on the south western edge of the reservoir, Llyn Cefni. It is the nearest settlement to RAF Mona and as a community council, it includes the village of Trefor. According to the United Kingdom Census 2001, 77.9% of the population in the electoral division can speak the Welsh language; the 15-year-old age group has the highest number of speakers, in which 100% of the group can speak the Welsh language.

The village was originally called Bodffordd Esgob, the Esgob indicating that it belonged to a bishop, the Bishop of Bangor in this case. Village life once revolved around the windmill just north of the village and its related trades. This has now been converted into a private residence. Many of these older dwellings have fallen into disrepair but the village church, dedicated to St. Llwydian, is still in good condition.

It was chosen to host the 2007 Anglesey Eisteddfod.

The village is the site of the Mona Industrial Estate, which in 2009 was given planning permission to build a 25,000-tonne animal waste anaerobic digestion plant. Developer Ecoparc Môn, part of Anglesey-based Gray's Waste Management Systems, has been promised £1.1m in grants from the Welsh Assembly Government through the Waste & Resources Action Programme, towards the developments £3.5m projected cost.

One of the most well-known people born in the village is Osian Roberts, who played association football for Bangor City before moving into management. Currently assistant manager of the national team, Roberts had previously managed several national youth teams as well as the senior club, Porthmadog.

== Lakes ==
The Village of Bodffordd has two lakes, ‘Llyn Frogwy’ and Llyn Cefni. The latter is now used as a public footpath, which people use in order to travel to the town of Llangefni. Llyn Frogwy is located behind Bodffordd's mill, ‘Melin Frogwy’, which is now privately owned.

== Governance ==
Until 2012 an electoral ward with the same name existed, sending a county councillor to the Isle of Anglesey County Council. It included part of Llangristiolus with a total population of 1,534. Following the Isle of Anglesey electoral boundary changes Bodffordd became part of a larger Canolbarth Môn ward, which includes three neighbouring communities and part of Llanddyfnan. The new ward elects three county councillors.
