= John B. Trevor Sr. =

American lawyer and immigration restrictionist (1878–1956)

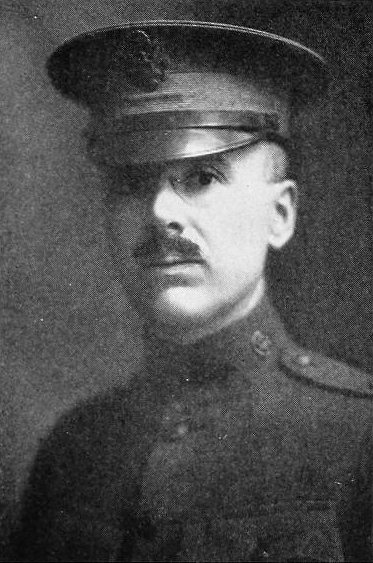
- John B. Trevor during World War I
- Born: November 19, 1878; Yonkers, New York
- Died: February 12, 1956 (aged 77); New York, New York
- Occupations: Lawyer; Lobbyist
- Spouse: Caroline Murray Wilmerding
- Children: 2 sons

John Bond Trevor Sr. (November 19, 1878 – February 12, 1956) was an American lawyer and influential lobbyist for immigration restrictions. A wealthy nativist, he was an architect of the Immigration Act of 1924, which banned Asian immigration and established quotas that stood for forty years until 1964.

== Biography ==
=== Early life and education ===
Trevor was born in Yonkers, New York, on November 19, 1878. His father, John Bond Trevor, was an early Wall Street stockbroker. His ancestors included a New York City mayor and William Floyd, a signer of the Declaration of Independence.

He attended Columbia Law School and received his law degree from Harvard in 1902.

=== Activism, military, and Lusk Committee ===
Trevor was wealthy and became a prominent New York socialite. He was involved in the eugenics movement, in the circle of Madison Grant, whose office was next door to his in New York City's Financial District. Trevor was a member of the Eugenics Research Association, the American Eugenics Society, the Immigration Restriction League, and the American Defense Society. He was also in the Society of Colonial Wars and was a trustee of the American Museum of Natural History.

Trevor served in the U.S. Army in World War I and was decorated as chevalier in the French Légion d’Honneur. After the 1918 armistice, he was put in charge of the Army's Military Intelligence Division branch in New York as a captain. In the Red Scare he directed spying operations on the city's immigrants, especially Jews. He was discharged in 1919 and was named a deputy attorney general of the State of New York. In 1920, he was associate counsel for the U.S. Senate Foreign Relations Sub-Committee, and counsel of the New York State Legislative Committee Investigating Subversive Activities (the Lusk Committee). The latter, whose work Trevor helped orchestrate, launched raids against suspected radicals, arresting 500 and deporting 246. He was also a lobbyist for patriotic societies.

=== Immigration restrictions ===
Trevor is described as having been "one of the most influential unelected officials affiliated with the U.S. Congress" and "the most influential lobbyist for restriction" of immigration. Trevor's influential "national origins" proposal for the Immigration Act of 1924 assigned restrictive quotas similar to what Trevor deemed as the previous composition of the American population. The act, which was signed by President Calvin Coolidge and took full effect in 1929, banned Asian immigration and sharply cut levels of immigration previously allowed from Southern Europe and Eastern Europe. After the law passed, Trevor worked to defend the quota system. The quotas stood until 1964.

In 1927 Trevor founded a group that became the American Coalition of Patriotic, Civic and Fraternal Societies, with a slogan of "Keep America American". It was an umbrella group of more than 100 civic groups, including the Sons of the American Revolution and the Daughters of the American Revolution. Trevor and his coalition campaigned against admitting Jewish refugees fleeing Nazi Germany in the 1930s into the United States. Immigration advocate Louis Adamic described Trevor as the top American promoter of fascism and "America's alien-bater No. 1", and wrote caustically of Trevor in 1936 that "if a man's love for his country is measurable by his detestation of all who had the bad taste to be born elsewhere, there probably is no greater patriot in America to-day." Trevor unsuccessfully opposed a 1943 law to welcome some Chinese (who were World War II allies) into the United States. He was the coalition's president until 1950.

=== Other causes ===
Trevor was an advisor to the Christian Crusade of Billy James Hargis. A committee associated with Trevor called Ten Million Americans Mobilizing for Justice defended Senator Joseph McCarthy against censure by the Senate.

Trevor was a member of the Sons of the American Revolution, which awarded him a gold medal for Americanism in 1951.

Trevor was a founding trustee of Paul Smith's College of Arts and Sciences and was a vice president there. He was also at various times a trustee of the American Museum of Natural History, a trustee of New York University, and Commodore of the St. Regis Yacht Club (1938-1939).

== Personal life ==
He married Caroline Murray Wilmerding (one of the oldest friends of Eleanor Roosevelt) on June 25, 1908. They had two sons. His son John B. Trevor Jr. also was involved with the American Coalition of Patriotic Societies, was on the board of the Pioneer Fund, and was a trustee of the Trudeau Institute.
