= Trevor Segstro =

Canadian ice hockey player

- Born: September 11, 1978 (age 47) Calgary, Alberta, Canada
- Height: 6 ft 1 in (185 cm)
- Weight: 210 lb (95 kg; 15 st 0 lb)
- Position: Right wing
- Shot: Right
- Played for: AHL; Portland Pirates; UHL; Elmira Jackals; Adirondack IceHawks; Adirondack Frostbite
- NHL draft: Undrafted
- Playing career: 2003–2005

Trevor Segstro (born September 11, 1978) is a Canadian former professional ice hockey player.

Segstro attended the University of Calgary where he played five seasons (1998 – 2003) of CIS hockey with the Calgary Dinos men's ice hockey team. He went on to play professionally in the United Hockey League (UHL), scoring 29 goals and 36 assists for 65 points, while earning 44 penalty minutes in 108 UHL games played.
