= Trevor James =

Trevor James may refer to:

- Trevor James (sprinter) (born 1949), Trinidad and Tobago sprinter
- Trevor James (YouTuber) (born 1988), Canadian food and travel vlogger
- Trevor James (football manager), English football manager
- Trevor James (priest), New Zealand Anglican priest

== See also ==
- Trevor Jamieson (born 1975), Australian actor
