= St. Regis Lakes =

St. Regis Lake is the name of two lakes on the St. Regis River in the Adirondack Mountains:

- Upper St. Regis Lake
- Lower St. Regis Lake

== See also ==
- Saint Regis Pond
