= Trev =

Trev is a masculine given name, sometimes a short form (hypocorism) of Trevor or other names.

It may refer to:

== People ==
- Trev Alberts (born 1970), American college sports administrator and the director of athletics and former National Football League player
- Treve Trev Broudy (born 1968), American actor and former model, victim of a violent attack possibly due to his being gay
- Lawrence "Trev" Cole, a member of the indie pop band D.I.D. (formerly Dog Is Dead)
- Trevor Cooper (born 1953), English actor
- Treverance Trev Faulk (born 1981), American former National Football League player
- Trevor McGrat, a contestant on the TV show Hell's Kitchen (U.S. season 8)
- Trevor Neal, half of the British comedy duo Trevor and Simon in the 1980s and '90s
- Trev Thoms (died 2010), British guitarist

== Fictional characters ==
- Trev, in the 2006 animated film Happy Feet, voiced by Steve Irwin
- Trev, a recurring character on the animated TV series Bob's Burgers
- Professor Trevor Anderson, in the 2008 movie Journey to the Center of the Earth, played by Brendan Fraser
- Trevor Brown, in the Archie Comics universe
- Trev Johnson, in the Jacqueline Woodson short story "Trev"
- Trevor LeBlanc, on the TV show Army Wives
- Trevor Philips, One of the 3 GTA V protagonist voiced by Steven Ogg

== See also ==
- Trevelyan College, Durham, known colloquially as Trevs
