= Trefor, Anglesey =

Coordinates: 53.292184°N 4.440426°W

Trefor
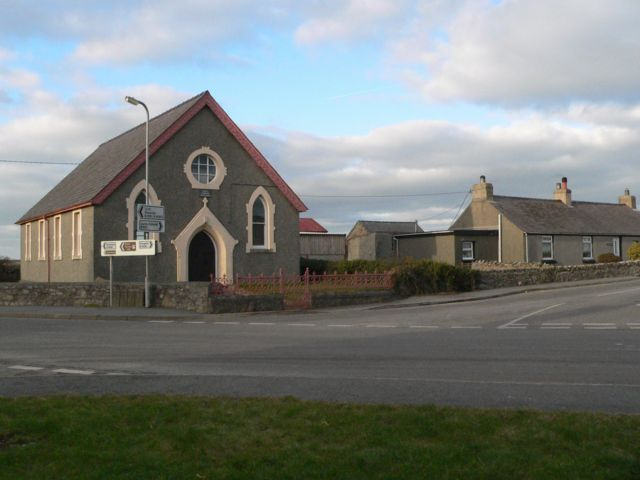
- Buildings in Trefor

- Location within Anglesey
- OS grid reference: SH 3744 8002
  - Cardiff: 136 mi (219 km)
  - London: 219.6 mi (353.4 km)
- Community: Bodffordd
- Principal area: Anglesey
- Country: Wales
- Sovereign state: United Kingdom
- Post town: Holyhead
- Police: North Wales
- Fire: North Wales
- Ambulance: Welsh
- UK Parliament: Ynys Môn
- Senedd Cymru – Welsh Parliament: Ynys Môn

Trefor is a hamlet in the community of Bodffordd, Anglesey, Wales, which is 136 miles (218.9 km) from Cardiff and 219.6 miles (353.4 km) from London.

== See also ==
- List of localities in Wales by population
