= Trudeau Institute =

Research center in Saranac Lake, New York

Coordinates: 44°19′4.83″N 74°9′33.9″W

- Founder: Edward Livingston Trudeau
- Established: 1884
- Focus: tuberculosis treatment
- Location: Saranac Lake, New York
- Website: trudeauinstitute.org

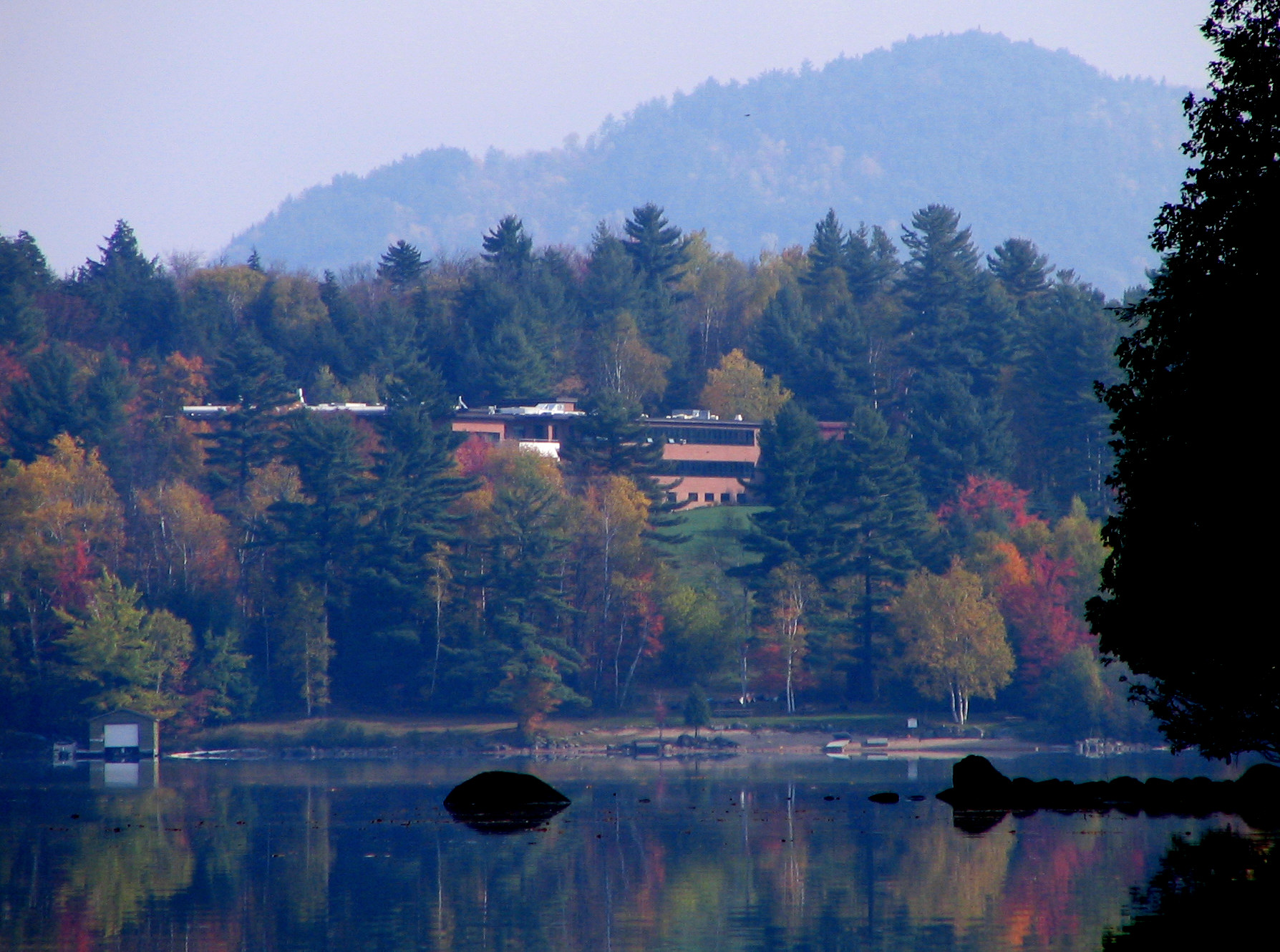
Campus of the Trudeau Institute from Lower Saranac Lake.

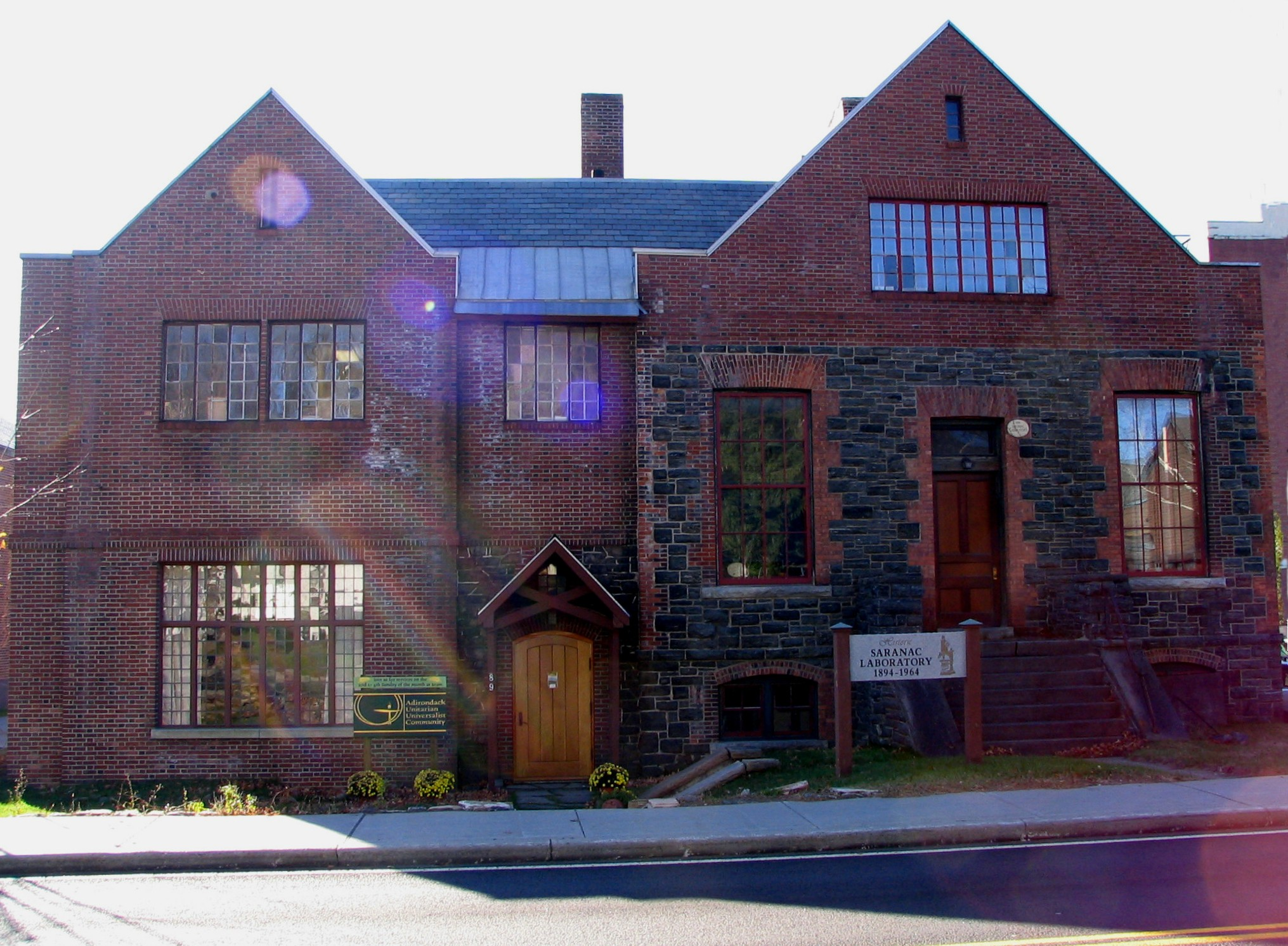
Saranac Laboratory, precursor to the Trudeau Institute. Presently the home of Historic Saranac Lake, a local nonprofit, historic preservation organization

The Trudeau Institute is an independent, not-for-profit, biomedical research center located on a 42 acres (170,000 m^{2}) campus in Saranac Lake, New York. Its scientific mission is to make breakthrough discoveries that lead to improved human health. Its current president is Bill Reiley. As of 2024, the institute employed 64 staff.

== History ==
Trudeau Institute is named for tuberculosis researcher Edward Livingston Trudeau, who founded the Adirondack Cottage Sanitarium in 1884 in Saranac Lake, New York, to serve as a tuberculosis treatment and research facility. Trudeau, who had himself survived a tuberculosis infection during a stay at Paul Smith's Hotel in the Adirondacks, believed that the clean air in the region would improve health outcomes. Several other cure cottages opened in the town after the sanitarium. In 1894, after a fire destroyed his small laboratory, Trudeau built the Saranac Laboratory for the Study of Tuberculosis, the first laboratory in the United States dedicated to the study of tuberculosis. He was later elected the first president of the National Association for the Study and Prevention of Tuberculosis, the predecessor of the American Lung Association. He died in 1915 at age 67.

Following Trudeau's death, the sanitarium's name was changed to the Trudeau Sanatorium, and a foundation and school were established to train physicians and healthcare professionals in the latest tuberculosis treatment methods. By 1947, more than 15,000 patients had received treatment there. The sanatorium closed in 1954, after the discovery of effective antibiotic treatments for tuberculosis. In 1957 Trudeau's grandson, Francis B. Trudeau Jr., sold the property to the American Management Association. The proceeds were invested in a new medical research facility built on Lower Saranac Lake, which became the Trudeau Institute and opened in 1964. Trudeau's Saranac Laboratory has been restored by Historic Saranac Lake and now serves as its headquarters and a museum.

Trudeau Institute was traditionally reliant on research grants from the National Institutes of Health to fund research, but following declines in grants, the institution lost staff and received offers to relocate out of New York. Beginning in 2016, the institute was revitalized under the leadership of Atsuo Kuki, who reoriented projects from pure research to applied science, a strategy he labeled "Trudeau 3.0". The institute hosted a summit on infectious disease in 2018. During the COVID-19 pandemic, the institute collaborated with several academic institutions and bio-pharma companies on research projects related to the disease, including vaccine development as part of Operation Warp Speed. In July 2020, due to their role in assisting the regional community during the COVID-19 pandemic, the Saranac Lake Chamber of Commerce honored Adirondack Health and the Trudeau Institute as joint partners of the year. The institute also partnered with the Walter Reed Army Institute of Research to develop a vaccine for the Zika virus.
