= Brighton, Franklin County, New York =

Brighton, New York
- Town
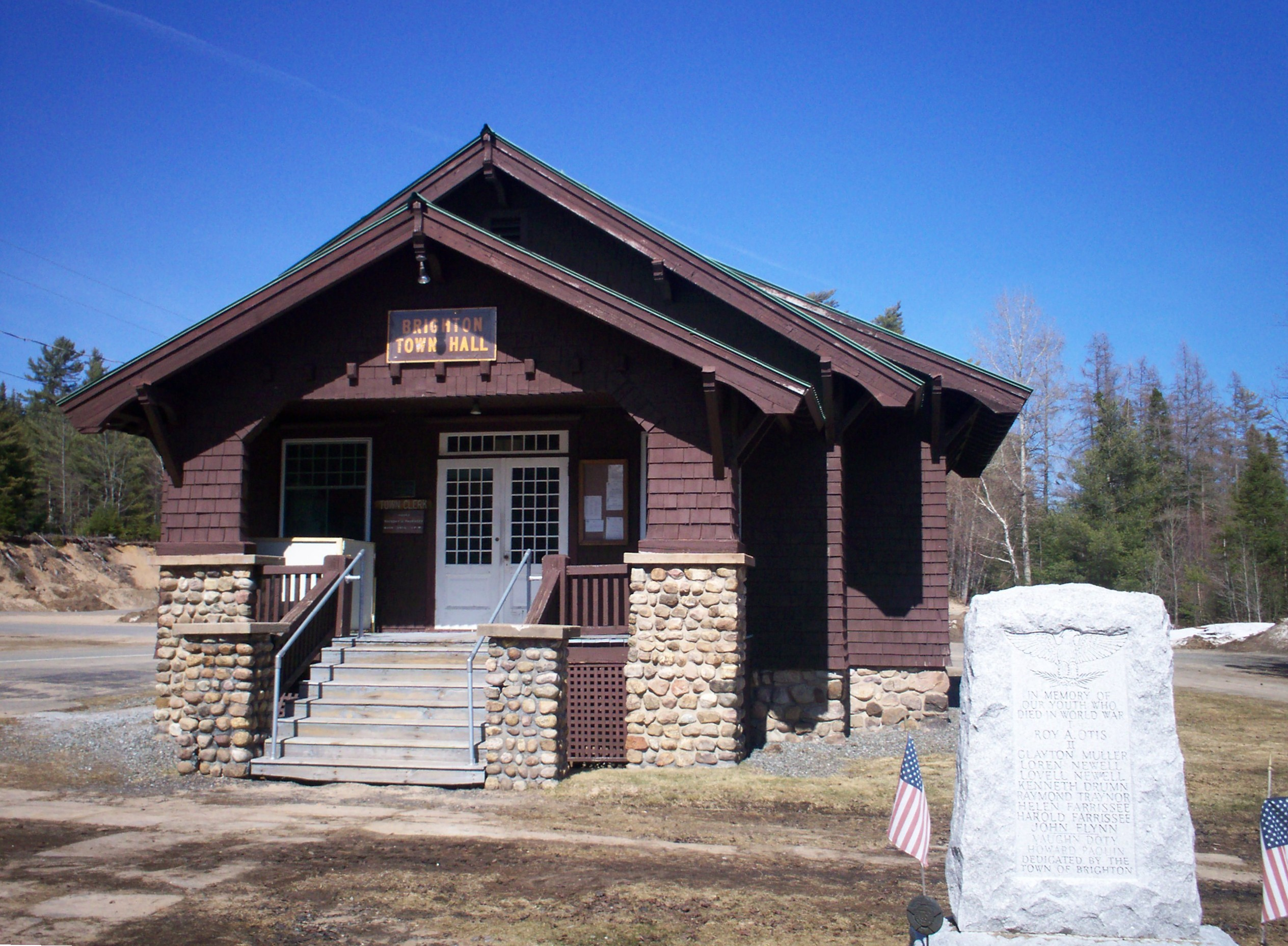
- Brighton Town Hall, Benjamin A. Muncil, 1914

- Location within the state of New York Brighton (the United States)
- Coordinates: 44°26′27″N 74°13′56″W
- Country: United States
- State: New York
- County: Franklin
- Named after: Brighton, England

Government
  - Type: Town Council
  - Town Supervisor: Peter Shrope (D)
  - Town Council: Members' List: • Steven A. Tucker (D); • Jeffrey Leavitt (R); • Lydia A. Wright (D); • Peter E. Shrope, Jr. (D)

Area
  - Total: 83.00 sq mi (214.96 km^{2})
  - Land: 77.90 sq mi (201.75 km^{2})
  - Water: 5.10 sq mi (13.21 km^{2})
- Elevation: 1,880 ft (573 m)

Population (2010)
  - Total: 1,435
  - Estimate (2016): 1,426
  - Density: 18.3/sq mi (7.07/km^{2})
- Time zone: UTC-5 (Eastern (EST))
  - Summer (DST): UTC-4 (EDT)
- ZIP Codes: 12970 (Paul Smiths); 12976 (Rainbow Lake); 12939 (Gabriels); 12945 (Lake Clear)
- FIPS code: 36-08213
- GNIS feature ID: 0978752
- Website: townofbrighton.net

Brighton is a town in Franklin County, New York, United States. The population was 1,435 at the 2010 census. It was named after Brighton, England, by early surveyors in the region.

The town is in the southern part of the county and is inside the Adirondack Park. Paul Smith's College is in the community of Paul Smiths, a hamlet of Brighton.

== History ==
The Town of Brighton was set aside from the town of Duane in 1858 when settlers living in southern Duane complained loudly enough about being left out of town business discussions due to the long distance and time involved. James M. Wardner was elected its first supervisor. Apollos "Paul" Smith arrived in 1859 and gradually built up a hotel in the community that bears his name. Paul Smith's Hotel grew into one of the largest and most well-known, attracting U.S. presidents, governors and other prominent guests.

After Paul Smith's death in 1912, it was run by his son, Phelps Smith, until it burned down in 1930. Paul Smith's College was established in 1937 after the death of Phelps Smith; it matriculated its first class in 1946. The college now uses the land where the hotel once stood along Lower St. Regis Lake. Also around that time James Wardner had a small hotel on Rainbow Lake.

The hamlet now called Gabriels originated when Alfonzo Rand, William Ricketson, the Dustins, and the Otises cleared virgin forest land and began farming the sandy loam soils in the southern part of the town along the boundary with the Town of Harrietstown near Ricketson Brook and today's Split Rock Road. It wasn't until the Adirondack and St. Lawrence Railroad came in 1892 that Gabriels expanded northward with many settling near the railroad station. Following the arrival of the railroad, the Sisters of Mercy established a tuberculosis sanitorium on the small hill near the rail station in 1897. Around the same time, Muncil's sawmill was established on a siding north of the station. Paul Smith's Hotel immediately started a stage line to the railroad station. When the Sisters of Mercy closed The Gabriels Sanatorium and moved to Lake Placid, the San was sold to Paul Smith's College. Still later, it was sold to New York State which converted it into Camp Gabriels, a minimum-security state prison, which closed in 2009.

The Brighton Town Hall was designed and built by Benjamin A. Muncil in 1914. Muncil was a talented local builder who also designed and built Marjorie Merriweather Post's Camp Topridge, and White Pine Camp, which was used as a summer White House of US President Calvin Coolidge. It was listed on the National Register of Historic Places in 2003.

== Geography ==
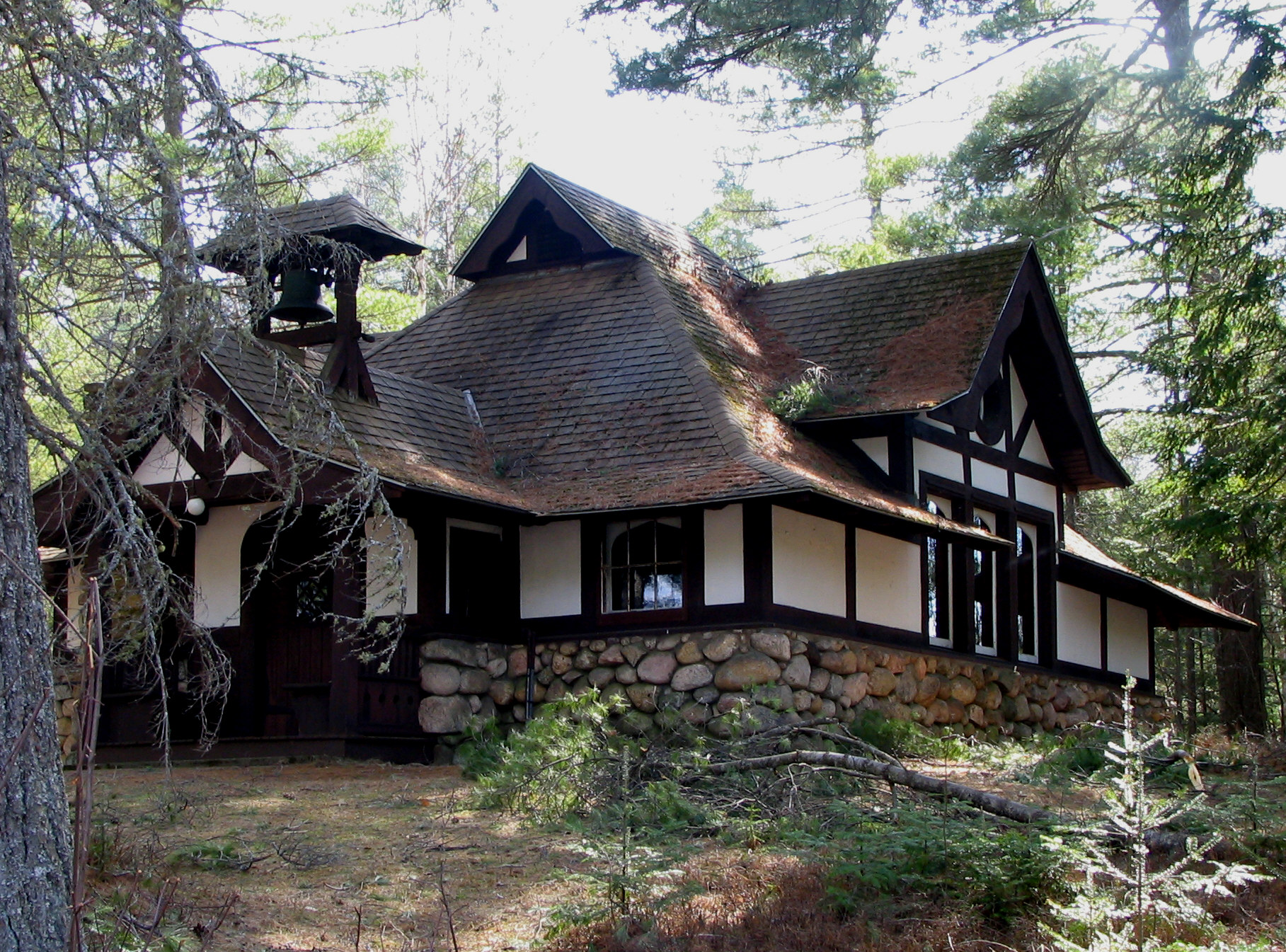
Saint Regis Presbyterian Church, Keese Mill

Brighton is located south of the center of Franklin County within the limits of the Adirondack Forest Preserve. According to the United States Census Bureau, the town has a total area of 83.0 square miles (215.0 km^{2}), of which 77.9 square miles (201.7 km^{2}) is land and 5.1 square miles (13.2 km^{2}), or 6.15%, is water. The majority of the town consists of woodlands, lakes, streams and ponds (both publicly and privately owned), with a few areas of developed hamlets and farmland (privately owned). Major water bodies include Upper and Lower St. Regis Lake in the southwest corner of town.

New York State Route 30 is a north–south highway in the town and intersects New York State Route 86 at Paul Smiths. NY 30 leads north 32 miles (51 km) to Malone, the Franklin County seat, and southwest 26 miles (42 km) to Tupper Lake. NY 86 leads southeast 12 miles (19 km) to Saranac Lake.

== Demographics ==
Historical population
Census	Pop.	Note	%±
1860	208		—
1870	204		−1.9%
1880	267		30.9%
1890	480		79.8%
1900	706		47.1%
1910	741		5.0%
1920	684		−7.7%
1930	993		45.2%
1940	804		−19.0%
1950	962		19.7%
1960	1,092		13.5%
1970	1,473		34.9%
1980	1,625		10.3%
1990	1,511		−7.0%
2000	1,682		11.3%
2010	1,435		−14.7%
2016 (est.)	1,426		−0.6%
U.S. Decennial Census

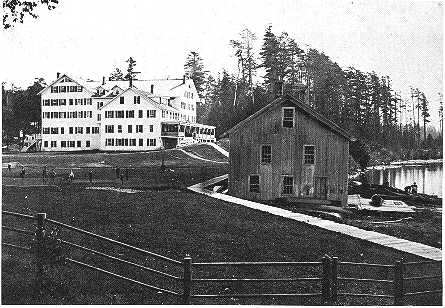
Paul Smith's Hotel, circa 1892

As of the census of 2000, there were 1,682 people, 319 households, and 203 families residing in the town. The population density was 21.6 inhabitants per square mile (8.3/km^{2}). There were 591 housing units at an average density of 7.6 per square mile (2.9/km^{2}). The racial makeup of the town was 79.37% White, 18.55% African American, 0.65% Native American, 1.19% Asian, and 0.24% from two or more races. Hispanic or Latino of any race were 0.48% of the population.

There were 319 households, out of which 34.5% had children under the age of 18 living with them, 53.9% were married couples living together, 5.0% had a female householder with no husband present, and 36.1% were non-families. 29.2% of all households were made up of individuals, and 9.1% had someone living alone who was 65 years of age or older. The average household size was 2.46 and the average family size was 3.04.

In the town, the population was spread out, with 11.7% under the age of 18, 37.5% from 18 to 24, 29.8% from 25 to 44, 15.5% from 45 to 64, and 5.4% who were 65 years of age or older. The median age was 26 years. For every 100 females, there were 215.0 males. For every 100 females age 18 and over, there were 246.2 males.

The median income for a household in the town was $42,679, and the median income for a family was $48,250. Males had a median income of $35,952 versus $26,250 for females. The per capita income for the town was $11,995. About 3.0% of families and 6.2% of the population were below the poverty line, including 5.3% of those under age 18 and 8.7% of those age 65 or over.

== Communities and locations in Brighton ==
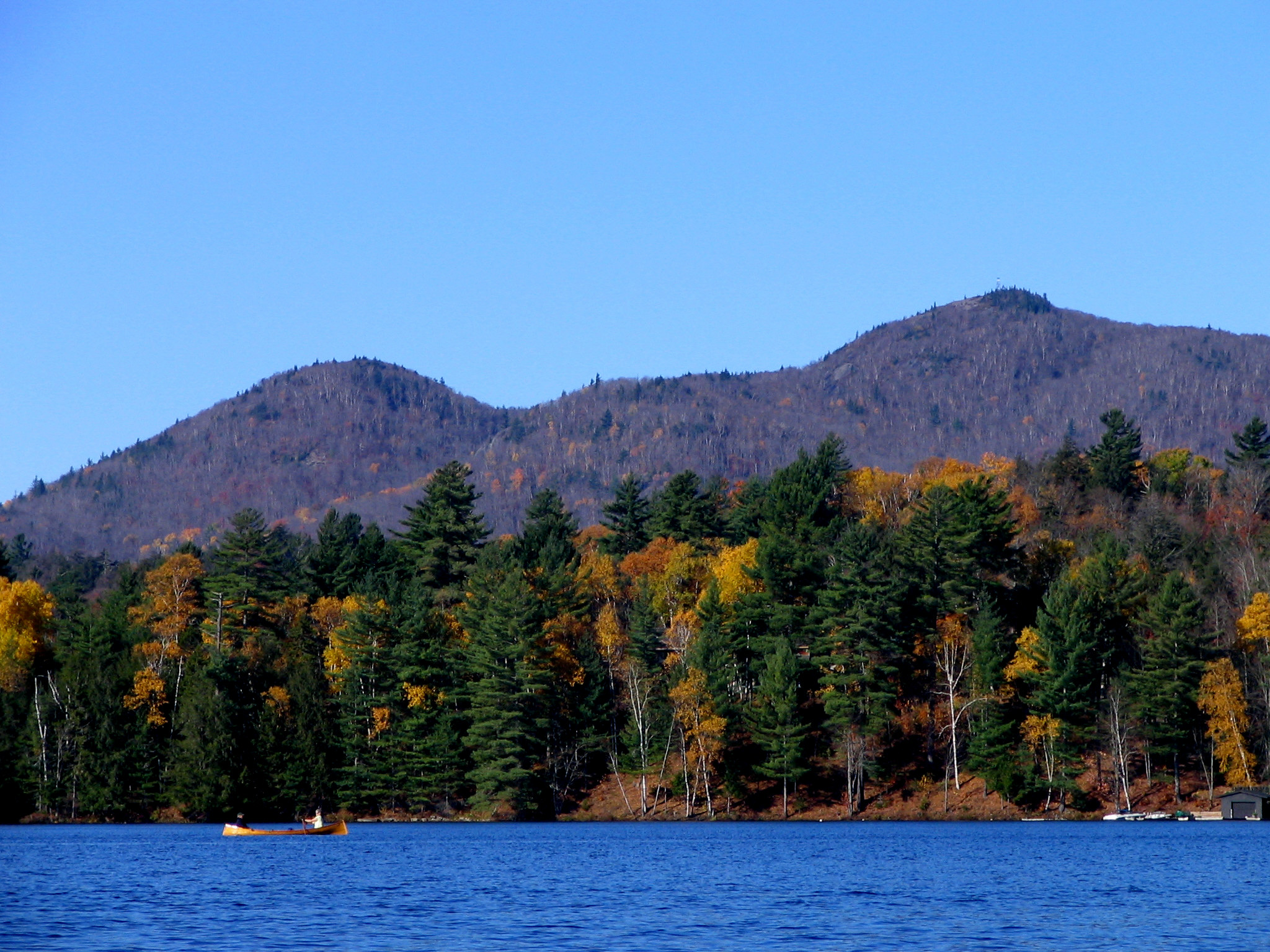
A guideboat on Upper St. Regis Lake, Saint Regis Mountain behind

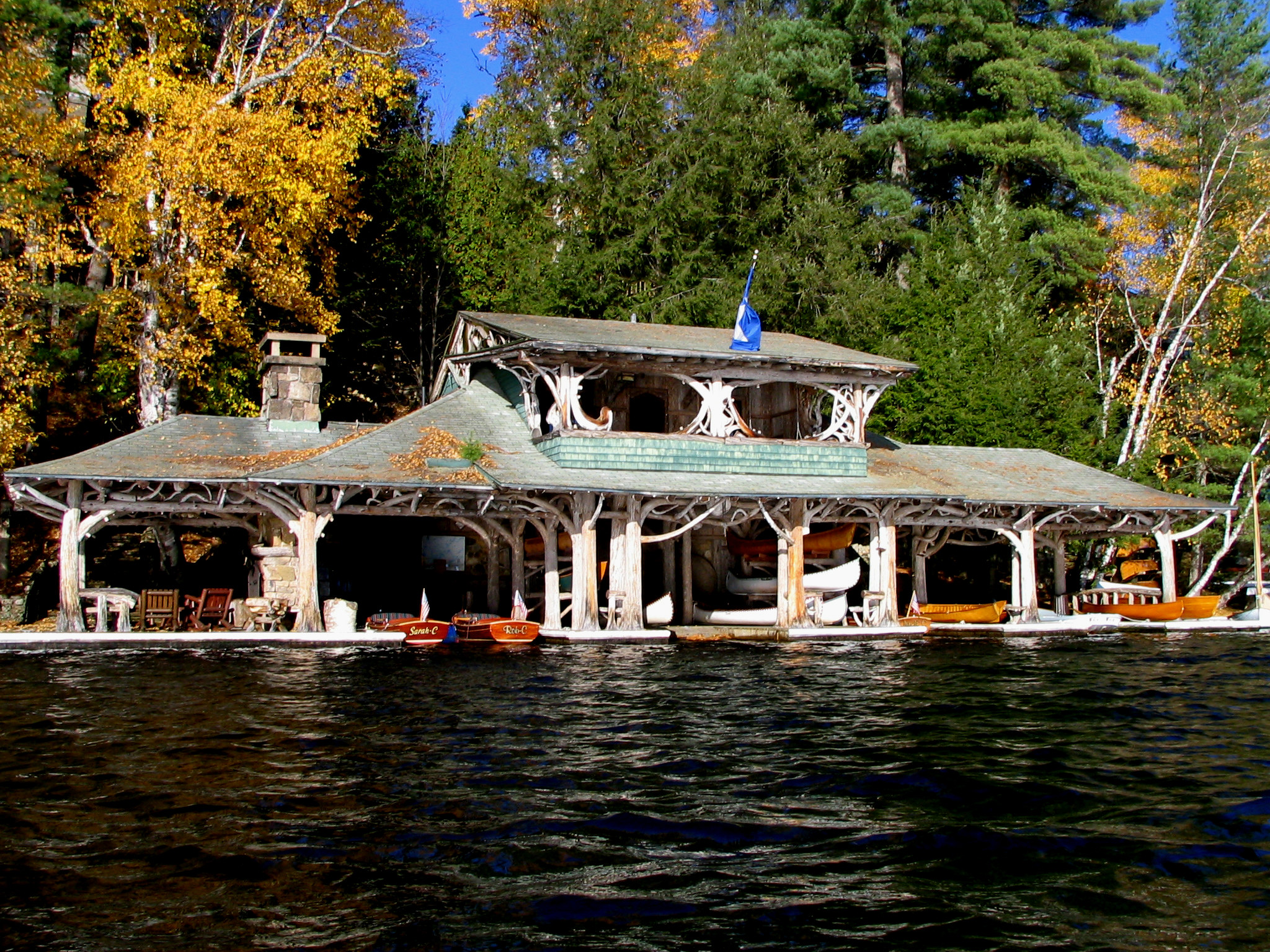
Topridge, Upper St Regis Lake

- Gabriels – A hamlet in the southeastern part of the town, located on NY-86 at the junction of County Road 30, the site of Camp Gabriels, a former minimum security state prison, which closed in 2009.
- Lower St. Regis Lake – A lake south of Paul Smiths where Paul Smith's College is located.
- Meacham Lake – A lake partly in the town at the northern town line.
- Osgood Pond – A lake northeast of Paul Smiths.
- Paul Smiths – A hamlet in the southern part of the town on NY-30.
- Rainbow Lake – (1) A hamlet near the eastern town line, north of Gabriels on County Road 60, and (2) A lake at the eastern town boundary, near the community of Rainbow Lake. Rainbow Lake flows into the North Branch of the Saranac River.
- Spitfire Lake – A lake south of Lower St. Regis Lake.
- Upper St. Regis Lake – A lake at the southern town line.
