= Apollos Smith =

Adirondacks pioneer

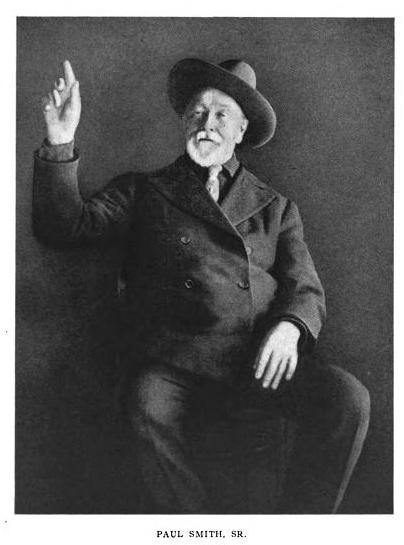
- Paul Smith from A History of the Adirondacks, by Alfred Lee Donaldson (1921)
- Born: August 20, 1825; Milton, Vermont, United States
- Died: December 15, 1912 (aged 87); Montreal, Quebec, Canada
- Occupation: Hotelier

Apollos "Paul" Smith (1825–1912) was an American hunting and fishing guide from Vermont who founded the Saint Regis House in the town of Brighton, New York, in the Adirondack Mountains. It was known universally as Paul Smith's Hotel, one of the first wilderness resorts in the Adirondacks of northern Upstate New York. In its day, it was the most fashionable of the many great Adirondack hotels, patronized by American presidents, celebrities, and the power elite of the latter half of the 19th century. It was a large operation, with 255 rooms, stables, and many other amenities.

The hamlet of Paul Smiths, New York, in the town of Brighton in Franklin County, New York, was named after the hotel. Paul Smith's College was founded at this site by a 1937 bequest from Smith's youngest son, Phelps Smith. The college opened in 1946.

== History ==
=== 19th century ===
Smith was born August 20, 1825, in Milton, Vermont. When he was 16, he left home and found work as a boatman on a canal boat on Lake Champlain; in his spare time, he went hunting and fishing in the Adirondacks, which at that time was largely wilderness with some Native American settlements. In time, Smith became known as a prominent hunting and fishing guide in the Loon Lake region.

In 1848, he rented a house on Loon Lake which he ran as a small hotel for loggers and hunters, aided by his mother and father. In 1852, Smith bought 200 acres (0.81 km^{2}) near Loon Lake on the North Branch of the Saranac River for $300. Here he built "Hunter's Home", a primitive hotel with one large living room and kitchen, and ten small sleeping quarters; the bar was self-service—a barrel of whiskey with a dipper in a corner of the living room. It was popular from the start with the doctors, lawyers and other professional men from eastern cities with whom Smith had developed a relationship as their hunting guide.

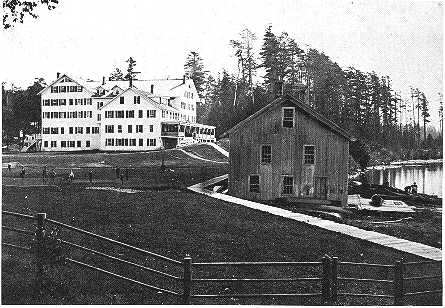
Paul Smith's Hotel, c. 1892

In 1858, some of Smith's guests suggested him to build a more comfortable hotel, one to which they could bring their wives; one offered to loan Smith the money to build it. Smith bought 50 acres (200,000 m^{2}) on Lower Saint Regis Lake, 12 miles (19 km) southwest of Loon Lake, for three hundred dollars. There, he built a hotel with seventeen bedrooms and furnishings that, while simple, were luxurious compared to others in the area. It opened in the summer of 1859. Smith was an excellent host, a charming story teller with a quick wit, and he was known for treating everyone as equals. He was also a shrewd businessman, and his wife, Lydia, whom he had married in 1859, excelled at managing the entire operation.

Smith's real estate transactions were legendary as the northern Adirondacks became increasingly desirable as a resort destination. In one transaction, he bought 13,000 acres (53 km^{2}) for twenty thousand dollars, and sold 5 acres (20,000 m^{2}) for the same price. At one point he owned 30,000 acres (120 km^{2}). When he sold land, it was generally to his wealthy clientele, many of whom built Great Camps on the nearby lakes, using lumber from Smith's mill.

The hotel expanded steadily to 255 guest rooms, and featured a bowling alley, a large casino, several dormitories for guides and other help, and a stable for 60 horses. At the same time, Smith was involved in lumbering operations, developing a sawmill, and retail stores and shops.

He established the area's first electric company, with hydroelectric plants on the St. Regis River at Keese Mill, and on the Saranac River at Franklin Falls and in the village of Saranac Lake. He built roads, and developed electric boats, recharged at his electric plant, to deliver passengers to their camps on Spitfire and Upper Saint Regis lakes. He installed telegraph lines, a stock ticker wired directly to the New York Stock Exchange, and finally, a telephone system.

=== 20th century ===
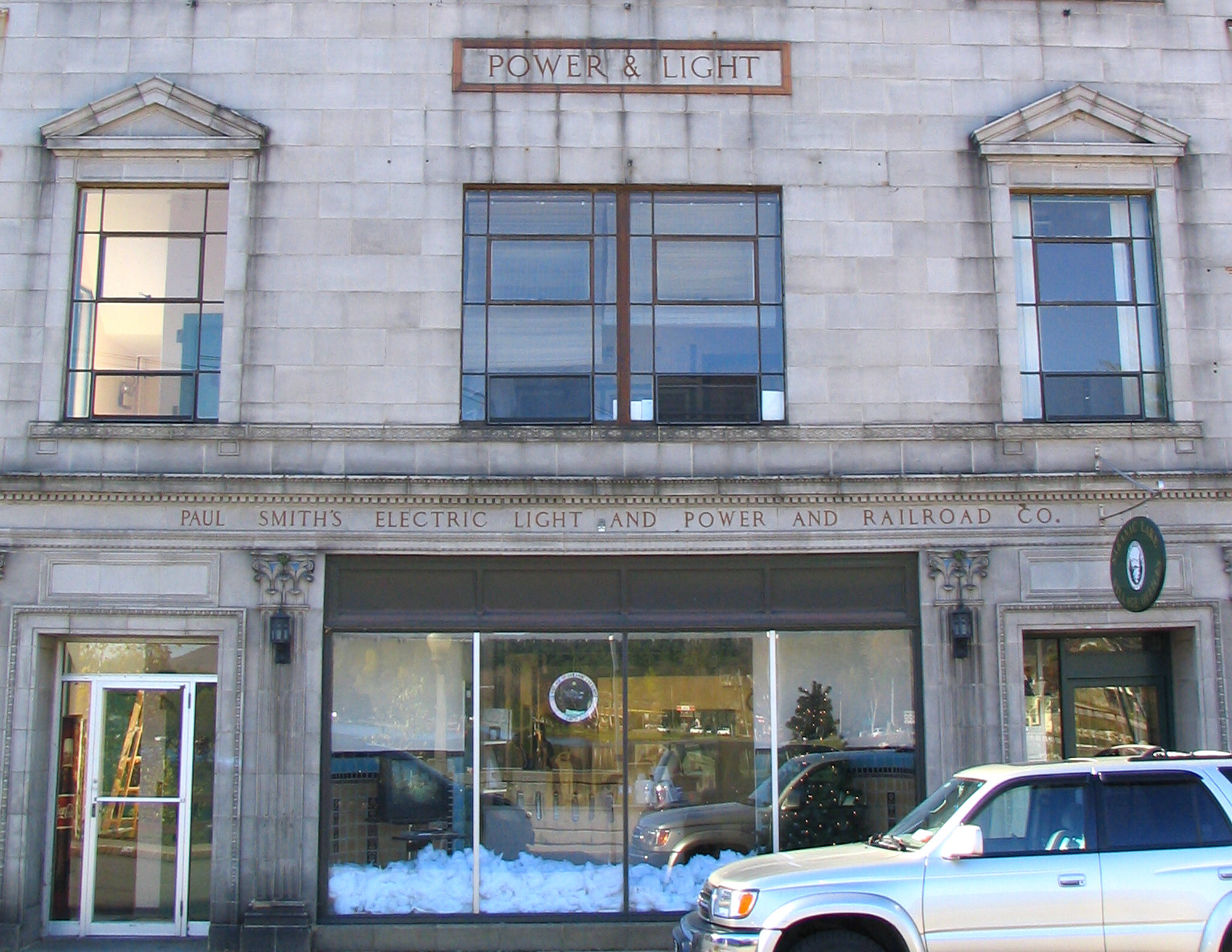
Paul Smith's Electric Light and Power and Railroad Company building in Saranac Lake, which now serves as the village offices.

In 1906, Smith built an electric railroad line seven miles (11 km) south to Lake Clear, to connect with the Mohawk and Malone Railway. Together Smith and Louis Marshall were prominent supporters in gaining the "Forever Wild" Amendment to the New York State Constitution, to preserve Adirondack Park. It went into effect on January 1, 1895.

The lands of the state, now owned or hereafter acquired, constituting the forest preserve as now fixed by law, shall be forever kept as wild forest lands. They shall not be leased, sold or exchanged, or be taken by any corporation, public or private, nor shall the timber thereon be sold, removed or destroyed.

Guests of the hotel included US Presidents Benjamin Harrison, Grover Cleveland, Theodore Roosevelt and Calvin Coolidge, as well as P. T. Barnum, E. H. Harriman, Whitelaw Reid, J. P. Morgan and Anson Phelps Stokes.

Smith died on December 15, 1912, at the Royal Victoria Hospital in Montreal, Quebec, Canada, after two consecutive kidney operations; he was 87. He and his wife had three sons: Henry, who died at age 29; Paul Jr., who died in 1920; and Phelps Smith, who continued managing the hotel until it burned down in 1930. When Phelps Smith died, his will provided funds to start Paul Smith's College, which was built on the site of the hotel. The first class was matriculated in 1946.

== Gallery ==
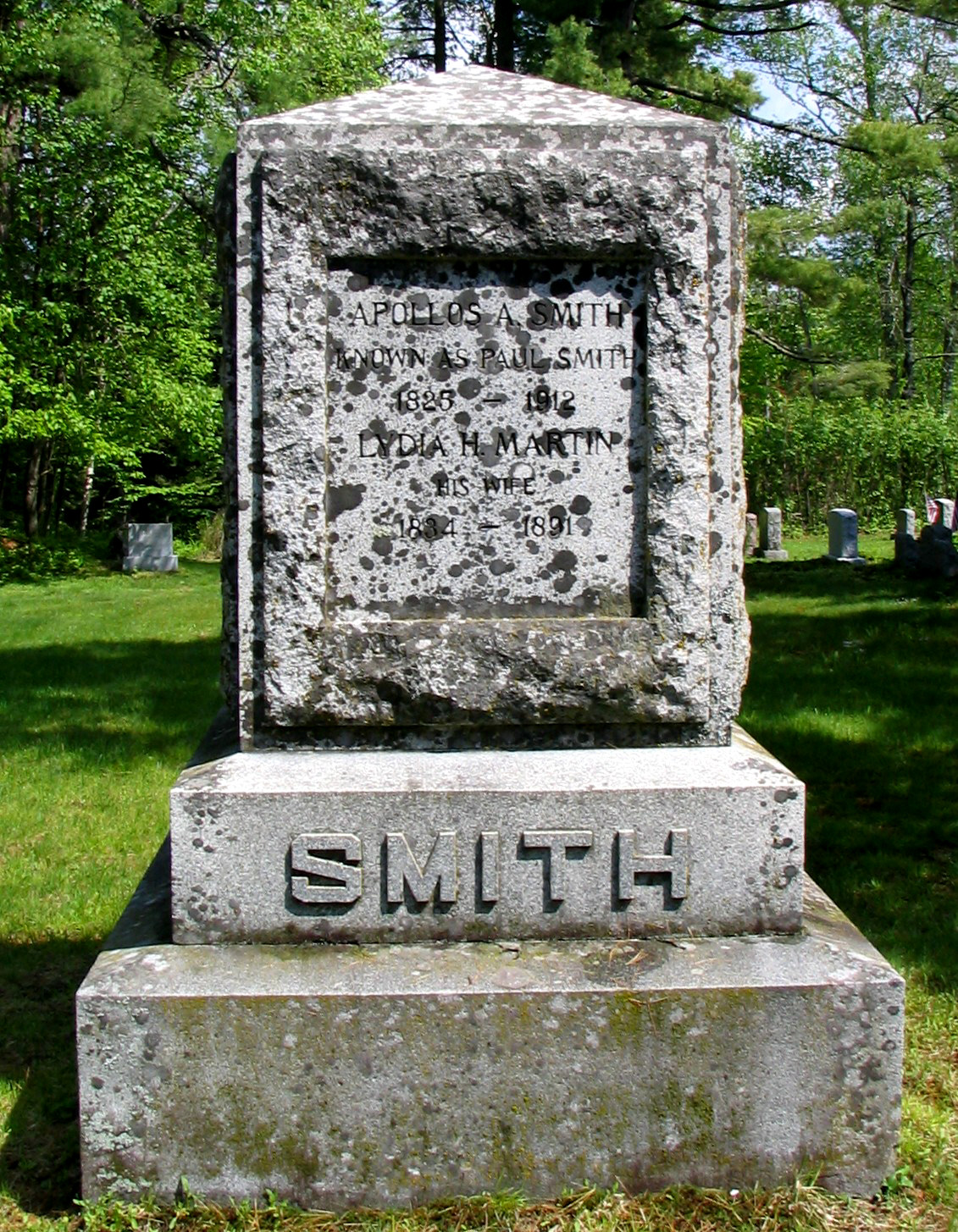
Paul and Lydia Smith's gravestone at nearby St. John's in the Wilderness Episcopal Church. He donated the land on which the church stands.

== See also ==
- Paul Smith's College
- Paul Smith's Electric Light and Power and Railroad Company Complex
- Paul Smiths, New York
