= Seven Carries =

Historic canoe route in southern Franklin County, New York, United States

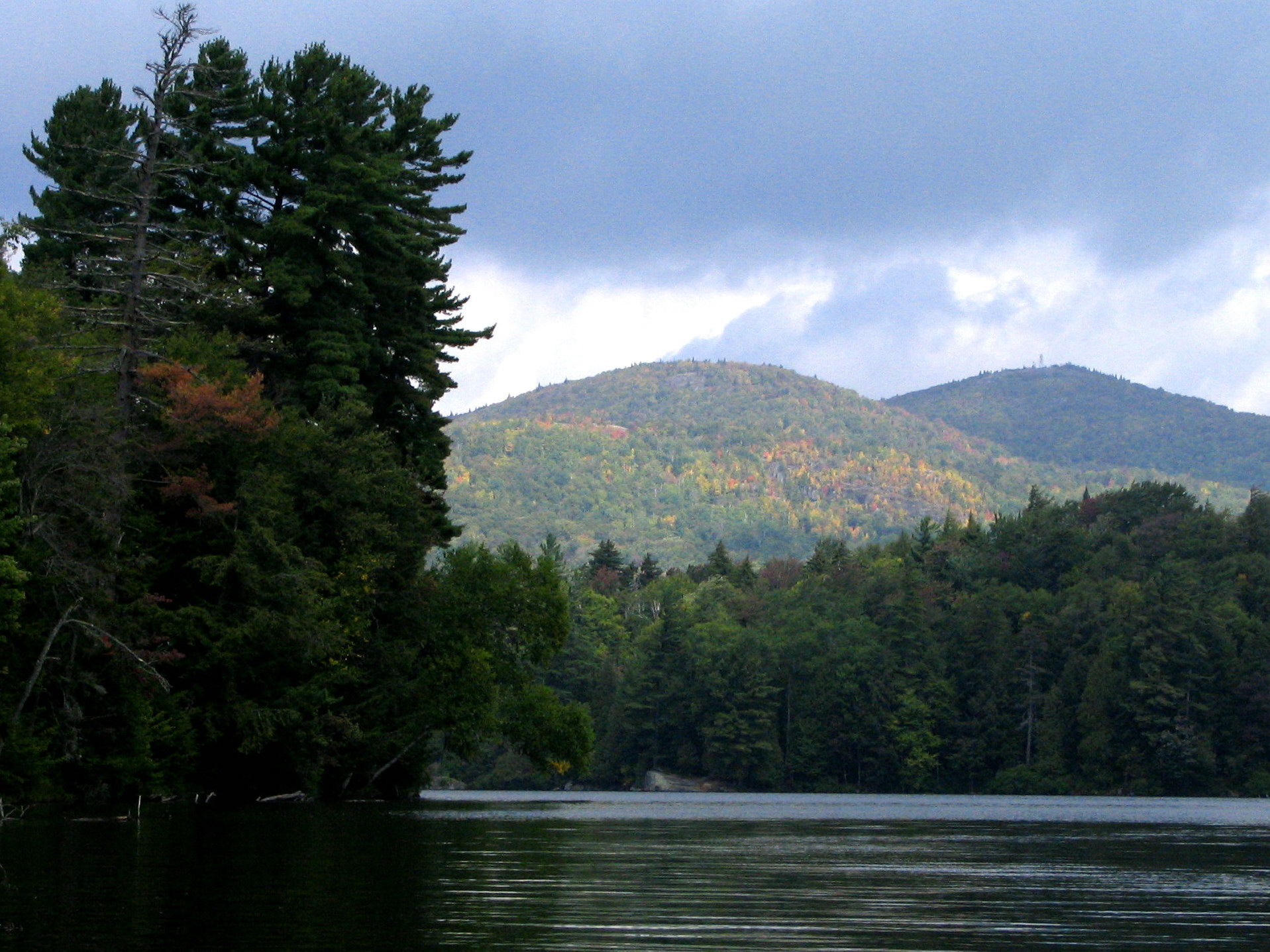
Saint Regis Mountain, from Saint Regis Pond

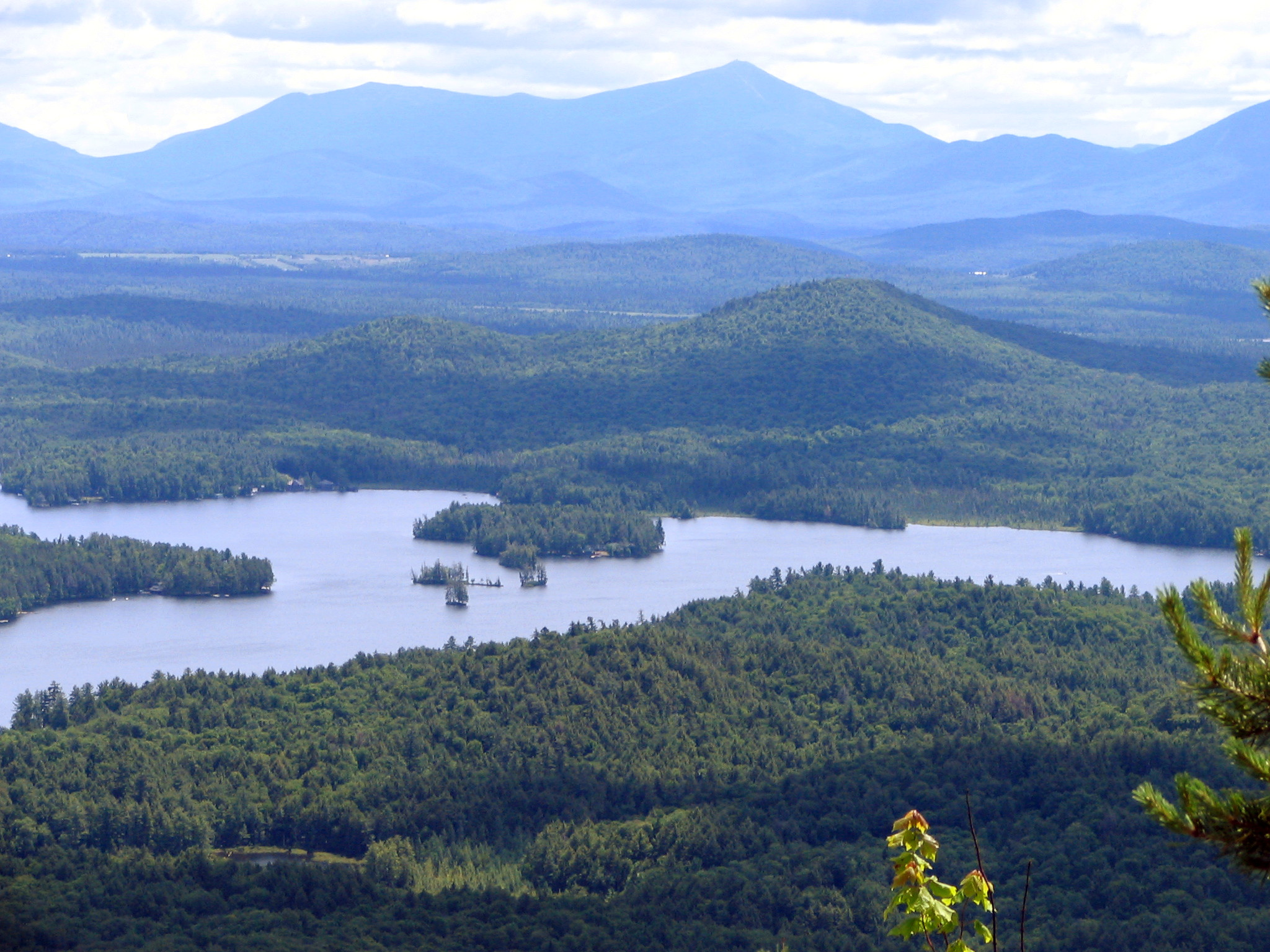
View from Saint Regis Mountain of Upper Saint Regis Lake, with the High Peaks in the distance

The Seven Carries is an historic canoe route from Paul Smith's Hotel to the Saranac Inn through what is now known as the Saint Regis Canoe Area in southern Franklin County, New York, in the Adirondack Park. The route was famous with sportsmen and tourists from major east-coast cities from the late 19th century through the 1930s; interest has revived in recent years. Despite the name, the route consists of only six carries, or portages.

The route is nine miles (14 km) long and crosses seven wilderness ponds and three lakes. It used to connect two popular Adirondack hotels— Paul Smith's Hotel, built in 1859 and burned in 1930, now the site of Paul Smith's College, and the Saranac Inn, built in 1864 and burned in 1978, now the site of a public golf course as well as the hotel.

From Saranac Inn (44°20′46″N 74°19′5″W), the route traditionally started via a horse-drawn wagon ride to Little Green Pond. Today, after a short drive over the Fish Hatchery Road from NY-30, one can put in on Little Green and then carry 220 yards (200 m) to Little Clear Pond, or put in directly on Little Clear. The paddle to the Saint Regis Pond carry is 1.5 miles (2.4 km). Little Clear is used by the State Fish Hatchery, and no fishing or camping is allowed. The carry from Little Clear to Saint Regis Pond is the longest of the trip, at 0.6 miles (0.97 km). At 400 acres (1.6 km^{2}), Saint Regis Pond is the largest pond on the route, and is well worth exploring; the carry to Green Pond can be reached by a paddle of 1.2 miles (1.9 km).

From Saint Regis Pond, it is a 200 yards (180 m) carry to Green Pond, which is only 0.2 miles (0.32 km) wide. Next is a 0.15-mile (0.24 km) carry to 1-mile-long (1.6 km) Little Long Pond. A 0.15-mile (0.24 km) carry brings one to Bear Pond, which is only 0.4 miles (0.64 km) wide. Finally, the two less than 100-yard (91 m) carries and an equally short paddle across Bog Pond (no longer in the Canoe Area) bring one to Upper Saint Regis Lake, home of many Adirondack Great Camps, including Camp Topridge.

Upper Saint Regis Lake connects to Spitfire Lake and Lower Saint Regis Lake, the site of Paul Smith's Hotel (44°26′04″N 074°15′07″W), three miles (4.8 km) from the end of the last carry. Alternatively, one can take out at the Saint Regis Carry in the southeast corner of Lower Saint Regis, 0.6 miles (0.97 km) from the end of the last carry

There are campsites on Saint Regis, Green, Little Long, and Bear Ponds.
