= Saint Regis Canoe Area =

Wilderness canoe area in the US

St. Regis Canoe Area
- IUCN category Ib (wilderness area)
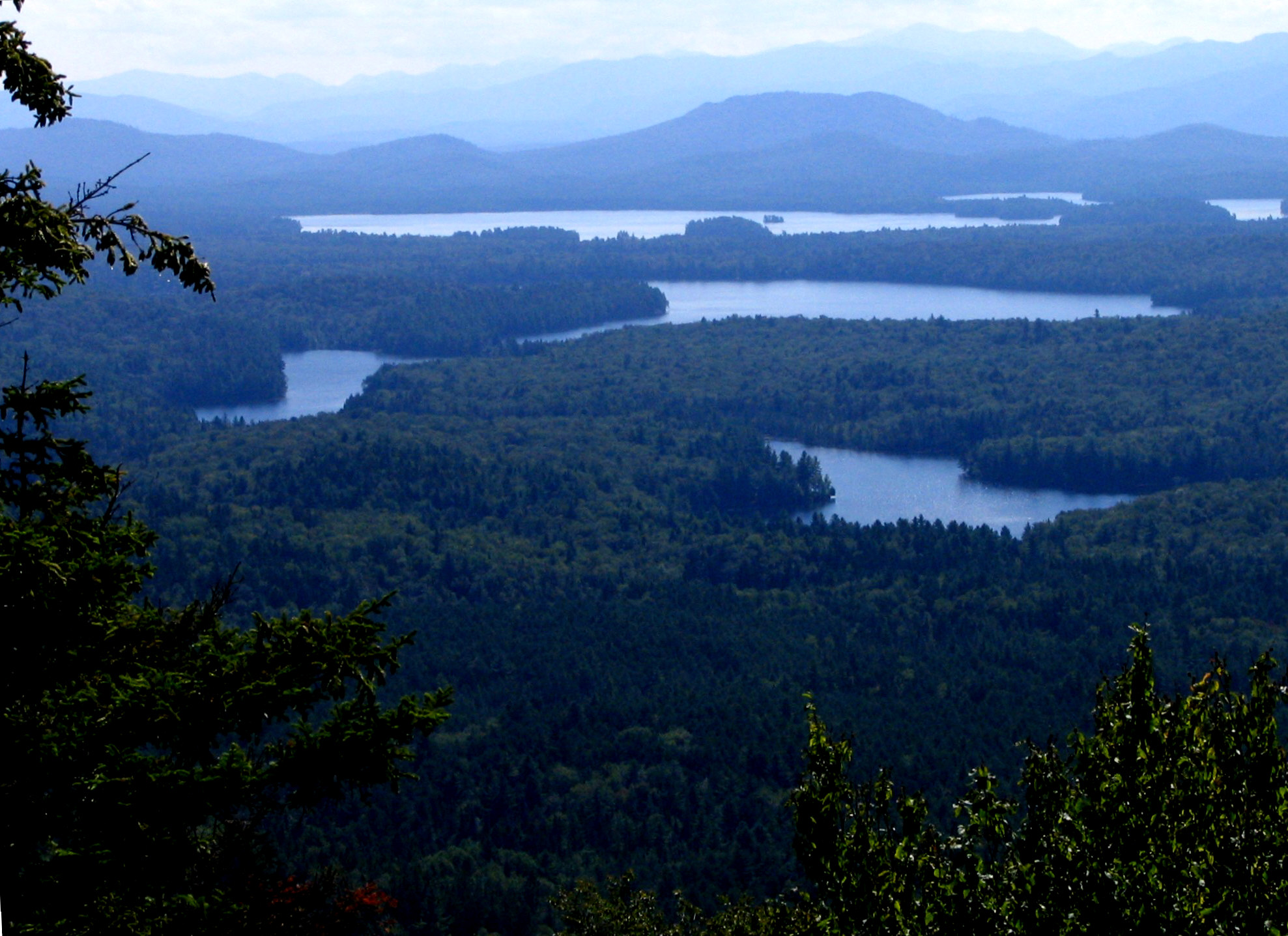
- View from Long Pond Mountain of lakes in the St. Regis Canoe Area
- Interactive map of St. Regis Canoe Area
- Location: Adirondack Park, New York, United States
- Nearest city: Paul Smiths, New York
- Coordinates: 44°24′40″N 74°19′29″W
- Area: 29.5 sq mi (76 km^{2})
- Governing body: New York State Department of Environmental Conservation, Adirondack Park Agency

The Saint Regis Canoe Area in Adirondack Park is the largest wilderness canoe area in the Northeastern United States and the only designated canoe area in New York state. It is closed to motorized vehicles. Among the 50 ponds (small lakes) and lakes are Upper Saint Regis Lake, part of the Seven Carries route, and Saint Regis Pond. It contains the headwaters of the West and Middle Branch of the Saint Regis and the Saranac Rivers. Only two of the lakes can be reached without a portage, or carry as it is known in the region. Primitive canoe camping is permitted on many of the lakes and ponds. Saint Regis Mountain and Long Pond Mountain are within the area.

The area covers 18,400 acre (76 km^{2}) in southern Franklin County, New York between Tupper Lake and Paul Smiths.
