= Saint Regis Pond =

Pond in the Adirondacks, New York State, USA

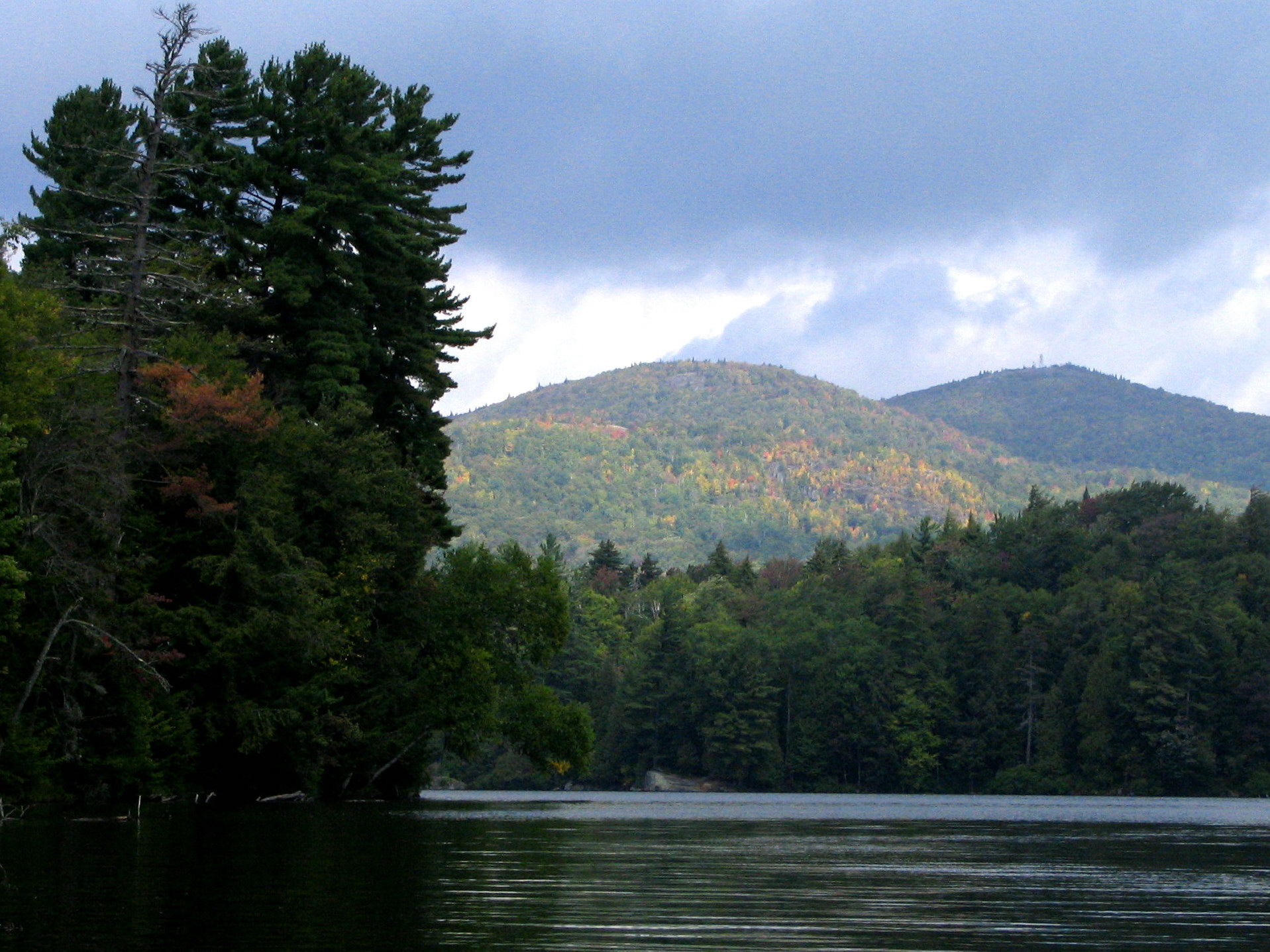
- Saint Regis Mountain (right), from Saint Regis Pond

- Location within New York Location within the United States
- Location: Franklin County, New York
- Coordinates: 44°22′52″N 74°18′57″W
- Type: Pond
- Primary outflows: St. Regis River
- Max. length: 1.6 miles (2.6 km)
- Surface area: 388-acre (1.57 km^{2})
- Islands: 4

Saint Regis Pond is a 388-acre (1.57 km^{2}) pond, the largest in the Saint Regis Canoe Area in the Adirondacks in northern New York state. It drains into the west branch of the St. Regis River. It is part of the "Seven Carries" canoe route.

The pond is 1.6 miles (2.6 km) long. There are four small islands and several designated campsites. Saint Regis Pond can only be reached by one or more carries from other ponds in the Canoe Area; the shortest route is via a 0.6-mile (0.97 km) carry from Little Clear Pond after a 1.5-mile (2.4 km) paddle from the parking area on Floodwood Road.
