= Camp Gabriels =

Minimum security state prison in New York, US

Coordinates: 44°26′15″N 74°11′11″W

Camp Gabriels was a minimum security state prison, located in northern New York. This prison was located in the village of Gabriels in the Town of Brighton in Franklin County. The location of the former prison is inside the Adirondack Park on 'Forever Wild' Forest Preserve land. New York State Forest Preserve land is protected by Section 1 of Article 14 of the New York State Constitution (the "forever wild" clause). Camp Gabriels does not meet any of the exceptions to those provisions.

The prison was a conversion of a former tuberculosis sanatorium, which opened in 1897 and was named for Bishop Henry Gabriels. The sanatorium later became part of nearby Paul Smith's College before the state government purchased the facility in 1982 to house the prison.

Most prisoners worked on forestry-related projects and received instruction from conservation officers. They also performed tasks in nearby communities such as mowing grass and clearing snow. Governor Eliot Spitzer announced 11 January 2008, that he planned to close the camp along with three other facilities due to the state's budget problems. At its peak, Camp Gabriels housed 336 inmates but only held 186 at the time of the announcement.

On 15 April 2009, officials announced that the facility would close 1 July 2009, and the current population of 78 inmates and 104 staff members would be disbursed to other correction facilities.

The Office of General Services attempted to sell the property in November 2010 but failed to receive any bids above the set minimum of $950,000. A second auction in April 2011 was also unsuccessful. It announced a third sale in October 2013 for the 336-bed, 92-acre facility with a minimum bid of $90,000.

A New York City businessman submitted the winning bid of $166,000 and said he hoped, to transform the prison into a year-round group camp and retreat center. Because the facility sits on New York State Forest Preserve land, the buyer has not been able to obtain title insurance and the sale is in limbo as of June 2016.

== See also ==
- List of New York state prisons
