= Meenahga Mountain =

Mountain in New York, United States

- Location within New York Adirondack Park Location within the United States

Highest point
- Elevation: 2,087 feet (636 m)
- Coordinates: 44°29′43″N 74°09′18″W

Geography
- Location: NE of Paul Smiths, Franklin County, New York, U.S.
- Topo map: USGS Gabriels

Meenahga Mountain is a 2,087-foot-tall (636 m) mountain located in Adirondack Mountains of New York. It is located in the northeast of the hamlet of Paul Smiths in Franklin County. The mountain is the site of a 73-foot-tall (22 m) Aermotor LS40 fire lookout tower.

== History ==
In 1927, Conservation Department Forest Ranger Albert Tebeau built a 73-foot-tall (22 m) Aermotor LS40 tower on the mountain for the Adirondack-Florida School. Ranger Tebeau built most of the early fire observation stations in the northern Adirondack Mountains. The tower was mostly used for the school, but was used as a fire observation station in times of high fire danger through an agreement with the New York State Department of Environmental Conservation. The tower still remains but is on private land and is closed to the public.
