= Gabriels, New York =

- hamlet
- Location within the state of New York
- Coordinates: 44°25′55″N 74°10′53″W
- Country: United States
- State: New York
- County: Franklin
- Town: Brighton
- Elevation: 1,699 ft (518 m)
- Time zone: UTC-5 (Eastern (EST))
  - Summer (DST): UTC-4 (EDT)
- ZIP code: 12939
- Area code: 518

Gabriels is a hamlet in the town of Brighton in Franklin County, New York, United States, inside the Adirondack Park near Paul Smiths. The village developed around a tuberculosis cure facility, the Gabriels Sanatorium, which was opened in 1897 by the Catholic Sisters of Mercy. The land was donated by Paul Smith and W. Seward Webb. The site was later purchased by Paul Smith's College. The site was sold to the Department of Corrections in 1982. The Department of Corrections' Camp Gabriels closed in 2009.

Both the sanatorium and the hamlet were named for Henry Gabriels, a Belgian-born prelate who served as bishop of the Roman Catholic Diocese of Ogdensburg. The hamlet developed as the commercial center on a train depot serving the Adirondack Division of the New York Central line. The station existed primarily to deliver vacationers to the nearby resort at Paul Smiths. In 1961, the New York Central abandoned the Adirondack Division from Malone Junction to Gabriels.

Today, the hamlet remains the commercial center for the town of Brighton, with a post office, small businesses, a Catholic church, and farms.
