= Paul Smith's Electric Light and Power and Railroad Company Complex =

- U.S. National Register of Historic Places
- U.S. Historic district
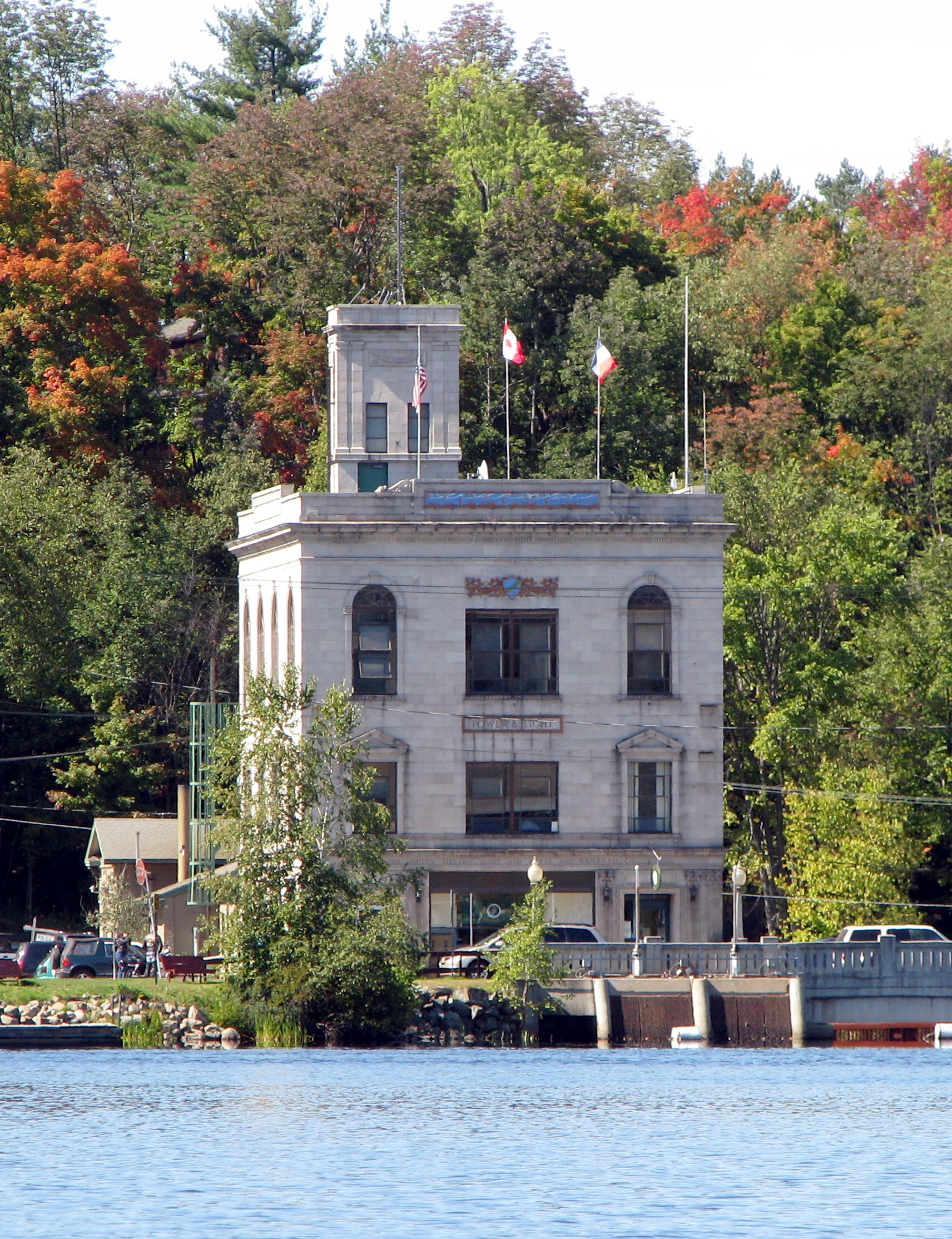
- Paul Smith's Electric Light and Power and Railroad Company office building, September 2008

- Location within New York Location within the United States
- Location: 2 Main St., Saranac Lake, New York
- Coordinates: 44°19′27″N 74°7′57″W
- Area: 2 acres (0.81 ha)
- Built: 1908
- Architectural style: Classical Revival
- NRHP reference No.: 87001898
- Added to NRHP: November 2, 1987

Paul Smith's Electric Light and Power and Railroad Company Complex is a national historic district located at Saranac Lake in Franklin County, New York. It contains two contributing buildings (a powerhouse and an office building) and two contributing structures (a dam and a bridge). The powerhouse was built in 1908-1909 and is a one-story, single room brick building on a stone foundation measuring 40 feet by 55 feet. The office building was built in 1927 and is a three-story steel and masonry building with a terra cotta exterior. It is three bays wide by four bays deep. The Main Street Bridge is a concrete slab bridge built between 1924 and 1931. The Lake Flower Dam and Power Flume was built between 1936 and 1938 with Works Progress Administration assistance.

It was listed on the National Register of Historic Places in 1987.
