= Spitfire Lake =

- Location within New York
- Location: Franklin County, New York
- Coordinates: 44°24′57″N 74°16′20″W
- Type: lake
- Surface area: 250-acre (1.0 km^{2})

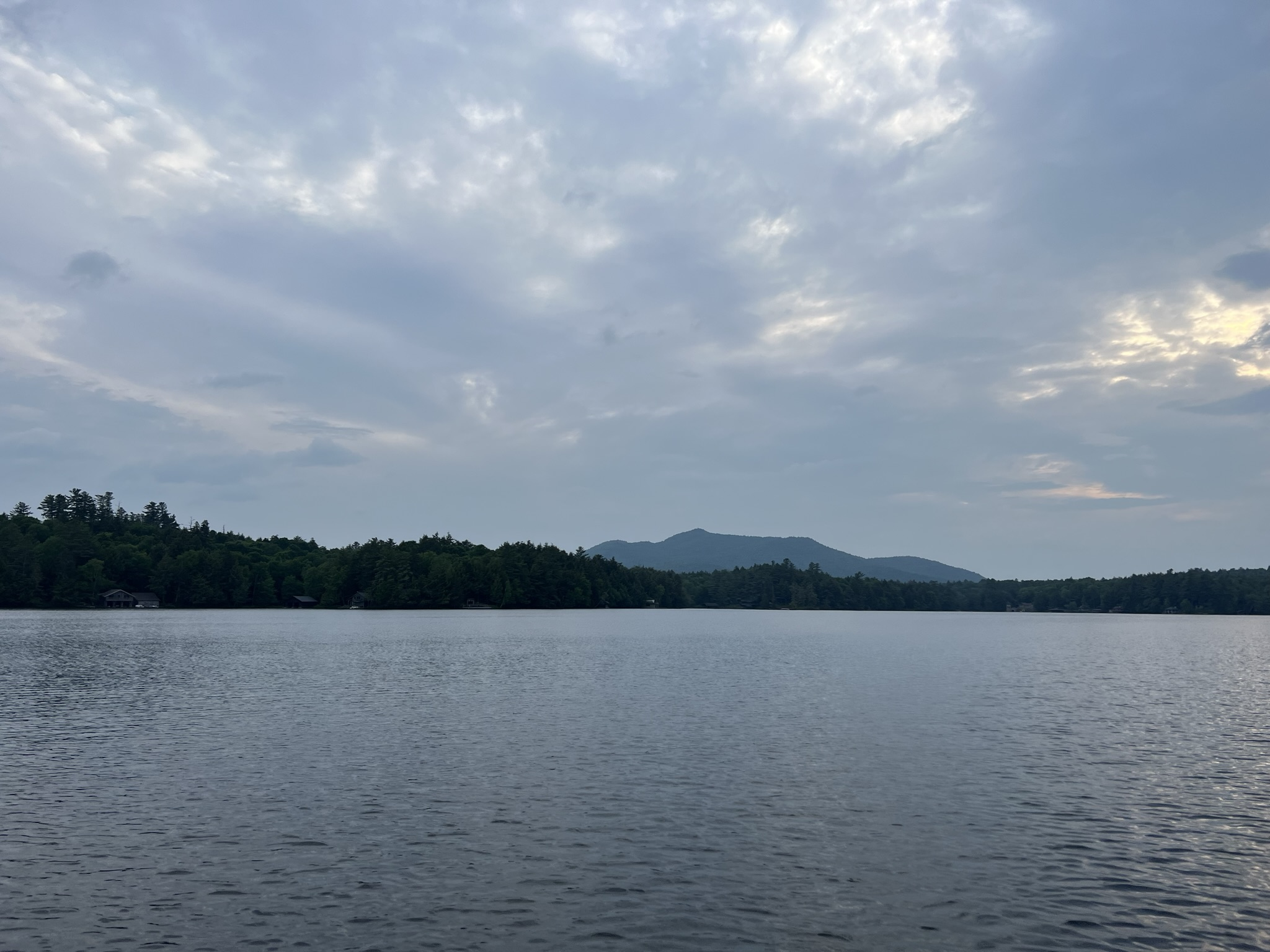
St. Regis Mountain from Spitfire Lake

Spitfire Lake is a part of the St. Regis River in the Adirondacks in northern New York State and is 250-acre (1.0 km^{2}) in area. Along with Upper and Lower St. Regis Lake, it became well-known in the late 19th century as a summer playground of America's power elite, drawn to the area by its scenery and by the "rustic charms" of Paul Smith's Hotel. It is the site of a number of grand old summer "cottages" and Great Camps; Frederick W. Vanderbilt, Anson Phelps Stokes and Whitelaw Reid were among the summer residents. "The camps of many of these families began as tent colonies, with separate units for sleeping, dining, games, and so on, and evolved into permanent structures built with understated taste".

Spitfire is part of the original Seven Carries canoe route from Paul Smith's Hotel to Saranac Inn.

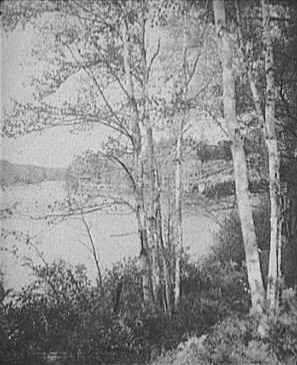
The Inlet, Spitfire Lake, 1903

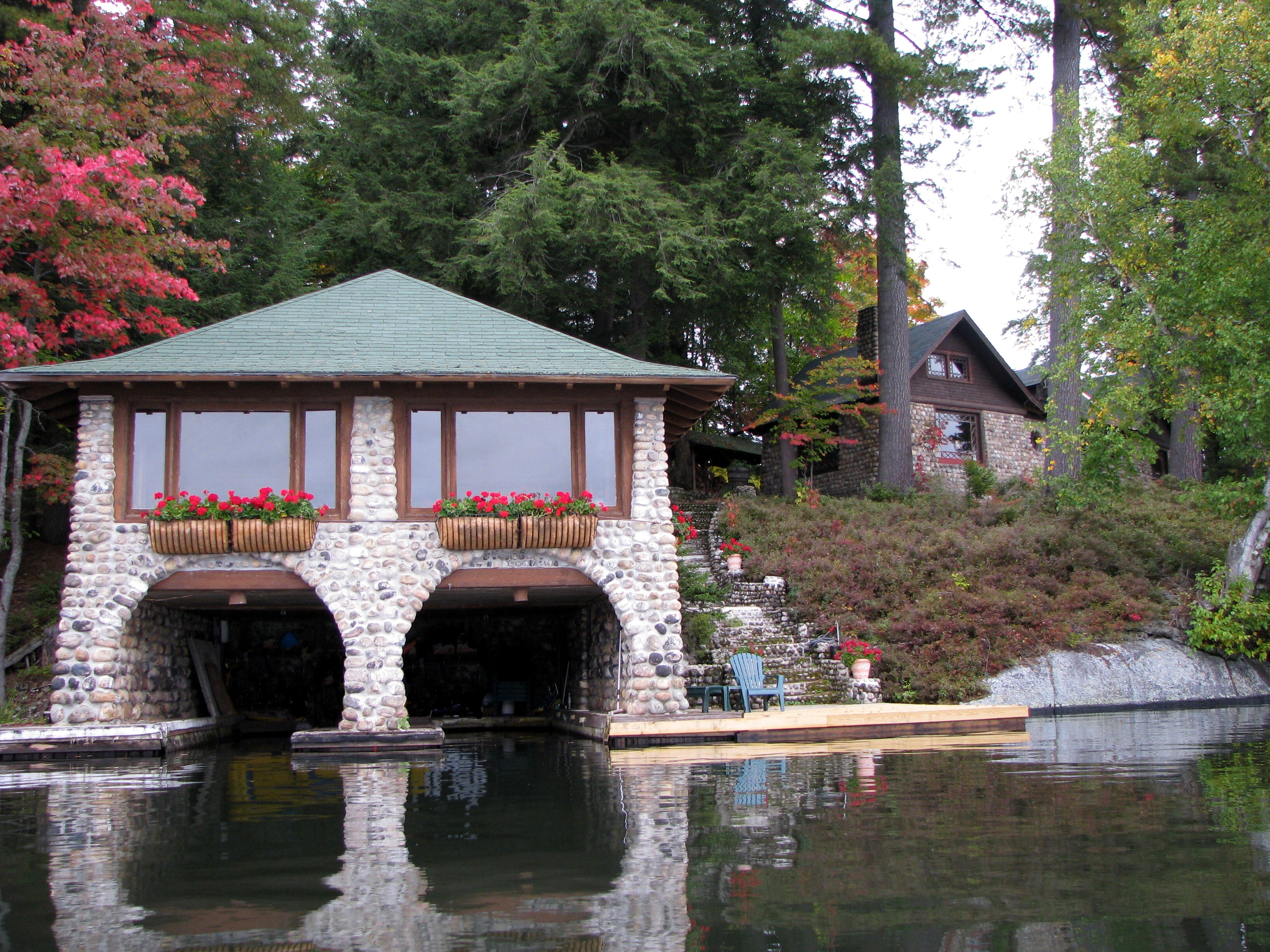
A "Camp" on Spitfire Lake

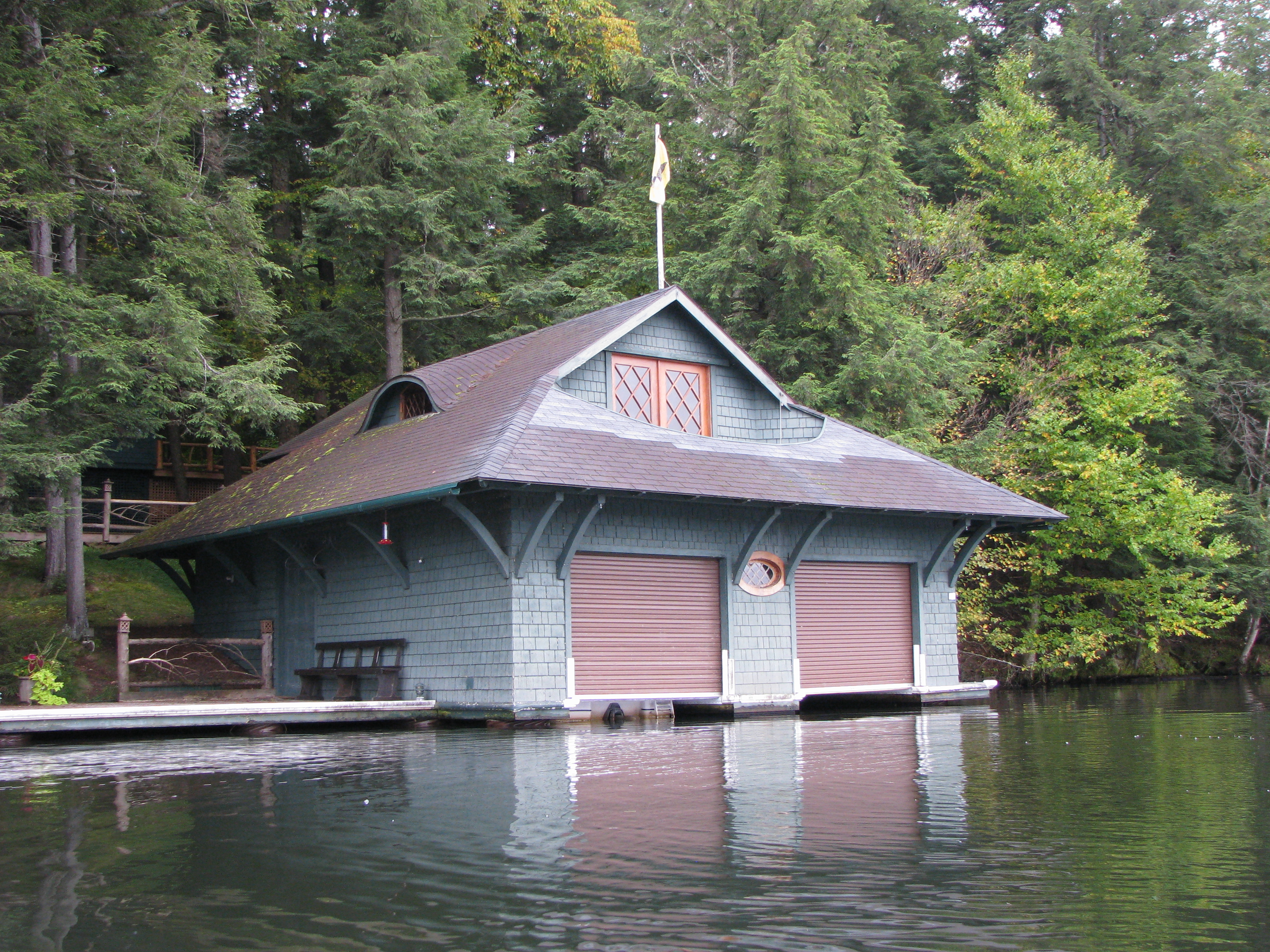
Boat house on Spitfire Lake

== Sources ==
- Donaldson, Alfred L., A History of the Adirondacks. New York: Century, 1921. ISBN 0-916346-26-9. (reprint)
- Jerome, Christine Adirondack Passage: Cruise of Canoe Sairy Gamp, HarperCollins, 1994. ISBN 0-935272-94-1.
