= Paul Smith's Hotel =

Historic hotel in New York State, U.S.

Coordinates: 44°26′04″N 074°15′07″W

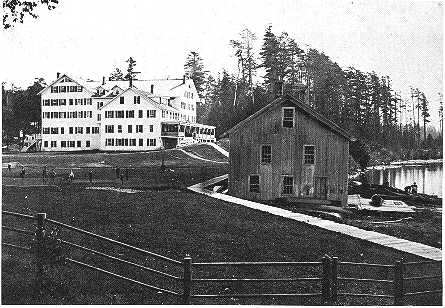
Paul Smith's Hotel, circa 1880s

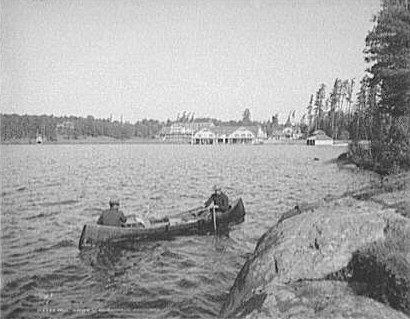
Guide boat, Lower Saint Regis Lake, Paul Smith's in background, 1903

Paul Smith's Hotel, (1859–1930) formally known as the Saint Regis House, was founded in 1859 by Apollos (Paul) Smith in the town of Brighton, Franklin County, New York, in what would become the village of Paul Smiths.

One of the first wilderness resorts in Adirondacks, it was, in its day, the most fashionable of the many great Adirondack hotels, patronized by American presidents Grover Cleveland, Theodore Roosevelt and Calvin Coolidge, celebrities like P.T. Barnum, and the power elite of the latter half of the 19th century, such as E. H. Harriman and Whitelaw Reid.

In 1860, an article titled "Shooting in the Adirondack" was published in the periodical "All the Year Round." The article, the author of which remains unknown, describes a hunting trip the writer took at the Paul Smith's Hotel in 1859 led by Apollos Smith "and one Warren for the woods". This was Stephen Warren Morehouse recorded in the 1860 US Census as an employee of the Paul Smith's Hotel and who later served in the Massachusetts 54th Colored Infantry Regiment.

For years the hotel was kept intentionally primitive, offering neither bellboys nor indoor bathrooms. It started as a seventeen-room inn, though by the start of the 20th century it would grow to 255 rooms with a boathouse with quarters for sixty guides, stables, a casino, a bowling alley, and a wire to the New York Stock Exchange. It also had woodworking, blacksmith, and electrical shops, a sawmill and a store. Stagecoaches delivered guests to the hotel until 1906, when a short electric railroad connected it to the nearest main line.

Smith died in 1912, but the hotel continued under his son, Phelps, until it burned down in 1930.

== See also ==
- Upper St. Regis Lake
- Spitfire Lake
- Seven Carries
- Adirondack Architecture

== Sources ==
- Donaldson, Alfred L., A History of the Adirondacks. New York: Century, 1921. OCLC 1383265. (reprint)
- Jerome, Christine Adirondack Passage: Cruise of Canoe Sairy Gamp, HarperCollins, 1994. ISBN 0-935272-94-1.
