= Rainbow Lake, New York =

- Hamlet
- Location within New York Location within the United States
- Coordinates: 44°28′01″N 74°10′23″W
- Country: United States
- State: New York
- County: Franklin
- Elevation: 1,690 ft (520 m)
- Time zone: UTC-5 (Eastern (EST))
  - Summer (DST): UTC-4 (EDT)
- ZIP code: 12976
- Area codes: 518 & 838
- GNIS feature ID: 970511

Rainbow Lake is a hamlet in Franklin County, New York, United States. The community is 9.7 miles (15.6 km) north of Saranac Lake. Rainbow Lake has a post office with ZIP code 12976, which opened on July 8, 1884.
