= Lower St. Regis Lake =

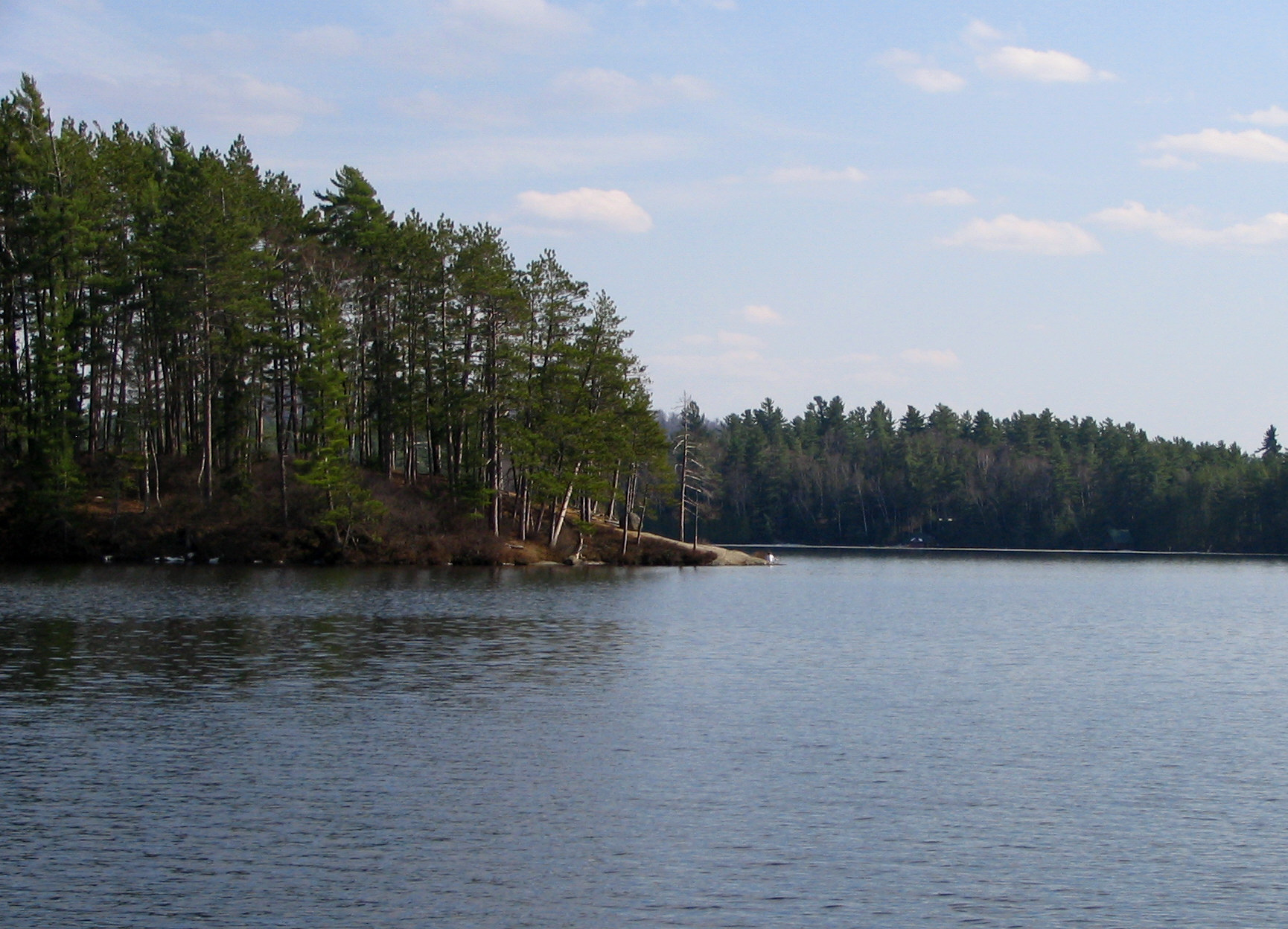
- View of Lower St. Regis Lake from the shore of Paul Smith's College

- Location within New York Lower St. Regis Lake (the United States)
- Location: Town of Brighton, Franklin County, New York
- Coordinates: 44°25′43″N 74°15′12″W
- Type: Proglacial Lake
- Primary outflows: St. Regis River
- Catchment area: 20.71 mi^{2} (5,363 ha)
- Basin countries: United States
- Max. length: 1.16 miles (1.87 km)
- Max. width: .087 miles (0.140 km)
- Surface area: 350 acres (140 ha)
- Average depth: 16.8 ft (5.1 m)
- Max. depth: 38 ft (12 m)

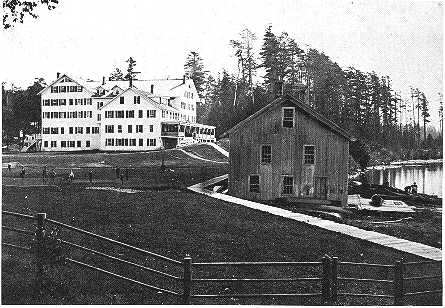
Paul Smith's Hotel, circa 1892, Lower St. Regis Lake, at right.

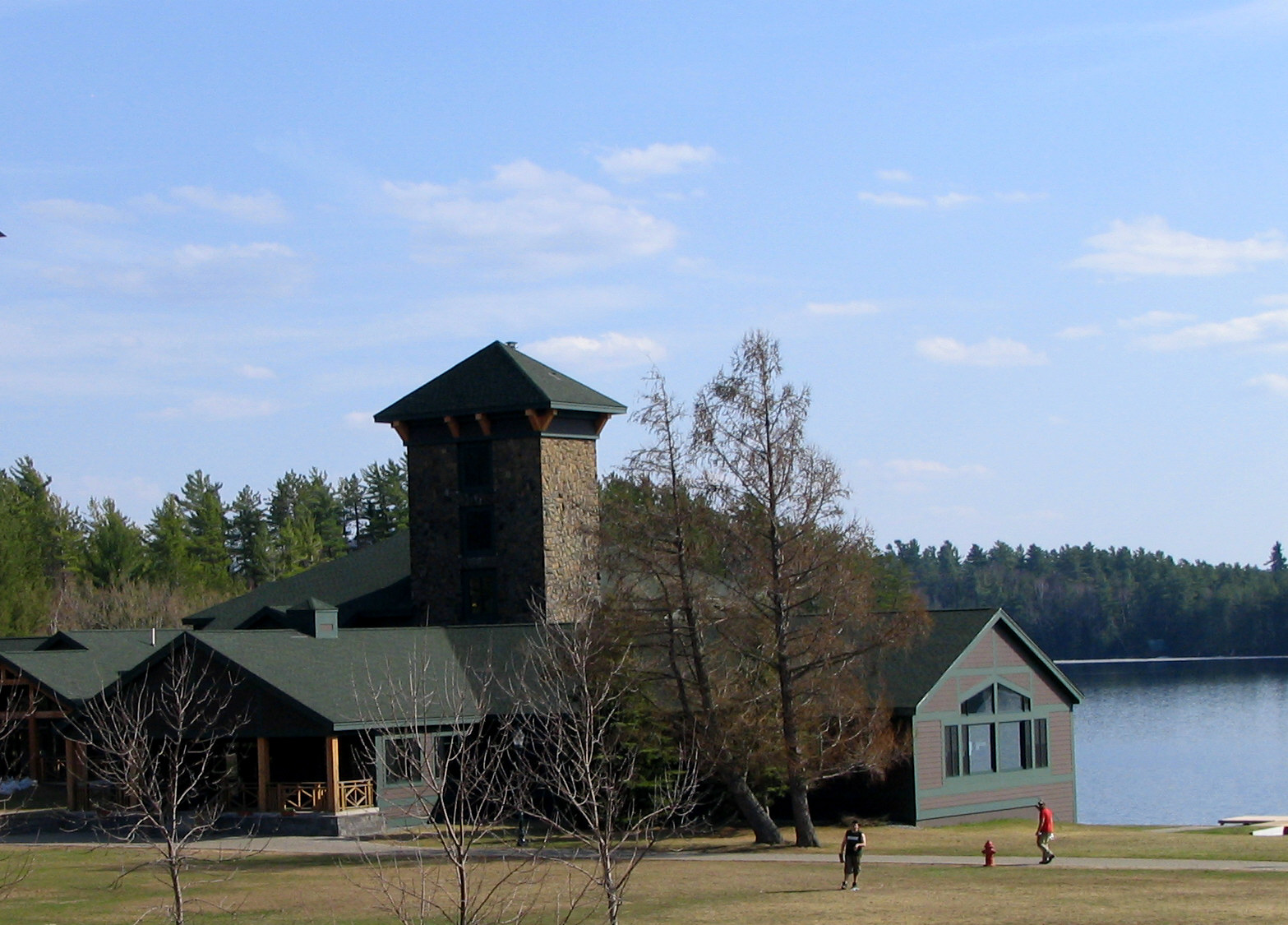
Paul Smith's College, Dining hall/Student Center

Lower St. Regis Lake is a part of the St. Regis River in the Adirondacks in northern New York State. At its northern edge is Paul Smith's College, former site of Paul Smith's Hotel. Along with Upper St. Regis Lake and Spitfire Lake, it became famous in the late 19th century as a summer playground of America's power elite, drawn to the area by its scenery and by the rustic charms of Paul Smith's Hotel. It is the site of St. John's in the Wilderness, a small chapel originally built of logs, that was formerly attended by the families of shoreline property owners that arrived in canoes, rowboats and sailboats.

Paul Smith's College maintains several lean-tos on the lake. The college is the start of the famous Seven Carries canoe route.

The lake lies in the town of Brighton.

== Hydrology ==
Lower St. Regis Lake is part of the St. Regis Chain of Lakes. Water flows north from Upper St. Regis Lake, through Spitfire Lake, and finally through a 2,000 foot (610 m) long channel known as "the slough" into Lower St. Regis Lake. The lake has a surface area of 350 acres (140 ha) and has a maximum depth of 38 feet (12 m). Lower St. Regis Lake's water level was impacted in 1851 when a dam was built to power a sawmill.

The lake's water quality is heavily impacted by road salt runoff, with chloride concentrations at 27mg/L or 135 times the background level.

=== Watershed characteristics ===
The watershed area is 5,363 hectares (20.71 mi^{2}) with the lake perimeter being 7.1 kilometres (4.4 mi). There are 10 km of state roads and 13.4 kilometres (8.3 mi) of state roads that run through it. The watershed area consists of 35% deciduous forest, 28% evergreen forest, 3% mixed forest, 13% wetlands, 17% surface water, and 3% residential area.

== Natural history ==
The current biological community of Lower St. Regis Lake can be defined as a warm water aquatic ecosystem due to the changes caused by human development. The fish community includes species such as Yellow Perch, Northern Pike, Largemouth bass, Smallmouth bass, Pumpkinseed sunfish, Rock bass, Brown bullhead, and others. Birds and mammals that can be seen at the lake include Common Loons, ducks, Canada geese, River otter, Fisher, and North American beaver. There are no observed aquatic invasive species in the St. Regis waterway system.

== Human history ==
Before any settlements arrived on Lower St. Regis Lake, the lake was used for recreational purposes and as a food source. In 1858 Paul Smith bought land on Lower St Regis Lake. Smith wanted to create a place for families to stay while he took the fathers and husbands out hunting. As a result, the St. Regis House was created. However, this house was not big enough for his guests, so he expanded the house to create the Paul Smith's Hotel. In the year 1907 Paul Smith purchased a dam which was originally used to run a sawmill. He used this dam to raise the level of the lake in order to store water for hydropower. In the 19th century many spruce and white pine around the lake were cut down in order to build three golf courses for the hotel, which affected the water quality of the lake.

The hotel brought many tourists to the area to experience the great Adirondack Park. Wealthy families who came to visit Paul Smith's Hotel then decided to build their own houses and camps on the lake. Due to new settlements the overall development of Lower St. Regis increased five times its previous amount. The lake experienced eutrophication due to families dumping wastewater from bathrooms and kitchens straight into the lake. In the 1970’s there were thick blooms of cyanobacteria in the lake. In the early 20th century, a group of Lower St. Regis Lake property owners including Dr. E.L Trudeau, Phelps Smith, and Dr. Walter B. James started to become concerned within the water quality. As a result, they signed a resolution to ban draining sewage and or wastewater into the lake. In addition, building any structure closer than 30ft from the shore was prohibited.

In 1946, Paul Smith's Hotel made a transition into Paul Smith's College. The college has a sewage treatment plant to prevent waste from contaminating the lake. The Adirondack Watershed Institute with help from Paul Smith’s College have been monitoring Lower St. Regis Lake to maintain healthy water quality levels.

== Recreation ==
Lower St. Regis Lake is a part of the St. Regis Canoe Area which is the only designated canoe area in New York State. The lake is a part of the seven carries which occupies the major water bodies of the St. Regis Canoe Area. The lake has been a popular location for recreation and leisure in the Adirondacks since Paul Smith’s moved to this region in the mid-1800's. Lower St. Regis Lake is mainly used by visitors for fishing, canoeing, and the use of the Adirondack guideboat. Since the 1970's, Lower St. Regis Lake has gone through a large ecological shift in its water quality that has affected the fisheries and the aesthetic of the lake.

Lower St. Regis Lake has a large visitor population, primarily during the summer months. Recreational activities such as boating, paddling, fishing, and camping are the most popular that occur on the lake during peak summer season. Other recreational activities that occur off the water body are hiking, photography, birding, and hunting. During the winter season when the lake is frozen snowmobiling, ice fishing, and cross country skiing are the predominant recreational activities that occur. Visitors to the lake have access to backcountry camping by paddling to other parts of the St. Regis Canoe Area.
