= Upper St. Regis Lake =

Lake in northeastern New York, United States

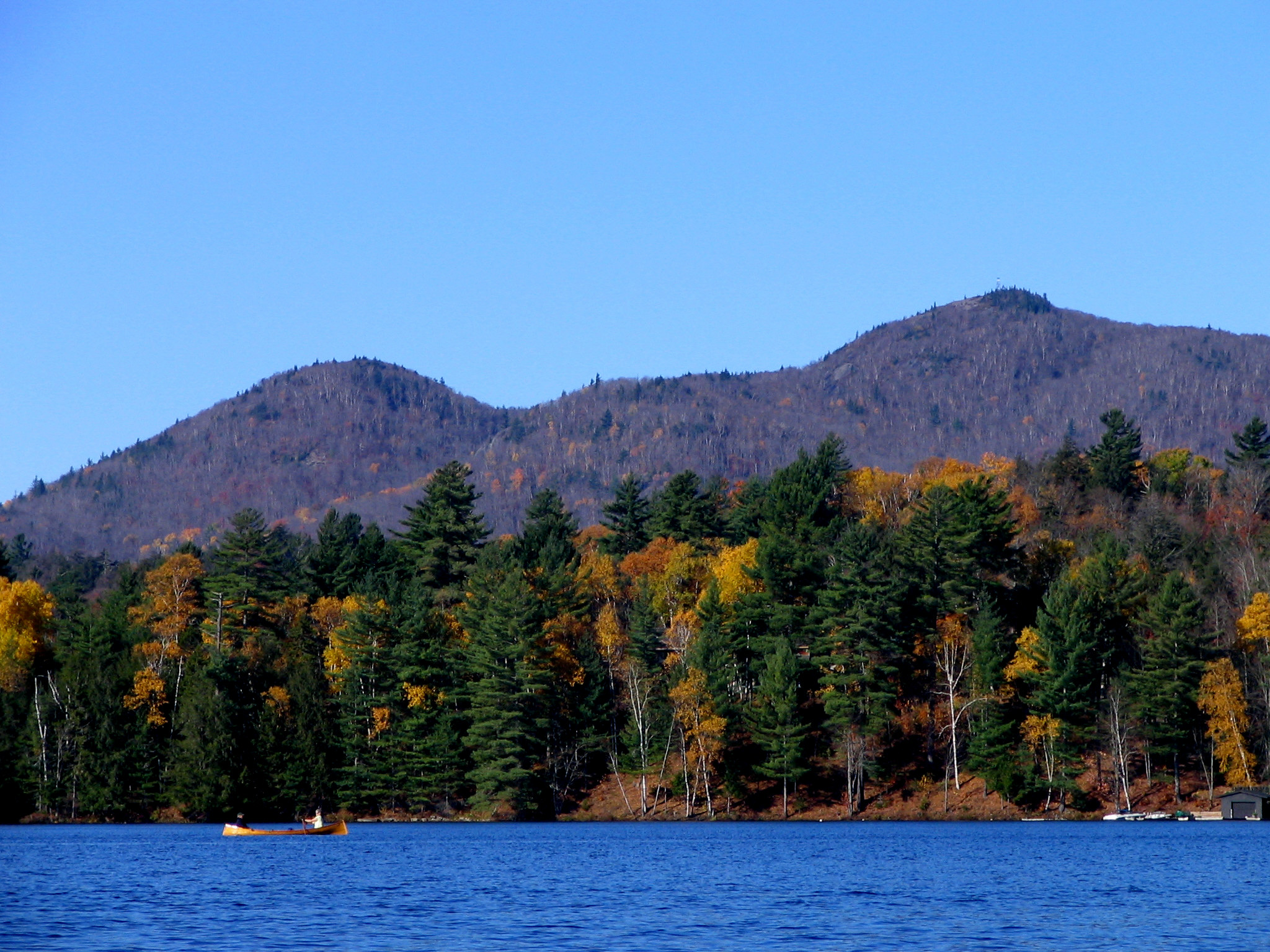
- A guideboat on Upper St. Regis Lake, Saint Regis Mountain behind.

- Location within New York Location within the United States
- Location: Franklin County, New York
- Coordinates: 44°24′18″N 74°16′34″W
- Type: lake
- Surface area: 742-acre (3.00 km^{2})

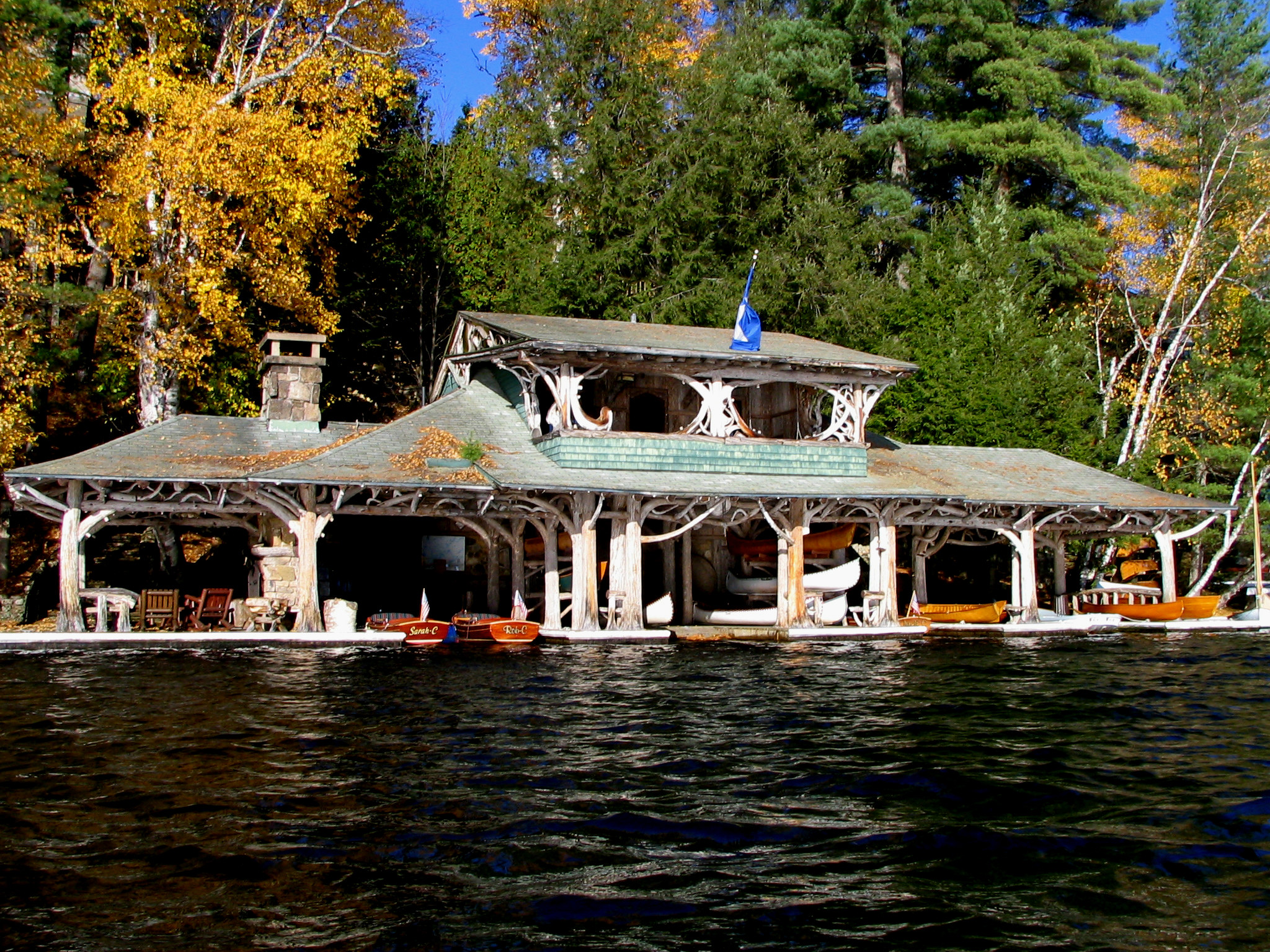
The boathouse at Topridge.

Upper St. Regis Lake is a 742-acre (3.00 km^{2}) lake, part of the St. Regis River in the Adirondacks in northern New York State. Along with Lower St. Regis Lake and Spitfire Lake, it became famous in the late 19th century as a summer playground of America's power elite, drawn to the area by its scenery and Paul Smith's Hotel. It is the site of many old summer "cottages" and Great Camps, including Marjorie Merriweather Post's Topridge. Frederick W. Vanderbilt, Anson Phelps Stokes and Whitelaw Reid were among the summer residents. "The camps of many of these families began as tent colonies, with separate units for sleeping, dining, games, and so on, and evolved into permanent structures built with understated taste."

Apollos "Paul" Smith started his hotel in 1859 as a primitive operation that appealed to sportsmen. Gradually, the hotel became something of a fad amongst the wealthy and powerful of New York. As camping became more of a family activity, Smith would allow families to set up camp for day use along the shores of the St. Regis Lakes, returning to the hotel for the night. Eventually, families would lease or buy land from Smith and build tent platforms, and finally clusters of cabins and cottages.

Even in the early stages, some of these camps became quite elaborate. In 1883, one of the first families, the Stokes, would arrive in a "special parlour horse car direct from 42nd street to Ausable for $100." The party consisted of ten family members and an equal number of servants, "three horses, two dogs, one carriage, five large boxes of tents, three cases of wine, two packages of stovepipe, two stoves, one bale of china, one iron pot, four washstands, one barrel of hardware, four bundles of poles, seventeen cots and seventeen mattresses, four canvas packages, one buckboard, [...], twenty-five trunks, thirteen small boxes, one boat, one hamper", all of which was then transferred to wagons for the 36-mile (58 km) ride to Paul Smiths, and thence by boat to their island campsite.

Upper Saint Regis Lake is part of the original Seven Carries canoe route from Paul Smith's Hotel to Saranac Inn. It is also the original home of the Idem-class racing sailboats, originally built in 1900, the oldest class of actively racing one-design boats with original boats participating.

The lake is located in the towns of Harrietstown and Brighton, both in Franklin County, New York.

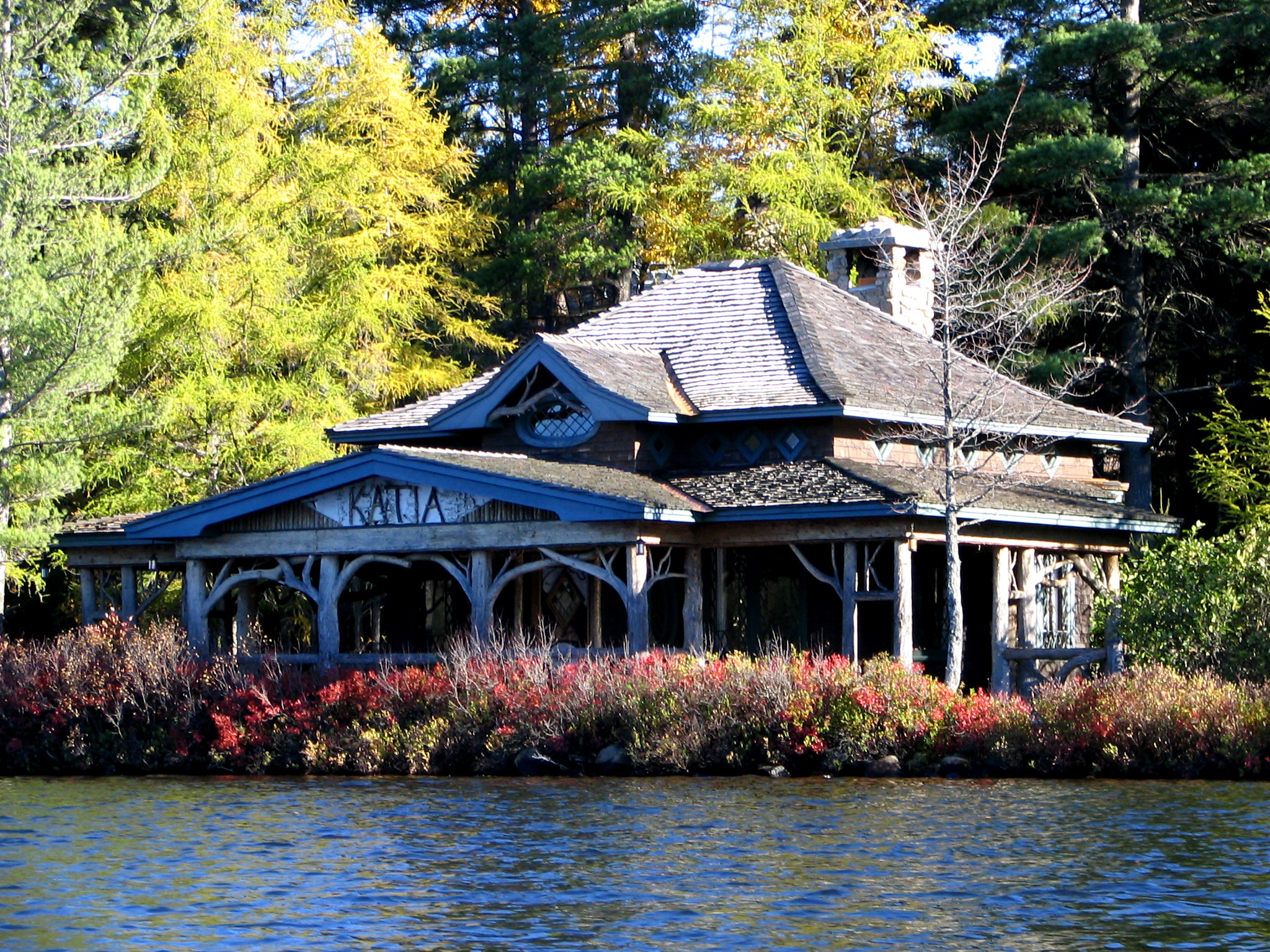
Camp Katia

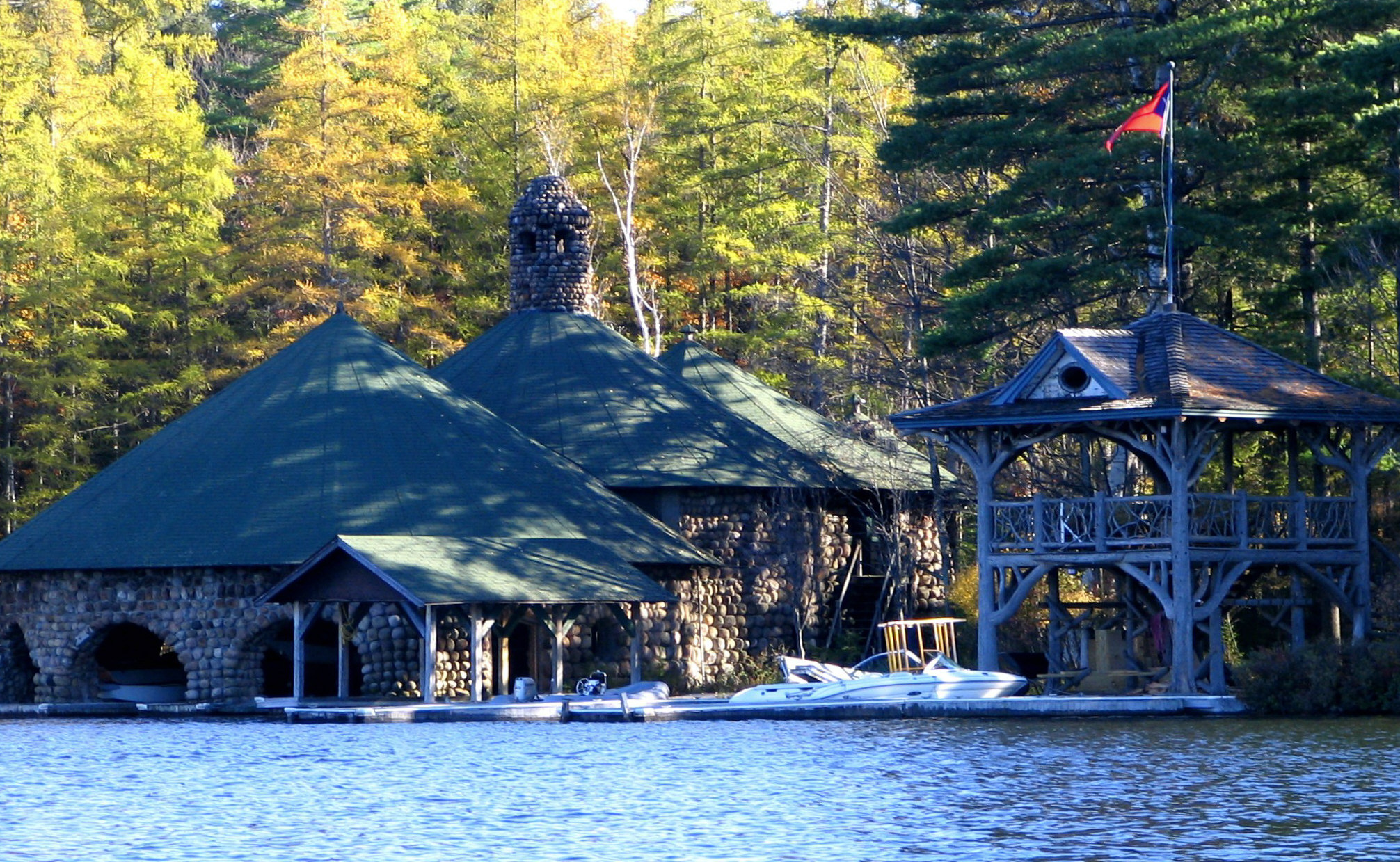
The boathouse at Camp Katia.

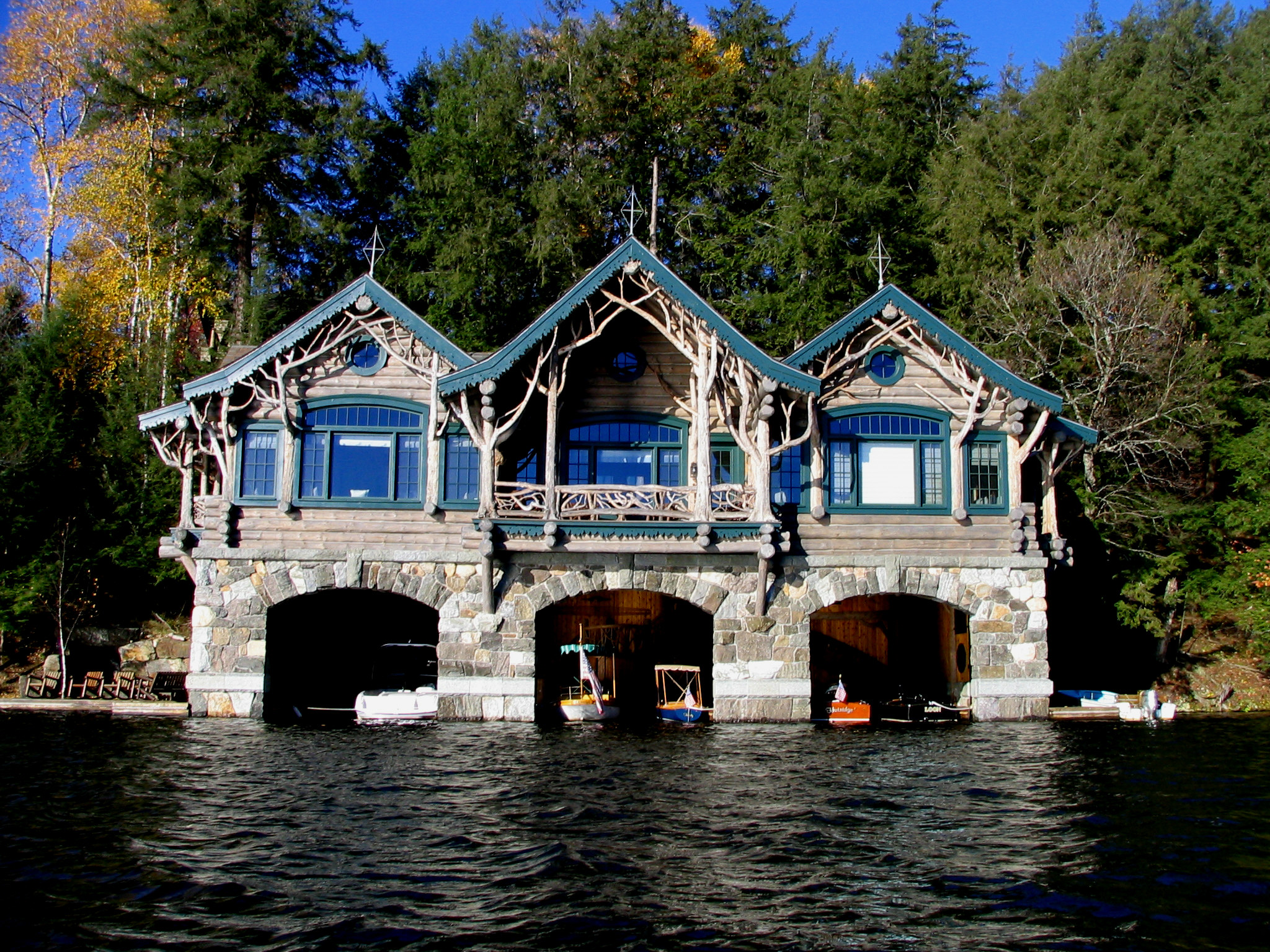
Another boathouse at Topridge.

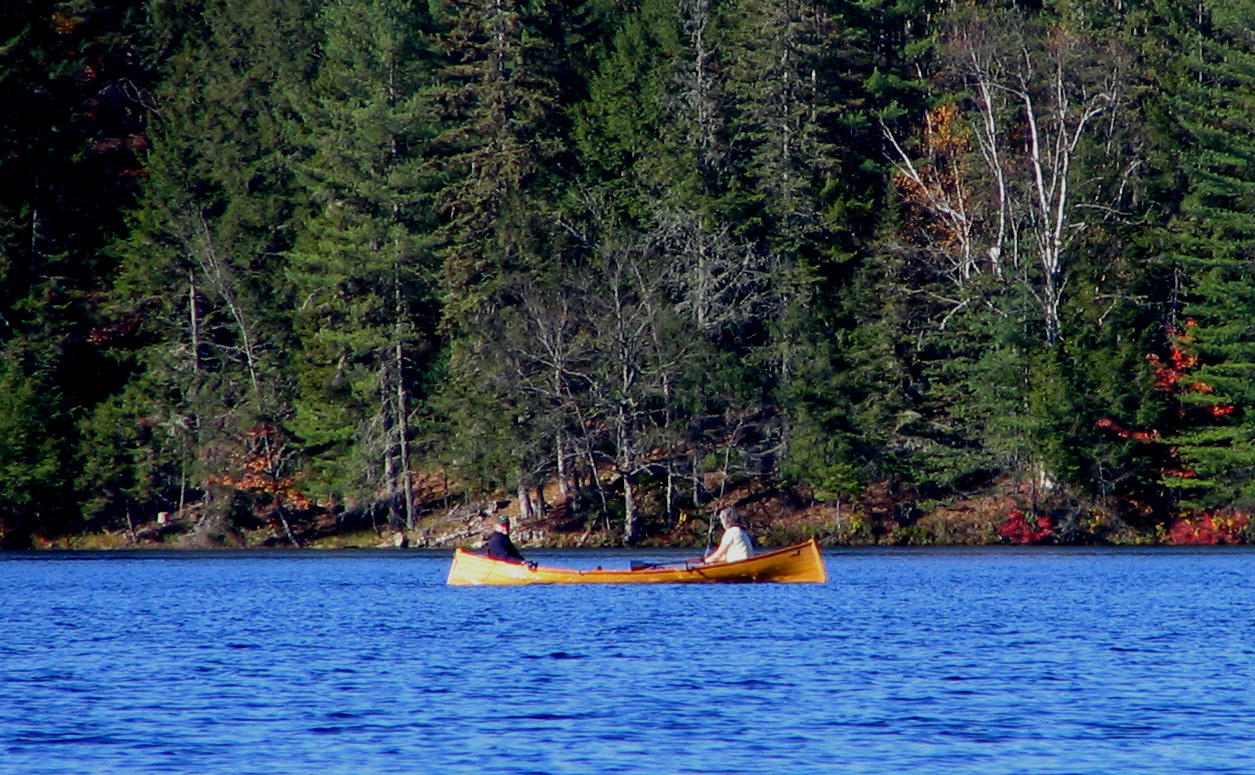
An Adirondack guideboat.

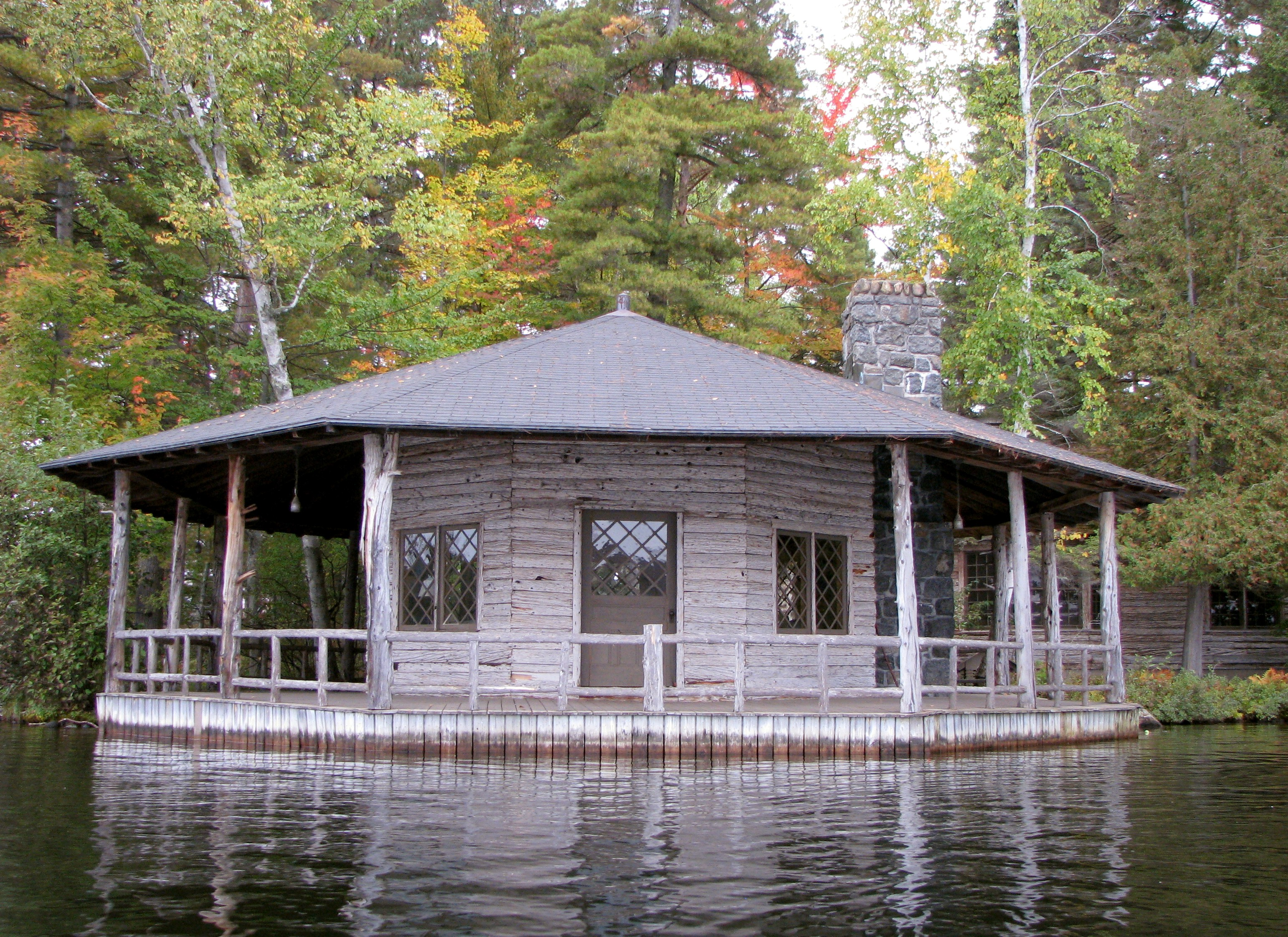
Billiard Room, Camp Wild Air

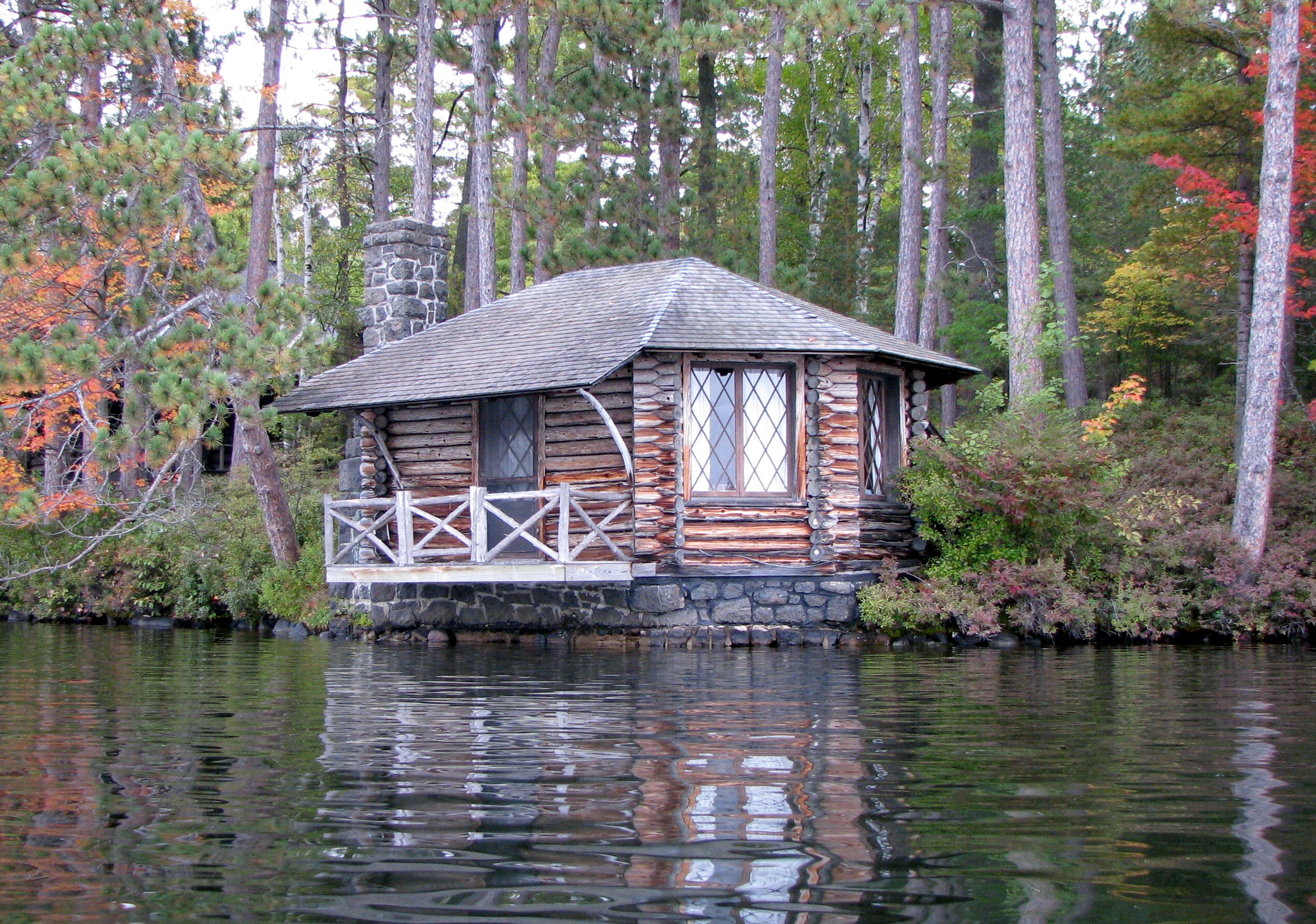
Bishops Palace, Camp Wild Air

== Sources ==
- Donaldson, Alfred L., A History of the Adirondacks. New York: Century, 1921. ISBN 0-916346-26-9. (reprint)
- Jerome, Christine, Adirondack Passage: Cruise of Canoe Sairy Gamp, HarperCollins, 1994. ISBN 0-935272-94-1.
- Hooker, Mildred Phelps Stokes, Camp Chronicles, Blue Mountain Lake, NY: Adirondack Museum, 1964. ISBN 0-910020-16-7.
