= Saint Regis Mountain =

Mountain in New York State, U.S.

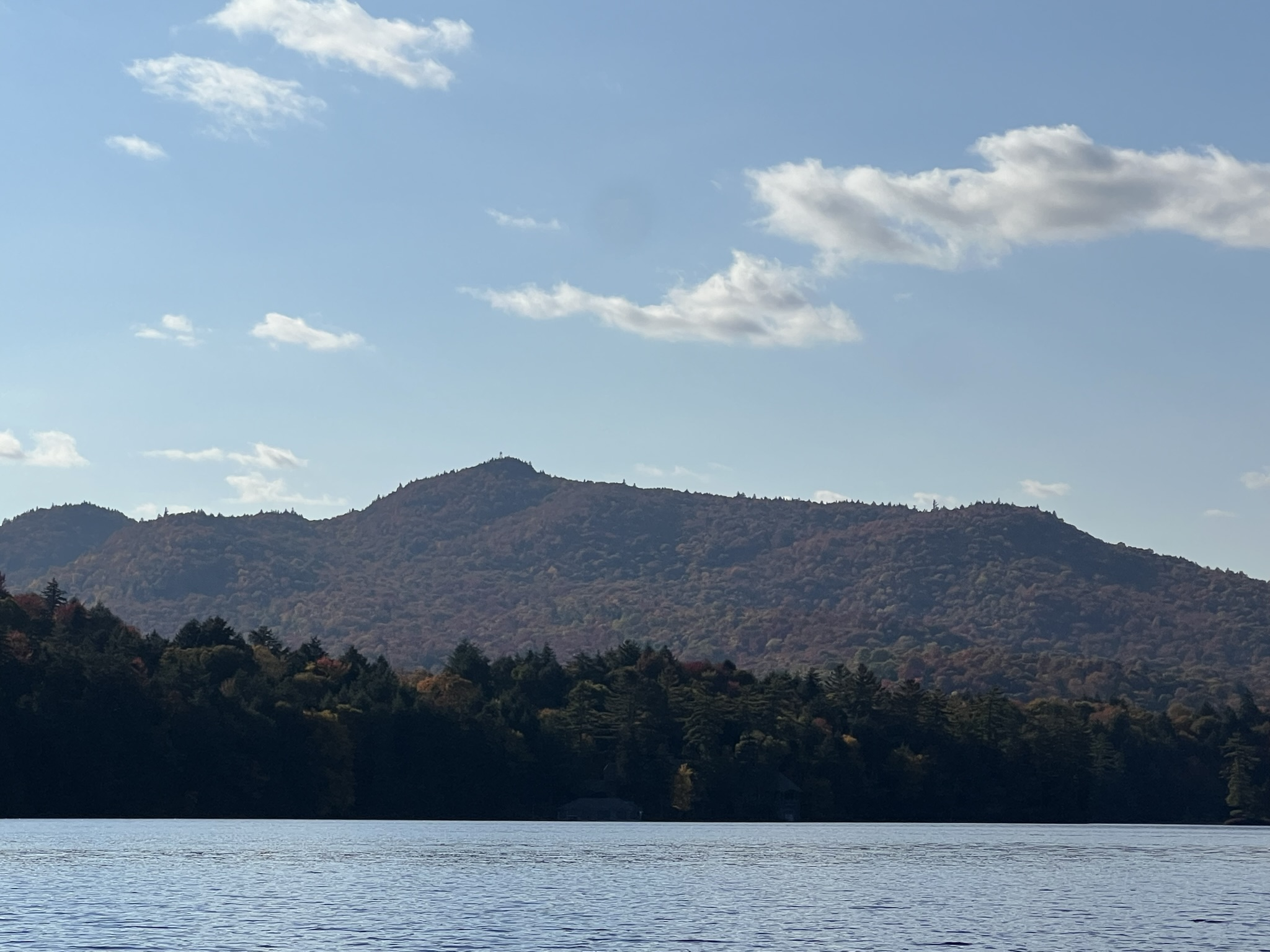
- Saint Regis Mountain from Upper St. Regis Lake

Highest point
- Elevation: 2,838 ft (865 m)
- Coordinates: 44°24′30″N 74°19′47″W

Geography
- Location within New York Adirondack Park Location within the United States
- Location: Franklin County, New York
- Topo map: USGS Saint Regis Mountain

Saint Regis Mountain is a 2,838-foot-tall (865 m) mountain in the town of Santa Clara, New York, in Franklin County at the center of the Saint Regis Canoe Area in the Adirondack Park.

It can be climbed from a trailhead on Keese Mills Road in Keese Mill, west of Paul Smiths. The trail is a gradual 3.3 mile ascent with a gain of 1168 feet.

The view from the summit includes thirty lakes, including the Upper and Lower Saranac Lake, and Upper and Lower Saint Regis Lake. The Adirondack High Peaks can also be seen.

The summit is bare rock, having been cleared by a fire started accidentally by a surveying party led by Verplanck Colvin in 1876. The St. Regis Mountain Fire Observation Station is at the summit was restored in 2016 and is now open to the public.

== Gallery ==
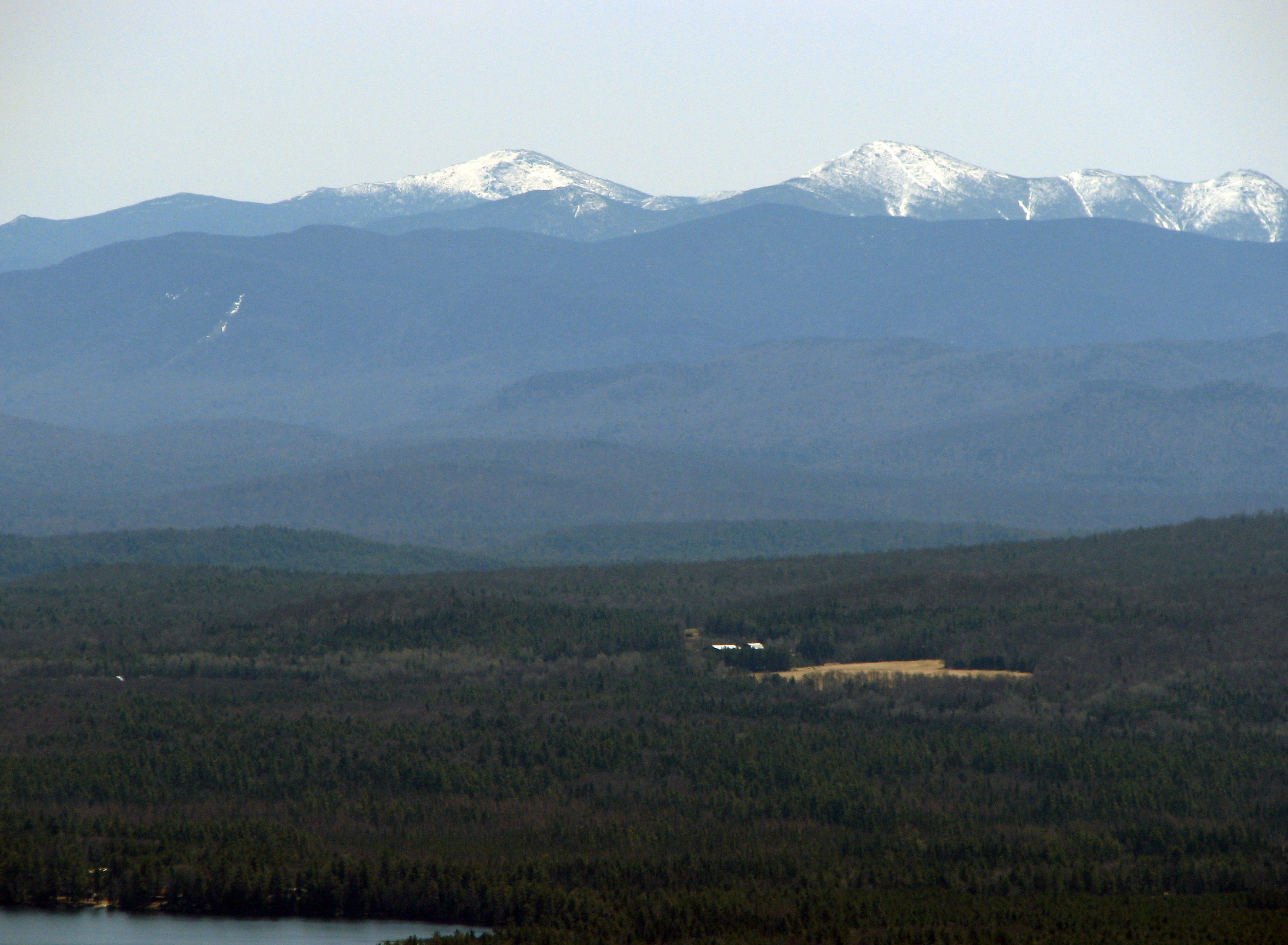
The Adirondack High Peaks from St. Regis Mountain. Mount Marcy is just left of center, Algonquin Peak is to the right

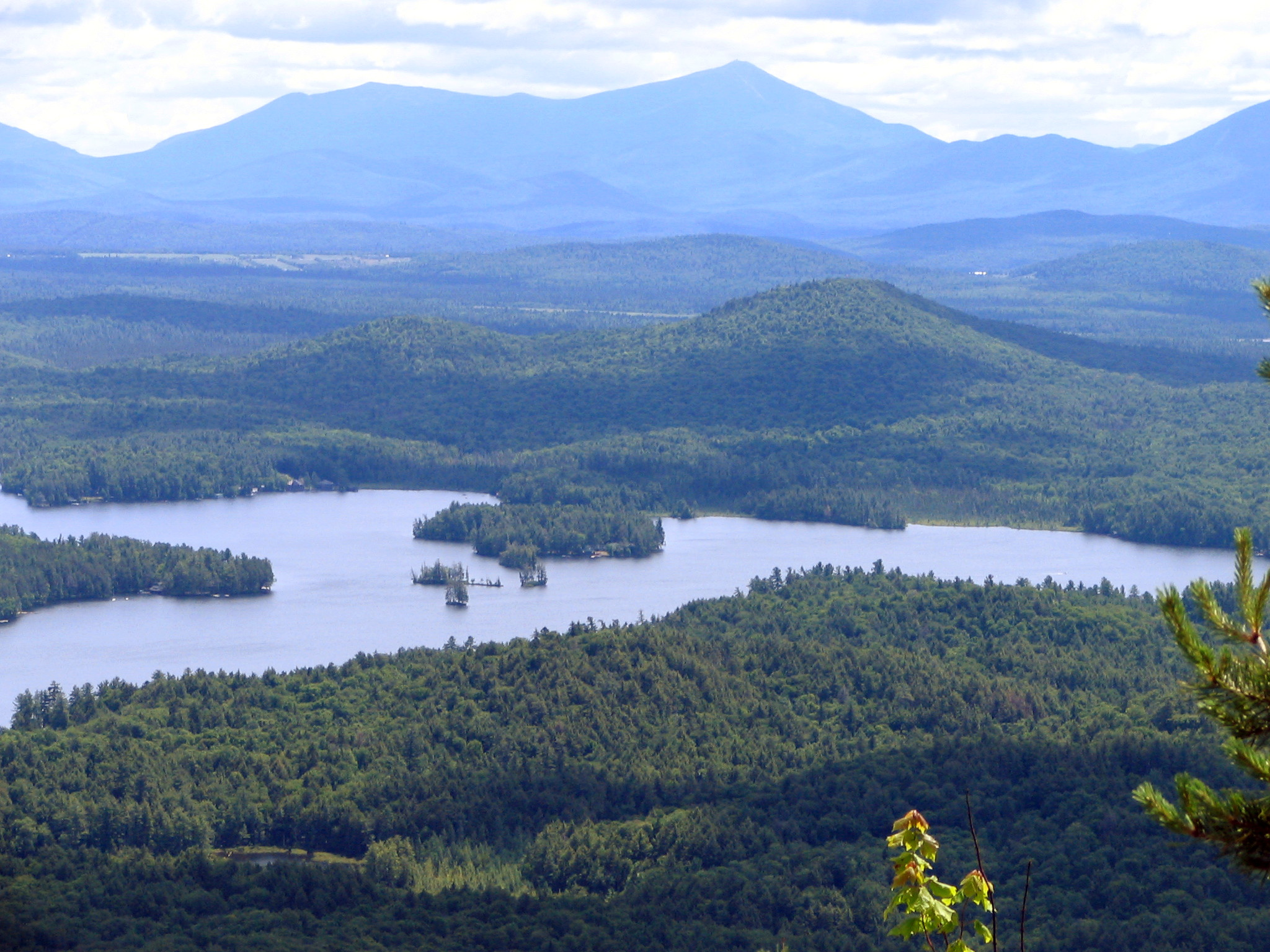
View from St. Regis Mountain
