= Paul Smiths, New York =

- Census-designated place
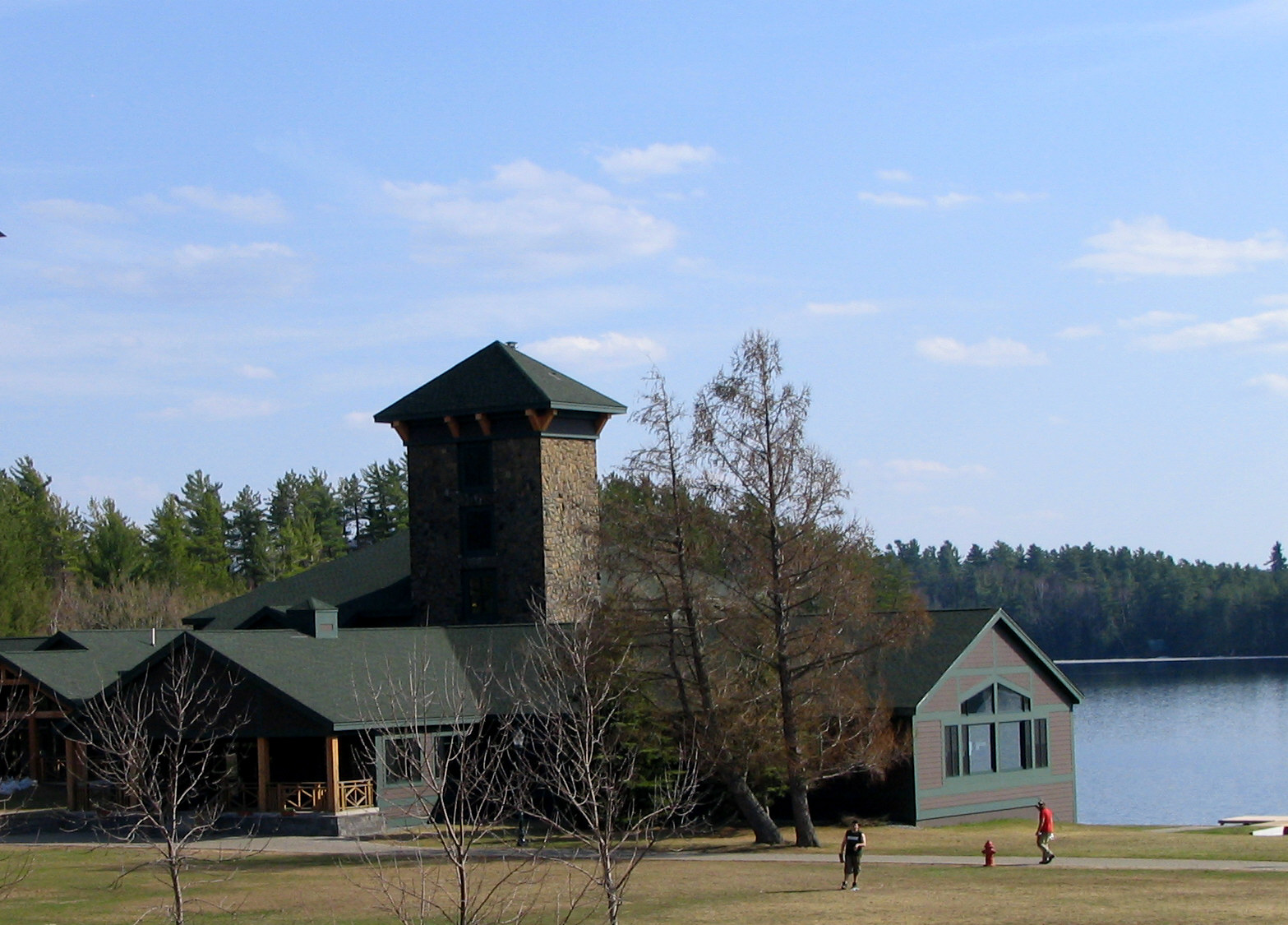
- Paul Smiths College student center

- Location within the state of New York
- Coordinates: 44°26′10″N 74°15′7″W
- Country: United States
- State: New York
- County: Franklin
- Town: Brighton

Government
  - Mayor: Will Chance

Area
  - Total: 0.39 sq mi (1.02 km^{2})
  - Land: 0.26 sq mi (0.67 km^{2})
  - Water: 0.14 sq mi (0.35 km^{2})
- Elevation: 1,600 ft (500 m)

Population (2020)
  - Total: 411
  - Density: 1,596.5/sq mi (616.41/km^{2})
- Time zone: UTC-5 (Eastern (EST))
  - Summer (DST): UTC-4 (EDT)
- ZIP code: 12970
- Area code: 518
- FIPS code: 36-56770
- GNIS feature ID: 970460

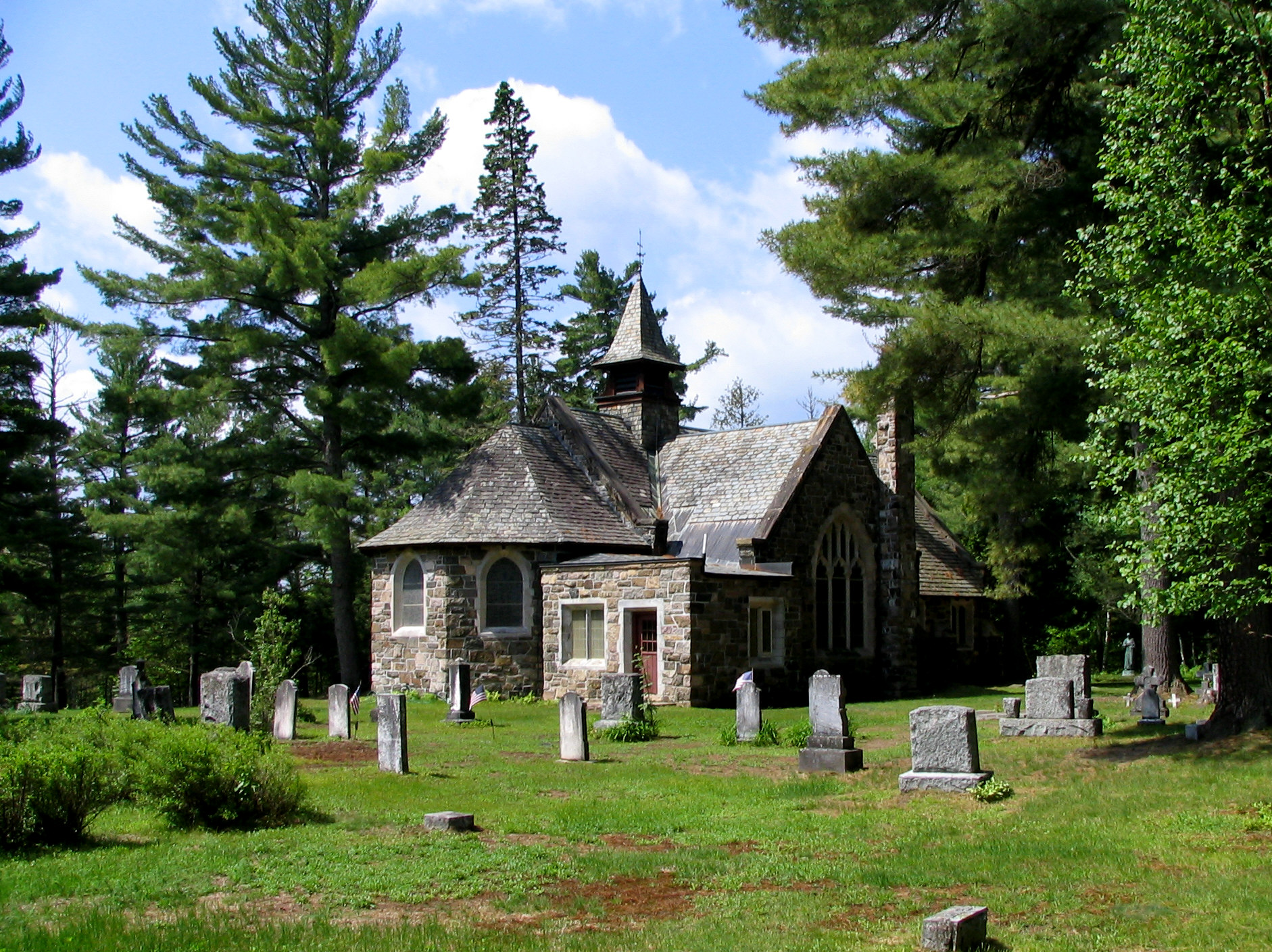
St. Johns in the Wilderness

Paul Smiths is a hamlet and census-designated place (CDP) in the town of Brighton in Franklin County, New York, United States. It is located on Lower Saint Regis Lake in the Adirondacks, 12 miles (19 km) northwest of Saranac Lake, located at 44°26' North 74°15' West. As of the 2020 census, Paul Smiths had a population of 411.

== History ==
The hamlet was named after the Paul Smith's Hotel (formally known as the Saint Regis House), founded in 1859 by Apollos "Paul" Smith as one of the first wilderness resorts in the Adirondacks. Paul Smith's College was built on the site of the hotel after the hotel burned down in 1930. It was funded by the estate of Smith's son Phelps, who died in 1937. It is the locale of Osgood Pond, home of historic Northbrook Lodge, listed on the National Register of Historic Places in 2014, and of White Pine Camp, the Summer Whitehouse of President Calvin Coolidge.

== Geography ==
Paul Smiths is located in the southern part of the town of Brighton, between Lower St. Regis Lake to the south and Osgood Pond to the north. It is in southern Franklin County. The CDP limits correspond to the campus of Paul Smith's College.

New York State Route 30 passes Paul Smiths, leading north 32 miles (51 km) to Malone, the Franklin County seat, and south 26 miles (42 km) to Tupper Lake. New York State Route 86 begins at Paul Smiths and leads 12 miles (19 km) southeast to Saranac Lake village.

According to the U.S. Census Bureau, the Paul Smiths CDP has a total area of 0.39 square miles (1.01 km^{2}), of which 0.25 square miles (0.66 km^{2}) is land and 0.14 square miles (0.35 km^{2}), or 34.63%, is water, consisting of part of Lower St. Regis Lake.

== Demographics ==
Historical population
Census	Pop.	Note	%±
2020	411		—
U.S. Decennial Census

== Climate ==
The Köppen Climate Classification sub-type for this climate is "Dfb" (Warm Summer Continental Climate). Paul Smiths has a record high of 100, set in July 1936 and a record low of -48, set in January 1912, tying the state record low for January.

Climate data for Paul Smiths
Month	Jan	Feb	Mar	Apr	May	Jun	Jul	Aug	Sep	Oct	Nov	Dec	Year
Mean daily maximum °C (°F)	−2 (28)	−1 (31)	3 (37)	12 (53)	19 (66)	24 (75)	26 (79)	24 (76)	20 (68)	14 (58)	7 (44)	−1 (31)	12 (54)
Mean daily minimum °C (°F)	−14 (6)	−14 (7)	−9 (15)	−2 (29)	4 (39)	9 (49)	11 (52)	10 (50)	7 (44)	1 (34)	−3 (26)	−11 (12)	−1 (30)
Average precipitation mm (inches)	58 (2.3)	64 (2.5)	66 (2.6)	69 (2.7)	79 (3.1)	86 (3.4)	91 (3.6)	100 (4)	79 (3.1)	74 (2.9)	81 (3.2)	84 (3.3)	930 (36.7)
Source: Weatherbase

== Education ==
The school district is Saranac Lake Central School District.
