= New York State Route 186 =

State highway in Franklin County, New York, US

New York State Route 186
- Map of the Saranac Lake area with NY 186 highlighted in red

Route information
- Maintained by NYSDOT
- Length: 3.88 mi (6.24 km)
- Existed: March 28, 1989–present

Major junctions
- West end: NY 30 in Harrietstown
- East end: NY 86 in Harrietstown

Location
- Country: United States
- State: New York
- Counties: Franklin

Highway system
- New York Highways; Interstate; US; State; Reference; Parkways
← NY 185	→ NY 187

New York State Route 186 (NY 186) is a short east–west state highway in northern New York in the United States. The highway is located entirely within the town of Harrietstown in the southwest part of Franklin County. The western terminus is at NY 30 and the eastern terminus is at NY 86. NY 186 lies south of, and serves, the Adirondack Regional Airport. The current alignment of NY 186 was designated in 1989 to follow a former routing of NY 86.

== Route description ==
In the west, NY 186 begins at NY 30 in Harrietstown, near the eastern bank of Lake Clear. Known as Lake Clear Road, NY 186 heads east-northeastward, crossing a pair of train tracks and later a creek. Situated within the forested terrain of the Adirondack State Park, the highway passes to the south of, and serves, the Adirondack Regional Airport. South of the airport NY 186 intersects several local roads. The highway turns more towards the northeast upon passing the airport, and proceeds uneventfully. Subsequent to turning towards the east, NY 186 terminates at NY 86, still within Harrietstown.

== History ==
The modern routing of NY 186 was originally designated as part of NY 10 when the first set of posted routes in New York were assigned in 1924. In the 1930 renumbering, NY 10 was rerouted east of Lake Clear to follow modern NY 30 north to the Canadian border. The former routing of NY 10 between Lake Clear and Harrietstown was incorporated into NY 86, a new route extending from Lake Clear to Jay. NY 86 remained on this alignment until March 28, 1989, when the NY 192 designation was deleted. NY 86 was then rerouted to follow the former routing of NY 192 northwestward to Paul Smiths. The Lake Clear–Harrietstown roadway, vacated by NY 86, was redesignated as NY 186.

== Major intersections ==
The entire route is in Harrietstown, Franklin County.

mi	km	Destinations	Notes
0.00	0.00	NY 30	Western terminus; hamlet of Lake Clear
3.88	6.24	NY 86	Eastern terminus
1.000 mi = 1.609 km; 1.000 km = 0.621 mi
