= New York State Route 86 =

Highway in New York

New York State Route 86
- Map of northeastern New York with NY 86 highlighted in red

Route information
- Maintained by NYSDOT
- Length: 39.11 mi (62.94 km)
- Existed: 1930–present

Major junctions
- West end: NY 30 in Brighton
- NY 3 in Saranac Lake; NY 73 in Lake Placid
- East end: NY 9N in Jay

Location
- Country: United States
- State: New York
- Counties: Franklin, Essex

Highway system
- New York Highways; Interstate; US; State; Reference; Parkways
← I-86	→ NY 86A
← NY 192	NY 192A	→ NY 193

New York State Route 86 (NY 86) is a 39.11-mile (62.94 km) long state highway located within Adirondack Park in northern New York, in the United States, linking Franklin County to Essex County. The western terminus of the route is at NY 30 in the hamlet of Paul Smiths. The eastern terminus is at NY 9N in Jay. Although largely a two-lane road, NY 86 is one of only two east–west highways in the High Peaks area of the Adirondack Park (the other being NY 73), providing a major link between hamlets and tourist destinations.

NY 86 was established in the 1930 renumbering of state highways in New York, largely replacing a realigned NY 3. North of Saranac Lake, NY 86 initially followed modern NY 186 before being rerouted onto its modern alignment. The portion of NY 86 north of Harrietstown was once NY 192.

== Route description ==
NY 86 begins at NY 30 in Paul Smiths, Franklin County. The route heads east through the town of Brighton, providing mountain views of Adirondack Park. After passing through the tiny communities of Easy Street and Gabriels and traversing the southern edge of Paul Smiths College, NY 86 turns south to serve Harrietstown, where it meets NY 186 at the hamlet of the same name. NY 86 continues southward to Saranac Lake, the largest community on NY 86 in Franklin County. Moving through Saranac Lake, the business and tourism anchor for the area, NY 86 is well marked, but follows local roads to an intersection with NY 3 in the village center. The routes briefly overlap before splitting at the northern edge of Lake Flower.

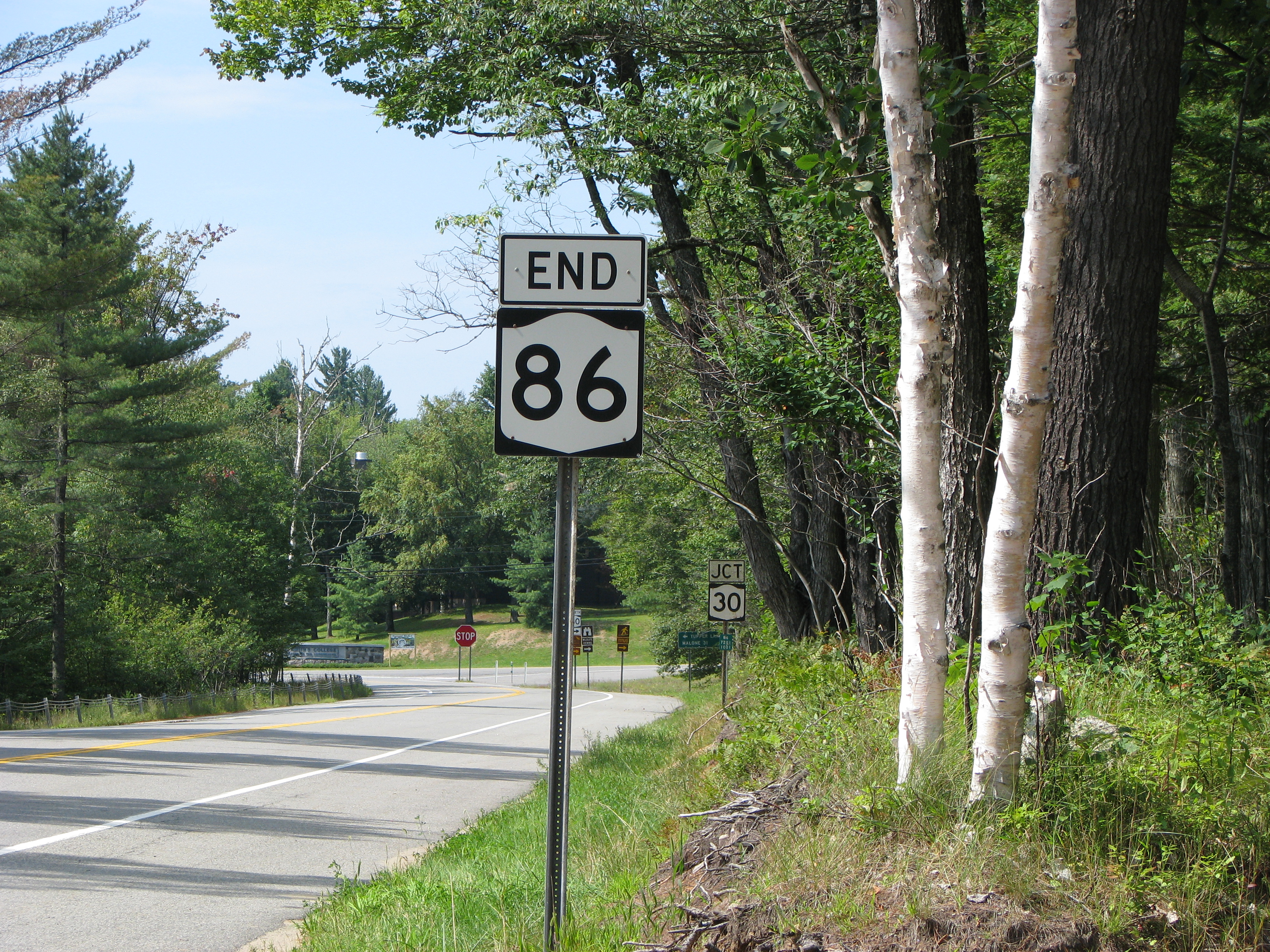
Western terminus of NY 86. The entrance to Paul Smiths College is directly across NY 30

East of NY 3, NY 86 becomes the primary lakeside roadway as it follows the northern and eastern extents of Lake Flower into Essex County. Roughly 0.75 miles (1.21 km) into the county, NY 86 leaves the lakeshore and turns northeastward toward the small hamlet of Ray Brook. Farther east, the highway travels through the Clifford R. Pettis Memorial Forest before arriving in the village of Lake Placid as Saranac Avenue.

NY 86 proceeds eastward through the village, coming within view of Lake Placid before turning south onto Main Street at the western shore of Mirror Lake. As Main, NY 86 runs through the village and along Mirror Lake as the major tourist thoroughfare, passing numerous businesses and the sites of the 1932 and 1980 Winter Olympics. At the southern edge of the village, Route 86 intersects the western terminus of NY 73.

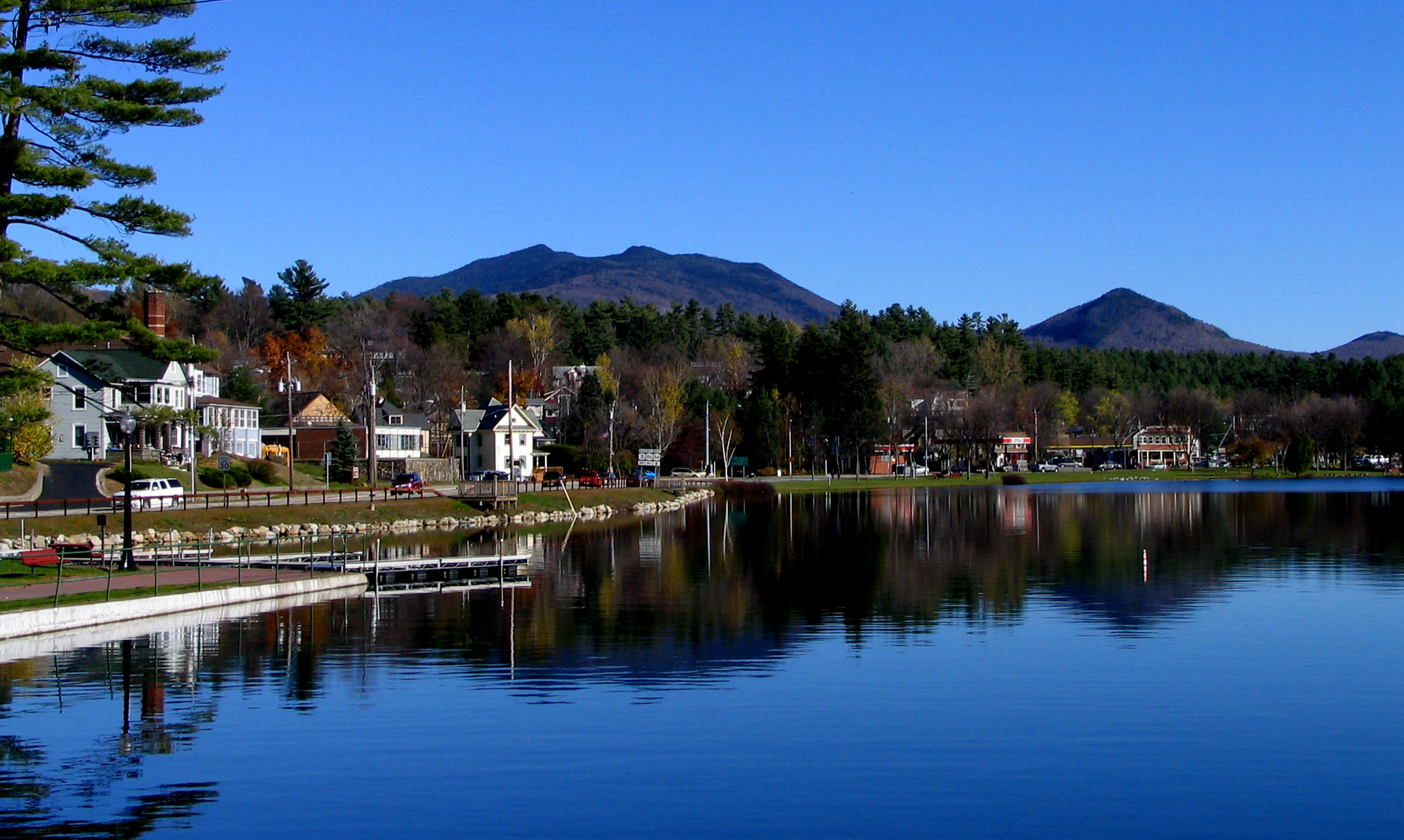
Lake Flower in Saranac Lake, with NY 3 and NY 86 routed along the lakeshore

Outside of Lake Placid, NY 86 enters the town of Wilmington, home of the Olympic Ski Center at Whiteface Mountain. Through Wilmington, the road largely follows the Ausable River northeastward, providing scenic views as it heads through "Wilmington Notch," noted for trout fishing. At an intersection with the eastern terminus of NY 431 in the hamlet of Wilmington, NY 86 turns eastward and crosses into the town of Jay, where it terminates at NY 9N at the town's village green.

Route 86 runs adjacent to the west branch of the Ausable River through a stretch that Trout Unlimited's Guide to America's 100 Best Trout Streams describes as one of the finest river fishing spots in the United States.

== History ==
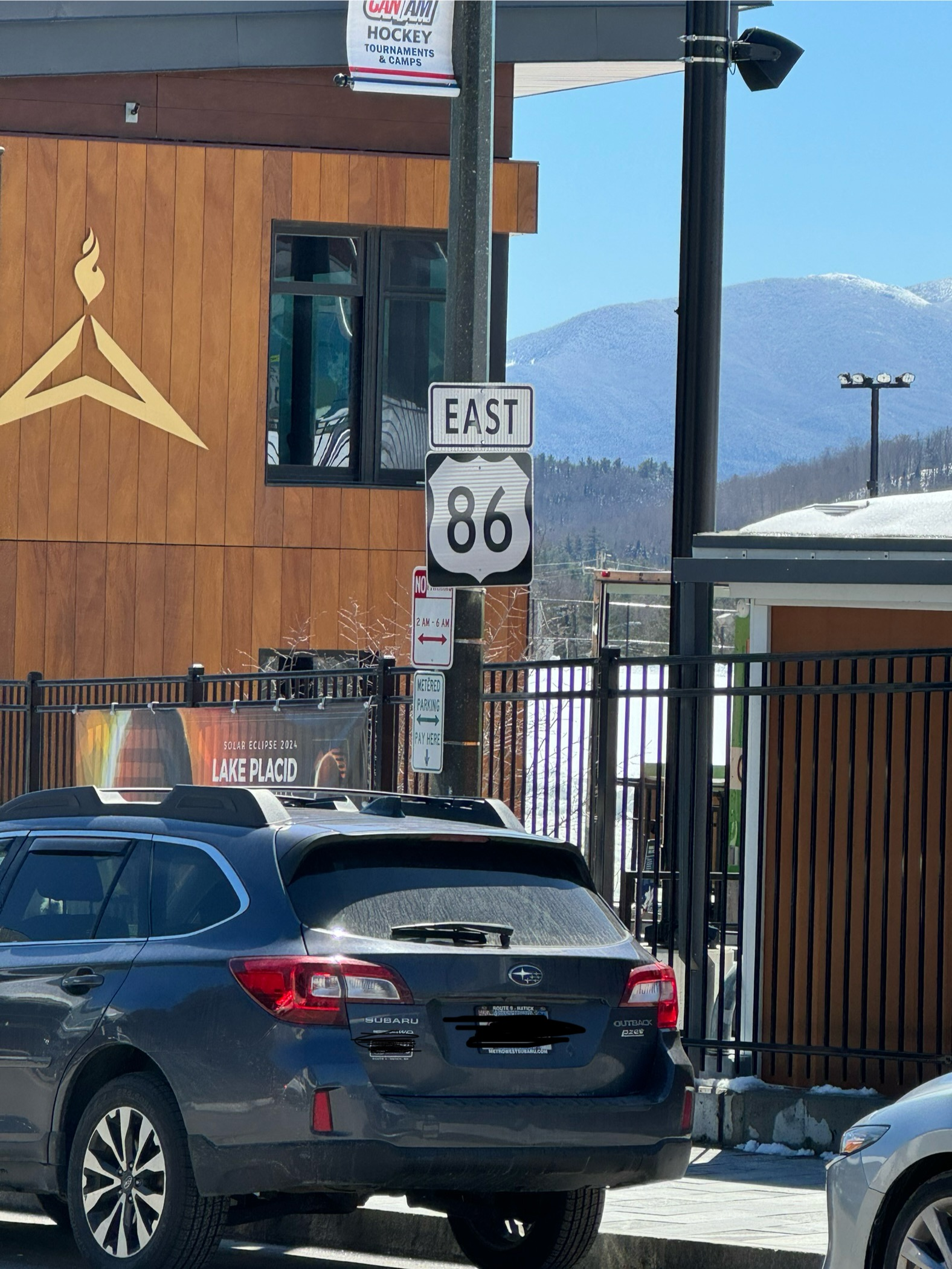
Reassurance sign of NY 86 East with a U.S. Route shield instead of state Route shield in Lake Placid

What is now NY 86 from Paul Smiths to Jay via Saranac Lake and Lake Placid was originally part of the Theodore Roosevelt International Highway, an auto trail extending across the North American continent from the Pacific Ocean to the Atlantic Ocean. When the first set of posted routes in New York were assigned in 1924, NY 3 was assigned to the entirety of the highway within New York.

NY 3 remained in place up to the 1930 renumbering of state highways in New York when it was rerouted onto its modern alignment through the North Country. The portion of former NY 3 from Harrietstown to Jay, as well as a section of former NY 10 (modern NY 186) from Harrietstown to Lake Clear, was redesignated as NY 86. North of Harrietstown, the former alignment of NY 3 became NY 408 from Harrietstown to Gabriels and the western half of NY 192 from Gabriels to Paul Smiths. NY 408 was co-designated as part of NY 365 c. 1932, and ultimately supplanted by NY 365 c. 1938. NY 365 was rerouted in the mid-1940s, leaving the Harrietstown–Gabriels roadway unnumbered.

In the early 1950s, NY 365's old routing between Harrietstown and Gabriels was designated as NY 192A, a spur route of NY 192. NY 192A was removed from the state highway system on January 7, 1980, when NY 192 was rerouted east of Gabriels to follow NY 192A. On March 28, 1989, NY 192 was eliminated in much the same way as its spur route as NY 86 was rerouted to follow NY 192 through Gabriels to Paul Smiths. NY 86's former routing past the Adirondack Regional Airport became NY 186.

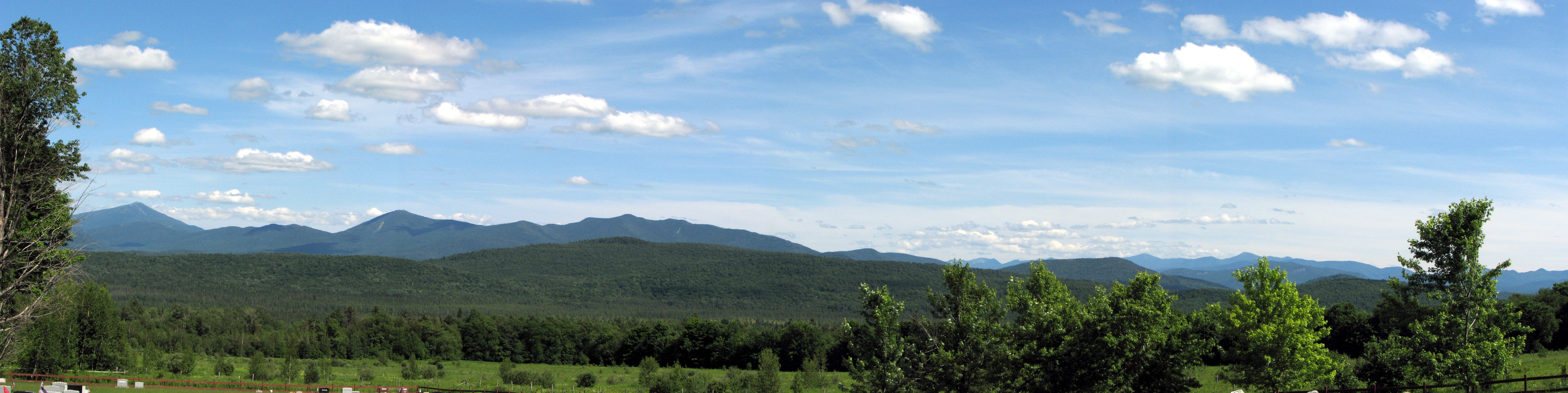
View of the Adirondack High Peaks from NY 86 near the hamlet of Harrietstown

== Major intersections ==
County	Location	mi	km	Destinations	Notes
Franklin	Brighton	0.00	0.00	NY 30 – Malone, Tupper Lake	Western terminus; Hamlet of Paul Smiths
Franklin	Harrietstown	7.35	11.83	NY 186 west – Lake Clear	Eastern terminus of NY 186
Franklin	Saranac Lake	11.94	19.22	NY 3 east – Plattsburgh	Northern terminus of NY 3 / NY 86 overlap
Franklin	Saranac Lake	12.37	19.91	NY 3 west – Tupper Lake	Southern terminus of NY 3 / NY 86 overlap
Essex	Lake Placid	21.98	35.37	NY 73 east – Keene	Western terminus of NY 73
Essex	Town of Wilmington	34.08	54.85	NY 431 west – Whiteface Mountain	Eastern terminus of NY 431; hamlet of Wilmington
Essex	Jay	39.11	62.94	NY 9N to I-87 – Au Sable Forks, Upper Jay	Eastern terminus
1.000 mi = 1.609 km; 1.000 km = 0.621 mi: Concurrency terminus

== NY 86A ==
New York State Route 86A
- Location: Lake Placid–Keene
- Existed: 1930–mid-1950s

NY 86A was a spur route connecting NY 86 in Lake Placid to NY 9N in Keene. It was assigned as part of the 1930 renumbering of state highways in New York and replaced by an extended NY 73 in the mid-1950s.
