= CommuteAir =

Regional airline of the United States

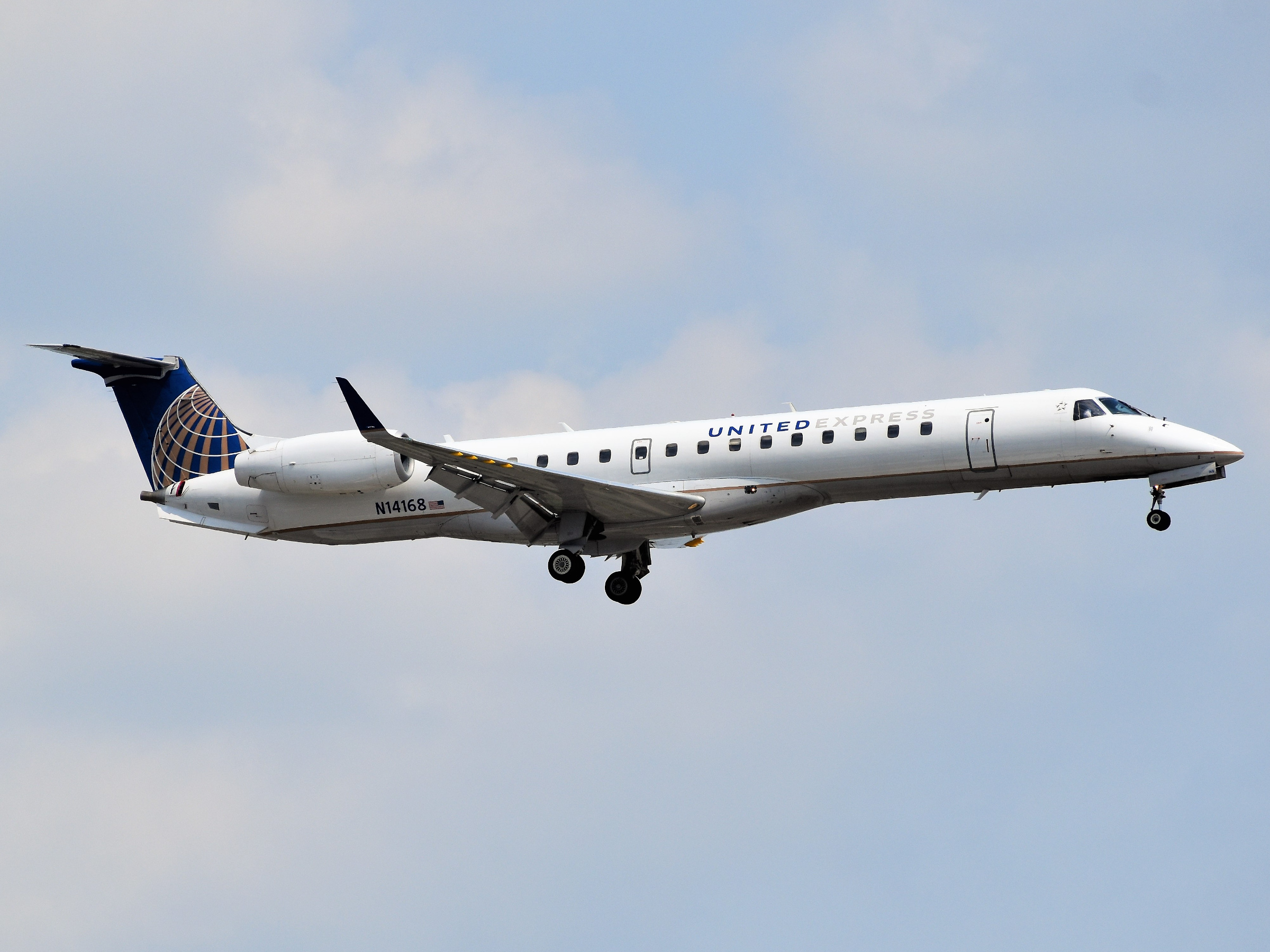
IATA	ICAO	Call sign
C5	UCA	COMMUTEAIR
- Founded: 1989; 37 years ago
- Commenced operations: August 1, 1989; 37 years ago
- AOC #: JJBA987B
- Hubs: Houston–Intercontinental; Washington–Dulles
- Frequent-flyer program: MileagePlus
- Alliance: Star Alliance (affiliate)
- Fleet size: 75
- Destinations: 75+
- Headquarters: North Olmsted, Ohio
- Key people: John Sullivan (executive chairman); Rick Hoefling (president & CEO)
- Employees: 1,235 (2024)
- Website: www.commuteair.com

CommuteAir is a regional airline of the United States founded in 1989. Today, CommuteAir operates more than 1,600 weekly flights, exclusively on behalf of United Express, serving over 75 U.S. destinations and 3 in Mexico. CommuteAir's fleet of Embraer ERJ 145 aircraft fly from its bases at Washington–Dulles and Houston–Intercontinental. The company was previously called CommutAir until July 26, 2022, when it legally changed its name to the present-day CommuteAir. The company also operates charter services under its own brand using Embraer E170 and ERJ-145XR aircraft.

== History ==
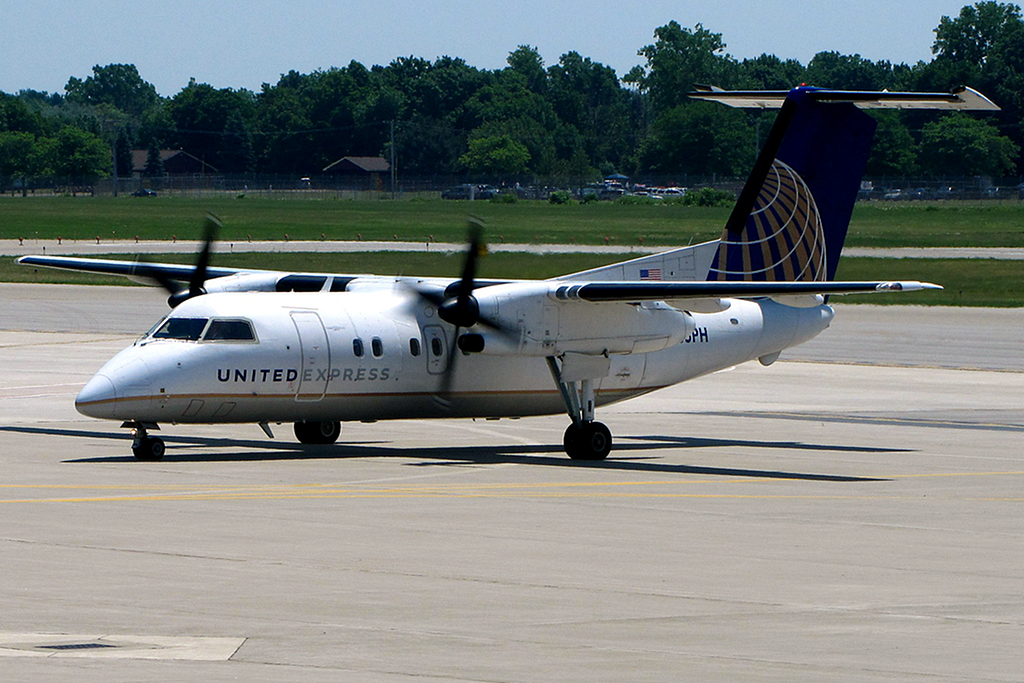
United Express Bombardier Q200 formerly operated by CommutAir

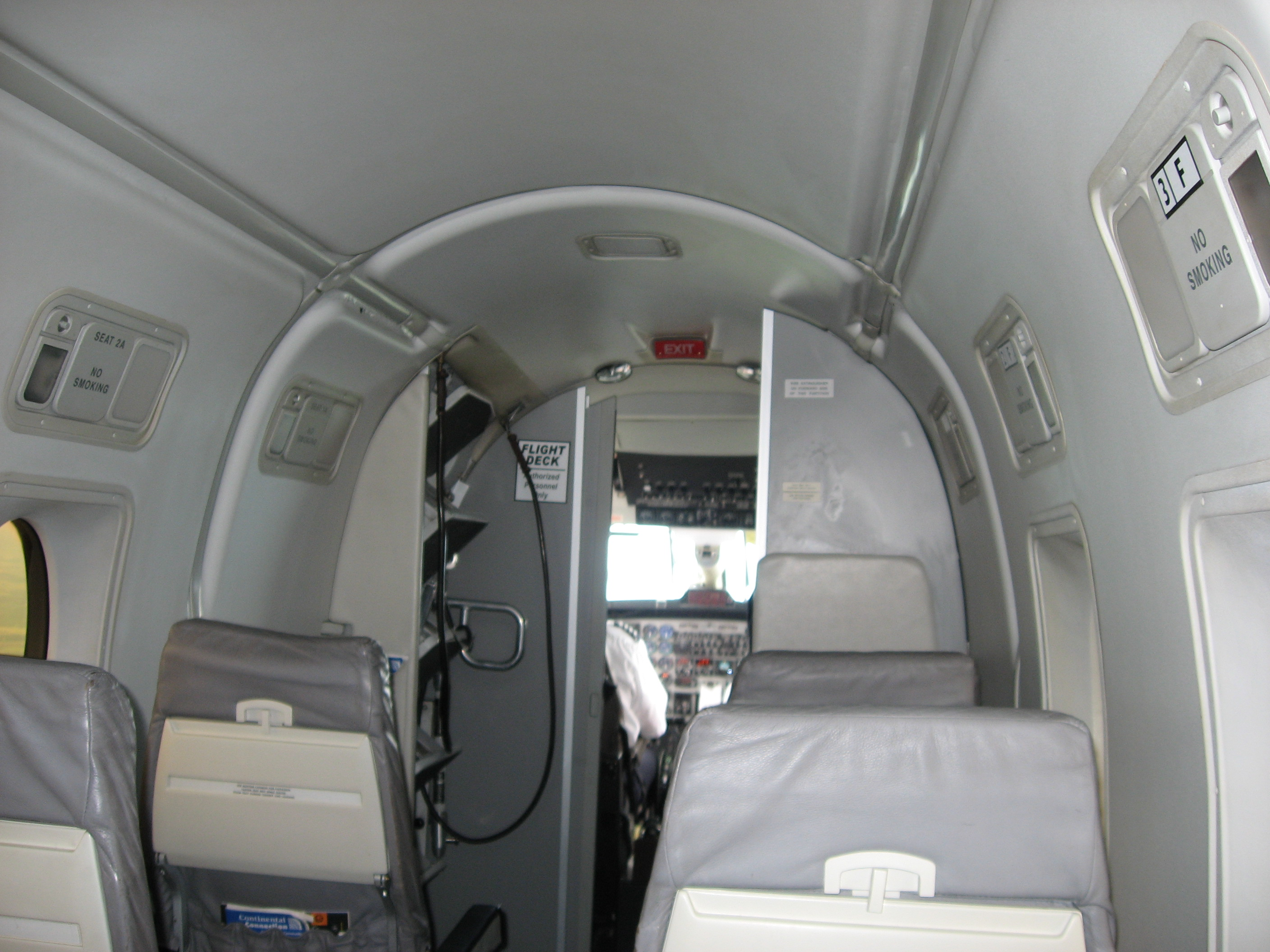
Facing forward in the passenger cabin of a former CommutAir Beechcraft 1900D

Old logo of the CommuteAir until 2023.

The airline was established in 1989, with headquarters at Clinton County Airport in Plattsburgh, New York. Operations began on August 1, 1989, as a marketing affiliate of USAir.

The airline changed affiliations to Continental Airlines in late 2000, when US Airways and CommuteAir failed to reach a mutually acceptable extension agreement, and CommuteAir decided not to renew the codeshare agreement. In July 2001, the company announced plans to downsize its fleet and workforce by approximately half and change the route structure of the airline. In early 2002, the company began a "micro-hub" operation based in Albany, New York. At its high point in 2003 and 2004, the hub served 21 cities within the Northeast and Canada with a fleet of Beechcraft 1900s. Service was also provided out of Boston's Logan International Airport to several Northeast cities.

In January 2003, CommuteAir announced an agreement with Continental to feed the latter's Cleveland, Ohio hub. Service commenced on March 16, 2003, serving Kalamazoo, Michigan and Elmira, New York. Two cities were added the following month and by August 2003, CommuteAir served 12 cities from the Cleveland hub.

CommuteAir leased sixteen Bombardier Q200 aircraft from Horizon Air in 2006. The following year, the Beech 1900s were phased out.

On October 30, 2007, the company moved all remaining operations from Clinton County Airport, due to the closure of the airport. All operations were then conducted out of Cleveland Hopkins International Airport.

On October 2, 2008, the company began operations out of Newark Liberty International Airport, following Continental Airlines plan to adjust to the softening industry.

CommuteAir's pilot group voted for union representation by the Air Line Pilots Association in 2008. That same year, Continental Airlines announced that it would cut flights and more than 3,000 jobs. Subsequently, it was announced that some of CommuteAir's Cleveland flights would be eliminated as part of Continental's cutbacks.

In 2010, following the merger of United and Continental, CommuteAir became a United Express carrier and United Airlines asked CommuteAir to obtain five Bombardier Q300s. Two of the aircraft were allocated to Cleveland services and three aircraft were allocated to Newark services.

In 2012, CommuteAir opened a hub at Washington-Dulles International Airport.

In July 2014, CommuteAir closed its pilot base at Cleveland Hopkins International Airport, after United Airlines withdrew its Cleveland hub. CommuteAir also closed its Cleveland maintenance base, and replaced it with a new maintenance base in Albany, New York.

On November 9, 2015, CommuteAir announced that it has reached an agreement with United Airlines to significantly increase the number of airplanes flown under the United Express brand by adding Embraer ERJ 145 jet operations to the company's existing fleet of Bombardier turbo-prop aircraft.

In July 2016, CommuteAir began commercial service with its inaugural flight on the ERJ 145 jet from Washington, D.C. to Columbia, SC.

In September 2017, the Q300 was phased out and in January 2018, the Q200 was phased out, marking the end of turbo-prop operations.

On July 30, 2020, it was announced that United Airlines had decided to end its contract with fellow United Express affiliate ExpressJet and transferred these operations to CommuteAir. CommuteAir became the sole operator of the United Express ERJ 145 fleet.

On September 30, 2020, CommuteAir started servicing United's Houston hub and on March 28, 2021, it began service out of Denver International Airport. The latter marks the return of the ERJ 145 to the Denver United Express fleet since COVID and the cessation of operations by Trans States Airlines. CommuteAir operated its final flights from Denver in May 2024 before closing its pilot and flight attendant bases and consolidating its operations in Houston and Washington-Dulles.

On January 19, 2023, hacker maia arson crimew announced she had compromised web servers belonging to CommuteAir and obtained access to flight and personnel scheduling systems, the personal data of airline staff, and a 2019 copy of the US Government No Fly List.

On May 19, 2025, CommuteAir announced closure of its Lincoln Airport (LNK) base. All operations at LNK ceased on July 18, 2025.

== Destinations ==
List of destinations (since December 11, 2025)
City	Country (Subdivision)	IATA	Airport	Notes
Birmingham	United States (Alabama)	BHM	Birmingham–Shuttlesworth International Airport	
Huntsville	United States (Alabama)	HSV	Huntsville International Airport	
Mobile	United States (Alabama)	MOB	Mobile Regional Airport	
Bentonville	United States (Arkansas)	XNA	Northwest Arkansas National Airport	
Little Rock	United States (Arkansas)	LIT	Clinton National Airport	
Hartford	United States (Connecticut)	BDL	Bradley International Airport	
Panama City	United States (Florida)	ECP	Northwest Florida Beaches International Airport	
Pensacola	United States (Florida)	PNS	Pensacola International Airport	
Wichita	United States (Kansas)	ICT	Wichita Dwight D. Eisenhower National Airport	
Cincinnati / Northern Kentucky	United States (Kentucky)	CVG	Cincinnati/Northern Kentucky International Airport	
Baton Rouge	United States (Louisiana)	BTR	Baton Rouge Metropolitan Airport	
Lake Charles	United States (Louisiana)	LCH	Lake Charles Regional Airport	
Lafayette	United States (Louisiana)	LFT	Lafayette Regional Airport	
Portland	United States (Maine)	PWM	Portland International Jetport	
Gulfport / Biloxi	United States (Mississippi)	GPT	Gulfport–Biloxi International Airport	
Jackson	United States (Mississippi)	JAN	Jackson–Medgar Wiley Evers International Airport	
Springfield	United States (Missouri)	SGF	Springfield–Branson National Airport	
Hobbs	United States (New Mexico)	HOB	Lea County Regional Airport	
Albany	United States (New York)	ALB	Albany International Airport	Maintenance base
Buffalo	United States (New York)	BUF	Buffalo Niagara International Airport	
Ithaca	United States (New York)	ITH	Ithaca Tompkins International Airport	
Rochester	United States (New York)	ROC	Greater Rochester International Airport	
Syracuse	United States (New York)	SYR	Syracuse Hancock International Airport	
Cleveland	United States (Ohio)	CLE	Cleveland Hopkins International Airport	Headquarters
Columbus	United States (Ohio)	CMH	John Glenn Columbus International Airport	
Dayton	United States (Ohio)	DAY	Dayton International Airport	
Oklahoma City	United States (Oklahoma)	OKC	OKC Will Rogers International Airport	
Tulsa	United States (Oklahoma)	TUL	Tulsa International Airport	
Harrisburg	United States (Pennsylvania)	MDT	Harrisburg International Airport	
Philadelphia	United States (Pennsylvania)	PHL	Philadelphia International Airport	
Pittsburgh	United States (Pennsylvania)	PIT	Pittsburgh International Airport	
Wilkes-Barre / Scranton	United States (Pennsylvania)	AVP	Wilkes-Barre/Scranton International Airport	
State College	United States (Pennsylvania)	SCE	State College Regional Airport	
Providence	United States (Rhode Island)	PVD	T.F. Green International Airport	
Charleston	United States (South Carolina)	CHS	Charleston International Airport	
Columbia	United States (South Carolina)	CAE	Columbia Metropolitan Airport	
Greenville / Spartanburg	United States (South Carolina)	GSP	Greenville-Spartanburg International Airport	
Myrtle Beach	United States (South Carolina)	MYR	Myrtle Beach International Airport	
Knoxville	United States (Tennessee)	TYS	McGhee Tyson Airport	
Nashville	United States (Tennessee)	BNA	Nashville International Airport	
Amarillo	United States (Texas)	AMA	Rick Husband Amarillo International Airport	
Brownsville	United States (Texas)	BRO	Brownsville/South Padre Island International Airport	
Corpus Christi	United States (Texas)	CRP	Corpus Christi International Airport	
El Paso	United States (Texas)	ELP	El Paso International Airport	
Harlingen	United States (Texas)	HRL	Valley International Airport	
Houston	United States (Texas)	IAH	George Bush Intercontinental Airport	Hub
Laredo	United States (Texas)	LRD	Laredo International Airport	
Lubbock	United States (Texas)	LBB	Lubbock Preston Smith International Airport	
McAllen	United States (Texas)	MFE	McAllen Miller International Airport	
Midland	United States (Texas)	MAF	Midland International Air and Space Port	
Burlington	United States (Vermont)	BTV	Burlington International Airport	
Charlottesville	United States (Virginia)	CHO	Charlottesville-Albemarle Airport	
Norfolk	United States (Virginia)	ORF	Norfolk International Airport	
Richmond	United States (Virginia)	RIC	Richmond International Airport	
Roanoke	United States (Virginia)	ROA	Roanoke Regional Airport	
Washington, D.C./ Northern Virginia	United States (Virginia)	IAD	Washington Dulles International Airport	Hub
Puebla City	Mexico (Puebla)	PBC	Hermanos Serdán International Airport	

== Fleet ==
As of June 2026, CommuteAir operates the following aircraft:

Aircraft	In service	Orders	Passengers				Operated for	Notes
Aircraft	In service	Orders	F	Y+	Y	Total	Operated for	Notes
Embraer ERJ 145XR	59	—	—	—	50	50	United Express	
Embraer 170	1	—	—	—	76	76	CommuteAir	Operated as required for charter operations.
Total	60							

=== Historical fleet ===
The CommuteAir fleet was once composed entirely of Beechcraft 1900 aircraft, operated for US Airways Express and later for Continental Connection.

CommuteAir operated the final turboprop flight for United Express on Sunday, January 7, 2018. This flight, UCA4909/C54909 between Syracuse and Washington–Dulles was operated by tail number N363PH. It marked the end of an era for both CommuteAir and United Express. The Bombardier Q200 was subsequently ferried to Roswell International Air Center for retirement.

- Beechcraft 1900C
- Beechcraft 1900D
- Bombardier Q200
- Bombardier Q300

== Incidents and accidents ==
On January 3, 1992, CommutAir Flight 4821, a Beechcraft 1900C operating for USAir Express was flying from Plattsburgh, New York to Newark, New Jersey, with stops in Saranac Lake and Albany in New York, crashed into a wooded mountaintop as it was landing at Adirondack Regional Airport. Of the four people on board (two passengers and two crew), two were killed while the other two sustained serious injuries. The cause of the crash was determined to be pilot error in establishing a stabilized approach and cross-checking instruments. Factors related to the accident were: weather conditions and possible precipitation static interference, caused by inadequate grounding between the radome and fuselage that could have resulted in unreliable glide slope indications."

On March 4, 2019, CommutAir Flight 4933, operating for United Express, landed off the runway during its second attempt at landing in Presque Isle International Airport. The left main landing gear was torn from the aircraft and embedded in one of the two rear engines. The accident resulted in a loss of the airframe. Passengers and crew were evacuated, with three passengers and one crew member requiring treatment for minor injuries. The National Transportation Safety Board (NTSB) attributed the accident to confirmation bias which prompted the pilots to continue descending even though they could not see the runway due to snow. Contributing factors were poor decision-making by the captain, fatigue of the first officer, and misalignment of the localizer caused by snow. NTSB criticized the airline's training practices, as the captain had been promoted to that status despite a history of training failures and disciplinary action. NTSB also noted that at least six CommutAir flight crews had noticed the localizer misalignment prior to the accident but none had reported it under the airline's safety program until after the event; one CommutAir crew had reported the problem to the Federal Aviation Administration beforehand, but the agency did not issue a NOTAM because protocol dictated that more than one report was required.

== See also ==
- Air transportation in the United States
