= CommutAir Flight 4821 =

1992 aviation accident

Coordinates: 44.421°N 74.191°W

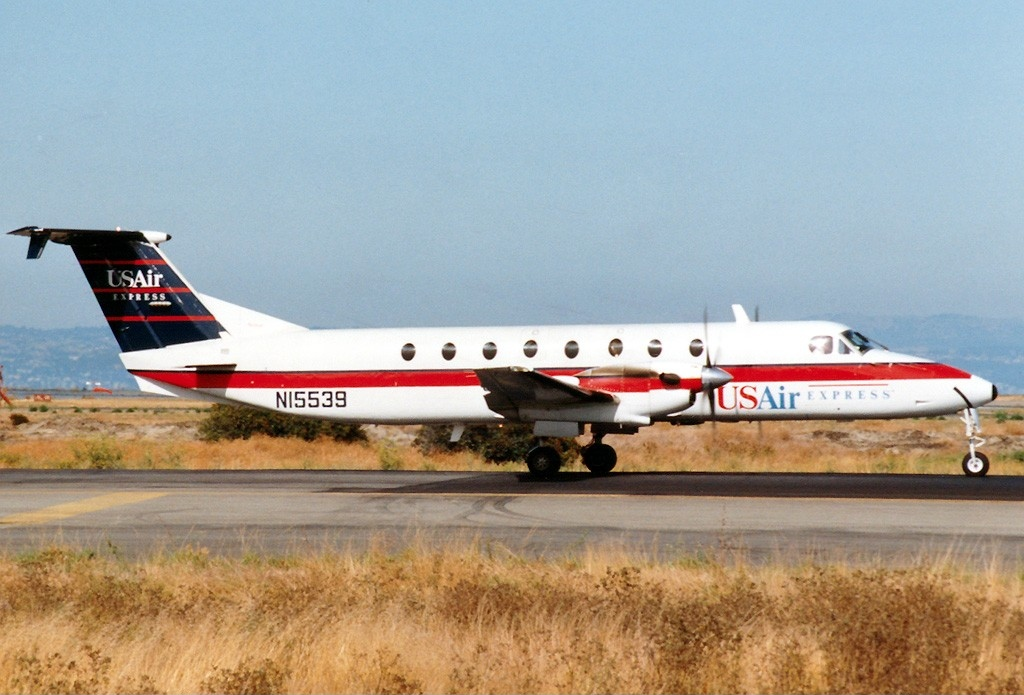
- A Beechcraft 1900C similar to the accident aircraft

Accident
- Date: January 3, 1992
- Summary: Controlled flight into terrain due to pilot error
- Site: Gabriels, near Adirondack Regional Airport, Saranac Lake, New York, United States

Aircraft
- Aircraft type: Beechcraft 1900C
- Operator: CommutAir doing business as USAir Express
- Registration: N55000
- Flight origin: Plattsburgh International Airport, Plattsburgh, New York
- 1st stopover: Adirondack Regional Airport, Saranac Lake, New York
- Last stopover: Albany International Airport, Albany, New York
- Destination: Newark Liberty International Airport, Newark, New Jersey
- Occupants: 4
- Passengers: 2
- Crew: 2
- Fatalities: 2
- Injuries: 2
- Survivors: 2

On Friday, January 3, 1992, a Beechcraft 1900C operating CommutAir Flight 4821 crashed into a wooded hillside near Gabriels, New York while conducting an ILS approach to Runway 23 at the Adirondack Regional Airport. The cause of the accident was determined to be pilot error. There were two people killed in the crash, and two survivors.

== Accident ==
Flight 4821 was a regularly scheduled early morning USAir Express flight from Plattsburgh, New York, to Newark, New Jersey, with intermediate stops in Saranac Lake and Albany, New York. The crew for Flight 4821 were Captain Kevin St. Germain, 30, and First Officer Dean Montana, 23. There were two passengers on board, one of which was an off-duty CommutAir employee.

Shortly before the crash occurred, the aircraft had contacted CommutAir officials on the ground at the airport. During the descent into Saranac Lake, the crew descended below the glide slope and crashed into a hill at 5:45am. First Officer Montana and the company employee passenger were killed. Captain St. Germain and the other passenger survived the crash with injuries.

== Investigation ==
The aircraft was new and the crew was experienced. Immediately following the accident, there was no clear cause.

The aircraft was not required to be equipped with a flight data recorder (FDR), therefore, a flight data recorder was not present. The aircraft was equipped with a cockpit voice recorder (CVR) but it was burned to the point that the data inside were not usable. The National Transportation Safety Board (NTSB) used aircraft position data from air traffic control, the aircraft wreckage, survivor interviews, and weather information to find its probable cause.

The NTSB blamed the pilots for the crash. Captain St. Germain failed to stabilize the approach, cross check the instruments, and descended below the minimum altitude, while First Officer Montana failed to monitor the approach. The contributing factors to the crash were weather and possible precipitation static interference, which could have caused unreliable glide slope indications.
