= New York State Route 192 =

Former highway in New York

New York State Route 192
- Map of northeastern New York with NY 192 highlighted in red. Its pre-1980 alignment to Bloomingdale is highlighted in pink

Route information
- Maintained by NYSDOT
- Length: 7.35 mi (11.83 km)
- Existed: 1930–March 28, 1989

Major junctions
- West end: NY 30 in Brighton
- East end: NY 86 in Harrietstown

Location
- Country: United States
- State: New York
- Counties: Franklin

Highway system
- New York Highways; Interstate; US; State; Reference; Parkways
← NY 191	→ NY 192A

New York State Route 192 (NY 192) was a 7.35-mile (11.83 km) long east–west state highway in Franklin County, New York, in the United States. The western terminus of the route was at an intersection with NY 30 in the hamlet of Paul Smiths within the town of Brighton. Its eastern terminus was at a junction with NY 86 near the Adirondack Regional Airport in the town of Harrietstown. In between, NY 192 served the hamlet of Gabriels.

NY 192 was assigned as part of the 1930 renumbering of state highways in New York to an alignment extending from Paul Smiths to Bloomingdale. A suffixed route of NY 192, NY 192A, was assigned in the 1950s to provide a signed connection between NY 192 near Gabriels and then-NY 86 in Harrietstown. NY 192A became part of NY 192 in 1980, and NY 192 became part of NY 86 on March 28, 1989.

== Route description ==
NY 192 began at an intersection with NY 30 in the hamlet of Paul Smiths within the town of Brighton in Franklin County. The highway headed to the northeast, passing Cooler Pond to the south and Church Pond to the north. Just north of Church Pond was Osgood Pond, which was accessible at the first intersection, which was White Pine Road. NY 192 then headed eastward, intersecting with County Route 31 (CR 31, named Jones Pond Road) in the hamlet of Paul Smiths Easy Street. The highway turned to the southeast, intersecting with another county route and passing Brighton Town Park. At the intersection with CR 60 near the park, NY 192 entered Gabriels.

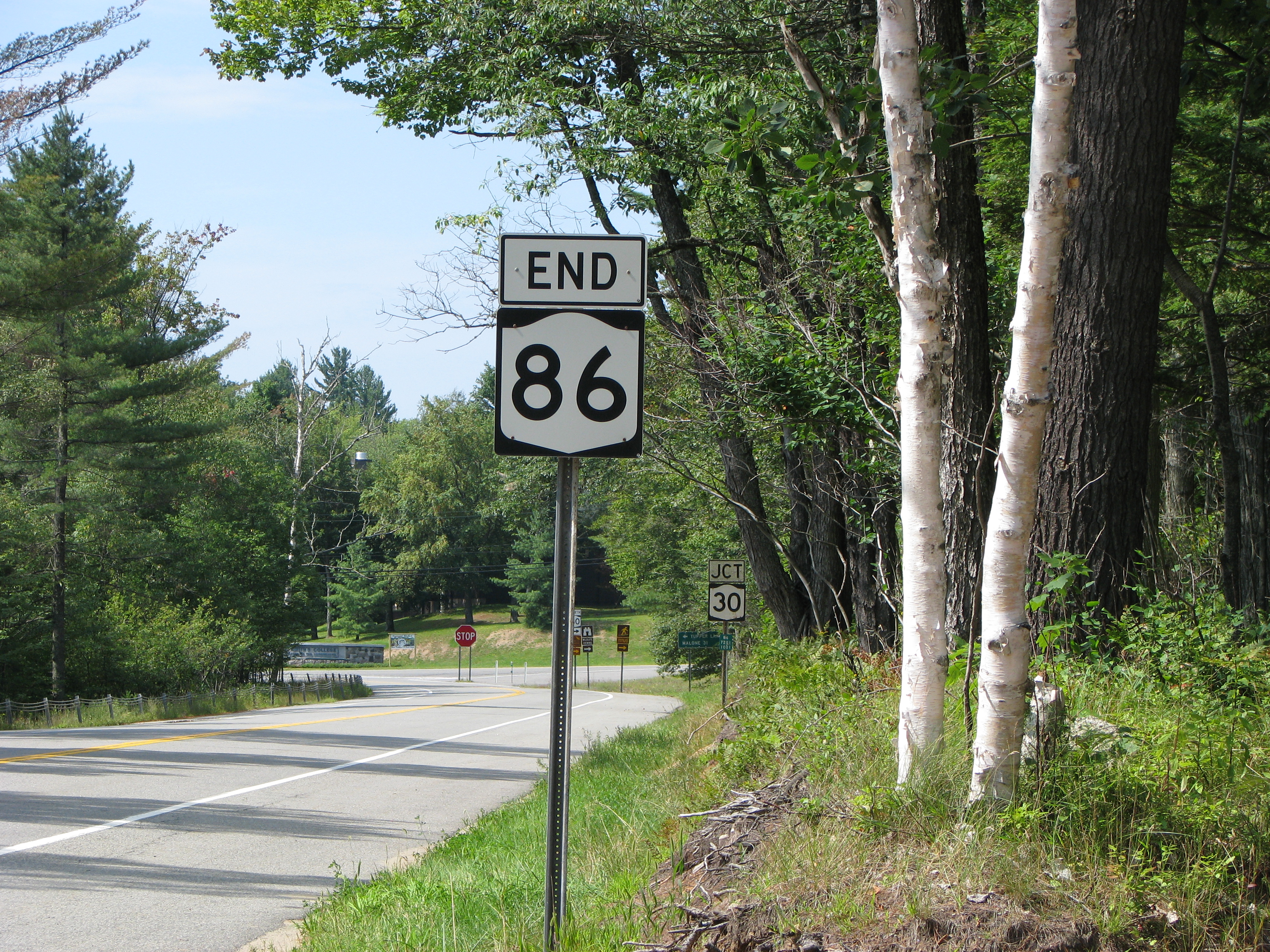
NY 86's current western terminus in Paul Smiths. This junction was NY 192's western terminus.

NY 192 then continued to the southeast, intersecting with CR 55, its former routing eastward to NY 3 in Bloomingdale. At CR 55, NY 192 curved southward and passed into the town of Harrietstown. The route ended shortly afterward at a junction with NY 86 in the hamlet of Harrietstown 2 miles (3.2 km) east of the Adirondack Regional Airport.

== History ==
When NY 3 was assigned in 1924, it followed a significantly different routing through the North Country than it does today. NY 3 entered Franklin County near Hogansburg and served Malone, Paul Smiths, Gabriels, and Harrietstown before leaving the county near Saranac Lake. In the 1930 renumbering of state highways in New York, NY 3 was rerouted east of Watertown to follow its modern alignment through the North Country. The portion of NY 3's former routing from Harrietstown to a junction southeast of Gabriels was designated as NY 408 while the segment between Paul Smiths and the vicinity of Gabriels became part of NY 192, an east–west highway extending from Paul Smiths to the realigned NY 3 in Bloomingdale.

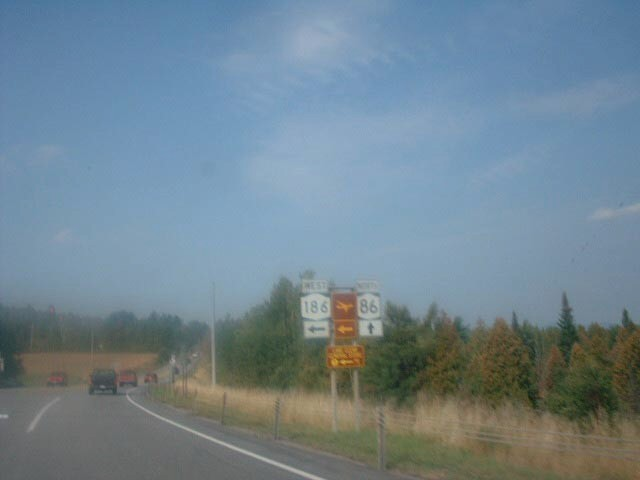
The junction of modern NY 86 and NY 186 in Harrietstown, NY 192's final eastern terminus

NY 408 and the eastern half of NY 192 were included as part of NY 365 c. 1932. The new route extended from NY 5 southwest of Oneida to U.S. Route 9 (US 9) in Plattsburgh. NY 365 initially overlapped both NY 192 and NY 408; however, NY 408 was removed c. 1938, leaving only NY 365 on the Harrietstown–Gabriels roadway. NY 192, meanwhile, continued to overlap NY 365 from Gabriels to Bloomingdale. In the mid-1940s, NY 365 was rerouted between Wawbeek and Bloomingdale to overlap NY 3 instead. The portion of NY 365's former routing from Harrietstown to Gabriels was not initially assigned a new designation.

The Harrietstown–Gabriels highway became a signed route once again in the early 1950s when it became NY 192A. Both NY 192 and NY 192A remained unchanged through the late 1970s. On January 7, 1980, NY 192A was supplanted by a realigned NY 192. Maintenance of NY 192's former routing between Gabriels and Bloomingdale was transferred to the counties it ran through—namely Franklin and Essex—in stages. The Franklin County portion was given to the county on April 1, 1980, while the section in Essex County was transferred to county control on April 1, 1985, as part of highway maintenance swaps between the state of New York and Franklin and Essex counties. On March 28, 1989, NY 192 was supplanted by a realigned NY 86.

== Major intersections ==
The entire route was in Franklin County.

Location	mi	km	Destinations	Notes
Brighton	0.00	0.00	NY 30	Western terminus; hamlet of Paul Smiths
Brighton	4.92	7.92	CR 55	Former routing of NY 192
Harrietstown	7.35	11.83	NY 86	Eastern terminus
1.000 mi = 1.609 km; 1.000 km = 0.621 mi

== See also ==
- List of county routes in Essex County, New York
- List of county routes in Franklin County, New York
