= US Airways Express =

Regional airline of the United States (1989–2015)

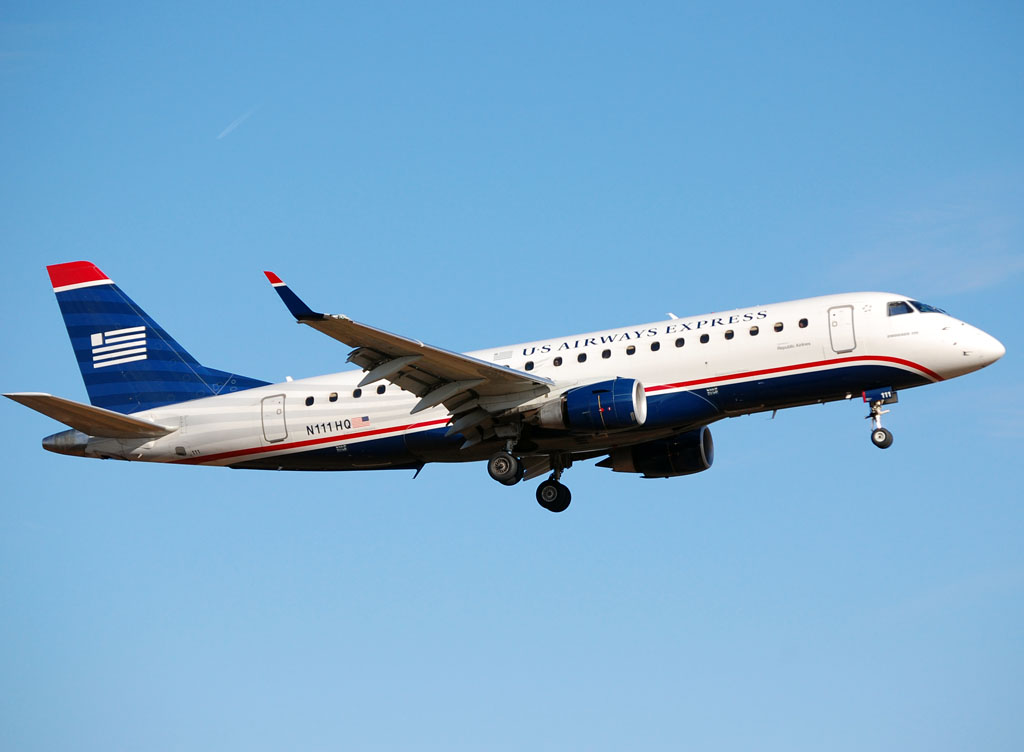
- US Airways Express Embraer 175 in 2006
IATA	ICAO	Call sign
ZW; YV; PT; OH; YX; OO; 9L	AWI; ASH; PDT; JIA; RPA; SKW; CJC	WISCONSIN; AIR SHUTTLE; PIEDMONT; BLUE STREAK; BRICKYARD; SKYWEST; COLGAN
- Founded: 1967 (as Allegheny Commuter)
- Commenced operations: 1989 (as USAir Express)
- Ceased operations: October 17, 2015 (merged into American Eagle)
- Hubs: Charlotte; Philadelphia; Pittsburgh (1989–2004); Phoenix–Sky Harbor; Washington–National
- Frequent-flyer program: Dividend Miles
- Alliance: Star Alliance (affiliate; 2004–2014); Oneworld (affiliate; 2014–2015)
- Parent company: US Airways (1989–2014); American Airlines (2014–2015)
- Headquarters: Crystal City, Virginia (1967–2004); Tempe, Arizona (2005–2015)
- Key people: Doug Parker (CEO); Derek Kerr (CFO)

US Airways Express was the brand name for the regional affiliate of US Airways, under which a number of individually owned commuter air carriers and regional airlines operate short and medium haul routes. This code sharing service was previously operated as USAir Express. Mainline carriers often outsource to regional airlines to operate services in order to increase frequency, serve routes that would not sustain larger aircraft, or for other competitive reasons. US Airways Express operations were conducted from smaller markets in the United States, Canada, and the Bahamas primarily centered on US Airways' major hubs and focus cities.

Upon the completion of US Airways' merger process with American Airlines, US Airways Express was rebranded as American Eagle on October 17, 2015.

== History ==
US Airways Express traced its beginnings to 1967, when Henson Airlines began operating as Allegheny Commuter, a feeder carrier for Allegheny Airlines, predecessor to US Airways. The initial route was Baltimore-Hagerstown. This is generally credited as the industry's first codeshare agreement and the first major airline to use another airline as its commuter partner.

Throughout the 1970s, many other commuter airlines would join the Allegheny Commuter system providing feeder service from small communities for Allegheny Airlines. Allegheny Airlines was changed to USAir in 1979 however the feeder network still carried the name of Allegheny Commuter until 1989 when it was changed to USAir Express. In 1997 USAir changed its name again to US Airways at which time the feeder network became US Airways Express.

Two major carriers that merged into USAir in the late 1980s, Pacific Southwest Airlines (PSA) and Piedmont Airlines (1948-1989) had their corporate names retained to protect their trademarks. Henson Airlines later took on the name Piedmont Airlines and another USAir Express carrier, Jetstream International took on the name of PSA Airlines. The aircraft and other characteristics of the rebranded regional carriers bear no relation to their namesakes however many of the routes of Piedmont Airlines are former routes of the original Piedmont Airlines.

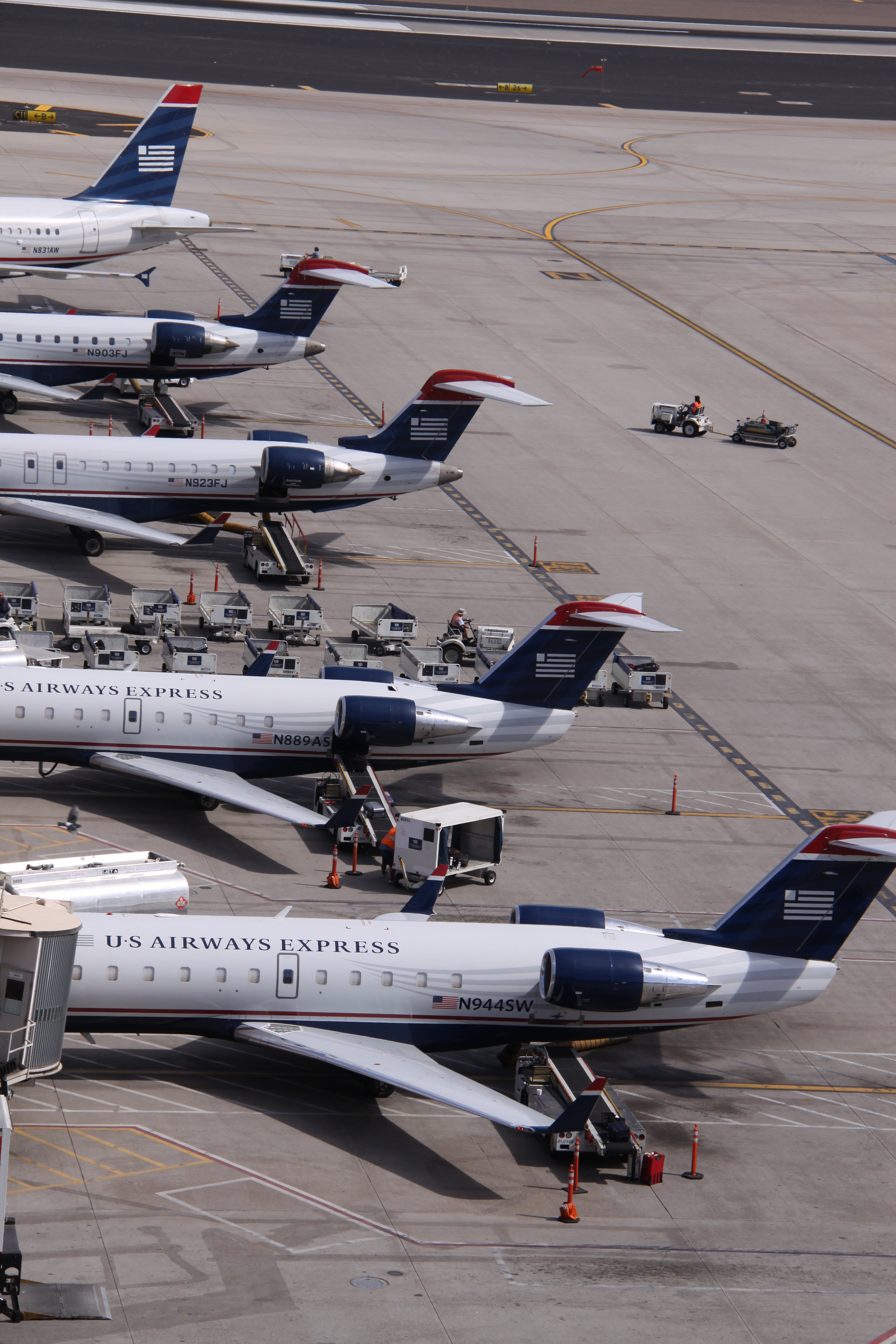
US Airways Express Aircraft lined up at Phoenix Sky Harbor Airport

The aircraft livery of US Airways Express aircraft was identical to US Airways' mainline colors except for the word Express, which is attached to the basic US Airways livery.

In April 2013, an internal memo distributed to American Eagle employees at American Airlines Group's subsidiaries: (OW) Executive Airlines and American Eagle; indicated the US Airways Express banner and marketing brand, were expected to be discontinued although the remaining and independently operating airline subsidiaries, were expected to continue but operated with American Eagle branded colors.

== Operators and fleet ==
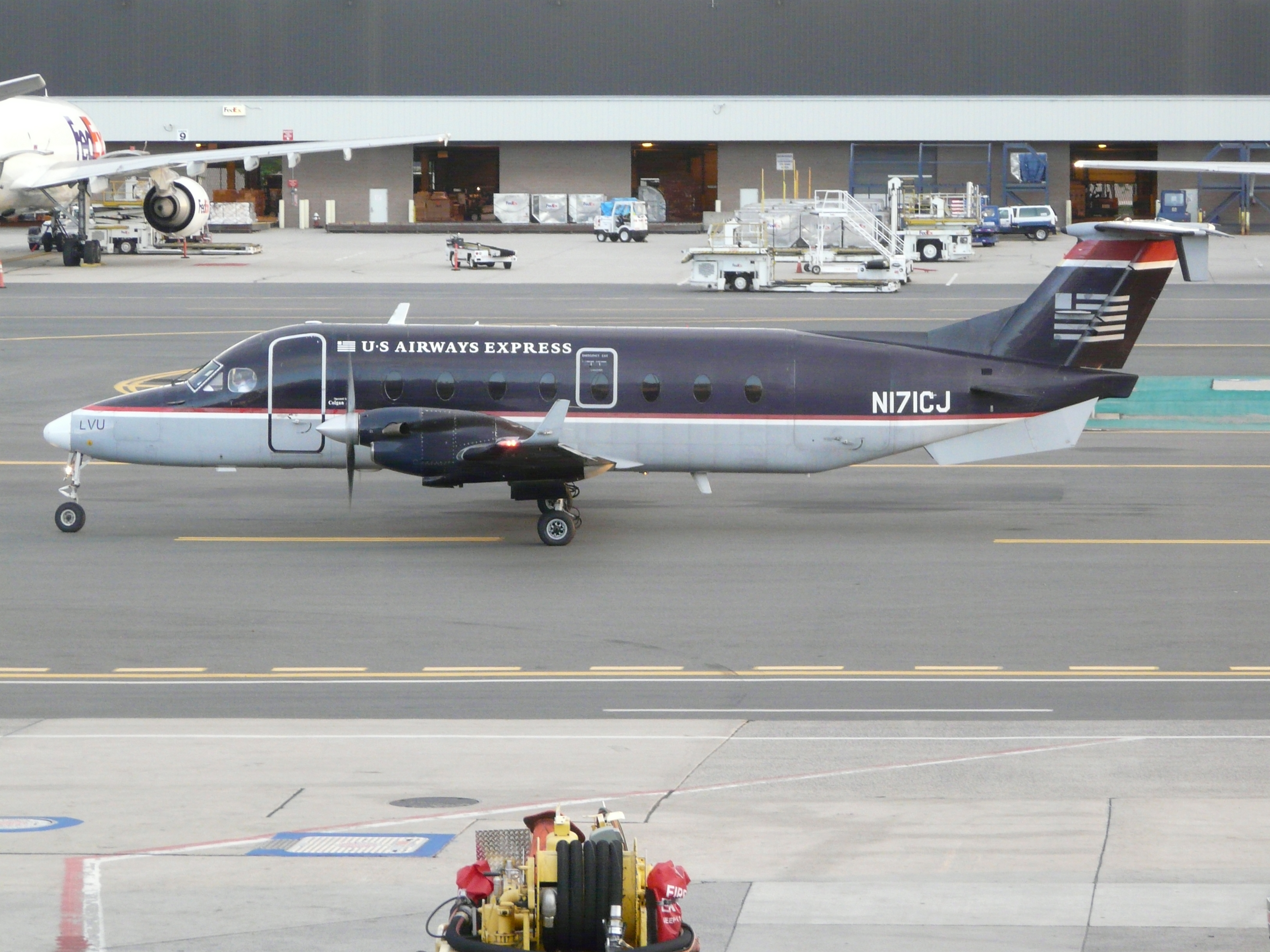
Colgan Air Beechcraft 1900D

=== Fleet ===
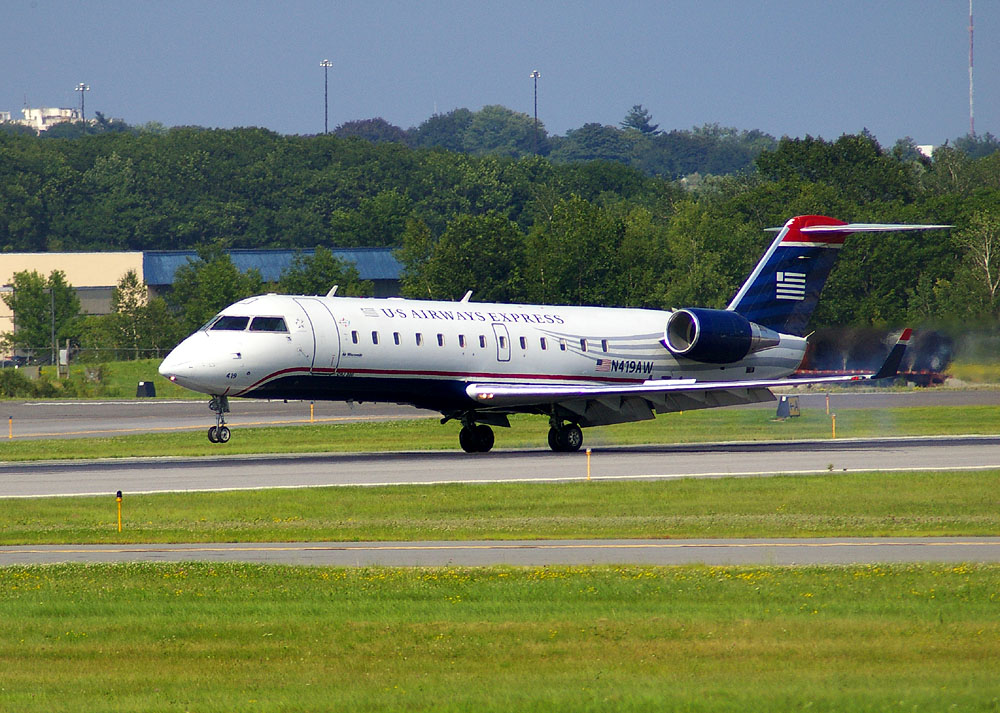
Air Wisconsin CRJ200 at Portland International Jetport in 2009

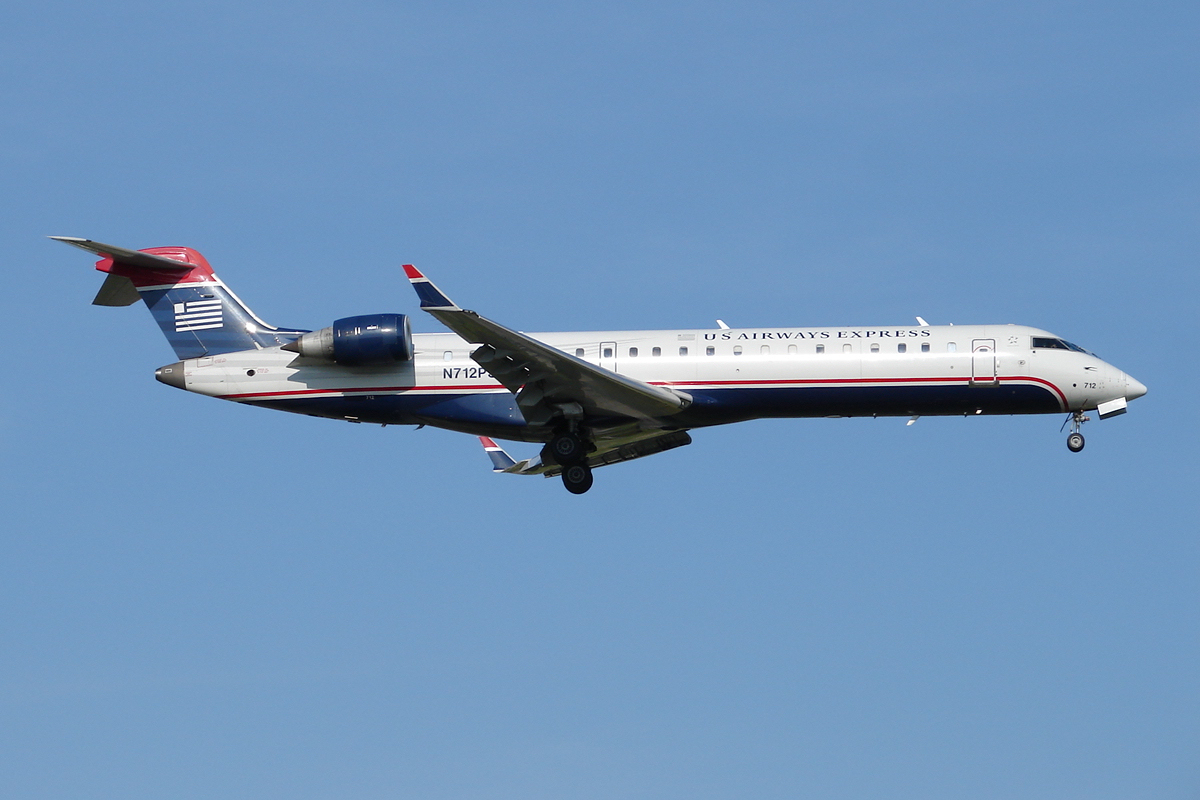
PSA Airlines CRJ-700

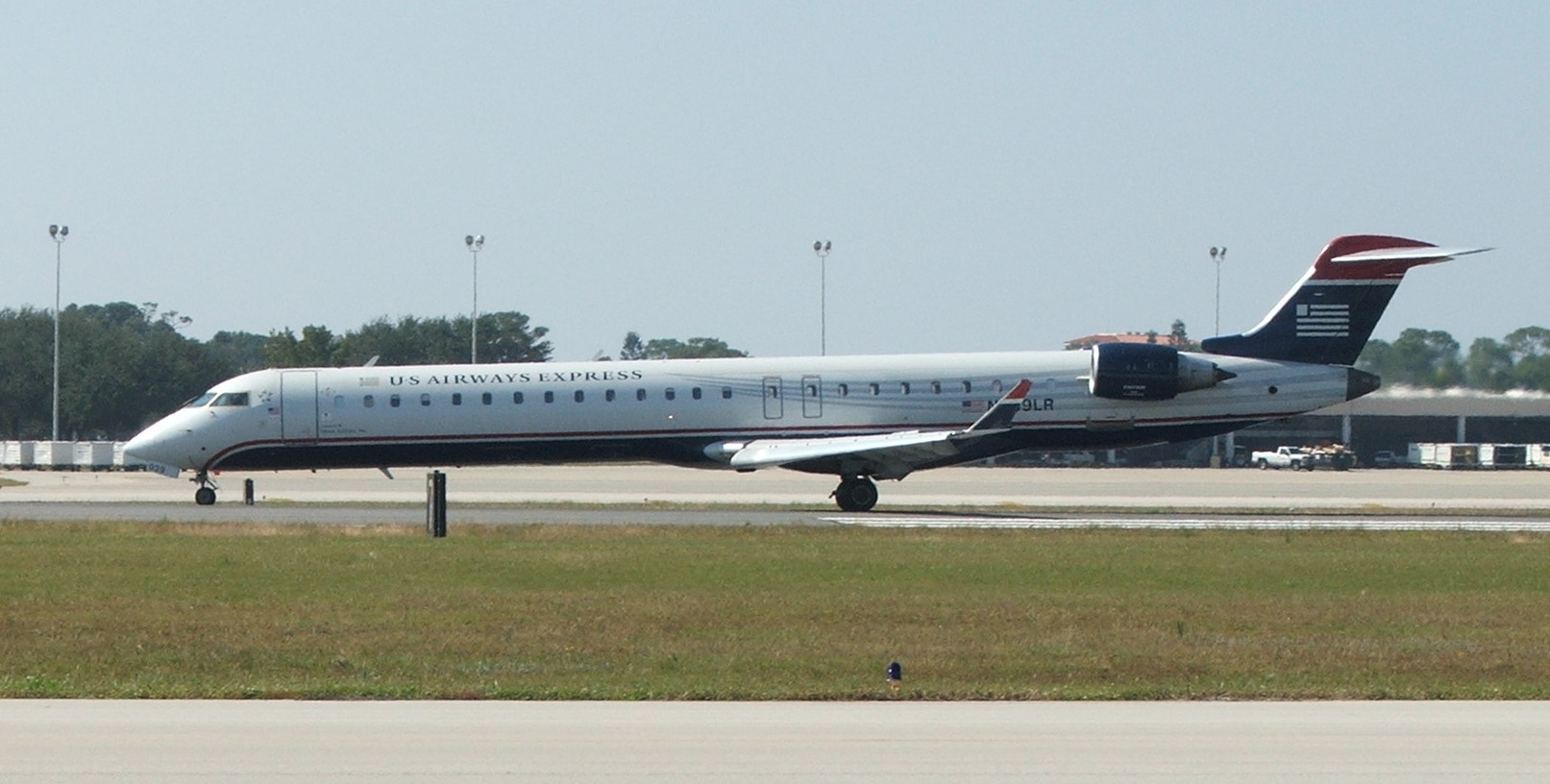
Mesa CRJ900 in the final US Airways livery beginning in 2005

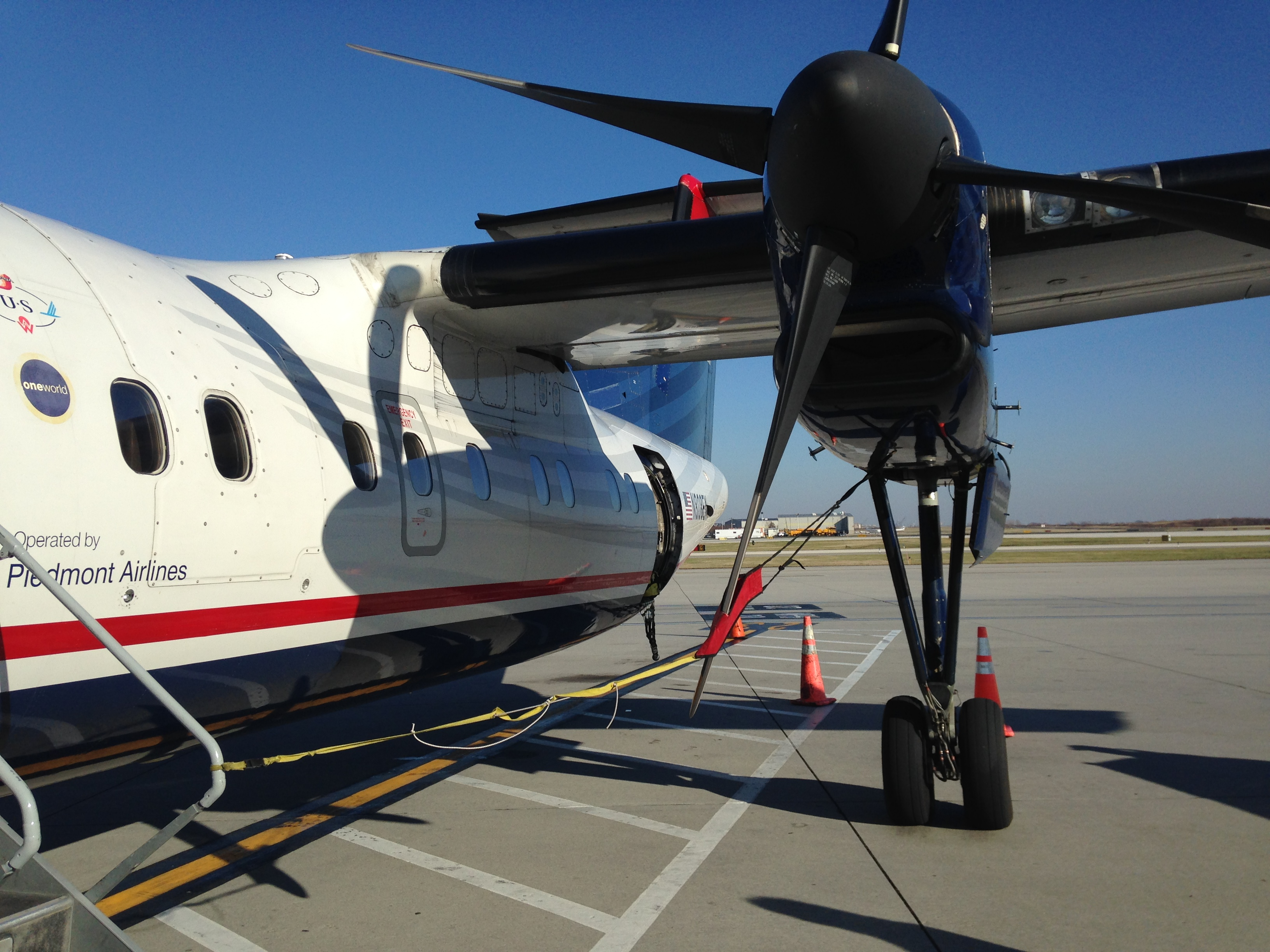
Piedmont Dash 8-100 ready for boarding at Tweed New Haven Airport in December 2014

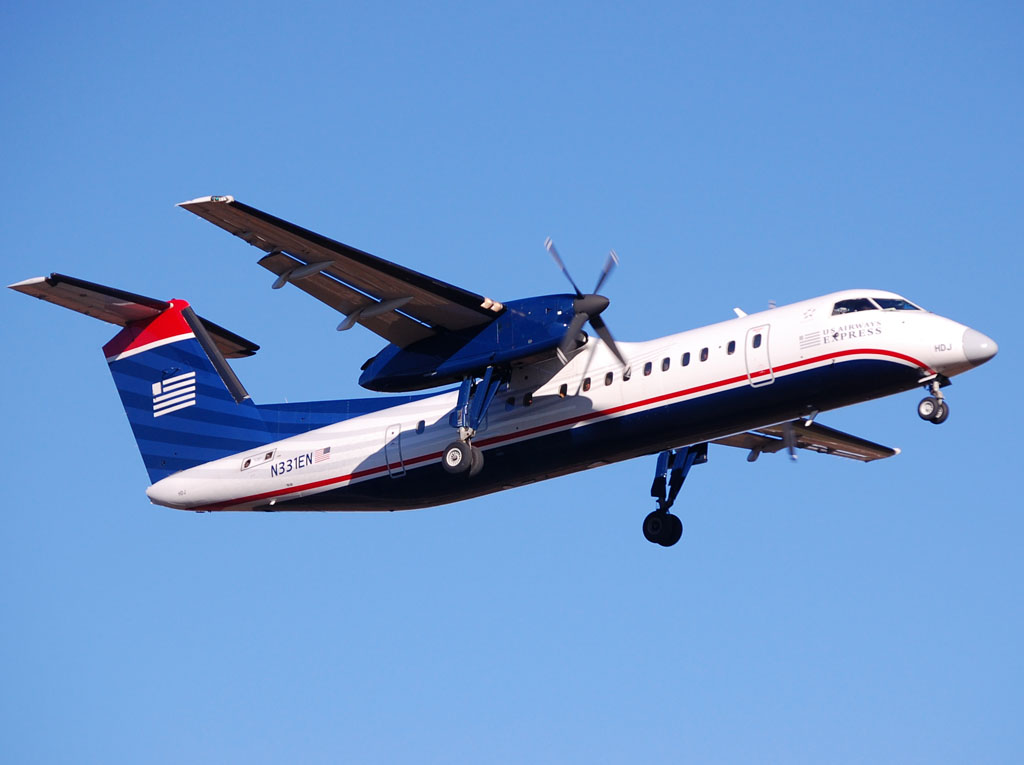
Piedmont Airlines Dash 8-300

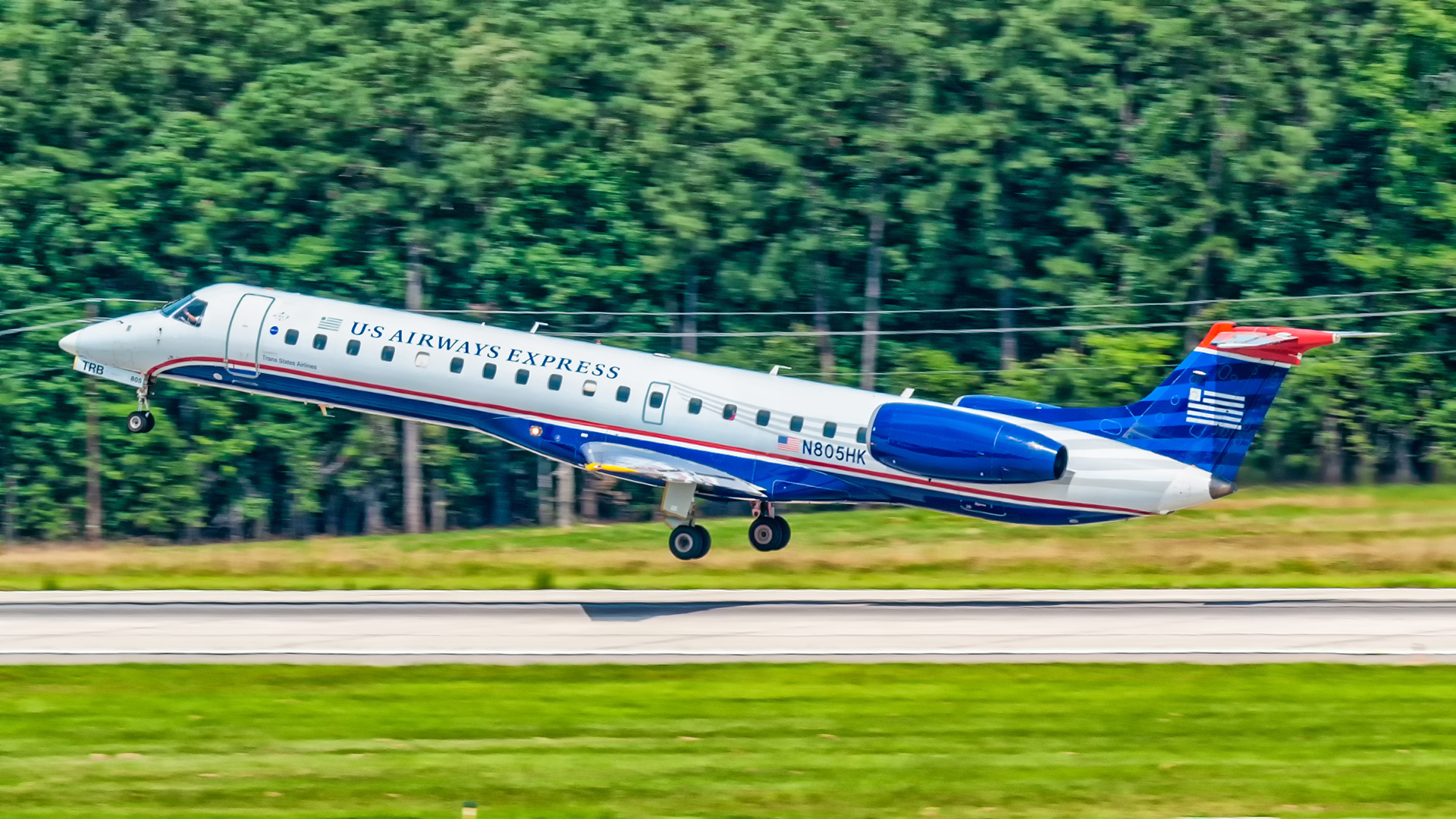
Trans States Airlines ERJ-145

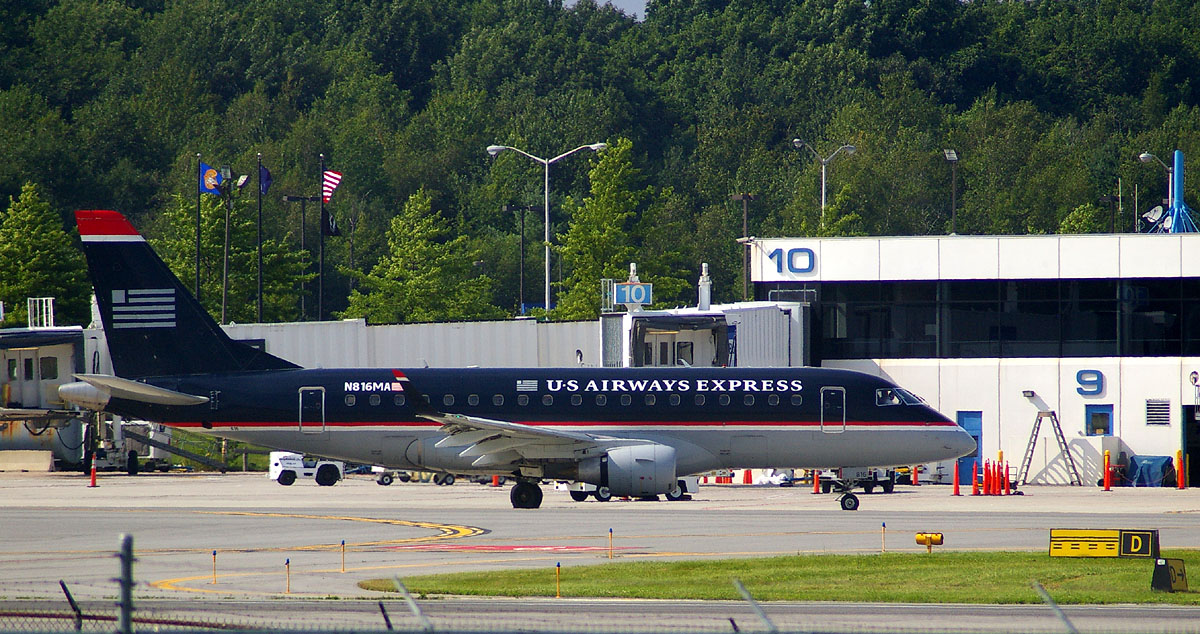
Mid-Atlantic Airways Embraer 170 in the 1997 livery

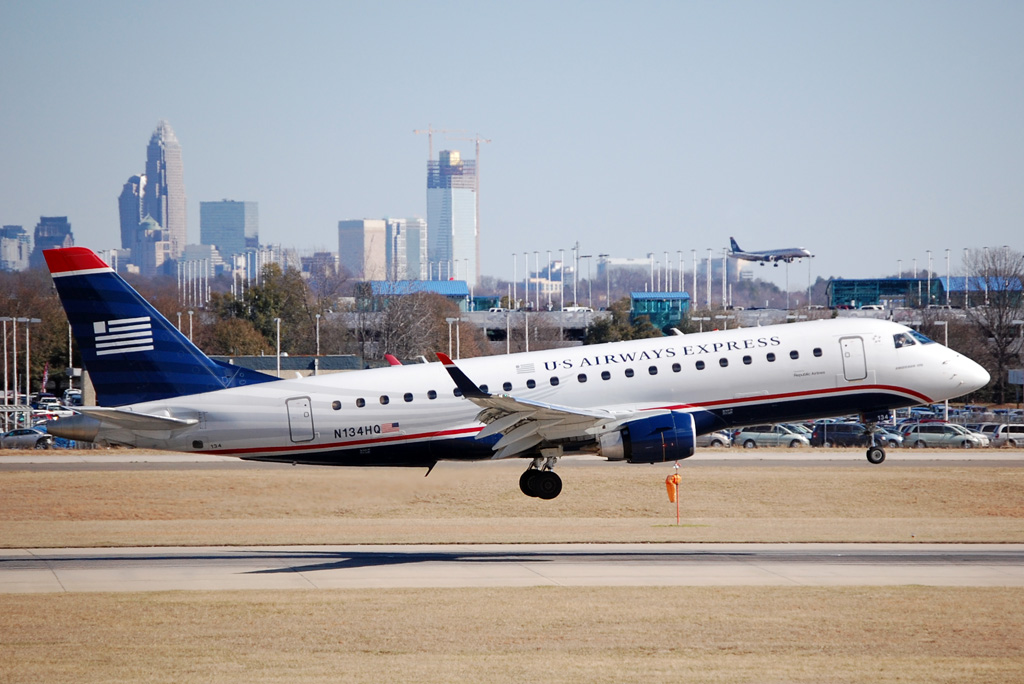
Republic Airlines Embraer 175

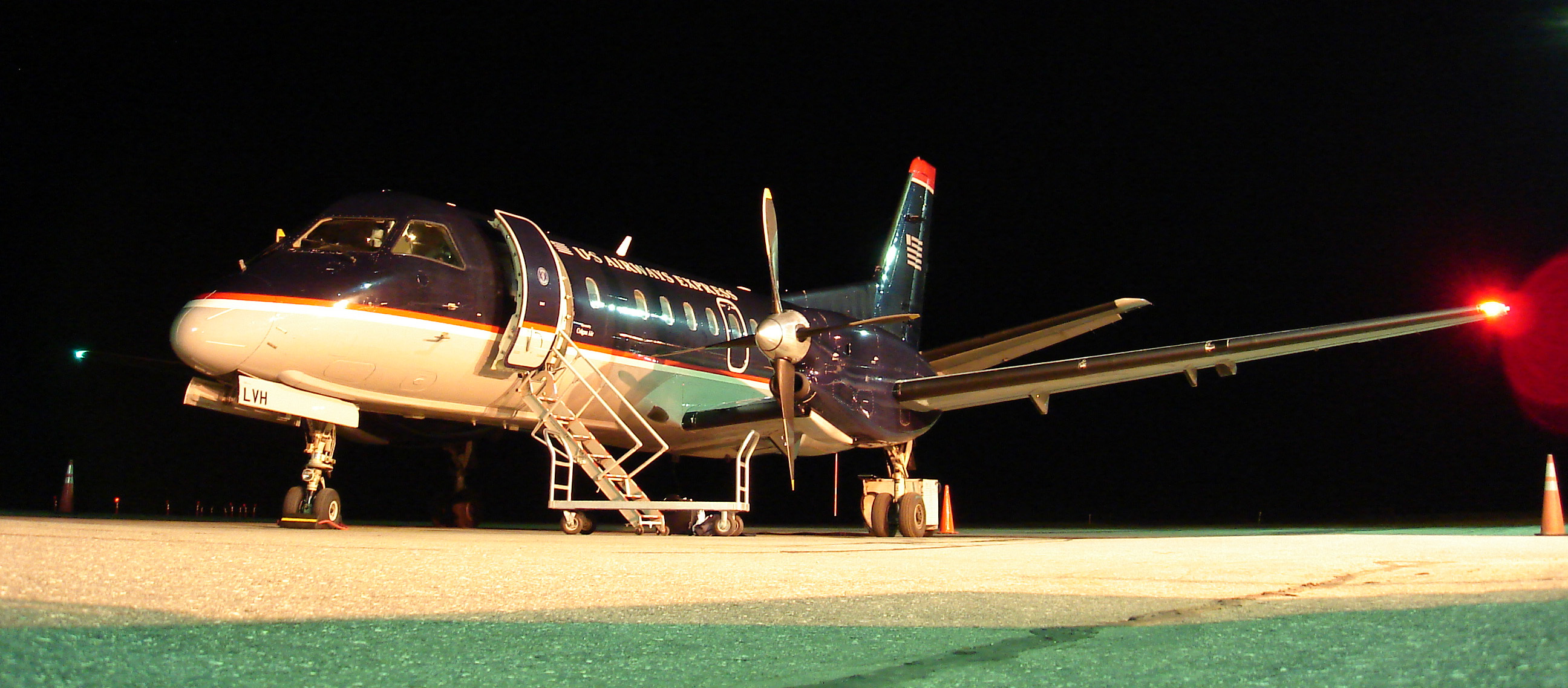
US Airways Express Saab 340 in 2005

US Airways Express fleet
Airline	IATA Service	ICAO Code	Callsign	Aircraft	In fleet	Passengers			Parent
Airline	IATA Service	ICAO Code	Callsign	Aircraft	In fleet	F	Y	Total	Parent
Air Wisconsin	ZW	AWI	Wisconsin	Bombardier CRJ200	67	–	50	50	CJT Holdings
Colgan Air	9L	CJC	Colgan	Beechcraft 1900D	11	–	19	19	Pinnacle Airlines Corp.
Colgan Air	9L	CJC	Colgan	Saab 340	23	–	34	34	Pinnacle Airlines Corp.
Mesa Airlines	YV	ASH	Air Shuttle	Bombardier CRJ900	47	9	70	79	Mesa Air Group
Mesa Airlines	YV	ASH	Air Shuttle	Bombardier CRJ900	47	6	70	76	Mesa Air Group
Piedmont Airlines	PT	PDT	Piedmont	Dash 8-100	30	–	37	37	US Airways Group
Piedmont Airlines	PT	PDT	Piedmont	Dash 8-300	11	–	50	50	US Airways Group
PSA Airlines	OH	JIA	Blue Streak	Bombardier CRJ200	35	–	50	50	US Airways Group
PSA Airlines	OH	JIA	Blue Streak	Bombardier CRJ700	14	9	58	67	US Airways Group
Republic Airways	YX	RPA	Brickyard	Embraer 170	17	9	60	69	Republic Airways Holdings
Republic Airways	YX	RPA	Brickyard	Embraer 175	38	8	72	80	Republic Airways Holdings
SkyWest Airlines	OO	SKW	SkyWest	Bombardier CRJ200	12	–	50	50	SkyWest, Inc.
SkyWest Airlines	OO	SKW	SkyWest	Bombardier CRJ900	4	6	70	76	SkyWest, Inc.
Trans States Airlines	AX	LOF	Waterski	Embraer ERJ 145	1	–	50	50	Trans States Holdings
				Total	310				

=== Historical regional jet fleet ===
The US Airways Express brand, through its various regional and commuter airline partners, operated a variety of twinges aircraft over the years including the following types:

- Bombardier CRJ100

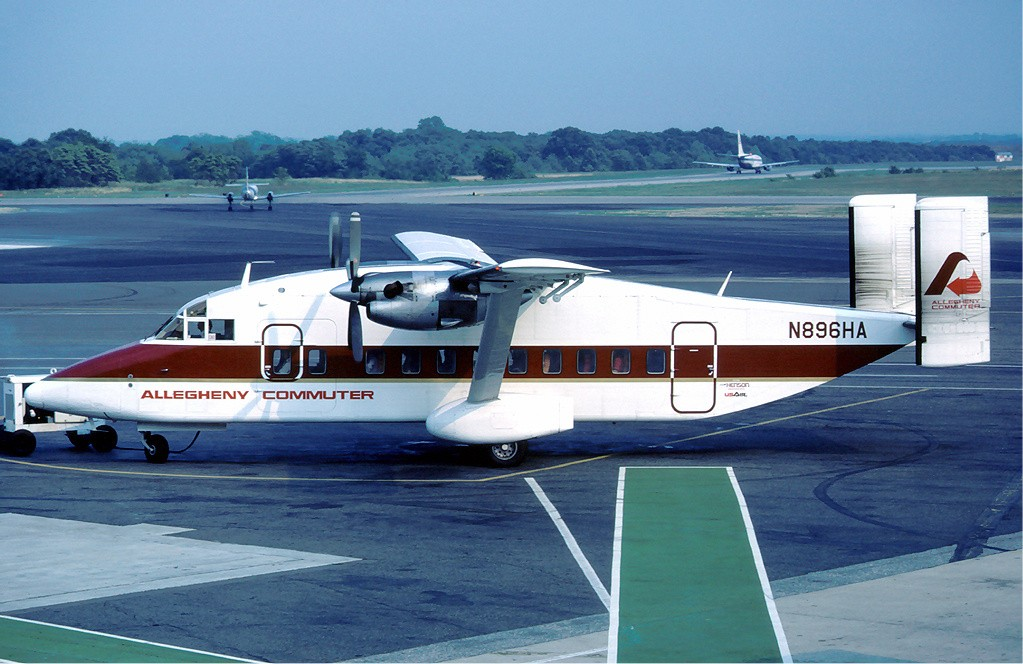
Henson Short 330 at Baltimore/Washington International Airport in September 1983 wearing the Allegheny Commuter livery

=== Historical turboprop fleet ===
The US Airways Express brand, through its various regional and commuter airline partners, operated a variety of twin turboprop aircraft over the years including the following types:

- BAe Jetstream 31
- Beechcraft Model 18
- Beechcraft Model 99
- Beechcraft 1300
- Beechcraft 1900C
- Beechcraft 1900D
- Bombardier Dash 8-200
- Bombardier Q200
- Cessna 402
- de Havilland Canada Dash 7
- Dornier 328
- Embraer EMB 120
- Nord 262
- Saab 340
- Short 330
- Short 360

== Accidents and incidents ==
- January 3, 1992, CommutAir Flight 4281, a Beechcraft 1900C operating for USAir Express, was flying from Plattsburgh to Saranac Lake when it crashed into wooded mountaintop as it was landing at Adirondack Regional Airport. Of the 4 people on board (2 passengers and 2 crew) 2 died while the other 2 sustained serious injuries. The cause of the crash was determined to be pilot error in establishing a stabilized approach and cross-checking instruments.
- January 8, 2003, Air Midwest Flight 5481, a Beechcraft 1900D operated by Air Midwest as US Airways Express under a franchise agreement, crashed into an airport hangar and burst into flames 37 seconds after leaving Charlotte/Douglas International Airport located in Charlotte, North Carolina for Greenville-Spartanburg International Airport in Greer, South Carolina. All 19 passengers and 2 pilots aboard died in the crash. The NTSB concluded that the standard estimates used when calculating the aircraft’s weight were inaccurate. These estimates were subsequently changed. Additionally, improper maintenance that was performed on the aircraft resulted in the crew’s inability to recover from the stall, caused by a dangerous center of gravity resulting from improper weight estimates.
- August 26, 2003, Colgan Air Flight 9446 a positioning flight involving a Beechcraft 1900D, crashed just before take-off at Barnstable Municipal Airport in Massachusetts killing both crew members on board. The NTSB stated that the probable cause of the accident was to do with the pilot not noticing maintenance errors with the aircraft.
- November 16, 2008, Flight 4551, a US Airways Express Dash 8 turboprop operated by Piedmont Airlines, took off from Lehigh Valley International Airport at 8:20am heading to Philadelphia International Airport, had to make an emergency landing. The flight crew was indicated that the front nose gear hadn't come down and had to make a flyover the runway for confirmation. Of 35 passengers and 3 crew, there were no injuries. The aircraft (N326EN) incurred only minor damage and was returned to service shortly thereafter.
- January 1, 2011, US Airways Express Flight 4352, operated by Piedmont Airlines forced an evacuation of the U.S. Capitol and fighter jets were scrambled from Andrews Air Force Base after Flight 4352, operated by a de Havilland Canada Dash 8-100 suffered radio problems on approach to Washington, DC's Washington–National and strayed into restricted airspace. The Capitol was evacuated for approximately 20 minutes until the Dash 8 aircraft landed at Reagan National Airport.
- May 18, 2013, Flight 4560 operated by Piedmont Airlines made a belly landing at Newark Liberty International Airport after landing gear would not extend. All passengers and crew members were evacuated safely.

== See also ==
- List of defunct airlines of the United States
