= CommutAir Flight 4933 =

2019 aviation accident in Maine

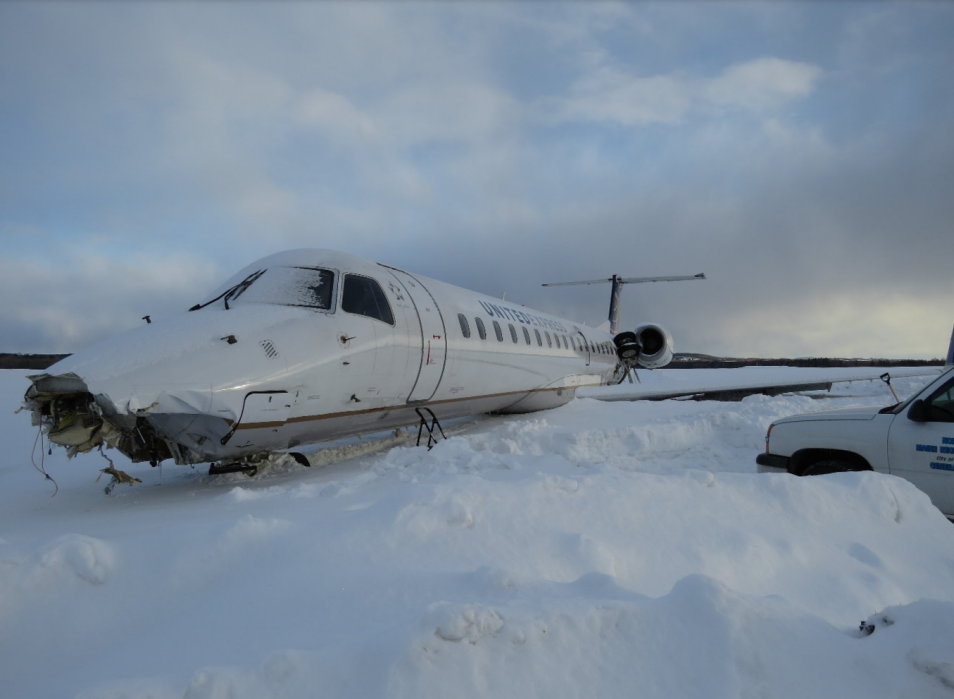
- The damage to the aircraft

Accident
- Date: March 4, 2019
- Summary: Off-runway landing
- Site: Presque Isle International Airport, United States

Aircraft
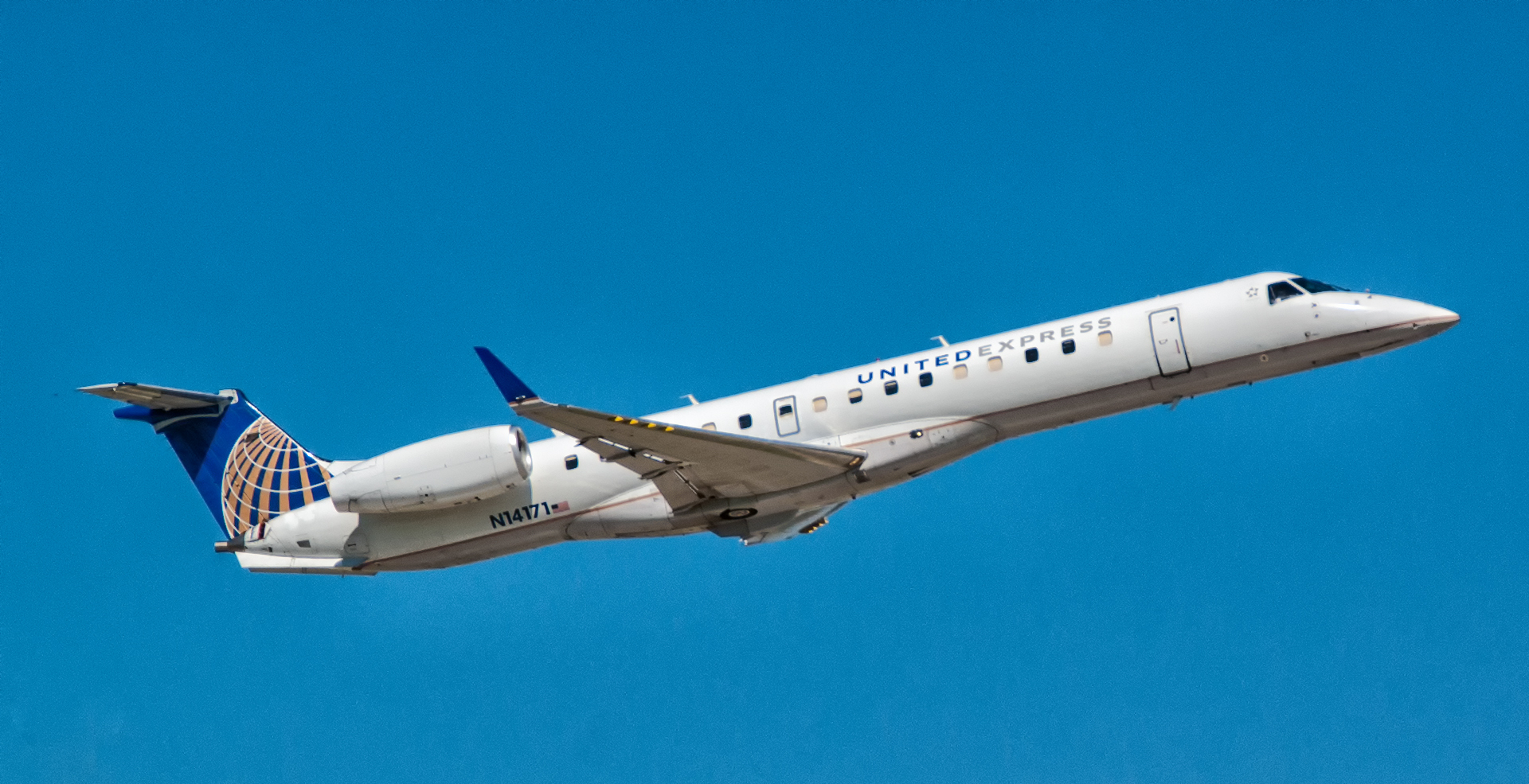
- N14171, the aircraft involved in the accident, seen in 2013
- Aircraft type: Embraer ERJ-145XR
- Operator: CommutAir on behalf of United Express
- IATA flight No.: C54933
- ICAO flight No.: UCA4933
- Call sign: COMMUTEAIR 4933
- Registration: N14171
- Flight origin: Newark Liberty International Airport, United States
- Destination: Presque Isle International Airport, United States
- Occupants: 31
- Passengers: 28
- Crew: 3
- Fatalities: 0
- Injuries: 3
- Survivors: 31

CommutAir Flight 4933 (operating as United Express Flight 4933) was a domestic regional flight operating from Newark, New Jersey, to Presque Isle, Maine, in the United States. The flight was operated by CommutAir under the United Express brand. On March 4, 2019, the Embraer EMB-145XR operating the flight touched down in a snow-covered grassy area to the right of the runway at Presque Isle International Airport, injuring three aircraft occupants and substantially damaging the aircraft. The accident was attributed to confirmation bias which prompted the flight crew to continue descending even though they could not see the runway due to snow; poor decision-making by the captain, fatigue of the first officer, and problems with the airport's instrument landing system were identified as contributing factors.

== Background ==
=== Aircraft ===
The aircraft was a Embraer EMB-145XR and its registration was N14171. Its engine model is Allison AE3007A1 and the MSN is 14500859. It was manufactured in 2004.

=== Crew ===
The aircraft had three crew members (two pilots and a flight attendant). The captain was 40 years old and joined CommutAir in March 2013 before working for another air carrier in November 2015, then returned in May 2016. She had accumulated a total of 5,655 flight hours, 1,044 of them on the Embraer EMB-145XR. The first officer was 51 years old and joined CommutAir in May 2018. He had accumulated a total of 4,909 flight hours, 470 on the Embraer EMB-145XR.

== Accident ==
Flight 4933 departed from Newark Liberty International Airport around 10:04 Eastern Standard Time (EST) (14:04 UTC). The initial part of the flight was uneventful. At 11:01 EST, Boston Air Route Traffic Control Center cleared the flight for an instrument landing system (ILS) approach to runway 1. The first officer was the pilot flying and the captain was the pilot monitoring. Instrument meteorological conditions (IMC) prevailed at the airfield, with low ceilings, fog, and blowing snow. The runway had been plowed about ten minutes earlier. At around 11:10 EST, according to cockpit voice recorder (CVR) transcripts, the pilots were having trouble seeing the runway clearly and attempted to turn on the runway lights by cueing the radio microphone. During the ensuing approach, both pilots said they saw the runway, albeit with difficulty due to snow. The first officer then spotted a tower near the aircraft's position, and realizing that the aircraft was not aligned properly with the runway; he then initiated a missed approach. Airport maintenance staff later reported that the runway lights were not illuminated at the time.

The aircraft ascended from a minimum altitude of 703 ft (214 m) mean sea level (MSL) [169 ft (52 m) above ground level (AGL)] to around 1,000 ft (300 m) MSL. At 11:16 EST, the pilots contacted airport staff (Note: The pilots conversed directly with airport maintenance staff because Presque Isle International Airport did not have a local control tower at the time, and controllers at the Boston Air Route Traffic Control Center lacked the means to actuate airport equipment.) to verify that the runway lights were turned on at maximum brightness; the staff turned on the lights at the brightest setting. The captain told the first officer that she could see the runway lights but "it's really white down there that’s the problem." The first officer commenced a second approach and verified that the aircraft was aligned with the ILS localizer. At 11:28 EST, as the aircraft descended through 200 ft (61 m) AGL, the minimum decision height for the approach, the captain called out "runway in sight twelve o'clock." The first officer stated "I'm staying on the flight director 'cause I don't see it yet", and the captain responded by repeating the phrase "stay in it", followed by "what the [expletive]" and the first officer saying "I don't know what I'm seein'." The aircraft touched down at 11:29 EST and came to rest in a snow-covered grassy area between the runway and a parallel taxiway.

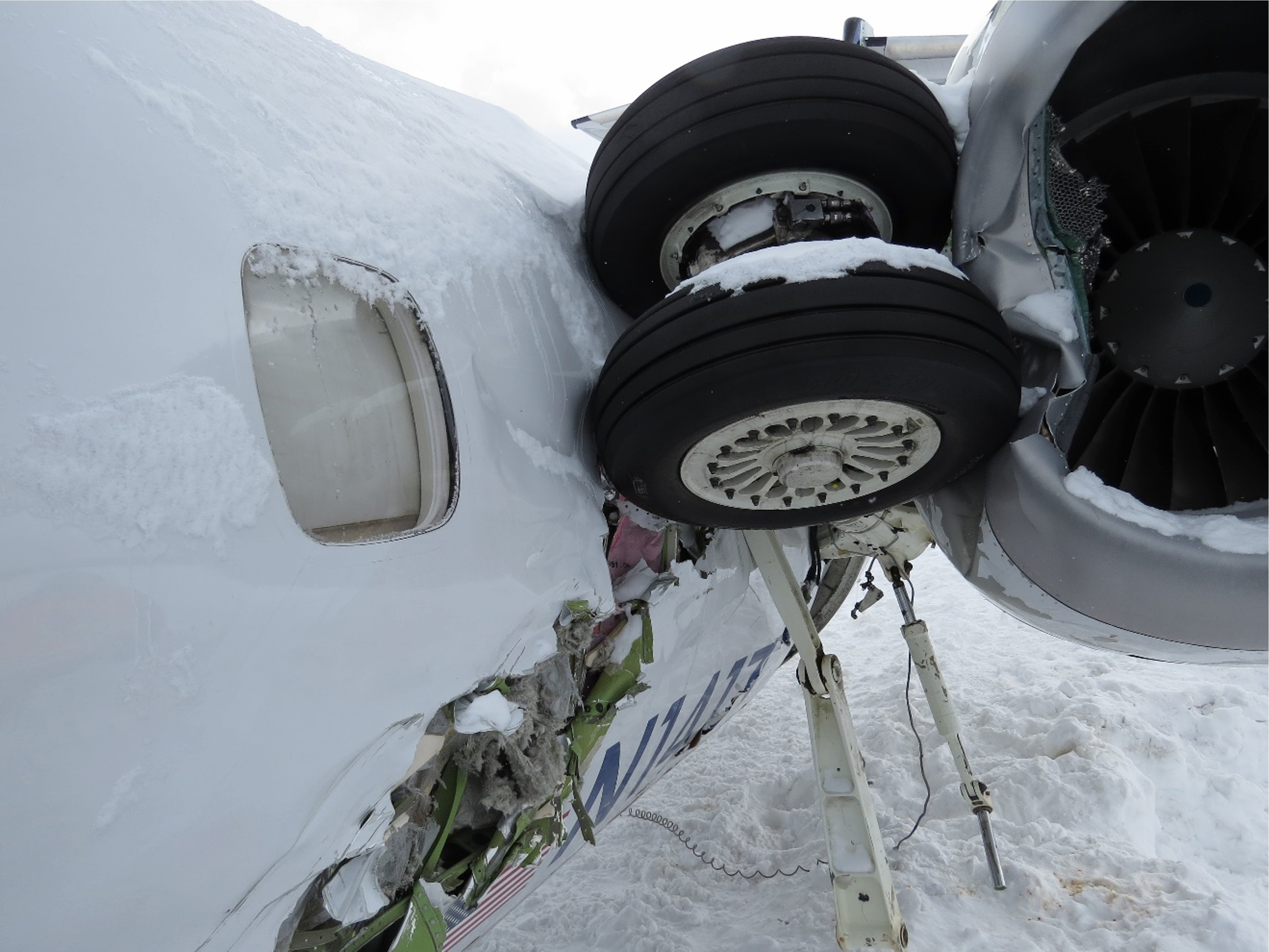
A close-up view of one of the main landing gear lodged into the left engine

CommutAir and the Federal Aviation Administration (FAA) initially reported that the aircraft had touched down on the runway and then slid off, but the National Transportation Safety Board (NTSB) later clarified that the aircraft had missed the runway entirely.

The aircraft was substantially damaged and was subsequently written off as a result. It came to rest with the left main landing gear assembly sheared off and wedged between the rear fuselage and the left engine. Five people were taken to the hospital including the first officer and two passengers who received minor injuries from the accident. The airport was closed temporarily in reaction to the accident.

== Investigation ==
The final report was released by the NTSB on July 12, 2022, more than 3 years after the accident. The NTSB concluded that the probable cause of the accident was confirmation bias which prompted the crew to continue descending even though they had not positively identified the runway. The NTSB also determined that the first officer was fatigued, which contributed to his confirmation bias; that the captain had demonstrated "poor judgment and decision-making" in instructing the first officer to continue the approach although he did not have the runway in sight; and that the ILS localizer was out of tolerance by about 200 ft (61 m) to the right, a condition that had been noticed during six previous CommutAir flights, including by the accident first officer, but had not been properly reported to the FAA.

=== Weather ===
Around the time of the first approach, the Automatic Weather Observation System (AWOS) at the airport was reporting wind from 060° at 4 kn (4.6 mph; 7.4 km/h) and visibility of 0.50 mi (0.80 km) in moderate snow and freezing fog. Fourteen minutes after the accident, visibility had improved to 0.75 mi (1.21 km), with scattered clouds at 800 ft (240 m) AGL, and an overcast ceiling at 1,300 ft (400 m) AGL.

In a post crash interview, the first officer of the flight stated that when he transitioned from looking at his flight instruments to the outside, all he could see was "white on white".

=== Crew ===
The NTSB identified the first officer's lack of sleep as a contributing factor. He had been recently suffering from the flu and had lost sleep, and had made only limited and inconsistent use of his prescribed continuous positive airway pressure machine for several days leading to the accident. He had not gone to sleep until around 1:00 EST the night before the accident due to flight and shuttle delays during the preceding workday, and he had only slept until 6:00 EST, about five hours, whereas he usually slept for about eight hours.

The NTSB commented on the captain's flight training record. While she had been a de Havilland Canada DHC-8 first officer with CommutAir, she had received a disciplinary letter and been subject to nine months of monitoring before being allowed to pursue captain upgrade training. She failed her EMB-145 checkride during her initial attempt and was later placed under "increased scrutiny" by CommutAir twice. Although she had subsequently received her EMB-145 type rating and been upgraded to captain, the NTSB said that "her repeated training problems indicated an inadequate foundation for being a captain, which CommutAir did not effectively address."

=== Localizer ===
About 36 hours before the accident, a CommutAir flight crew had noticed the lateral localizer error and reported it to the Boston Air Route Traffic Control Center; however, FAA procedures dictated that before a navigational aid malfunction could be officially reported, a second independent report of the error was needed, which had not been received. Airport maintenance staff did not have the means to measure localizer alignment directly. Investigators found that the localizer antenna was surrounded by 2–5 ft (0.61–1.52 m) of snow; after confirming the reported localizer misalignment, the snow was cleared, and this caused correct localizer alignment to be restored. FAA guidance before the accident did not specifically address snow depth around a localizer antenna; after the accident, the guidance was revised to state that localizer alignment should be checked if snow accumulated to a depth exceeding 2 ft (0.61 m)

The NTSB found that at least six CommutAir pilots had noticed the localizer misalignment within the preceding five days before the accident but none had filed a company aviation safety action program (ASAP) report; however, four of them filed ASAP reports after the accident. The CommutAir managing director of safety could not state a reason why the reports were not filed earlier.
