= Lake Clear, New York =

Hamlet in New York, United States

Coordinates: 44°22′03″N 74°13′58″W

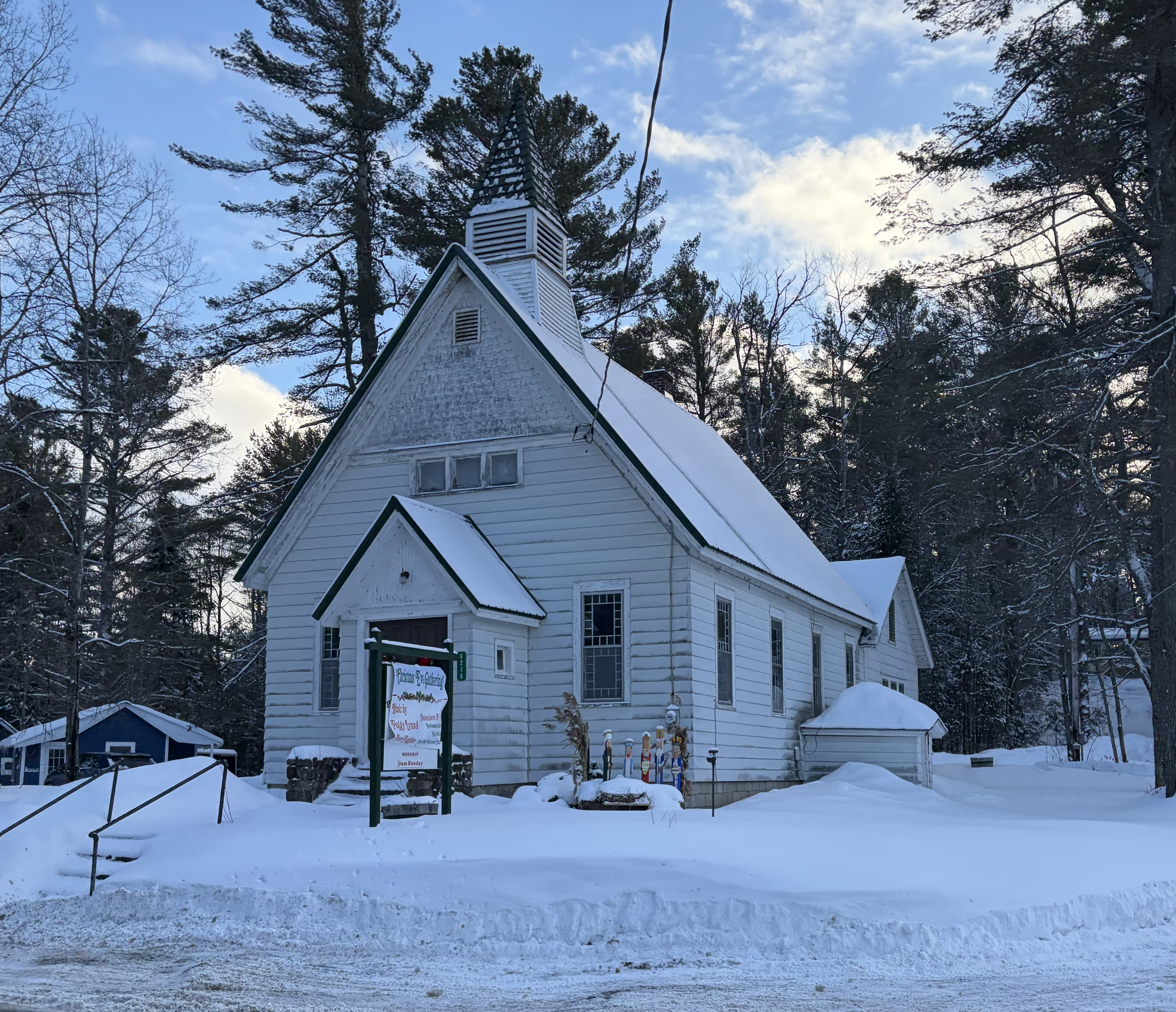
Adirondack Presbyterian Church (PCUSA) in Lake Clear, New York.

Lake Clear is a hamlet and a lake in the town of Harrietstown, Franklin County, New York, United States. The area is named for 940-acre (3.8 km^{2}) Lake Clear, part of the original Seven Carries canoe route. It is located in the town of Harrietstown.

In the late 19th century, Lake Clear was near the center of a thriving tourist industry; Upper Saint Regis Lake, three miles (5 km) to the north, is home to some of the earliest and most elite of the Adirondack Great Camps, and the famous Paul Smith's Hotel was only five miles to the north. Saranac Inn, on the shore of Upper Saranac Lake, is four miles (6 km) to the west, and the village of Saranac Lake is six miles (10 km) to the southeast.

== New York Central and Lake Clear Junction as a passenger train transfer point ==
In 1892, the Mohawk and Malone Railway reached Lake Clear, and in 1906, Paul Smith built an electric railroad that ran from Lake Clear to his hotel. That railway became the Adirondack Division of the New York Central Railroad (NYC) in 1913. Lake Clear was served by New York Central trains from Montreal in the north and New York City to the south. From Lake Clear passengers would transfer to Lake Saranac and Lake Placid to the east.

However, by the post-World World War II years, the default itinerary for trains coming from cities to the west and the south beyond the Adirondacks region involved trips east through Lake Clear to Lake Placid, rather than Montreal or Malone to the north. Scheduled train service by the New York Central north to Malone ended in 1956. On April 24, 1965, the NYC ran its final train on the route. The tracks through Lake Clear were removed in 2021 to enable construction of a new rail-trail between Lake Placid and Tupper Lake, planned for completion in 2024.

== Lake Clear today ==
Today the area is still largely devoted to tourism, but in a much quieter way. Many of the area's great camps and cottages are still in use, along with other guest facilities. The nearby Saint Regis Canoe Area is a major draw for paddlers. The state now owns much of the land, including most of the shoreline of Lake Clear, and it operates a fish hatchery at nearby Little Clear Pond.

The Adirondack Airport is 1.5 miles (2.4 km) northeast of Lake Clear; although it is nominally in Saranac Lake, it is known locally as the "Lake Clear Airport".
