= Adirondack Regional Airport =

Airport in Harrietstown, New York, US

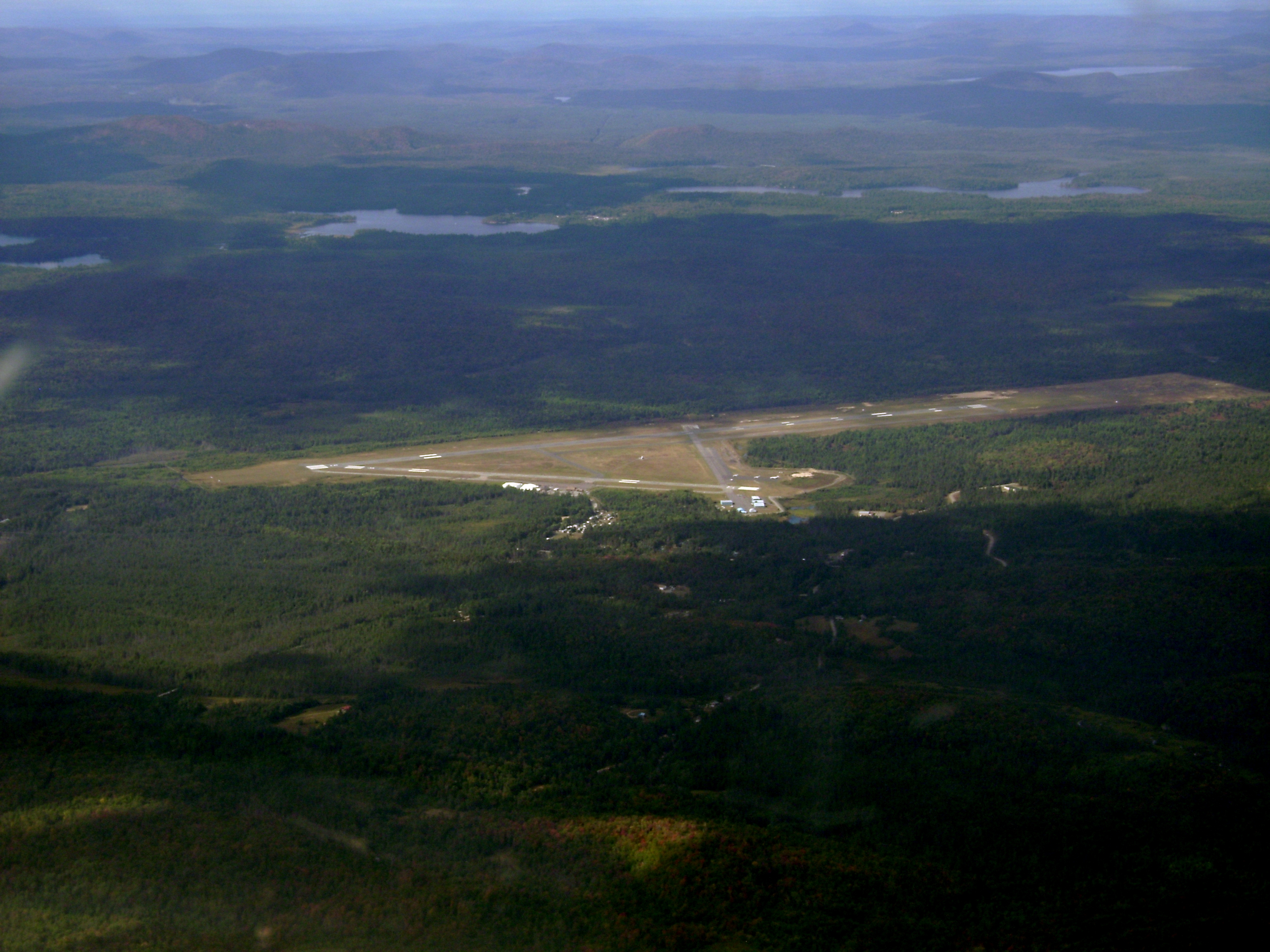
- Aerial view, 2007
- IATA: SLK; ICAO: KSLK; FAA LID: SLK

Summary
- Airport type: Public
- Owner: Town of Harrietstown
- Serves: Northern Adirondacks
- Location: Harrietstown, New York
- Elevation AMSL: 1,663 ft (507 m)
- Coordinates: 44°23′07″N 074°12′22″W
- Website: www.adirondackairport.com

Maps
- FAA airport diagram
- Interactive map of Adirondack Regional Airport

Runways
Direction	Length		Surface
Direction	ft	m	Surface
5/23	6,573	2,003	Asphalt
9/27	3,997	1,218	Asphalt

Statistics (2018)
- Aircraft operations: 6,940
- Based aircraft: 16
- Source: Federal Aviation Administration

Adirondack Regional Airport (IATA: SLK, ICAO: KSLK, FAA LID: SLK) is a public use airport located four nautical miles (5 mi, 7 km) northwest of the central business district of Saranac Lake, in Franklin County, New York, United States. The airport is owned by the Town of Harrietstown and is situated in the north-central Adirondacks two miles (3 km) from Lake Clear. It is served by one commercial airline, subsidized by the Essential Air Service program.

As per Federal Aviation Administration records, the airport had 4,252 passenger boardings (enplanements) in calendar year 2008, 4,809 enplanements in 2009, and 5,762 in 2010. It is included in the National Plan of Integrated Airport Systems for 2011–2015, which categorized it as a non-primary commercial service airport (between 2,500 and 10,000 enplanements per year).

== History ==
In the autumn of 1940, a group of local men from the Saranac Lake Planning board got together to discuss the possibility of an airport in the Adirondack Mountains, near Saranac Lake. Their thinking was that such a development would play an important part in the future development of the Adirondacks. Due to the mountainous nature of the region many thought such a development would not be likely. However, after countless reviews of area maps, a plateau large enough for airport purposes was identified within a few miles of Saranac Lake Village.

The Planning Board's search for an airport site had been prompted by an announcement from Washington, D.C., that Congress had appropriated funds for the building of a system of airports throughout the country. There was, among other problems, however, one restriction. The land for an airport site, to be acceptable to the federal government, had to be publicly owned. The ideal site which these men had spotted on the map was part of the holdings of the Paul Smith's Electric Company. Since no other tract of suitable terrain was to be found within a radius of some 40 miles (64 km), the whole effort might have bogged down but for the public-spirited cooperation of the Paul Smith's Electric Company which, in the interests of regional development, immediately deeded the 1,200-acre (4.9 km^{2}) tract to the Town of Harrietstown without cost.

With the requirement of public ownership thus complied with, events moved swiftly toward the realization of an airport for the Adirondacks. Through persistent effort on the part of various citizens, who maintained close contact with Washington, D.C., the site was inspected and federal expenditures for construction of a Class III airport were approved. Step by step, the Town of Harrietstown Town Board and the Saranac Lake Airport Commission worked closely with state and federal agencies in the building process. Construction of the airfield was completed in 1942. The Town of Harrietstown issued bonds to augment the available funds and erected a terminal building in 1948 and a 100 by 100-foot (30 m) hangar in 1950.

At the time, the airport was rated as one of the best built Class III airports in the country. Two commercial airlines, Colonial Airlines and Resort Airlines, served the region at that time. Airmail service was provided by Colonial Airlines. The volume of air express business handled by Railway Express Agency increased steadily, as did the number of privately owned aircraft using the field. Resort traffic response was immediate and increased steadily.

The airport was officially dedicated to the service of the people of the Adirondacks on July 10, 1949. Since 1960, the Town of Harrietstown has operated the airport. The Saranac Lake Airport was renamed in 1989 to the Adirondack Regional Airport.

Air North provided service to Burlington, Plattsburgh and Albany in the early 1980s. Commutair, a marketing affiliate of US Air, began serving Adirondack Regional Airport in 1991.

In 2000, the Federal Aviation Administration cited Adirondack Regional Airport for several violations, including failure to conduct monthly fire-and-rescue training and triennial full-scale emergency exercises, faded markings on the taxiway, cracked pavement on runways and the taxi-way, and broken lights. During an inspection in 2001, the Federal Aviation Administration found the violations had not been corrected and, as a result, Adirondack Regional Airport surrendered its certificate allowing larger planes to land at the airport. Repairs began in September 2001.

Commutair ended service at Adirondack Regional Airport in October 2007. Commutair had been flying into Adirondack Regional Airport on 19-seat planes, and Commutair decided to replace all of those planes with larger planes that it decided were too large for the airport.

Big Sky Airlines, a partner of Delta Air Lines, began service at the airport when Commutair ended its service. Big Sky Airlines ended its service to the airport in December 2007, and the airline went out of business several months later.

The United States Department of Transportation invited airlines to bid to serve the airport, and Cape Air was the only airline to bid. Cape Air was a partner of JetBlue and Continental Airlines. Cape Air's service at Adirondack Regional Airport began in 2008.

== Facilities and aircraft ==
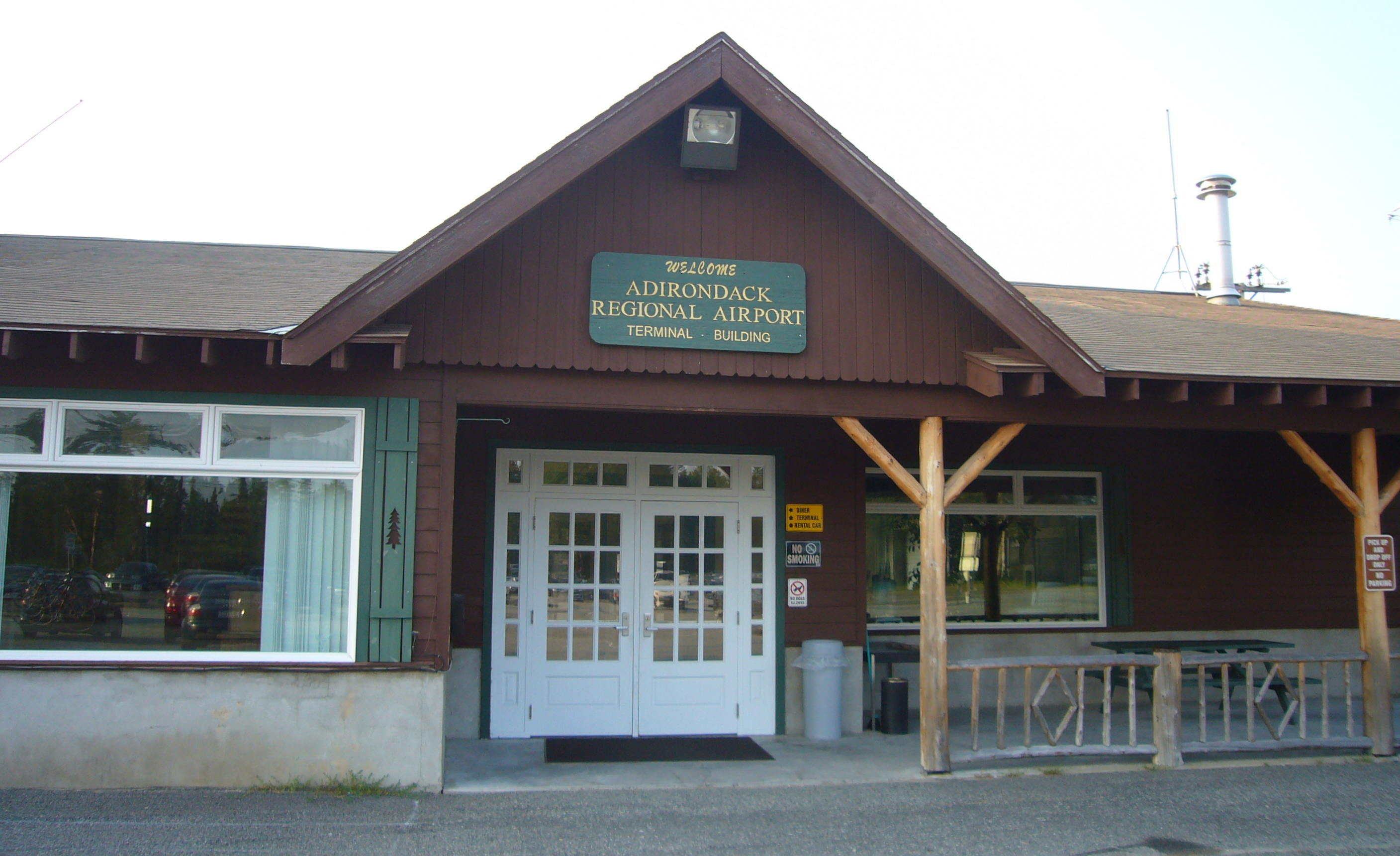
Terminal building

Adirondack Regional Airport covers an area of 1,499 acres (607 ha) at an elevation of 1,663 feet (507 m) above mean sea level. It has two asphalt paved runways: 5/23 is 6,573 by 150 feet (2,003 x 46 m) and 9/27 is 3,997 by 100 feet (1,218 x 30 m).

Originally and through the 1960s, the Adirondack Airport had three runways, all of which were 4000 feet long. Beginning in 1956, the main runway (5/23) was extended to 5000 feet long. Runway 16/34 was 4,000 feet (1,200 m) long and 100 feet (30 m) wide, but was abandoned sometime between the mid-1970s and early 1980s. The main runway was then lengthened from 5,000 feet (1,500 m) to near its present length and widened to 150 feet in 1972 and an instrument landing system and approach lighting system was installed on the southwest-facing runway 23. Also, a parallel taxiway was added to almost the full length of runway 9-27 and a partial parallel taxiway was added between the abandoned northwest–southeast runway - part of which was converted into a taxiway and the approach end of runway 23. Around the mid-2010s, runway 27 had its landing threshold displaced by 400 feet.

For the 12-month period ending May 31, 2018, the airport had 6,940 aircraft operations, an average of 18 per day: 72% general aviation, 27% air taxi, and <1% military. At that time there were 16 aircraft based at this airport: 13 single-engine, 2 multi-engine and 1 helicopter.

== Airline and destinations ==
The following airline offers scheduled passenger service:

Airlines	Destinations
Cape Air	Boston, New York–JFK

Destinations map
All destinations from Adirondack Regional Airport (SLK).

• Red represents year-round destinations.
• Green represents seasonal destinations.

• Blue represents future destinations.

== Climate ==
Climate data for Adirondack Regional Airport (Saranac Lake), New York
Month	Jan	Feb	Mar	Apr	May	Jun	Jul	Aug	Sep	Oct	Nov	Dec	Year
Record high °F (°C)	62 (17)	65 (18)	79 (26)	89 (32)	94 (34)	101 (38)	99 (37)	97 (36)	92 (33)	86 (30)	75 (24)	64 (18)	101 (38)
Mean daily maximum °F (°C)	24.9 (−3.9)	27.6 (−2.4)	36.5 (2.5)	50.3 (10.2)	64.4 (18.0)	72.4 (22.4)	76.6 (24.8)	74.7 (23.7)	67.9 (19.9)	54.3 (12.4)	41.7 (5.4)	30.2 (−1.0)	51.8 (11.0)
Mean daily minimum °F (°C)	2.3 (−16.5)	2.9 (−16.2)	11.6 (−11.3)	26.0 (−3.3)	36.5 (2.5)	46.3 (7.9)	50.7 (10.4)	48.7 (9.3)	41.0 (5.0)	32.3 (0.2)	22.1 (−5.5)	11.2 (−11.6)	27.6 (−2.4)
Record low °F (°C)	−46 (−43)	−44 (−42)	−35 (−37)	−10 (−23)	10 (−12)	22 (−6)	29 (−2)	27 (−3)	15 (−9)	2 (−17)	−21 (−29)	−46 (−43)	−46 (−43)
Average precipitation inches (mm)	2.49 (63)	2.15 (55)	2.44 (62)	2.82 (72)	3.30 (84)	3.81 (97)	3.87 (98)	3.82 (97)	3.78 (96)	3.52 (89)	3.00 (76)	2.75 (70)	38.42 (976)
Average snowfall inches (cm)	25.2 (64)	22.9 (58)	19.6 (50)	9.0 (23)	1.2 (3.0)	0 (0)	—	—	0.1 (0.25)	1.9 (4.8)	14.5 (37)	24.7 (63)	124.8 (317)
Source: ThreadEx - https://www.weather.gov/wrh/Climate?wfo=btv

== Statistics ==
Top domestic destinations at SLK (November 2024 – October 2025)
Rank	City	Passengers	Carrier
1	Boston, Massachusetts	2,970	Cape Air
2	(New York (state)) New York-JFK, New York	1,390	Cape Air

== See also ==
- List of airports in New York

== Other sources ==
- Essential Air Service documents (Docket DOT-OST-2000-8025) from the U.S. Department of Transportation:
  - Order 2006-7-12: reselecting Champlain Enterprises, Inc. d/b/a CommutAir, operating as Continental Connection, to provide subsidized essential air service (EAS) at Plattsburgh and Saranac Lake/Lake Placid, New York, at an annual subsidy rate of $1,706,755 for the two-year period of September 1, 2006, through August 31, 2008.
  - Order 2007-9-13: selecting Big Sky Transportation Co., d/b/a Big Sky Airlines, operating as Delta Connection, to provide subsidized EAS at Plattsburgh and Saranac Lake/Lake Placid, New York, utilizing 19-seat Beech 1900-D aircraft, at an annual subsidy rate of $2,408,294.
  - Order 2008-1-12: selecting Hyannis Air Service, Inc., d/b/a Cape Air, to provide essential air service (EAS) at Plattsburgh and Saranac Lake/Lake Placid, New York, for the two-year period beginning when the carrier starts full EAS at both communities.
  - Order 2010-3-27: selecting Hyannis Air Service, Inc., d/b/a Cape Air, to provide subsidized essential air service (EAS) at Saranac Lake/Lake Placid, New York, for a four-year term beginning March 1, 2010, with 9-seat Cessna 402s, at an annual subsidy rate of $1,366,538.
  - Order 2014-2-19: selecting Hyannis Air Service, Inc., d/b/a Cape Air, to provide subsidized essential air service (EAS) at Saranac Lake/Lake Placid, New York, for a four-year term beginning March 1, 2014, with 9-seat Cessna 402s, at an annual subsidy rate of $1,832,064.
