= Adirondack Architecture =

Architectural style associated with the Adirondack Mountains

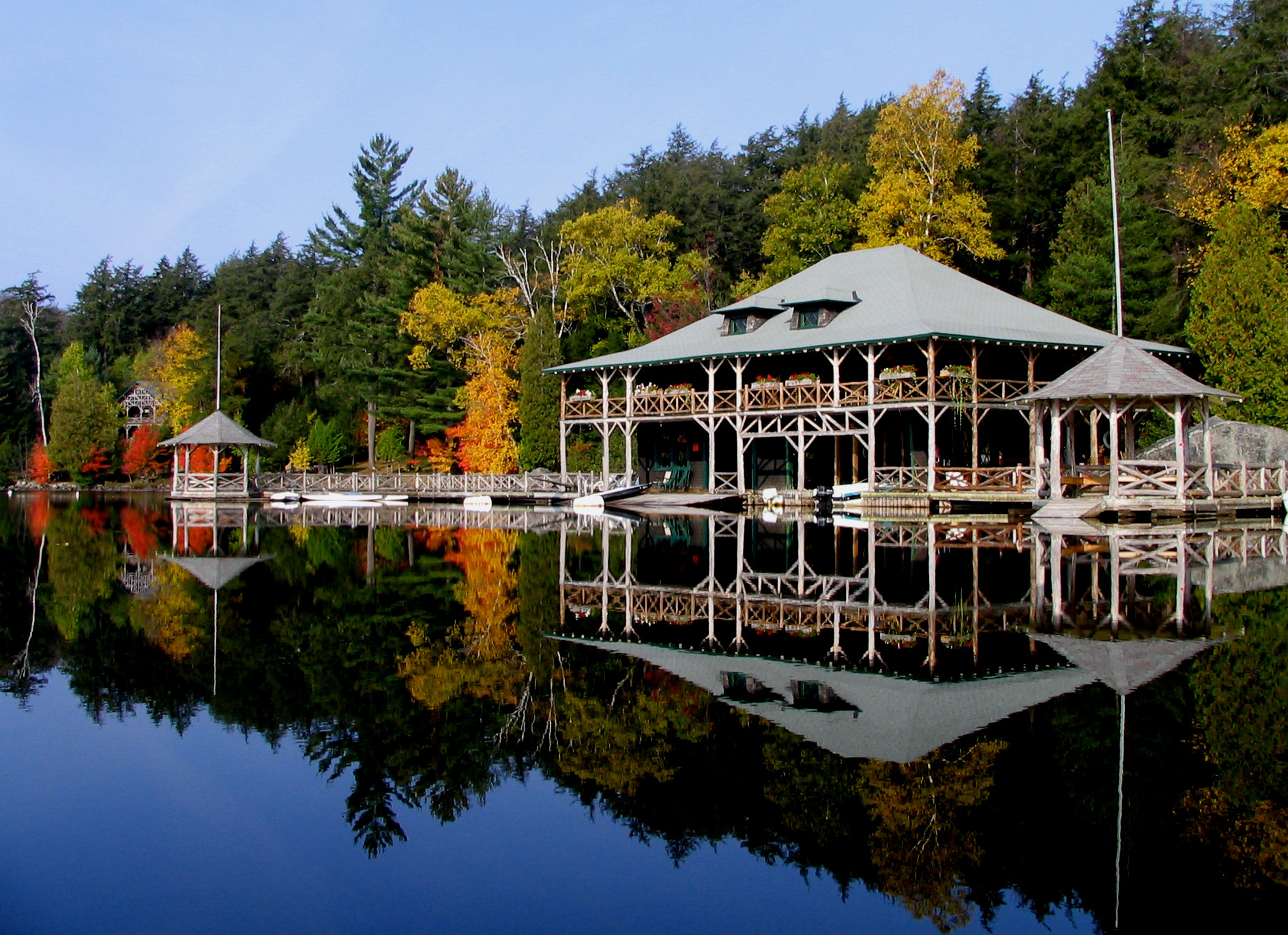
Knollwood Club

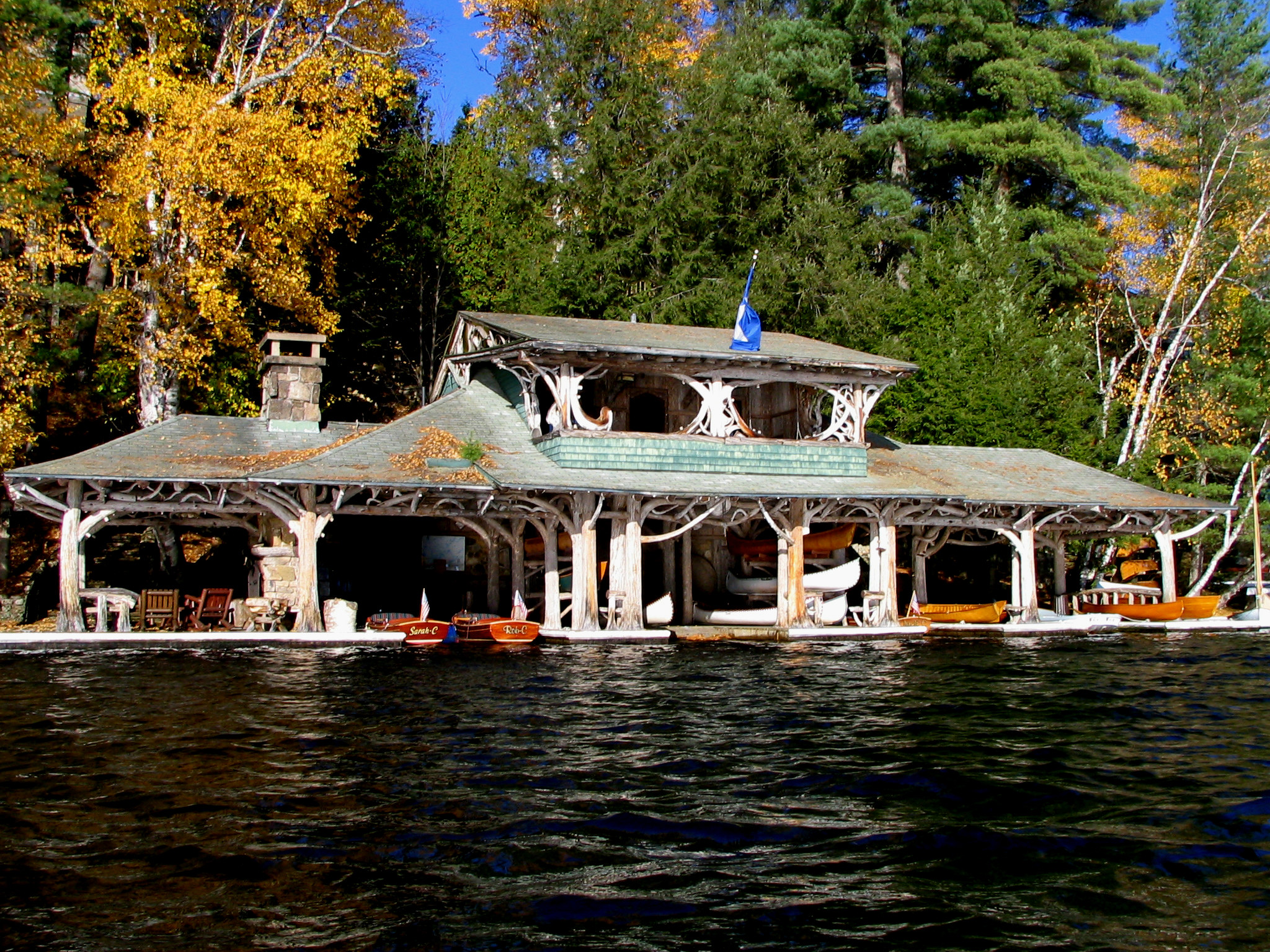
The original boathouse at Camp Topridge, built for Marjorie Post by Benjamin A. Muncil

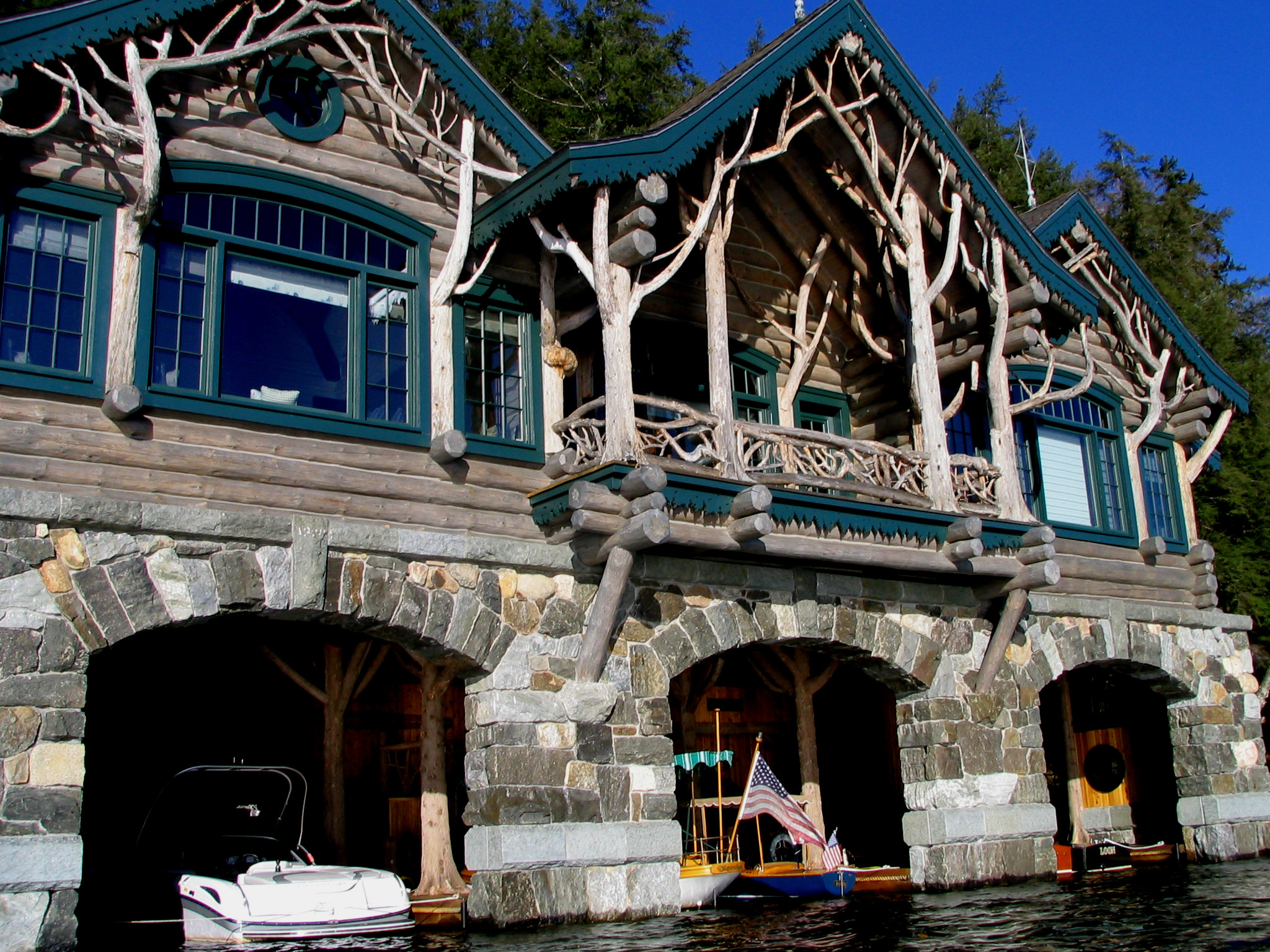
A new boathouse at Camp Topridge, built by Harlan Crow

Adirondack is a rugged architectural style associated with the Great Camps within the Adirondack Mountains area in New York, United States. These camps were built using native building materials and sited within an irregular wooded landscape. Camps for the wealthy were built to provide a primitive, rustic appearance while avoiding the problems of in-shipping materials from elsewhere.

== Elements ==
Elements such as whole, split, or peeled logs, bark, roots, and burls, along with native granite fieldstone, were used to build interior and exterior components. Massive fireplaces and chimneys built of cut stone are also common within the Great Camp architecture. The use of native building materials was not only for promoting a natural appearance, but also to avoid the expense of transporting conventional building materials into a remote location.

== Influences ==
The style drew upon Swiss chalet architecture, which had been introduced to America by Andrew Jackson Downing around 1850. Log construction was popularized by Downing's protégé, Calvert Vaux, in his pattern book Villas and Cottages in 1857. Downing's design principles emphasized utility, structural expression, and conformity to natural surroundings. The building form was influenced by Stick style, but using log framing instead of dimensional lumber to express the structural system of the buildings. Charles Eastlake's book Hints on Household Taste in Furniture, Upholstery and other Details also influenced the Adirondack rustic style. Interior decorations such as rustic and Mission Style furniture, mounted trophies of fish and game, Japanese fans and screens, and American Indian artifacts were influenced by Eastlake's ideas.

Camp Santanoni, Newcomb, New York, built for Robert C. Pruyn of Albany, was the first Adirondack camp to be comprehensively designed as a unit by a professional architect, Robert Henderson Robertson of New York, who designed the Main Camp Complex.

== Adirondack Camps ==
In Adirondack Architecture, many sites, buildings, and lodges are referred to as 'camps'. A camp can refer to any area in which people can find shelter and gather in one location for an extended period of time. The word 'camp' dates back to the early days of Adirondack exploration.

Hunters, homesteaders, explorers, and loggers in the area would establish temporary campsites as a place to meet, rest, and eat. These early camps initially featured temporary, scattered, open-air structures which later on evolved to semi-permanent canvas tents which sat atop a wooden platform. These tents were suited for resting, relaxing, and cooking, and were even heated by fireplaces.

As logging became more predominant in the area, large companies of loggers required larger camps with features such as dormitories, a mess hall, and even stables. The logging camps featured basic log buildings which were meant to last until the area had been logged, then were left to rot. By 1850, New York had become the most heavily logged state in the entire country. The rapid growth of the logging industry demanded larger inns for the loggers to stay at which created demand for logging camps to become more permanent.

The first permanent structures were constructed by Adirondack guides and early settlers using only logs from the area and hand tools. These early log cabins became popular with hunters and explorers in the area, as they would pay the cabin owners for a warm place to stay. Many travelers would come to the area to find a place to get away from everyday life and travel by foot to enjoy a comfortable stay in a simple log cabin, surrounded by nature. Tales of these Adirondack getaways started being published in books which became very popular with the general public. Demand for these permanent structures increased as more people migrated to the area, and soon, log camps featuring multiple buildings all in one area had been established and were known as 'commercial camps'.

By the 1890s commercial camps had grown so popular that some featured three-story hotel style buildings. Despite major growth, these sites were still referred to as 'camps' as they offered a rustic, outdoor experience unlike other resort hotels. Eventually, wealthy visitors purchased large lots of land and established private 'family camps' featuring a large central building or lodge called the 'main camp' which would often be surrounded by up to a dozen smaller, separate buildings used for sleeping, dining, laundry, cooking, etc. By the beginning of the 1900s, development of roads, railroads, and advanced building methods made it affordable for middle class families to purchase land and build a camp in the Adirondacks. As development in the Adirondacks continued, many of the new structures built were not entire compounds, but single structures for a single family, however the term 'camp' is still used to describe all buildings of this style in the region. Most camps to this day are still constructed of natural materials such as wood and stone, and have a predominant focus on the wild nature of the early exploration days of the Adirondacks.

== Style ==
The Adirondacks buildings were recognized for their rugged finish and outstanding craftsmanship especially by the wealthy locals. The Adirondacks style of architecture can be specialized into custom homes, rugged roofing, log cabins, boat houses, rustic furnishing, rustic kitchen, birch and cedar furniture, log and twig works.

This style of architecture is found most prominently in and around the area of Adirondack Park.

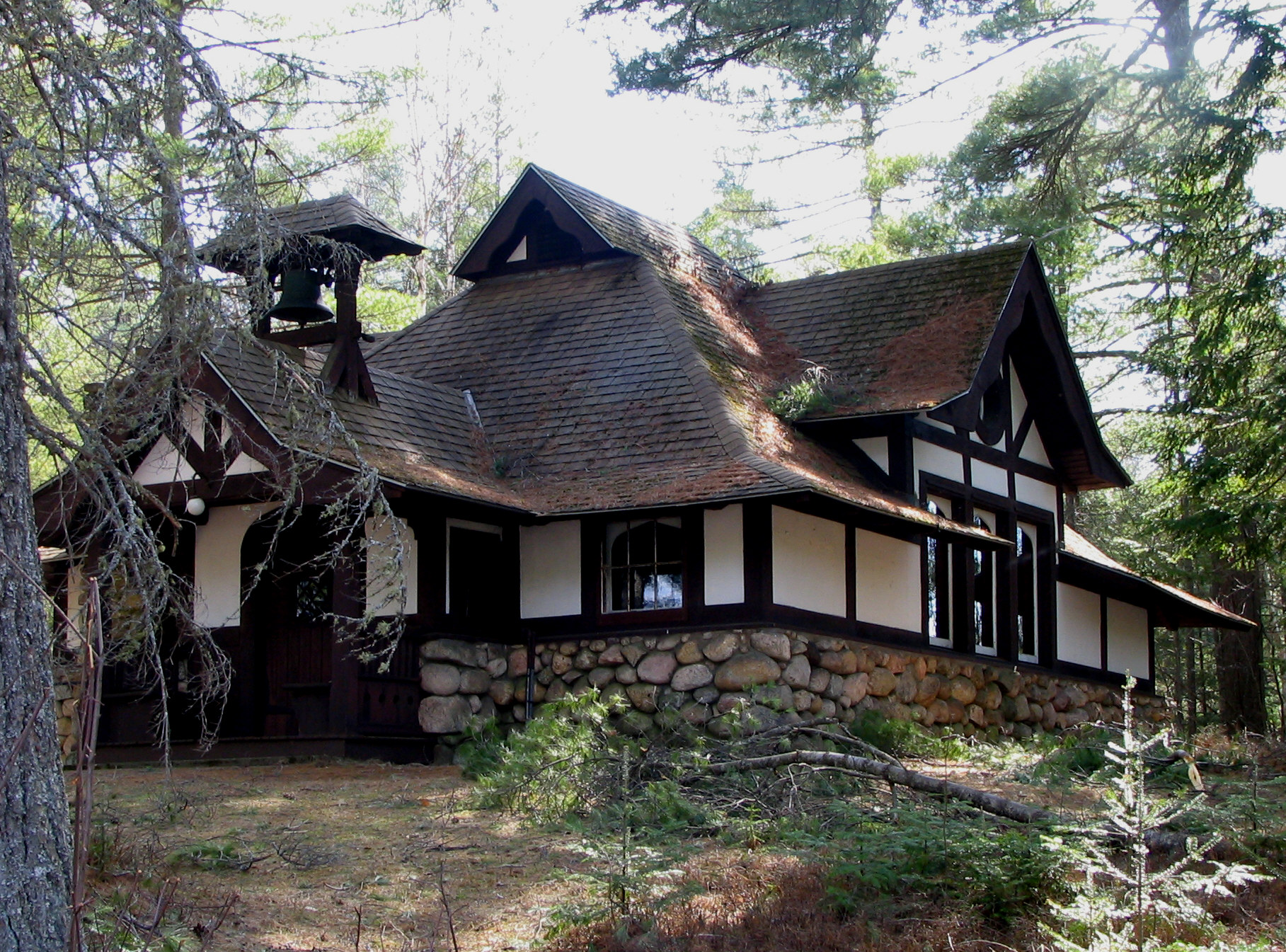
Saint Regis Presbyterian Church, designed by William L. Coulter

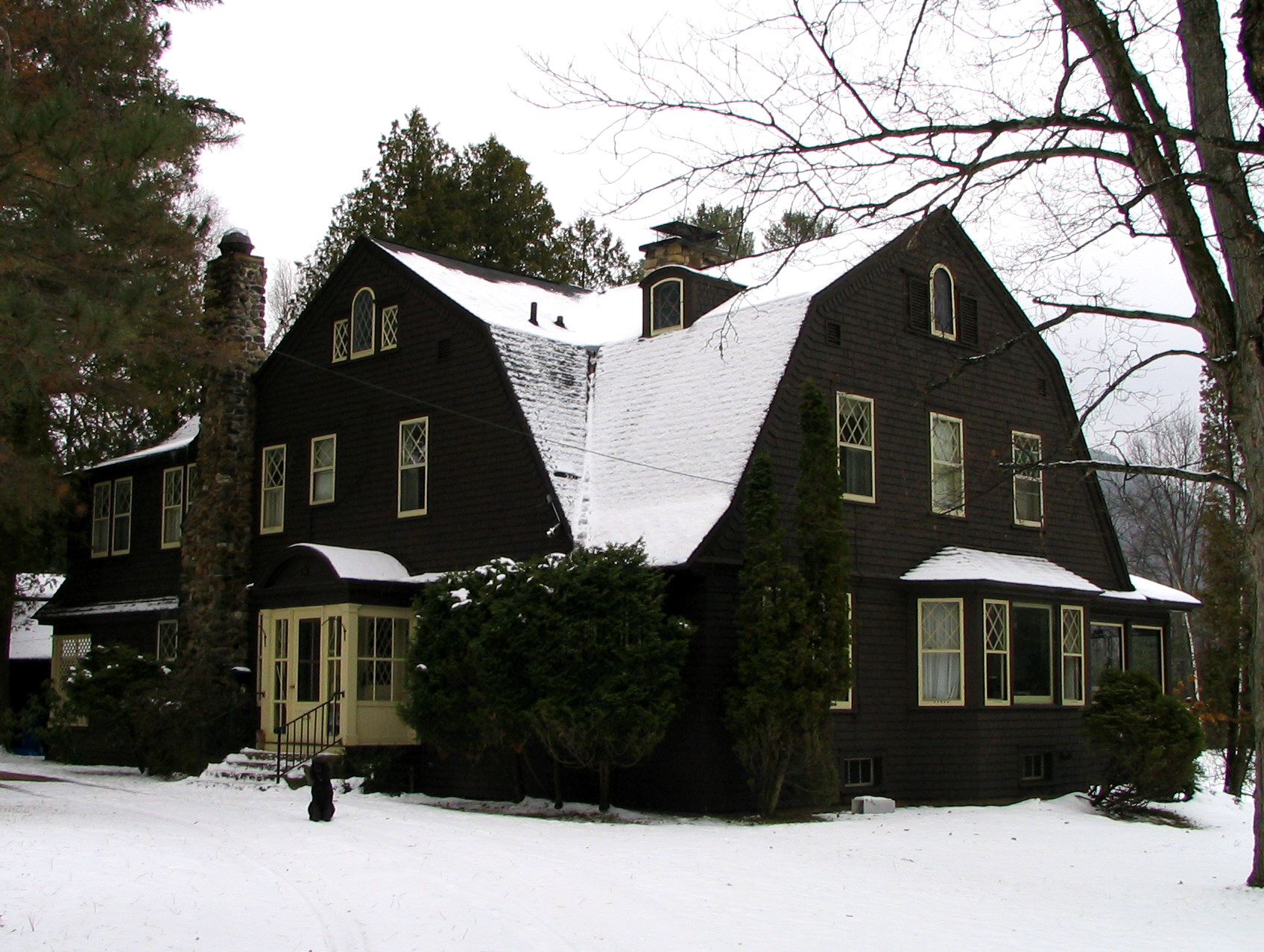
The Jordan Cottage, Saranac Lake

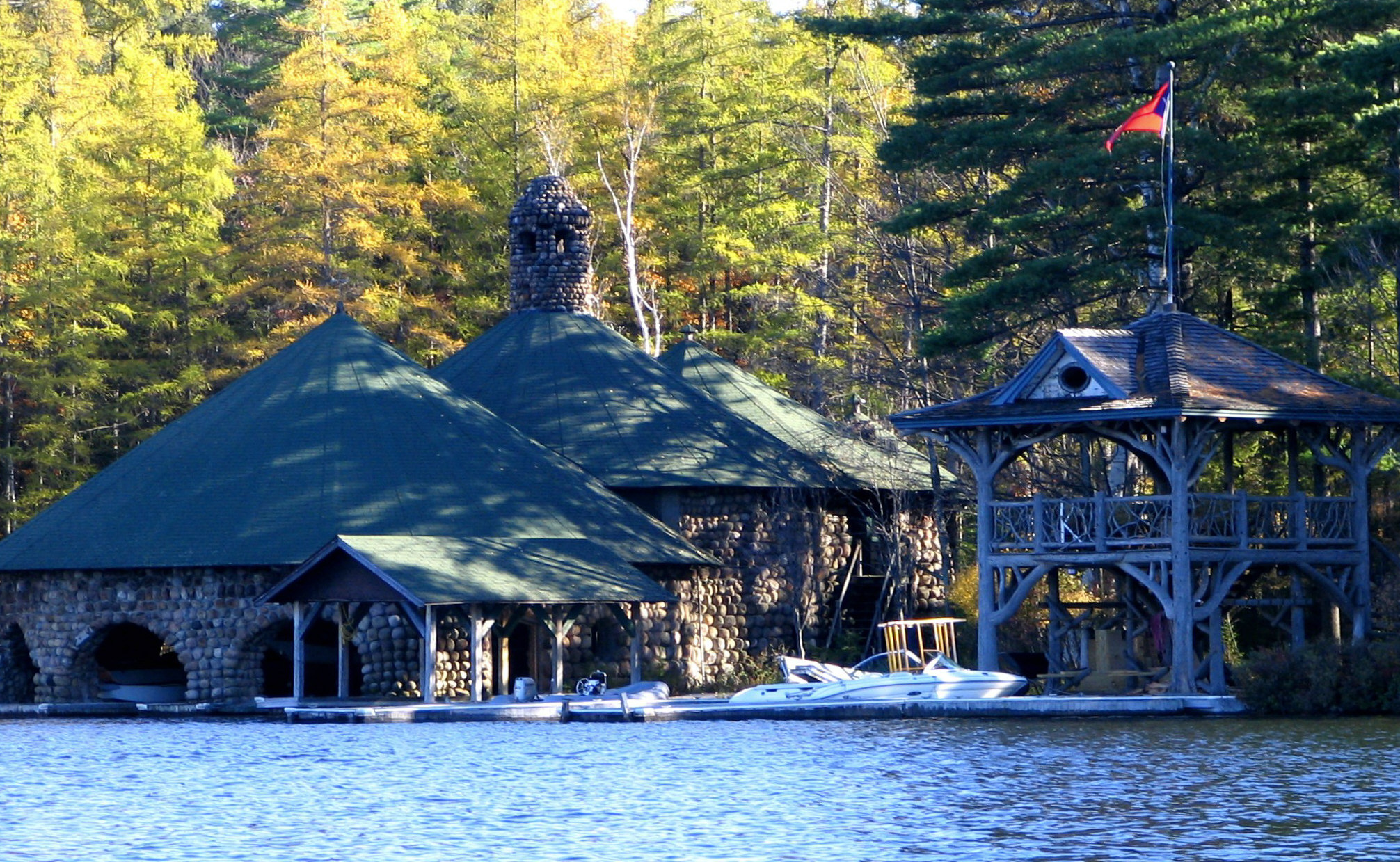
Camp Katia on Upper St. Regis Lake

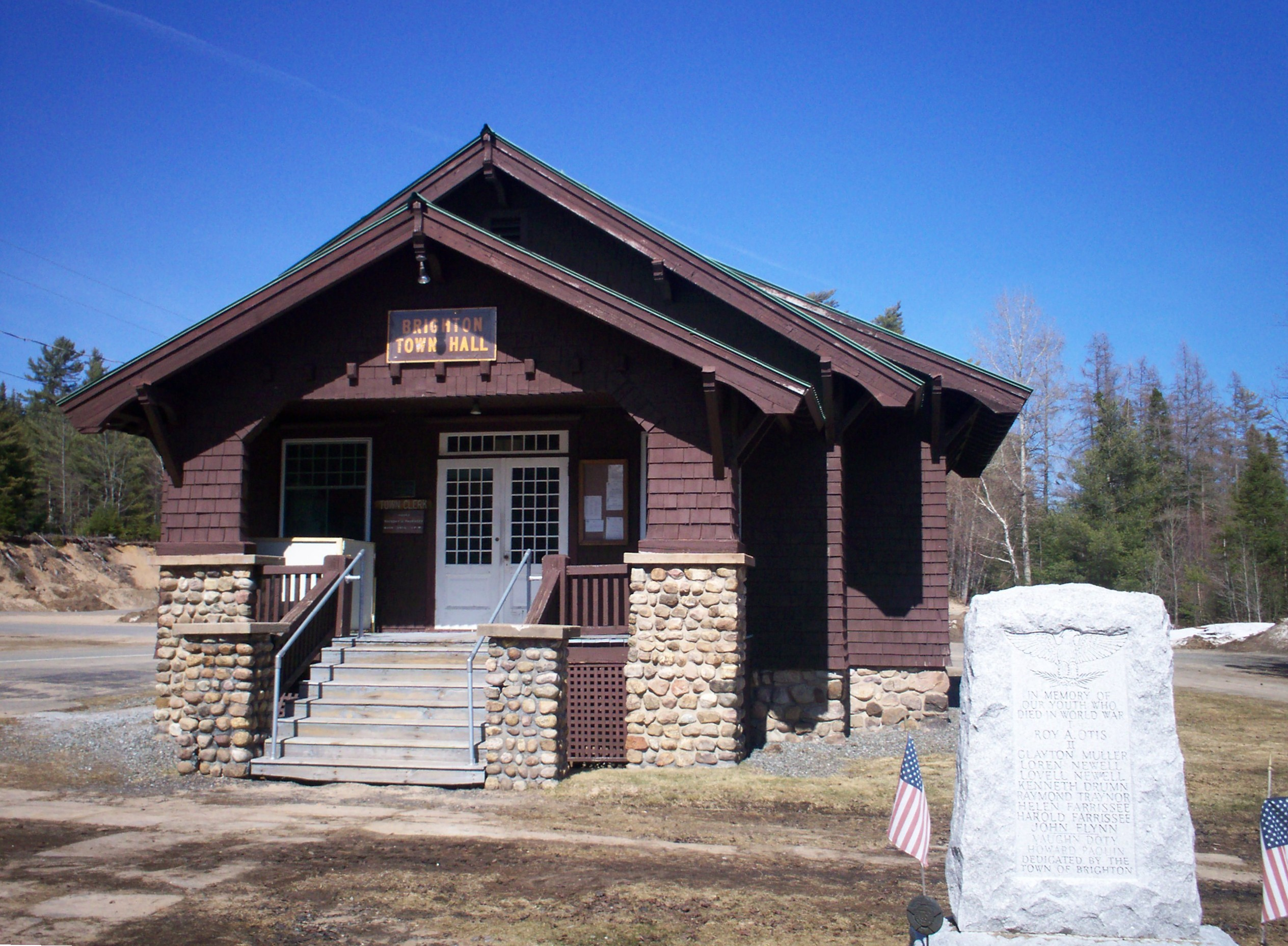
Brighton Town Hall, by Benjamin A. Muncil, 1914

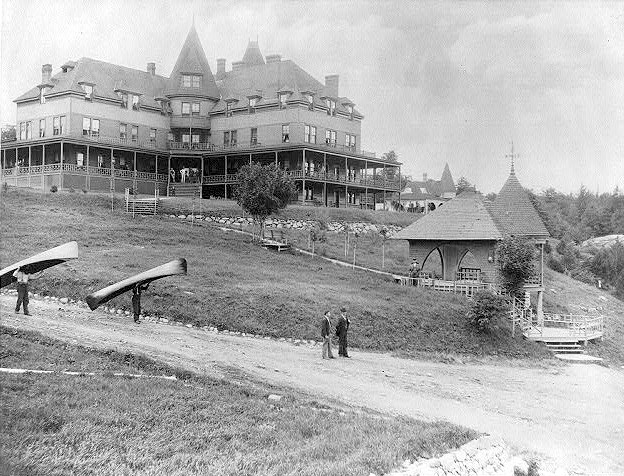
Hotel Wawbeek, Upper Saranac Lake (1890, Stoddard)

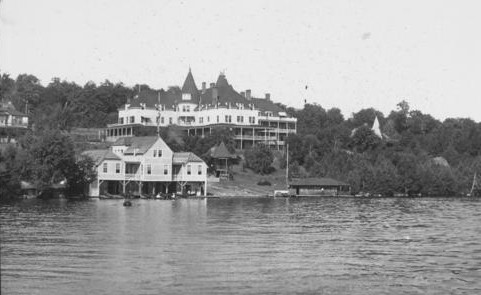
Wawbeek Lodge, 1900

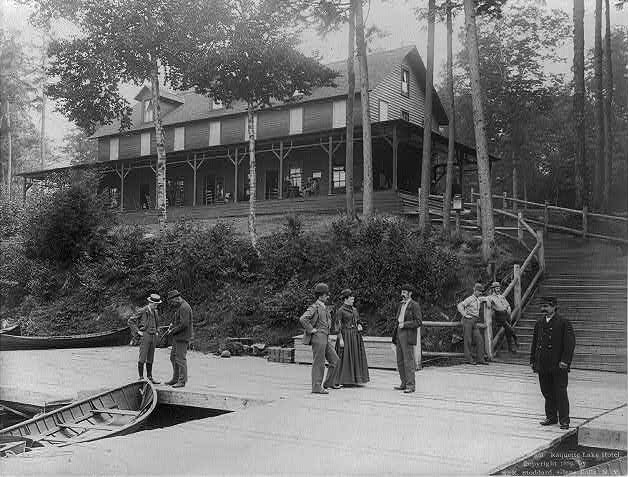
Raquette Lake Hotel, (1889, Stoddard)

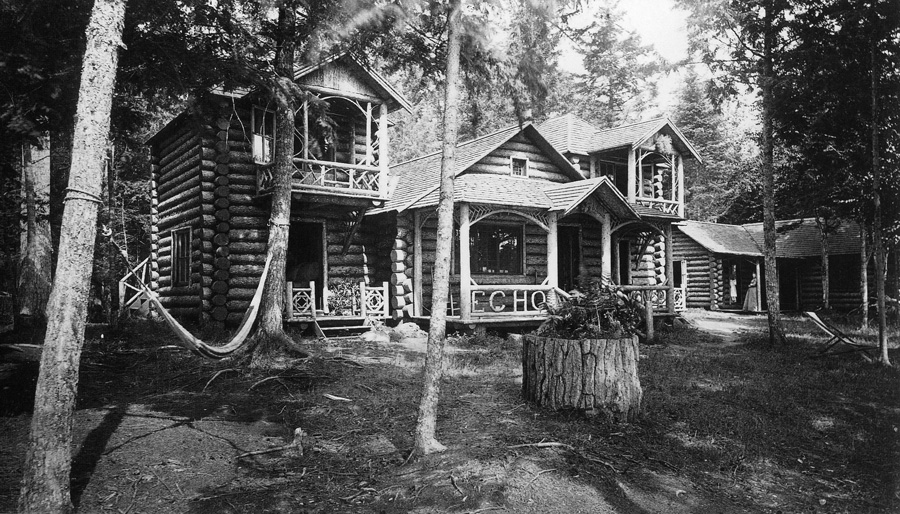
Echo Camp, Upper Saranac Lake (1916, Stoddard)

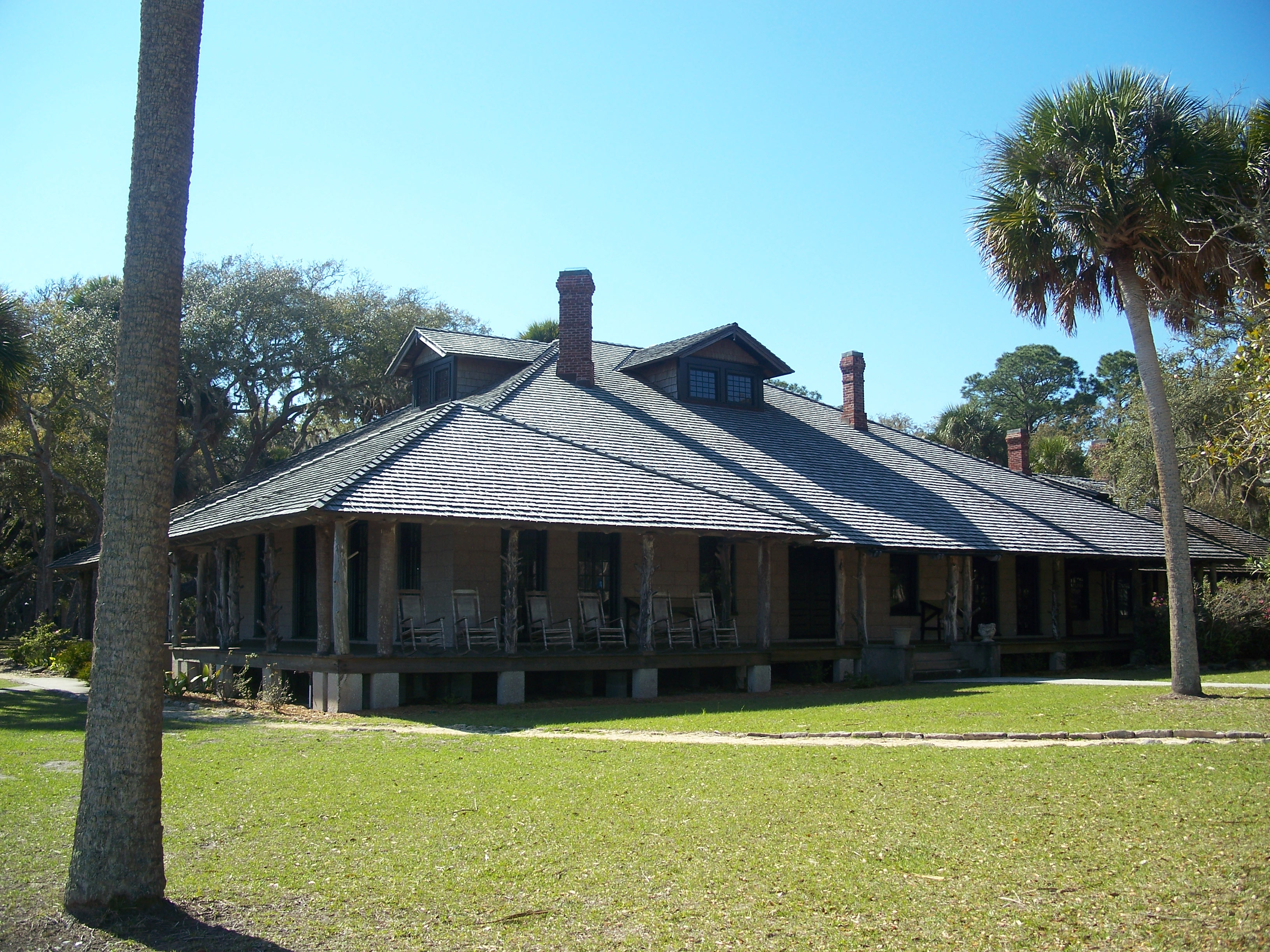
Cherokee Grove, near Bunnell, Florida

== See also ==
- Vernacular architecture
- Great Camps
- Sagamore Camp
- Santanoni Preserve
- Adirondack Park
