= Rabbits Foot Lodge =

Historic house in Arkansas, United States

- Rabbit Foot Lodge
- U.S. National Register of Historic Places
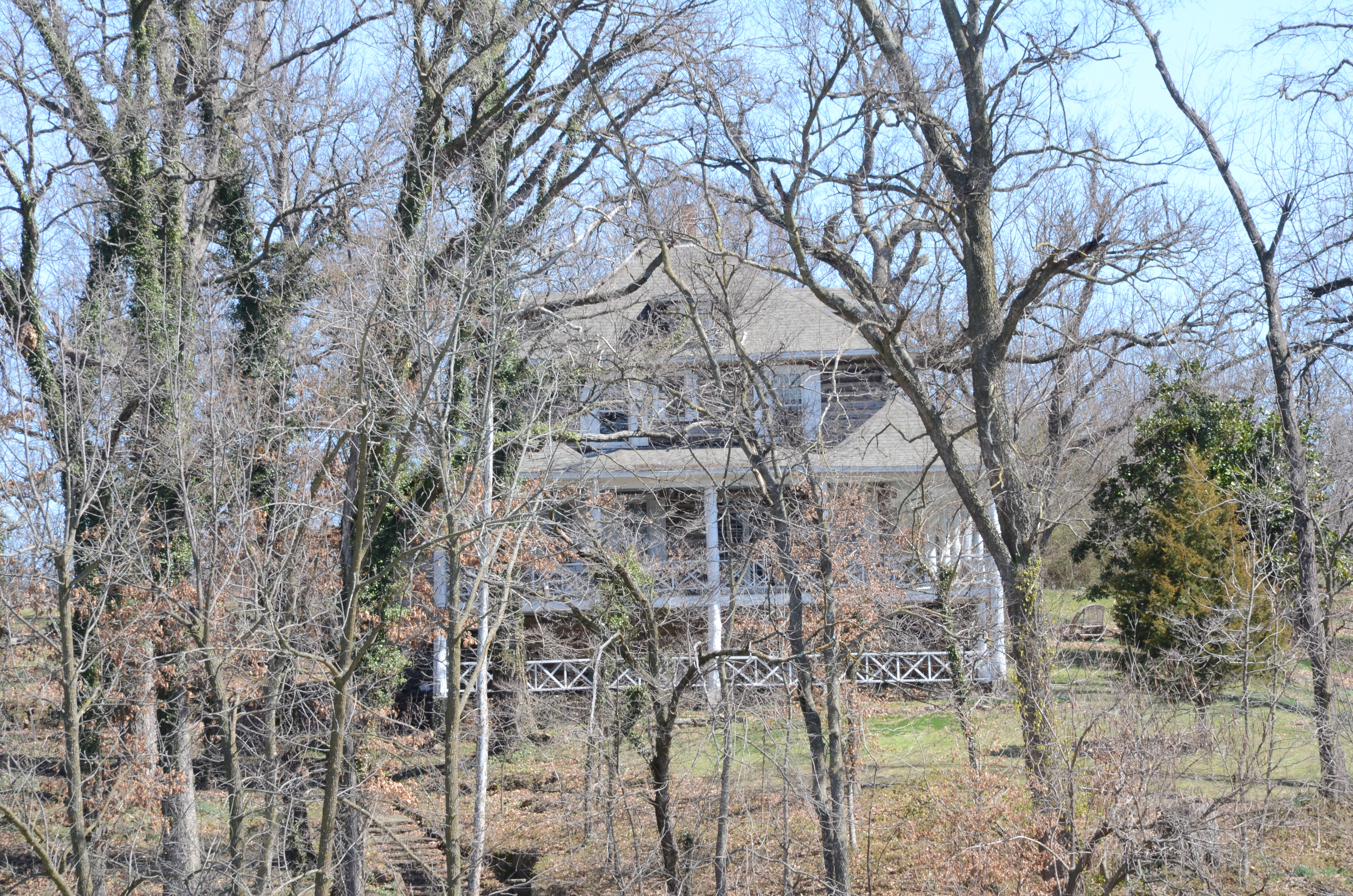

- Location within Arkansas Location within the United States
- Location: 3600 Silent Grove Rd., Springdale, Arkansas
- Coordinates: 36.20975°N 94.15876°W
- Area: 24.4 acres (9.9 ha)
- Built: 1908
- Architectural style: Adirondack
- NRHP reference No.: 86002421
- Added to NRHP: September 11, 1986

Rabbit Foot Lodge is a historic house at 3600 Silent Grove Road in Springdale, Arkansas. Sited on 100 acres (40 ha) northwest of downtown Springdale, it is a large two-story log structure, fashioned from materials gathered on the property in 1908. A distinctive combination of Ozark and Adirondack styling, it architecturally resembles an American Foursquare house, with a distinctive roofline that includes pyramidal elements with flared eaves. The exterior walls, as well as major interior walls, are fashioned from logs that were squared to about 6 by 8 inches (15 cm × 20 cm). Exterior walls were joined with large spikes, while the interior walls were joined to the exterior ones with mortise and tenon joints. When the house was built it received immediate notice in architectural and popular circles. It was owned for a time by Arkansas politician J. William Fulbright.

The house (along with about 24 acres (9.7 ha) of surrounding land) was listed on the National Register of Historic Places in 1986.

== See also ==
- National Register of Historic Places listings in Washington County, Arkansas
