= White Pine Camp =

Coordinates: 44°27′28″N 74°13′44″W

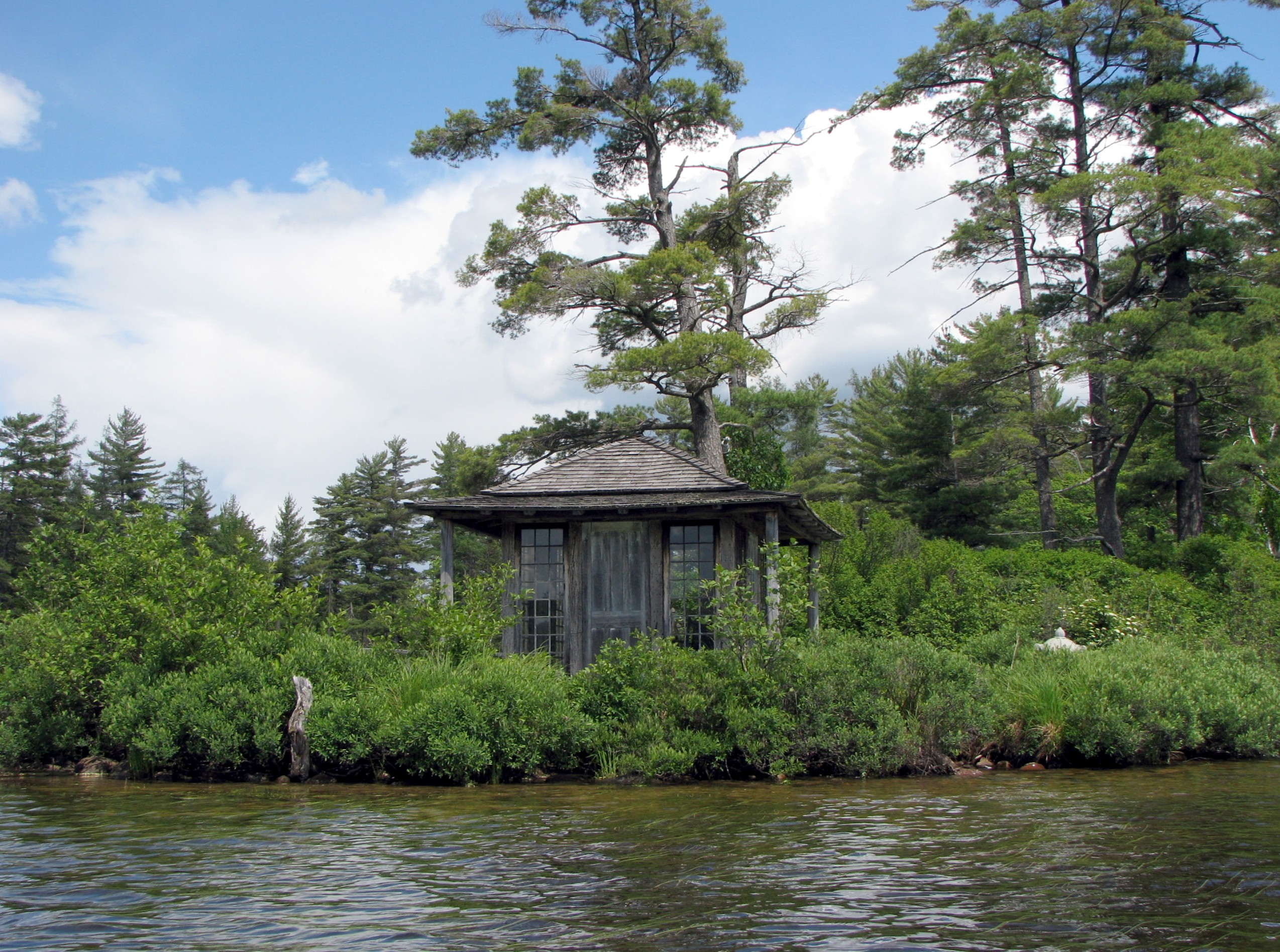
The Japanese Tea House

White Pine Camp is an Adirondack Great Camp on Osgood Pond in Paul Smiths, New York. It served as the Summer White House for US President Calvin Coolidge from July 7 through September 18, 1926.

The camp, built on 35 acres (140,000 m^{2}) for New York businessman Archibald White in 1907, consists of 20 buildings, including the owner's cabin, a dining hall, four sleeping cabins, two boathouses, an indoor tennis house and bowling alleys, and a Japanese teahouse.

The camp was designed by architects William Massarene and Addison Mizner and built by Ben Muncil.

The camp was later owned by Adele Levy and Edith Stern, daughters of Julius Rosenwald, the chairman of Sears-Roebuck; they donated it to Paul Smiths College, which used it for student housing for the next 35 years. The current owners operate the camp as a museum and guest cottage.

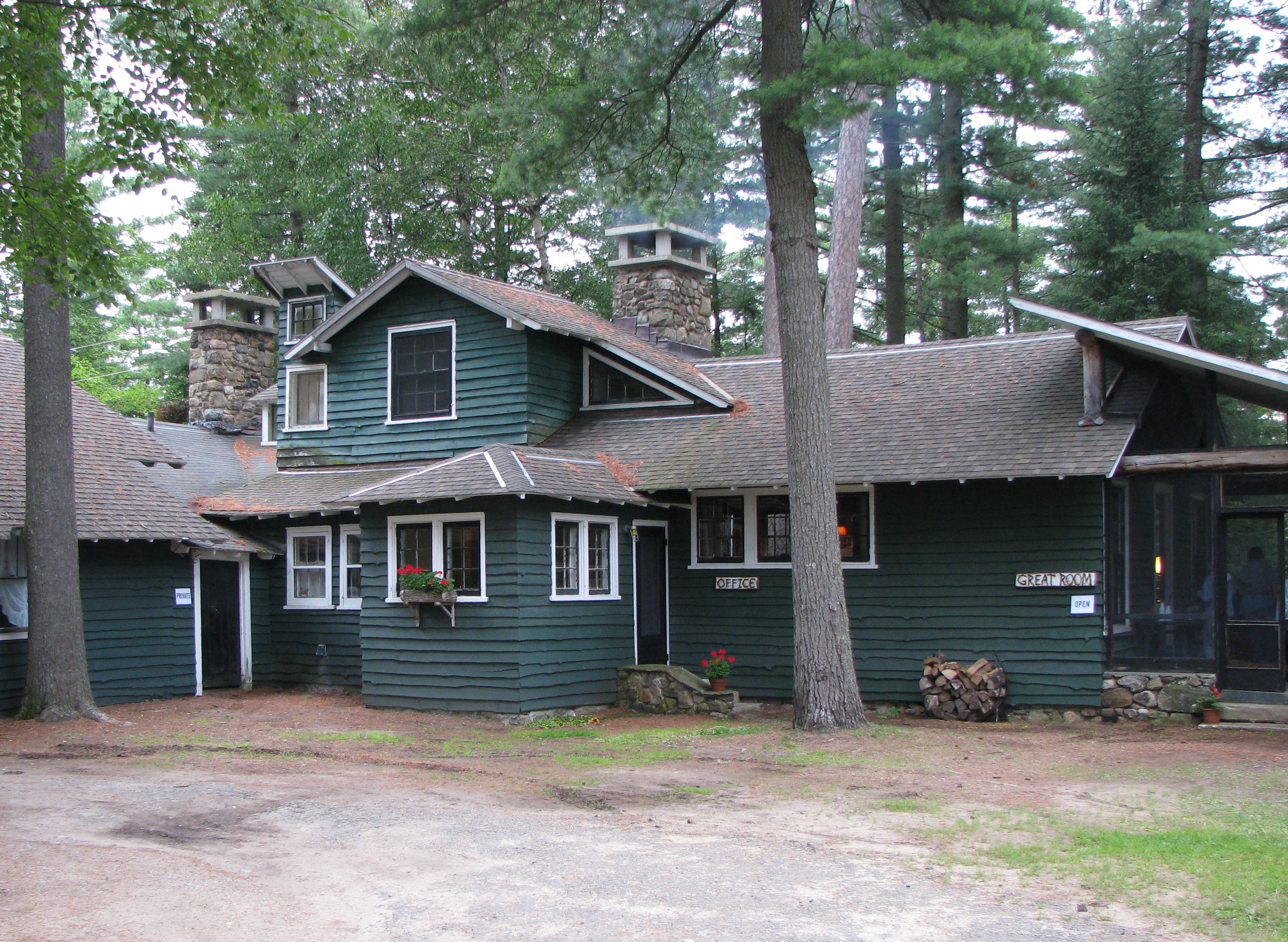
The "Great Room" or dining room and kitchen building (1907–08)

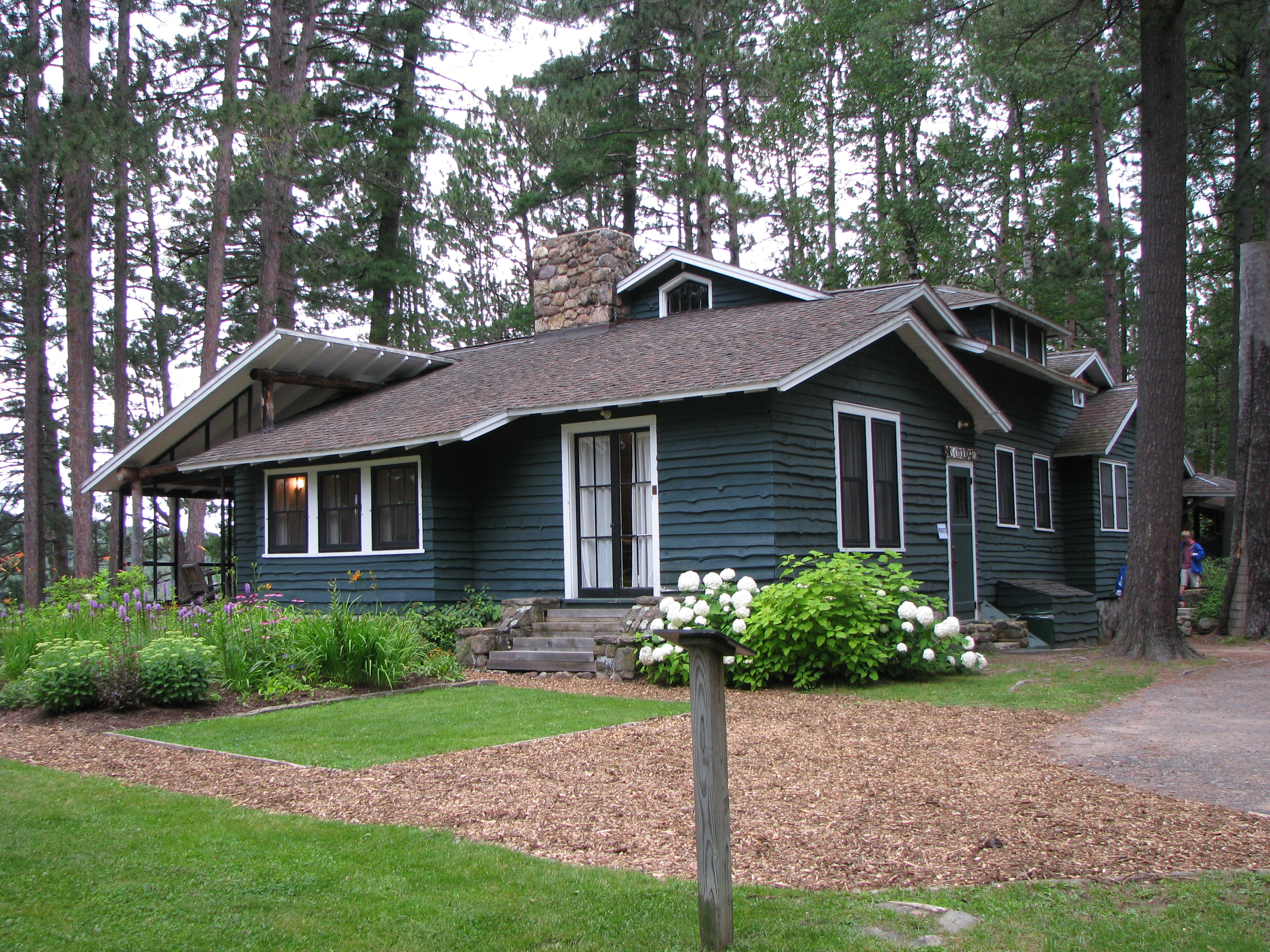
The Owners Cottage - Occupied by President and Mrs. Coolidge in 1926

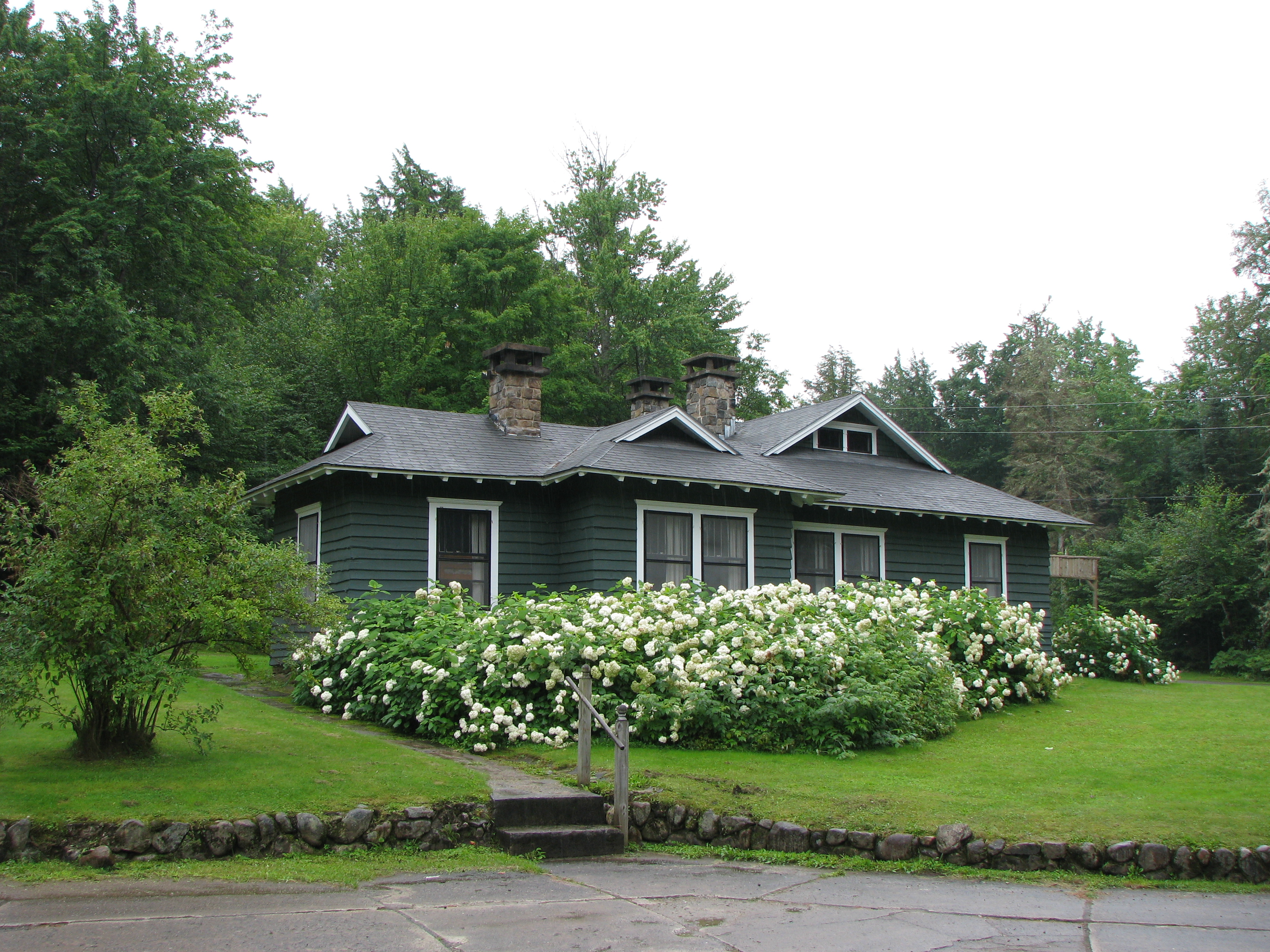
The Gate House, built about 1916

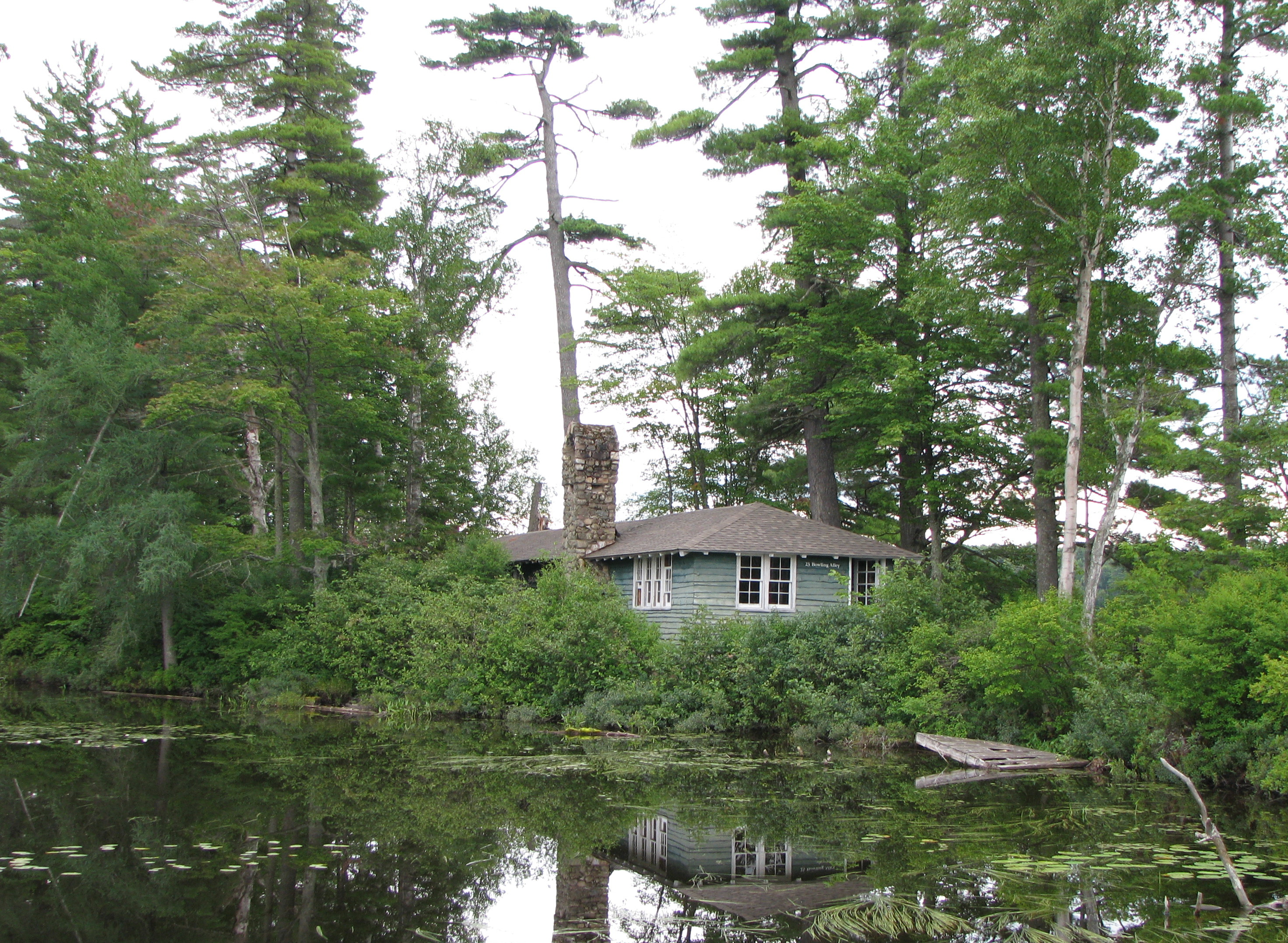
The Bowling Alley (built 1911)

== See also ==
- List of residences of presidents of the United States
