= Edith Rosenwald Stern =

American philanthropist and social reformer (1895–1980)

Edith R. Stern
- Born: Edith Rosenwald; May 31, 1895; Chicago, Illinois, US
- Died: September 11, 1980 (aged 85); New Orleans, Louisiana, US
- Resting place: Metairie Cemetery
- Other name: Edith Sulzberger
- Known for: Philanthropy
- Spouses: Edgar B. Stern Sr; Germon F. Sulzberger (divorced)
- Children: 3

Edith Rosenwald Stern (1895–1980) was an American philanthropist and champion of educational causes in New Orleans, Louisiana, United States. She was instrumental in formation of the Stern Family Fund and was recognized as being willing to support causes for which she had conviction even if the causes were controversial at the time. Examples of her philanthropy included supporting voter registration of African-Americans in the American South, the anti-nuclear movement, public-interest law firms, organizing union and tenant groups, and initiation of challenges by shareholders who wanted corporations to become more socially responsible. Additionally, as political causes, Stern stood for anti-corruption, political fairness at the voting polls, and higher education for African-Americans. She was a patron of the arts including for the New Orleans Philharmonic Orchestra and for promising young artists, especially musicians.

== Personal life ==
=== Early life and education ===
Stern was born Edith Rosenwald in Chicago, Illinois, on May 31, 1895, as the third of five children of parents Julius Rosenwald and Augusta Nusbaum Rosenwald. Her family was wealthy, Julius Rosenwald being part-owner and president of the Sears, Roebuck and Company. She grew up with her family in the affluent Kenwood neighborhood of Chicago. As a child, she was known to her family and close friends as Ede.

Starting in early childhood, Stern's parents instilled in her a strong sense of charity, commitment to the social and economic well-being of society, and noblesse oblige. Through childhood, her family annually visited Tuskegee, Alabama, because her father had admiration for Tuskegee resident and scholar Booker T. Washington, who was a prominent African-American. The Rosenwald family and Washington frequently visited each other's homes, and Julius Rosenwald was a benefactor of Washington and the Tuskegee Institute.

Stern's early education was at the Chicago University Elementary School. Subsequently, through coercion by her parents, Stern as a teenager attended a finishing school in Dresden, Germany, where she completed her education.

At age 18, Stern married Germon F. Sulzberger, whom she met through a mutual friend. The couple made their home in New York City. They separated a year later and divorced in May 1921. She was known as Edith Sulzberger during the time that they were married and until her second marriage.

Stern met her future husband Edgar B. Stern through a mutual friend. During their courtship, the couple visited Longue Vue, an old inn that overlooked the Hudson River. This inn became the inspiration for two of her future homes in New Orleans, Louisiana. The couple was married on June 29, 1921, aboard an Illinois Central Railroad passenger car while the train was in Hammond, Indiana. These circumstances were so as to avoid the one year grace period after divorce that was required by the state of Illinois at the time.

=== Personal life in New Orleans ===
By the time of Stern's 1921 marriage, husband Edgar B. Stern was an established businessman in New Orleans. Stern became a New Orleans resident shortly after the marriage, and she quickly embraced life in New Orleans, immersing herself in various civic activities in addition to managing family life. So complete was her immersion in New Orleans life that her husband Edgar gave her the pet name "Yankee Creole".

The couple had three children, and they were active in their communities, like their parents, with respect to charitable, business, and artistic causes. Edgar B. Stern Jr. (1922–2008) was chairman of the Royal Street Corporation and completed extensive developments in the states of Colorado and Louisiana. He also served as a public relations director for United Way. Audrey Stern Hess (died 1974, age 50) was their middle child. She was chairman of the children's rights section of the Citizens Committee for Children. Their son Philip M. Stern (died 1992 at age 66) was a writer and a Democratic Party activist.

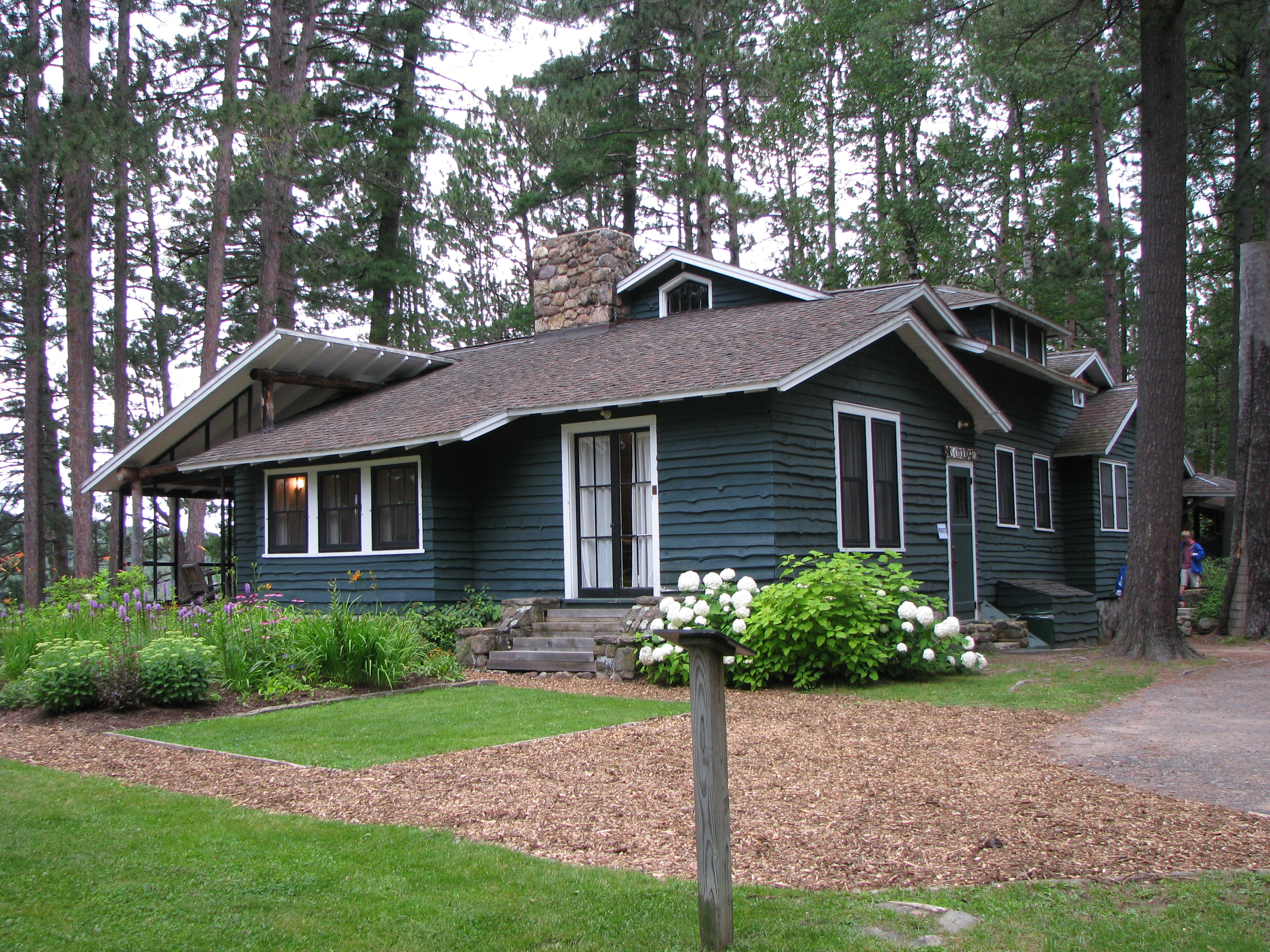
White Pine Camp – Owners' Cottage

In 1929, following a period of intense activity sponsoring educational causes, at a time coincident with the start of the Great Depression, Stern became ill and was admitted to the Riggs Sanitarium in Massachusetts, where she was diagnosed with ulcers and exhaustion. Following her recovery, in 1930, Stern and her husband Edgar, together with Stern's sister Adele Levy, acquired as a summer home the compound known as White Pine Camp, which had been the presidential retreat for President Calvin Coolidge. This home was located on Osgood Pond in the hamlet of Paul Smiths, New York and is an example of an Adirondack great camp. The home was often referred to as the "New York White House" during the Coolidge Administration. It served as a respite from the summertime heat and humidity in New Orleans. The Sterns and Levys often used the compound for entertaining friends and relatives, and they owned the home after World War II ended.

In a 1936 to 1937 visit to Europe and the Holy Lands of Palestine with her husband Edgar, Stern witnessed the tense political climate in Europe of the 1930s. The Sterns observed Europe's rising antisemitism, especially during their visits to Germany, and also the actions of Stalin during their time in Russia and the suffering of Polish Jews. They attended a session of the League of Nations Assembly and witnessed the coronation of King George VI. The Sterns considered their travels to be a rich source of ideas and influences to bring to their hometown of New Orleans. It is also made them more politically aware and enhanced their commitment to educational causes. The Sterns hosted many visitors from Europe and elsewhere at their New Orleans home as a result of their travels.

During World War II, Stern worked as a volunteer for the American Red Cross in New Orleans and in Washington, DC. This divided time was due to the fact that her husband Edgar was working for the United States Department of War as a "dollar a year man". Her efforts on behalf of the American Red Cross included membership drives and sales of war bonds. Shortly after World War II, Stern became active in the United Jewish Appeal, following the lead of her sister Adele who was the first chair of the National Women's Division.

Edith and Edgar Stern frequently attended the annual Tanglewood Music Festival in western Massachusetts. For this reason, Edith established a second summer home near Lenox, Massachusetts, purchasing a cottage home. She decorated this home entirely with furnishings selected from the Sears catalog, and she referred to this cottage as "Austerity Castle". The Sterns frequently hosted visiting musicians at the cottage, and offered visits there as a fringe benefit to servants on the Sterns' payroll.

=== Longue Vue House and Gardens ===
On moving to New Orleans, Stern and husband Edgar lived at Viara House, before establishing a permanent residence of their own. In 1921, the Sterns purchased eight acres of undeveloped land on the outskirts of New Orleans where they established sequentially two homes, both named Longue Vue. The name of the home came from an inn on the Hudson River that the couple enjoyed visiting early in their marriage. The following year, the Edith and Edgar Stern contracted construction of their first home on this property, which eventually became known as Longue Vue House I. This home was designed by architect Moise Goldstein in the Colonial Revival style.

In 1934, Edith Stern hired landscape architect Ellen Biddle Shipman to build an English landscape garden on this property. Although Shipman completed this project shortly thereafter, Shipman continued development of the gardens until her death in 1950. Horticulturalist Caroline Dormon made significant contributions to the design and construction of the gardens, who likewise continued to improve the gardens for years following initial construction.

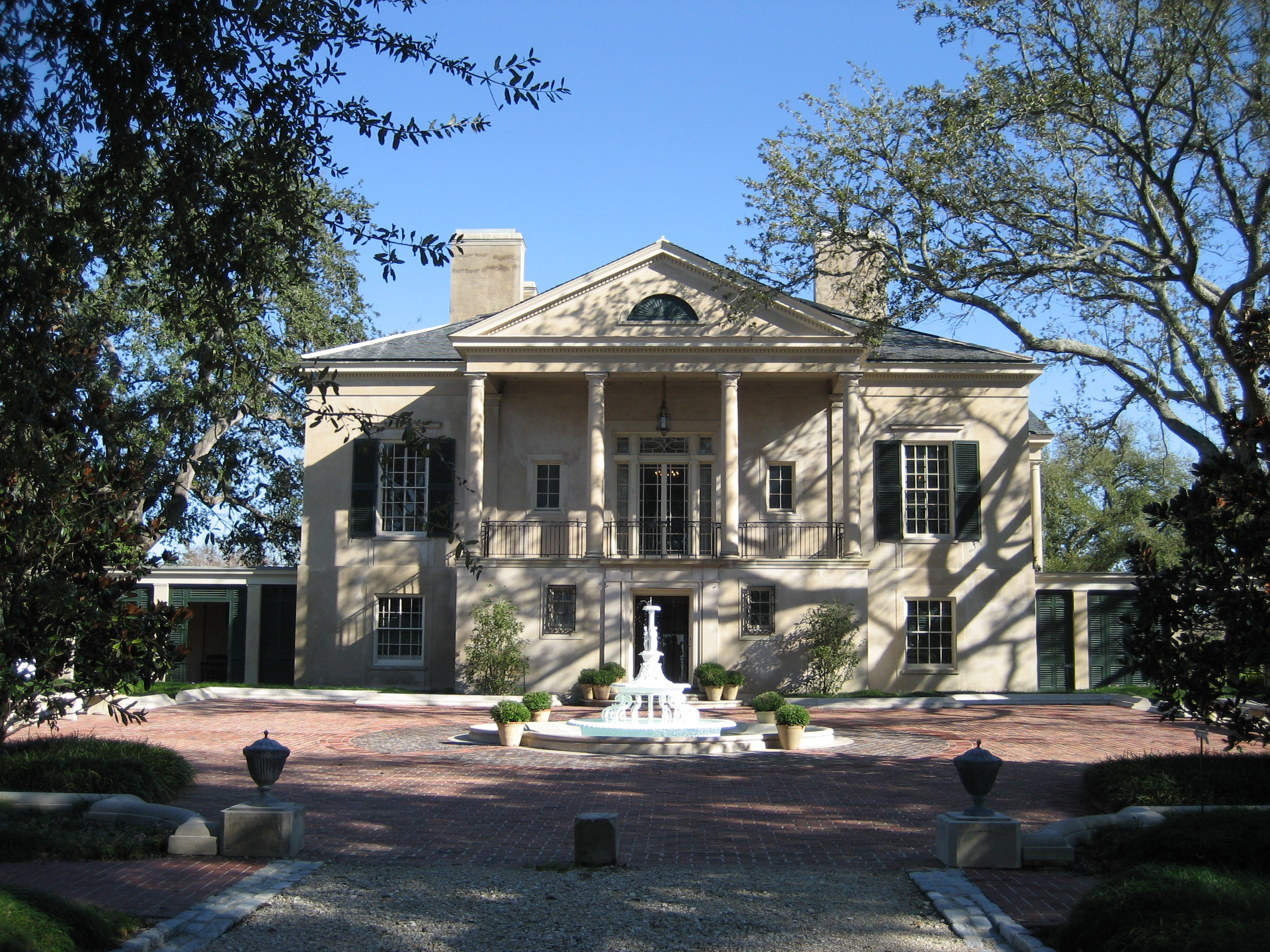
South Facade of Longue Vue House

In the late 1930s, Stern concluded that the home did not provide sufficient views of the gardens and that the property needed a new house that provided a cohesive design of both home and gardens. To this end, Stern commissioned architects William Platt and Geoffrey Platt. The construction extended until December 1942. The resulting home is in the Classical Greek Revival style, with each of the four facades being distinct. One of the facades, the one on the south, is suggestive of the Beauregard-Keyes House in the French Quarter of New Orleans. The house and gardens, sometimes known as Longue Vue II, are considered examples of the Country Place Era.

At the time of the construction of the second Longue Vue Gardens home, the original home was moved intact within the same neighborhood to another lot on Garden Lane.

In 1977, Stern bequeathed Longue Vue House and Gardens to the city of New Orleans, as an extension of the New Orleans Museum of Art. This donation included funds sufficient to convert the home from a private residence into a museum. This act was controversial at the time and was several years in the making, the controversy being based on a zoning dispute with neighbors. Resolution of the dispute required moving the entrance from Garden Lane to Bamboo Road.

=== Later life and death ===
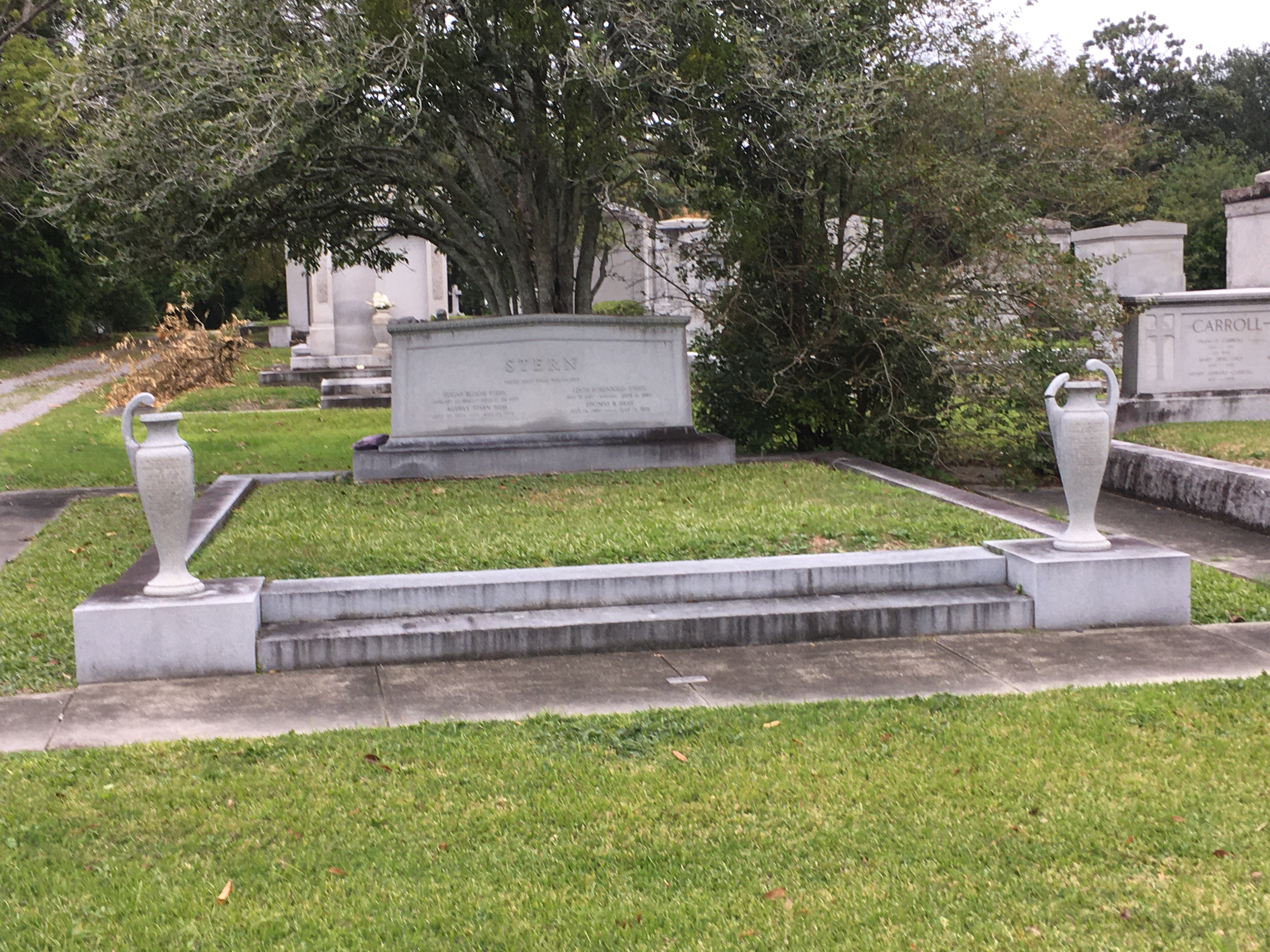
Stern Family Grave at Metairie Lakelawn Cemetery

Due to failing health, in 1978, Stern made her home at the Pontchartrain Hotel in New Orleans. The hotel management converted rooms 503, 504, and 505 into a suite to accommodate Stern. Stern died at her home in 1980 of complications from circulatory diseases. She is buried at Metairie Lakelawn Cemetery alongside her husband Edgar, her daughter Audrey and Audrey's husband. Replicas of the Times-Picayune Loving Cup awards that she and her husband each received are located at the foot of the grave site.

== Philanthropy ==
As part of her activist philanthropic tenets, Stern required that financial recipients have a personal vested interest in their philanthropic cause. This was a trait that she took on from her father Julius Rosenwald. She often used challenge grants to build support and extend financial backing for her causes and to help assure philanthropic objectives are satisfied.

=== Educational causes ===
Recognizing a need for early childhood education, in 1926, Stern founded the Newcomb School for pre-schoolers on the edge of the Tulane University campus. Besides financial backing, Stern selected administrators and remained involved in the management of the school in its early years. At the time, pre-school education was uncommon in the United States, and the Newcomb School was the first of its kind in the American South. Later, in 1957, when the school needed a new building, Stern commissioned Professor John Dinwiddie, then dean of the Tulane University School of Architecture, to design the facility. The new building opened in 1959.

Following her efforts on early childhood education, in 1929 Stern organized the founding of the Metairie Park Country Day School, for children from kindergarten through high school. Stern provided the initial funding to acquire 14 acres of land in Metairie, Louisiana, to be used for the campus. Stern remained involved in the organization of the school by setting up three committees, one to establish school policy, another to recruit a headmaster, and the third to acquire full funding for the school, including a scholarship program. The first headmaster was Ralph Boothby who served as headmaster until 1956. As part of school policy that continued under Boothby's tenure, the school instituted methods aimed at providing children with an environment in which they learn while playing and exploring. School policy de-emphasized homework until the children were older.

=== Patron of the arts ===
As a young woman, singer Marian Anderson often visited New Orleans, usually singing at churches with African-American congregations. Stern became acquainted with Anderson through Stern's own cook. As a result, Stern befriended Anderson and introduced her as an entertainer within New Orleans society. Stern continued as one of Anderson's patrons through her performing career.

Stern's support of the New Orleans Symphony began in earnest with a meeting in 1952 with newly installed general manager Thomas Greene. Besides her own financial gifts to the orchestra, Stern organized other fund-raising activities. An example was a fund-raiser featuring Parisian chef Raymond Oliver of Le Grand Véfour Restaurant who showcased his culinary talents for prominent American chefs for donations benefiting the orchestra. In this event, Sears-Roebuck donated the equipment for food preparation.

Stern was an early patron of African-American opera singer Annabelle Bernard and of New Orleans impressionist artist William Woodward. After hearing Bernard perform at Xavier University in 1955, Stern arranged for Bernard to have an audition with opera producer Boris Goldovsky. The success of this audition launched Bernard's professional career.

As a member of the board of trustees of the Delgado Museum in New Orleans, Stern worked with architect Arthur Quentin Davis to donate the Stern-Davis collection to the museum, emphasizing the Cusco School of art.

Stern provided the initial funding to create the New Orleans Repertory Theatre.

== Political involvement and civil rights ==
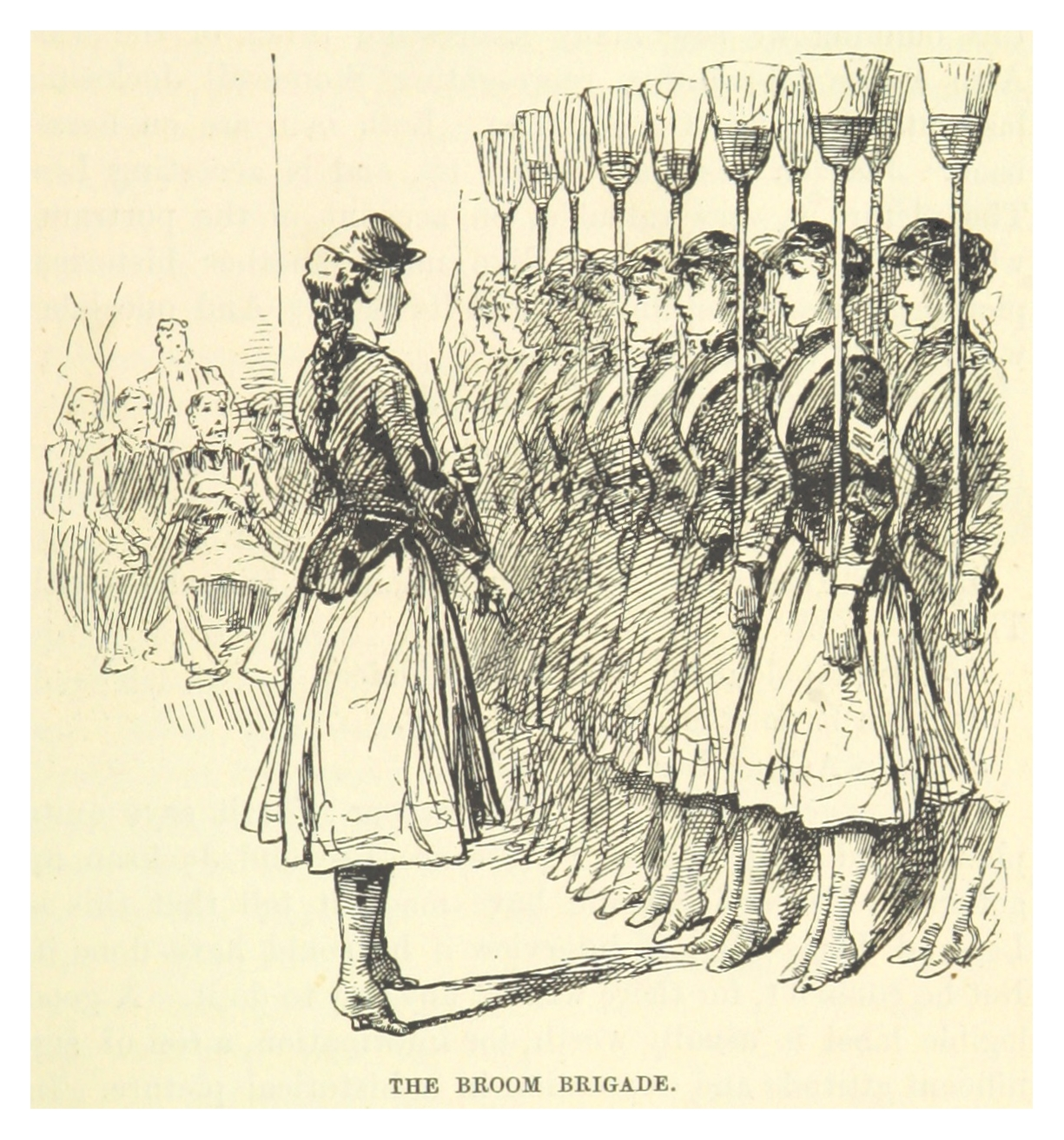
Depiction of a Women's Broom Brigade

By 1945, concerned women voters in New Orleans organized to reduce the power and influence of established political machines in the city. Stern became part of this effort, and she worked on behalf of politician Chep Morrison who was then a candidate for mayor and who promised to break such political machines. Stern organized the "Women's Broom Brigade", aimed at "a clean sweep" of New Orleans city government. As leader of the group, she organized a march of women carrying brooms across the city ultimately going to the Jerusalem Temple. The Morrison candidacy won the election, and Stern continued to work on behalf of reform of local government.

Stern subsequently took on the issue of voter fraud and worked with the Voter Registration League, as well as the League of Women Voters, on this issue. She organized efforts to educate future voters in New Orleans, including bringing voting machines into local high schools to familiarize young people with the voting process. Mayor Morrison appointed her to the Parkway and Park Commission of the City of New Orleans.

In 1952, as part of her efforts on the U.S. presidential campaign of Adlai Stevenson, Edith Stern hosted then-candidate Stevenson for several days at Longue Vue House during an extended campaign stop in Louisiana. During this campaign season, Stern also hosted John F. Kennedy at her home. At one point during this visit, Stern hosted a dinner party that included Stevenson, Kennedy, and entertainer Ethel Merman, as well as other politically active New Orleanians. Considering the Republican-leaning of her husband Edgar and some of the guests, these events enabled interactions across party lines in this campaign stop. During these campaign events, the Sterns conceived of the idea of Pontchartrain Park, a suburban-style middle-class neighborhood for African-Americans during the Jim Crow South, a project that the Sterns ultimately backed.

Stern continued her involvement in Democratic Party politics at both the local level and national level. In 1960, she attended the Democratic National Convention in Los Angeles, California, in a private box to watch the nomination of John F. Kennedy. Following Kennedy's inauguration as President of the United States, he appointed Stern to the National Cultural Center Advisory Committee on the Arts. Locally, Stern directed the Stern Family Fund to support the Institute of Politics, which is an organization at Loyola University that helped prepare young politicians for their careers.

For the 1970 New Orleans mayoral election, Stern supported the candidacy of Moon Landrieu. Following his election victory, Landrieu was seen locally as being the first true liberal to hold the post, and he was the first New Orleans mayor to fully engage African-Americans in city government. As mayor, he continued to rely on Stern's advice and counsel through his terms of office.

As a member of the board of directors of the Stern Family Fund, Edith Stern made frequent use of the fund to advance causes of African-American education, civil rights, civic responsibility, and corporate responsibility. Engagement in matters of corporate responsibility was controversial among the fund's board, and Stern's son resigned from the board in protest over this policy. The Sterns also directed significant aid to historically black colleges such as Dillard University.

Beginning in 1967, Stern established a fund to aid in the legal defense of Clay Shaw who was alleged to have conspired to assassinate John F. Kennedy. Although Stern was a strong supporter of President Kennedy, Stern was casually acquainted with Shaw through their mutual interest in French Quarter restoration projects. Following Shaw's acquittal of the legal charges, Stern commissioned Shaw to carry out restoration projects of homes that Stern owned, especially in the New Orleans French Quarter.

In the late 1960s and early 1970s, Stern led several significant fund-raising efforts in New Orleans to benefit the Women's Division of the United Jewish Appeal.

=== Opposition ===
Stern received near daily hate mail as a result of her efforts on civil rights.

Stern supported candidate Adrian G. Duplantier in the 1962 mayoral election in New Orleans. Duplantier's opponent Victor H. Schiro produced campaign literature depicting Duplantier as a political puppet of Stern.

== Awards and recognition ==
- A 1945 portrait of Stern by artist Malthe M. Hasselriis is housed at the Smithsonian American Art Museum.
- The New Orleans Times-Picayune newspaper presented its Loving Cup award to Stern in 1964 for her charitable, civic, and political work. Her husband Edgar B. Stern in 1930 had also received the same award, making them the only husband-wife couple so honored.
- In 1968, Life Magazine named Edith Stern one of the "'Grandes Dames' Who Grace America".
- Stern received the Hannah G. Solomon Award in 1971 for the New Orleans Section of the National Council of Jewish Women.
- In 1977, the New Orleans States-Item newspaper named Edith Stern and Edgar Stern the city's outstanding philanthropists.
- Chaim Herzog, Israel's ambassador to the United Nations, acting on behalf of the nation of Israel, planted a tree in Edith Stern's honor on the property of Longue Vue Gardens, on May 21, 1978.
- In 1984, Gerda Weissmann Klein published a biography of Edith Stern.
- In 2018 the New Orleans Times-Picayune newspaper named Stern to its "300 for 300" list of people who have had lasting impact on the city of New Orleans.

== Legacy ==
Stern's enduring legacy includes the Longue Vue House and Gardens, contributions to education through endowment of schools and their establishment, aid to music and the fine arts, and advances in voting rights and civil rights in the American South. She helped form the Stern Family Fund which provided seed money for social entrepreneurs.

== External links and further reading ==
- A Passion for Sharing: The Life of Edith Rosenwald Stern, by Gerda Weissmann Klein. Chappaqua, N.Y.: Rossel, 1984. ISBN 0940646153
- Longue Vue House & Gardens
- Wikimedia Commons category on Longue Vue House & Gardens
