= Albert Joseph Brown =

Canadian lawyer and politician

The Hon. Albert Joseph Brown
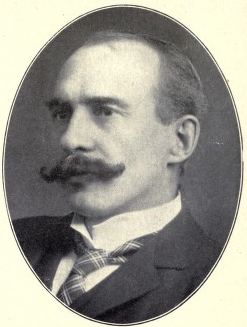

Senator for Wellington, Quebec
- In office October 6, 1932 – November 16, 1938
- Appointed by: R. B. Bennett
- Preceded by: Wilfrid Laurier McDougald
- Succeeded by: Charles Benjamin Howard

Personal details
- Born: July 8, 1861 Windsor, Canada East
- Died: November 16, 1938 (aged 77)
- Party: Conservative

Albert Joseph Brown KC (July 8, 1861 – November 16, 1938) was a Canadian lawyer and politician.

Born in Windsor, Canada East, the son of Shepard Joseph Brown, a farmer, and Jennet Shanks, Brown was educated at St. Francis College and Morin College before receiving a Bachelor of Arts degree in 1883 and a Bachelor of Laws degree in 1886 from McGill University. He was called to the Quebec Bar in 1886 and was created a Queen's Counsel in 1899. He was a practising lawyer before being appointed to the Senate of Canada by R. B. Bennett in 1932. He sat as a Conservative until his death in 1938.
