= Northbrook Lodge =

- U.S. National Register of Historic Places
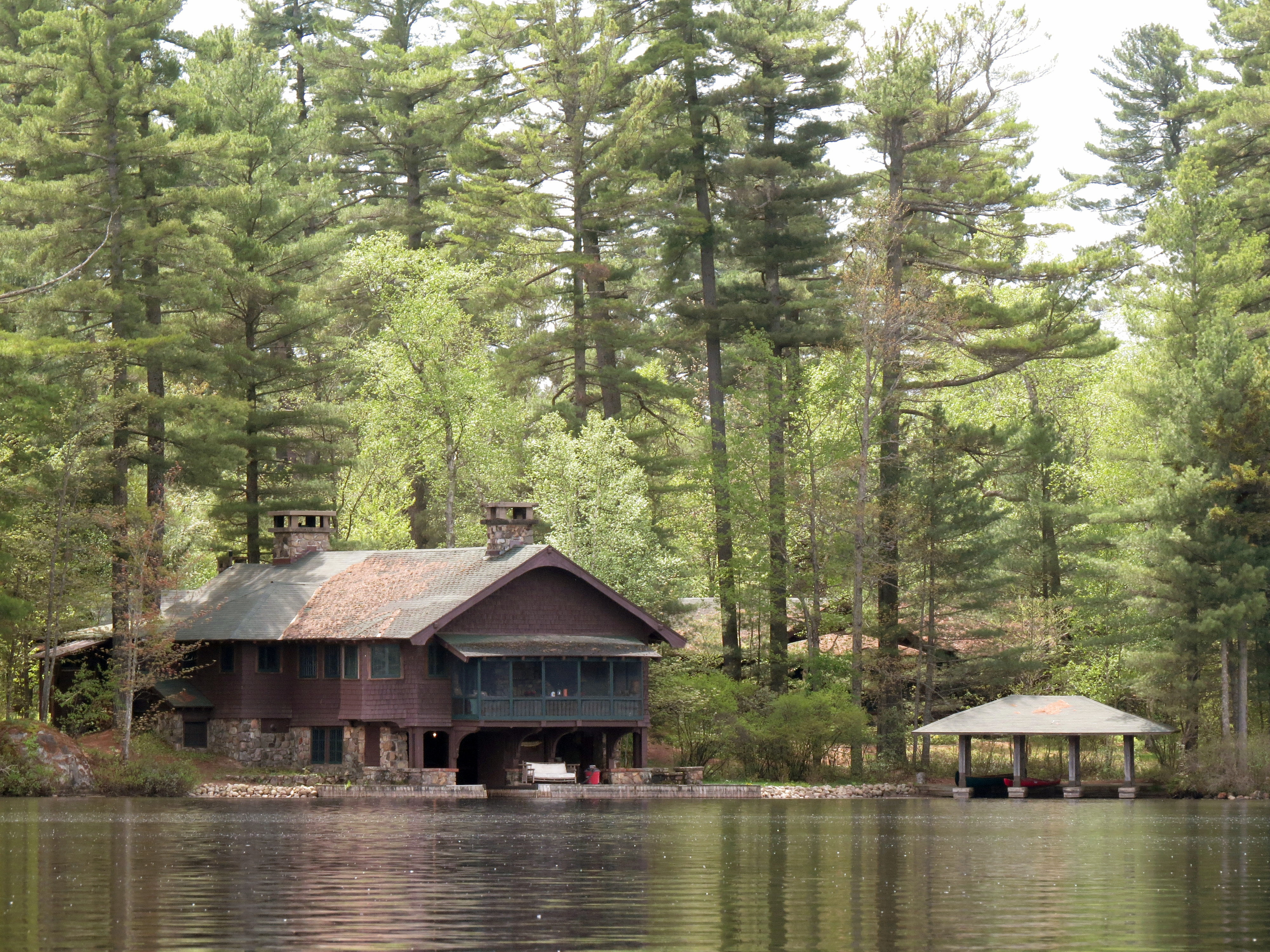

- Location within New York Location within the United States
- Location: 58 Northbrook Rd. Paul Smiths, New York
- Coordinates: 44°26′47″N 74°13′35″W
- Area: 8.55 acres (3.46 ha)
- Built: c. 1919, c. 1922
- Built by: Muncil, Benjamin
- Architectural style: Craftsman
- NRHP reference No.: 14000127
- Added to NRHP: April 7, 2014

Northbrook Lodge on Osgood Pond is a historic camp located within the Adirondack Forest Preserve in Paul Smiths in Franklin County, New York. The camp complex was built by noted great camp builder Benjamin A. Muncil for Canadian Senator Wilfrid Laurier McDougald Construction took circa 1925. Contributing resources in the camp complex include a small stone electrical building; covered canoe slips; pumphouse; stone bridge; guideboat house; tennis cottage and court; dining room; kitchen; breezeway; library; shuffleboard court; Marcy cabin; boathouse; Gabriels cabin; Main cabin; Whiteface cabin; and Fairfield / staff house. The buildings exhibit American Craftsman style architectural influences. Northbrook Lodge was operate as a summer resort until 2009 and is now privately owned.

It was listed on the National Register of Historic Places in 2014.
