= Brighton Town Hall, New York =

- Brighton Town Hall
- U.S. National Register of Historic Places
- New York State Register of Historic Places
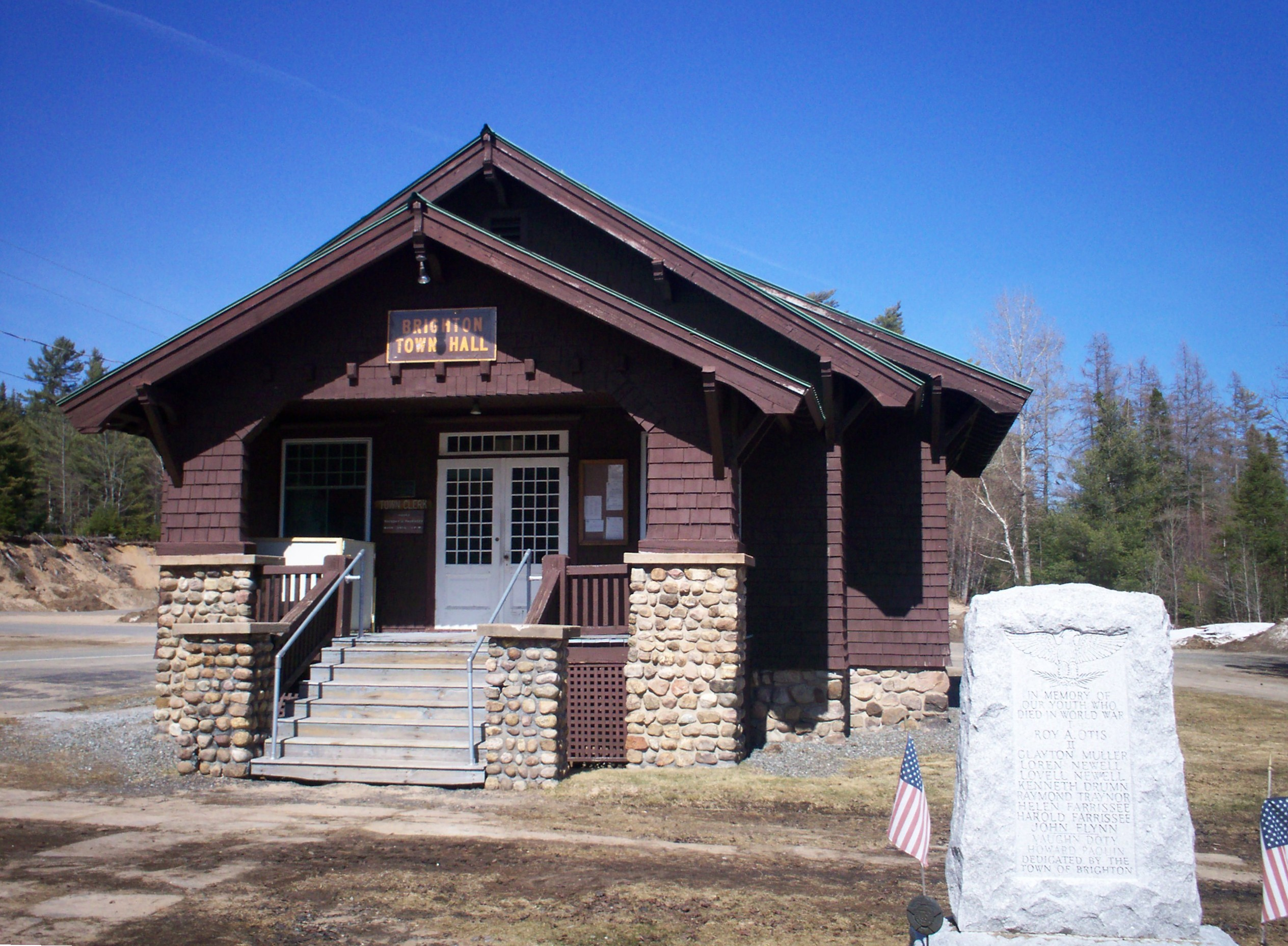
- Brighton Town Hall, April 2008

- Location within New York Location within the United States
- Location: 12 Cty Rd. 31, Brighton, New York
- Coordinates: 44°26′27″N 74°13′57″W
- Area: less than one acre
- Built: 1914
- Architect: Muncil, Benjamin A.
- Architectural style: Bungalow/Craftsman
- NRHP reference No.: 03001121
- NYSRHP No.: 03306.000098

Significant dates
- Added to NRHP: November 7, 2003
- Designated NYSRHP: September 7, 2003

Brighton Town Hall is a historic town hall located at Brighton, Franklin County, New York. It was built in 1914 and is a modest, one story American Craftsman style building measuring 35 feet wide and 58 feet deep. It rests on a fieldstone foundation with exposed cobblestone piers at the front. It features three telescoping, graduated gables with exposed rafters and decorative braces. The interior contains a large, 30 feet by 34 feet meeting hall. It was designed by architect Benjamin A. Muncil.

It was listed on the National Register of Historic Places in 2003.
