= Benjamin A. Muncil =

American master builder

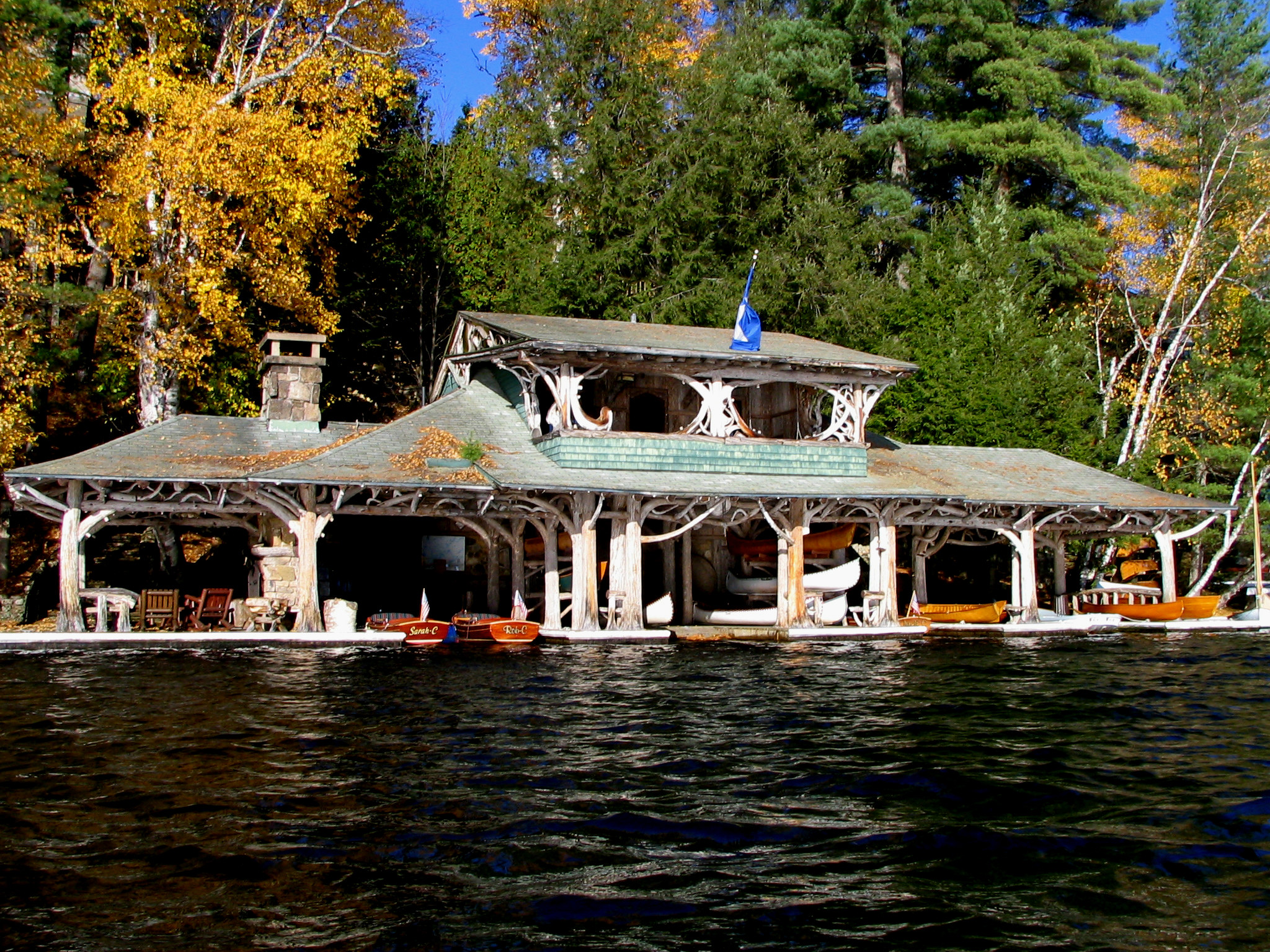
Boathouse at Camp Topridge

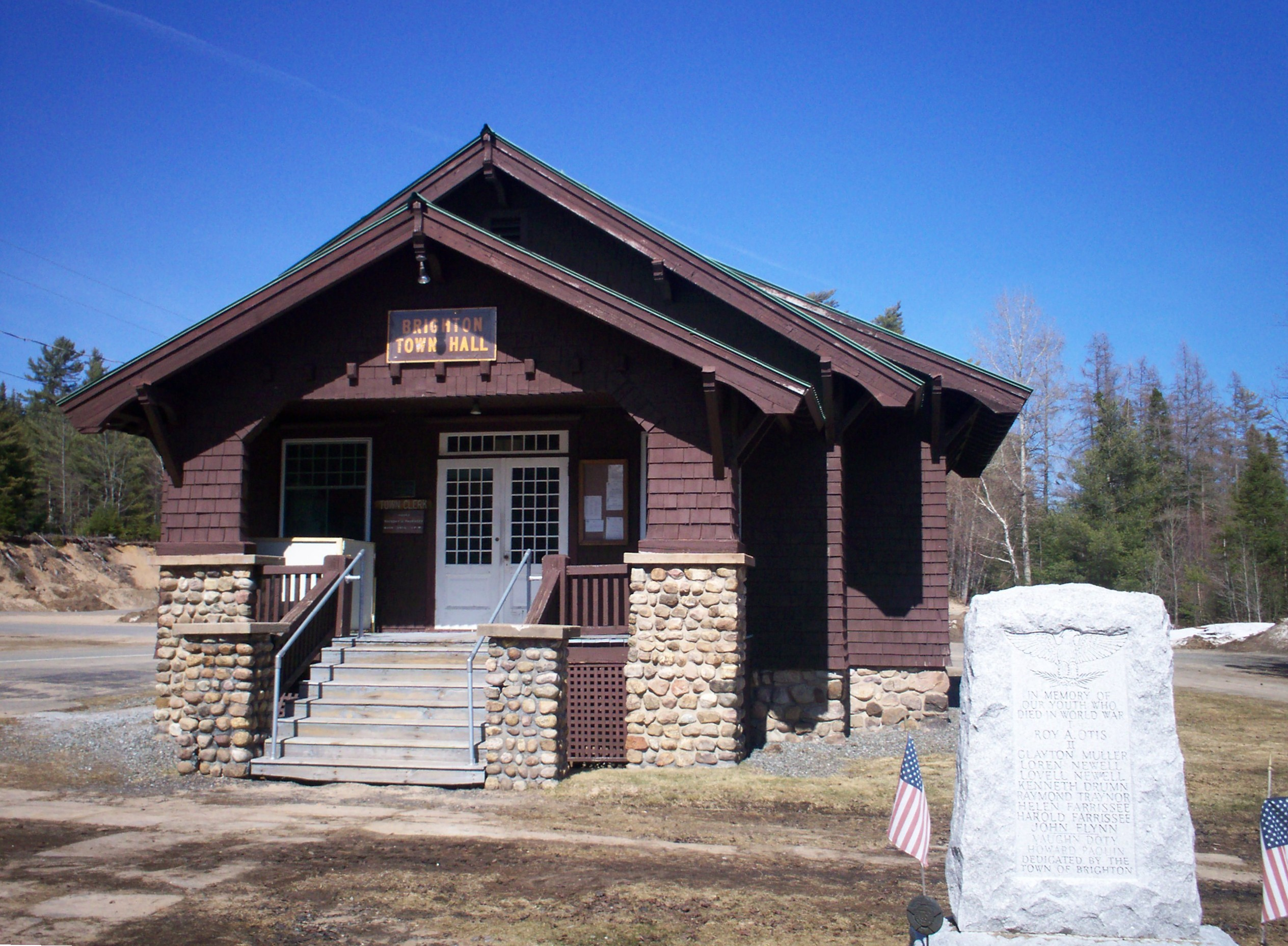
Brighton Town Hall, Brighton, Franklin County, New York

Benjamin A. Muncil (28 Aug 1867 – 16 Dec 1930) was an American master builder in the Adirondacks early in the 20th century. He was a major figure in the architectural development of the Adirondack Great Camps; among his many projects was Marjorie Merriweather Post's Camp Topridge, Northbrook Lodge, and White Pine Camp, a summer White House of US President Calvin Coolidge.

Born in Vermontville, New York, he started life as a lumberman at age 14 and as a guide and camp caretaker on Upper St. Regis Lake at age 18. He was the first to use "brainstorm siding," wavy-edged cladding, in place of clapboard, at several camps, including White Pine Camp on Osgood Pond in 1907. Other projects included Camp Longwood and the Huntington camp, both on Spitfire Lake, and the Little Camp on Upper St. Regis Lake. The main boathouse at Topridge, with its curving cedar railings and twig work screens, is one of the major and last examples of the naturalistic rustic tradition introduced by W. W. Durant. He also designed the American Craftsman style Brighton Town Hall at Brighton, New York in 1914 and Northbrook Lodge at Paul Smiths, New York in 1919–1922.
