= Wilfrid Laurier McDougald =

Canadian politician

The Hon. Wilfrid Laurier McDougald

Senator for Wellington, Quebec
- In office June 25, 1926 – May 3, 1932
- Appointed by: William Lyon Mackenzie King
- Preceded by: William Mitchell
- Succeeded by: Albert Joseph Brown

Personal details
- Born: August 9, 1881 Alexandria, Ontario
- Died: June 19, 1942 (aged 60)
- Party: Liberal

Wilfrid Laurier McDougald (August 9, 1881 – June 19, 1942) was a Canadian senator.

Born in Alexandria, Ontario, he was educated at McGill University (where he was a member of Kappa Alpha Society) and Queen's University and practiced medicine in Montreal. He was appointed Chairman of the Montreal Harbour Commission in 1922.

In 1926, he was appointed to the Senate representing the senatorial division of Wellington, Quebec. He resigned in 1932 as a result of the Beauharnois Scandal.

He built Northbrook Lodge at Paul Smiths, New York between about 1919 and 1922. It was listed on the U.S. National Register of Historic Places in 2014.

== Archives ==
There is a Wilfrid Laurier McDougald fonds at Library and Archives Canada.
