= Twig work =

Decorative motifs using parts of trees

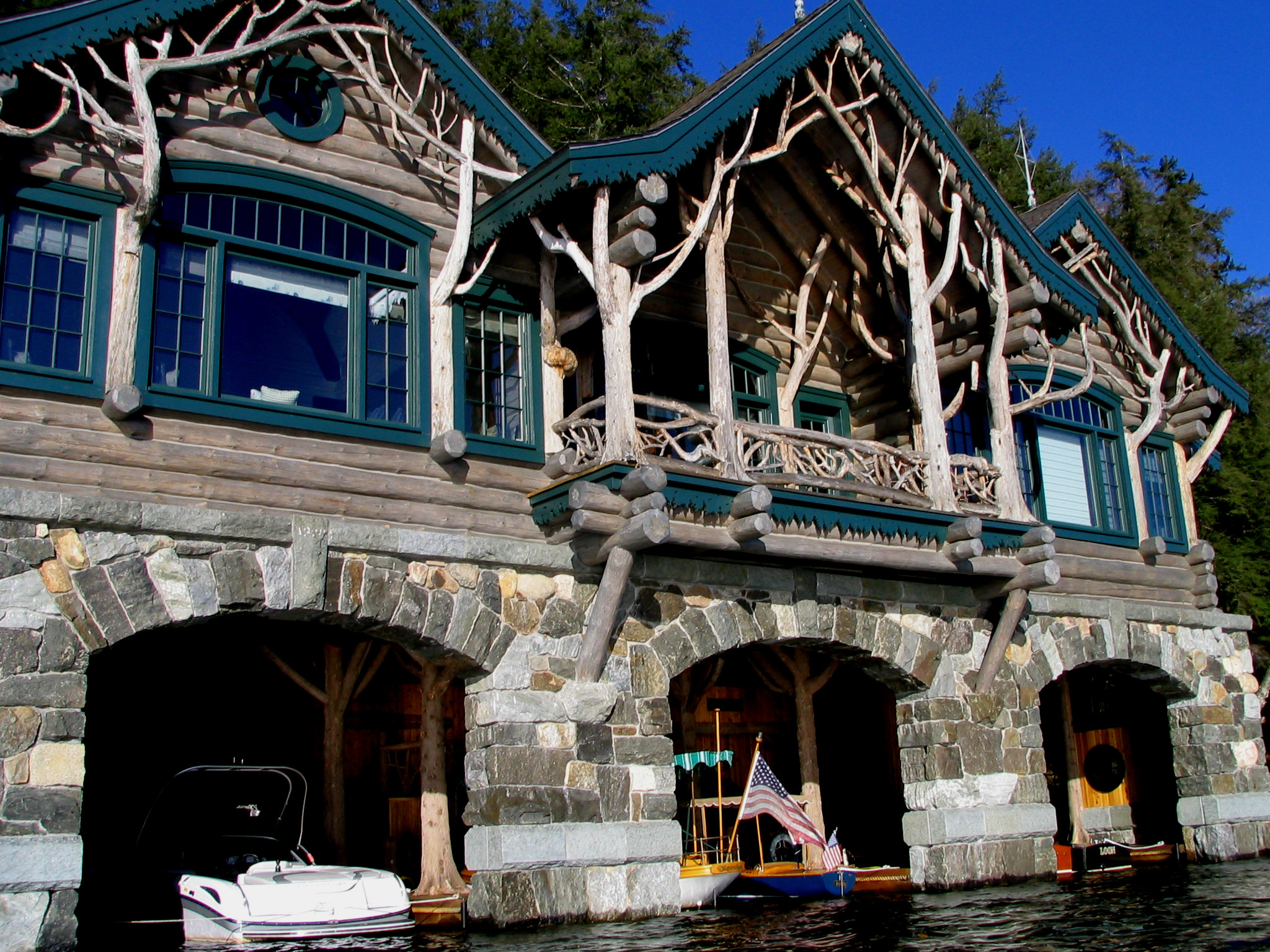
Twig work at Camp Topridge

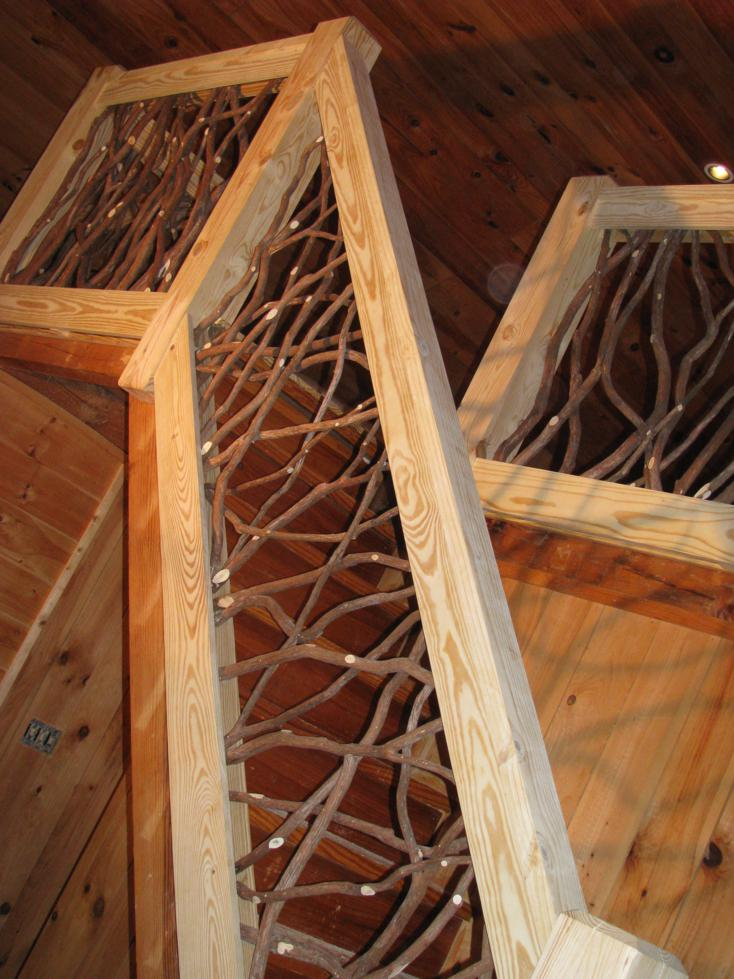
Twig work on stair railing

Twig-work is the term applied to architectural details constructed of twigs and branches to form decorative motifs in buildings and furniture. Carpentry or woodworking using wood that has not been milled into lumber and is still in its natural shape describes the national park service rustic style.

== Construction ==
Joinery on twigs and branches is similar to joinery for lumber. Mortise and tenon joints are strong, but also labor-intensive and time-consuming. Twigs and branches can also be fastened with nails. Where one branch meets another, the ends must be coped, or cut to match the curve.

== See also ==
- Bentwood
- Echo Camp
- Knollwood Club
- Rustic furniture
