= Osgood Pond =

Body of water in New York, United States

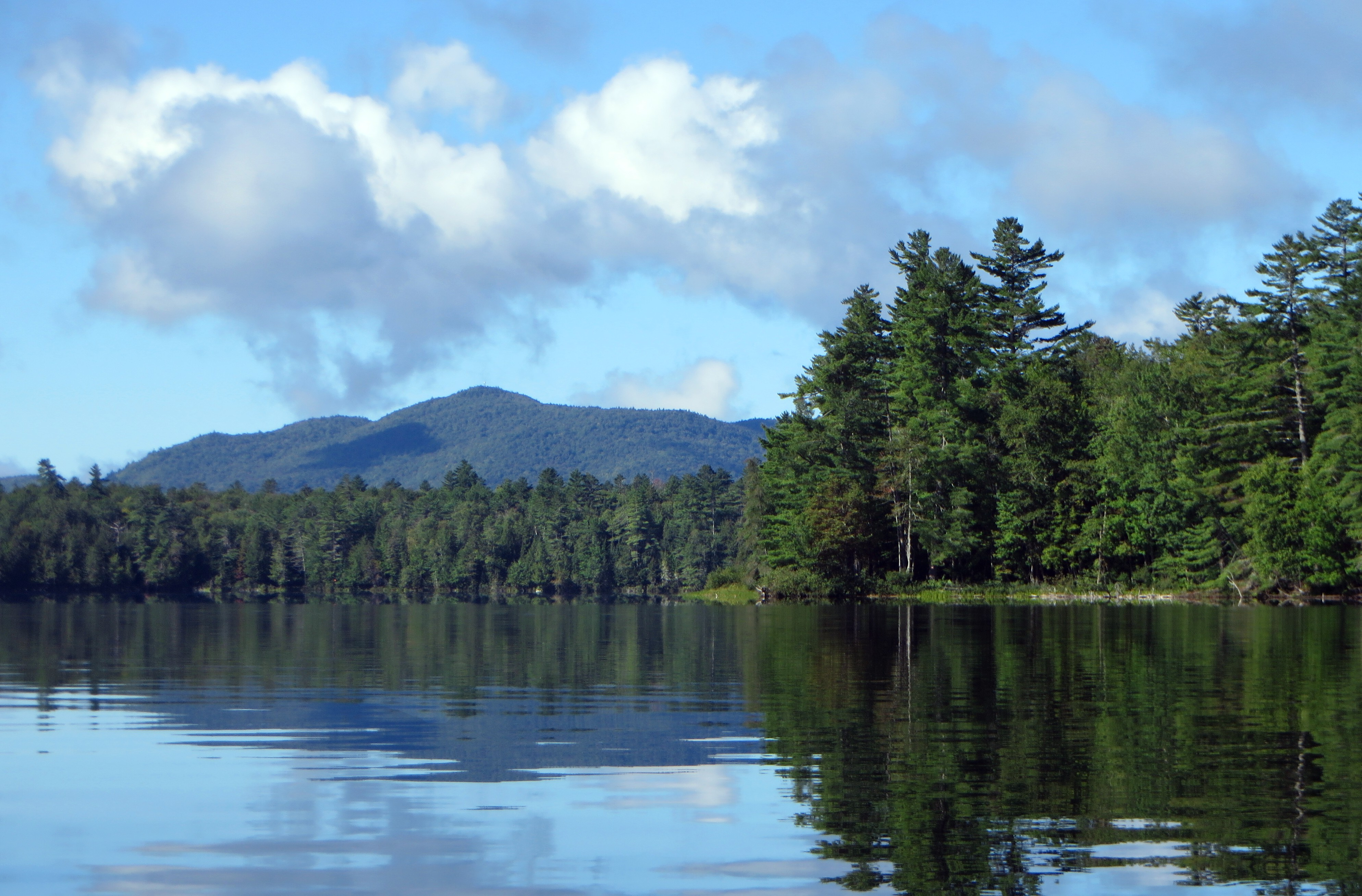
- East end of Osgood Pond, looking southwest towards Saint Regis Mountain.

- Location within New York Osgood Pond (the United States)
- Location: Town of Brighton, Franklin County, New York, United States
- Coordinates: 44.451215°N 74.237139°W
- Max. length: 1.5 mi (2.4 km)
- Max. width: 3,166 ft (965 m)
- Surface area: 515 acres (208 ha)
- Max. depth: 15 ft (4.6 m)
- Islands: 1

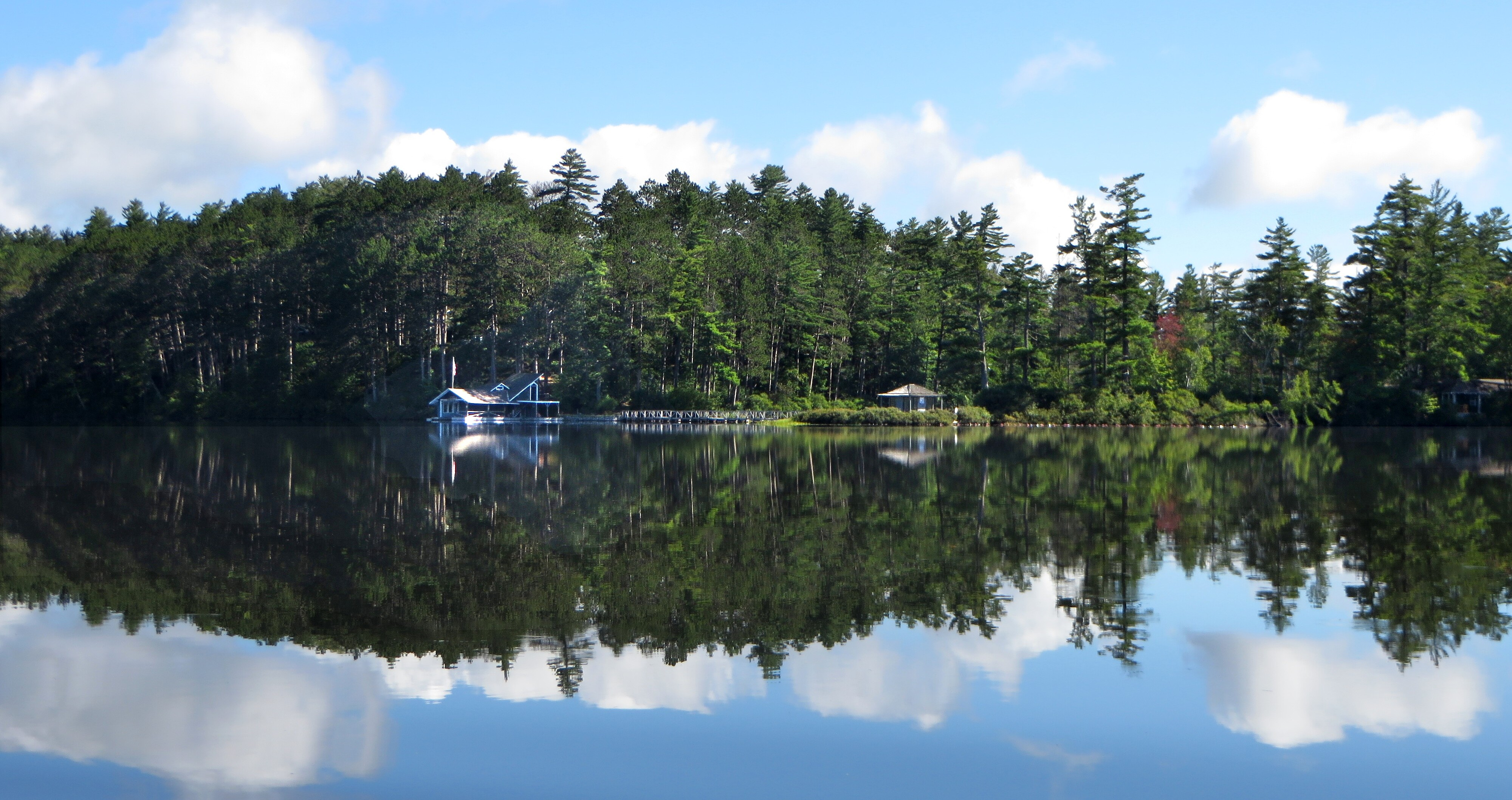
White Pine Camp on Osgood Pond, the Boat House and Tea Room

Osgood Pond is a five hundred acre lake in the hamlet of Paul Smiths, Town of Brighton, Franklin County, New York. It is the site of White Pine Camp, the Summer White House of President Calvin Coolidge, and of the historic Northbrook Lodge, listed on the National Register of Historic Places in 2014. Both were built by Benjamin A. Muncil.

Osgood pond is mesotrophic and circumneutral. It has adequate pH buffering capacity and therefore has low sensitivity to acid rain deposition. Due to its close proximity to State Route 30 it is moderately impacted by road salt pollution, with a total chloride concentration of 9.7 mg/L.

== Natural history ==
Fish species found in Osgood Pond include largemouth bass, northern pike, and brook trout. The lake is a popular location for ice fishing in the winter.

=== Invasive Species ===
Two invasive snail species are found in Osgood Pond, the Chinese mystery snail and the banded mystery snail. No invasive plant species or zooplankton species have been detected in the lake.
