= Camp Topridge =

Adirondack Park camp in Keese Mill, New York

- U.S. National Register of Historic Places
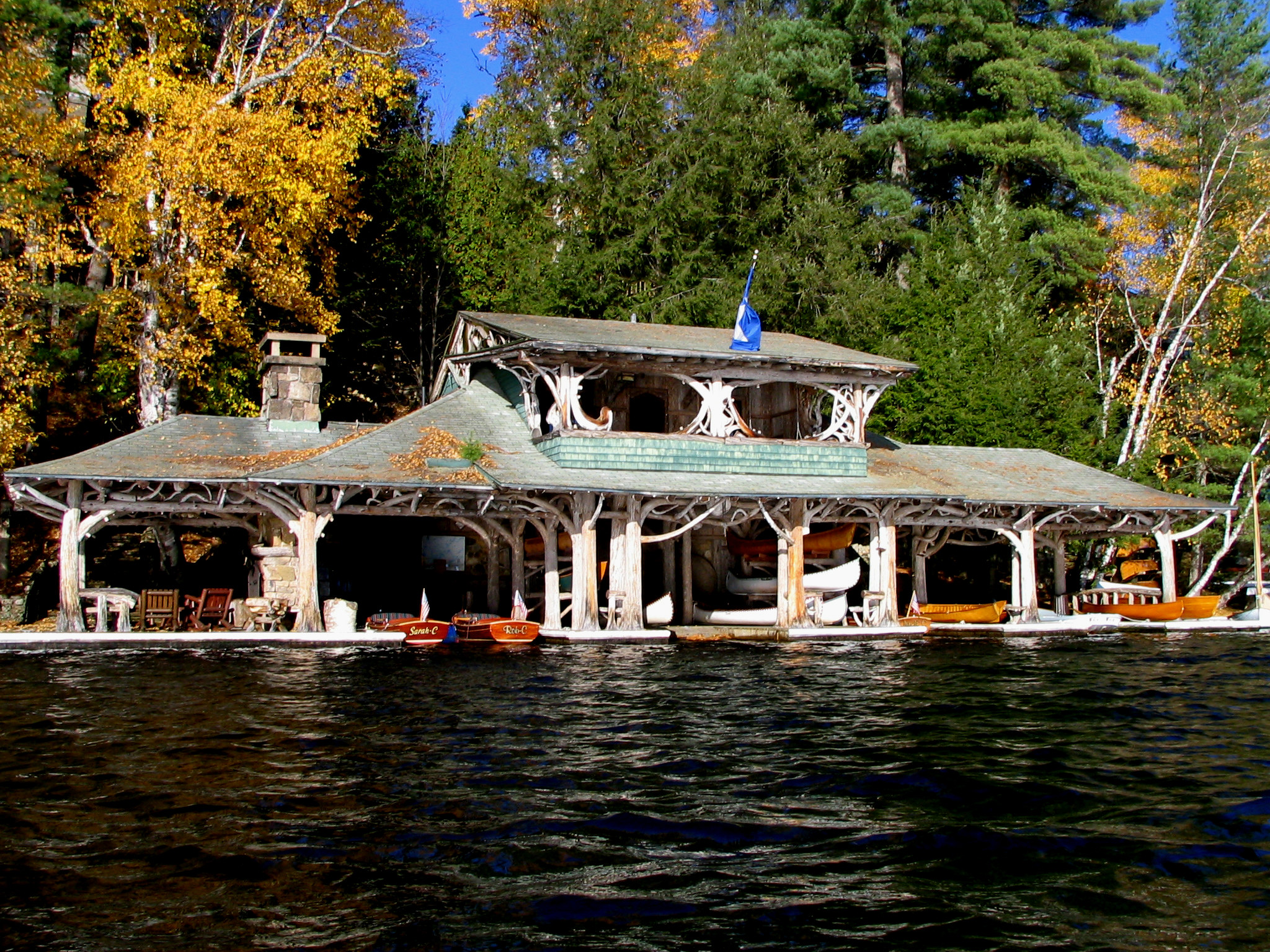
- The boathouse at Topridge

- Location within New York Location within the United States
- Location: S of Keese Mills Rd., Upper St. Regis Lake, Keese Mill, New York
- Coordinates: 44.417°N 74.2985°W
- Area: 105 acres (42 ha)
- Built: 1923
- Built by: Muncil, Benjamin
- Architect: Blake, Theodore
- Architectural style: Adirondack rustic
- MPS: Great Camps of the Adirondacks TR
- NRHP reference No.: 86002952
- Added to NRHP: November 7, 1986

Camp Topridge is an Adirondack Park Great Camp bought in 1920 and substantially expanded and renovated in 1923 by Marjorie Merriweather Post, former owner of General Foods and the daughter of C. W. Post. The "camp", near Keese Mill, in the U.S. state of New York, was considered by Post to be a "rustic retreat"; it consisted of 68 buildings, including a fully staffed main lodge and private guest cabins, each staffed with its own butler. It was one of the largest of the Adirondack great camps and possibly the most elaborately furnished.

The camp had 207 acres (84 ha) and was situated on an esker between the Spectacle Ponds and Upper St. Regis Lake, about 12 miles (19 km) northwest of Saranac Lake, New York. The estate was designed by local builder Ben Muncil in collaboration with New York architect Theodore Blake.

As originally built, the property could only be reached by water, though a driveway was added in later years. Guests arrived by floatplane or Post's boat at a private dock, and thence via funicular to the main building at the top of the ridge. Three times each week, guests would gather in the 65-by-50-foot (20 by 15 m) living room where full-length movies could be screened; an adjoining dining room seated thirty guests. Many of the original furnishings of the room, which included an extensive collection of American Indian artifacts, are now in the Smithsonian Institution. Among the many elaborate structures on the property is a Russian dacha built for Post's third husband, who had served as ambassador to the Soviet Union.

The staff would arrive from Keese Mills Road in Paul Smiths and drive around the water and leave their cars in a parking lot, now used as public parking for the trail to Saint Regis Mountain; the trailhead is near the private property line of Camp Topridge. From the parking lot, staff would walk a hilly, unpaved path into the workers' side of the camp. In the early 1970s, this unpaved path was widened and became suitable for one-way car traffic. Prior to the paving, vehicles could only be driven over the ice in the winter.

Post's guests would arrive at Saranac Airport (in Lake Clear), often in her private Vickers Viscount, the Merriweather. They would be driven to a launch which would take them to one of the boat houses. From there, they could either take the stairs or ride a covered, six-person electronic lift or funicular, installed for Post's aunt Molly Post, who suffered from heart trouble. For years, the caretaker of the camp and his wife would feed lunch to staff in a dining room in the caretaker's home.

Post bequeathed the property to the State of New York. The main lodge, most of the buildings and 105 acres (42 ha) were offered for sale, while the remaining acreage became part of the Adirondack Forest Preserve. Roger Jakubowski purchased the camp in 1985 for $911,000. It is now owned by Texas real estate magnate Harlan Crow, who purchased it in 1994 when Jakubowski went bankrupt. Crow has substantially restored the buildings and added several new ones. The property was listed on the National Register of Historic Places in 1986.

As reported by ProPublica in 2023, Supreme Court Justice Clarence Thomas is one of Crow's regular guests, spending a week each summer at Topridge for the past two decades. One of the decorations at the lodge is a photo-realistic painting by Sharif Tarabay of Thomas, Crow, and lawyers Peter B. Rutledge, Leonard Leo and Mark Paoletta lounging in Adirondack chairs at the lodge in 2018.

== Gallery ==
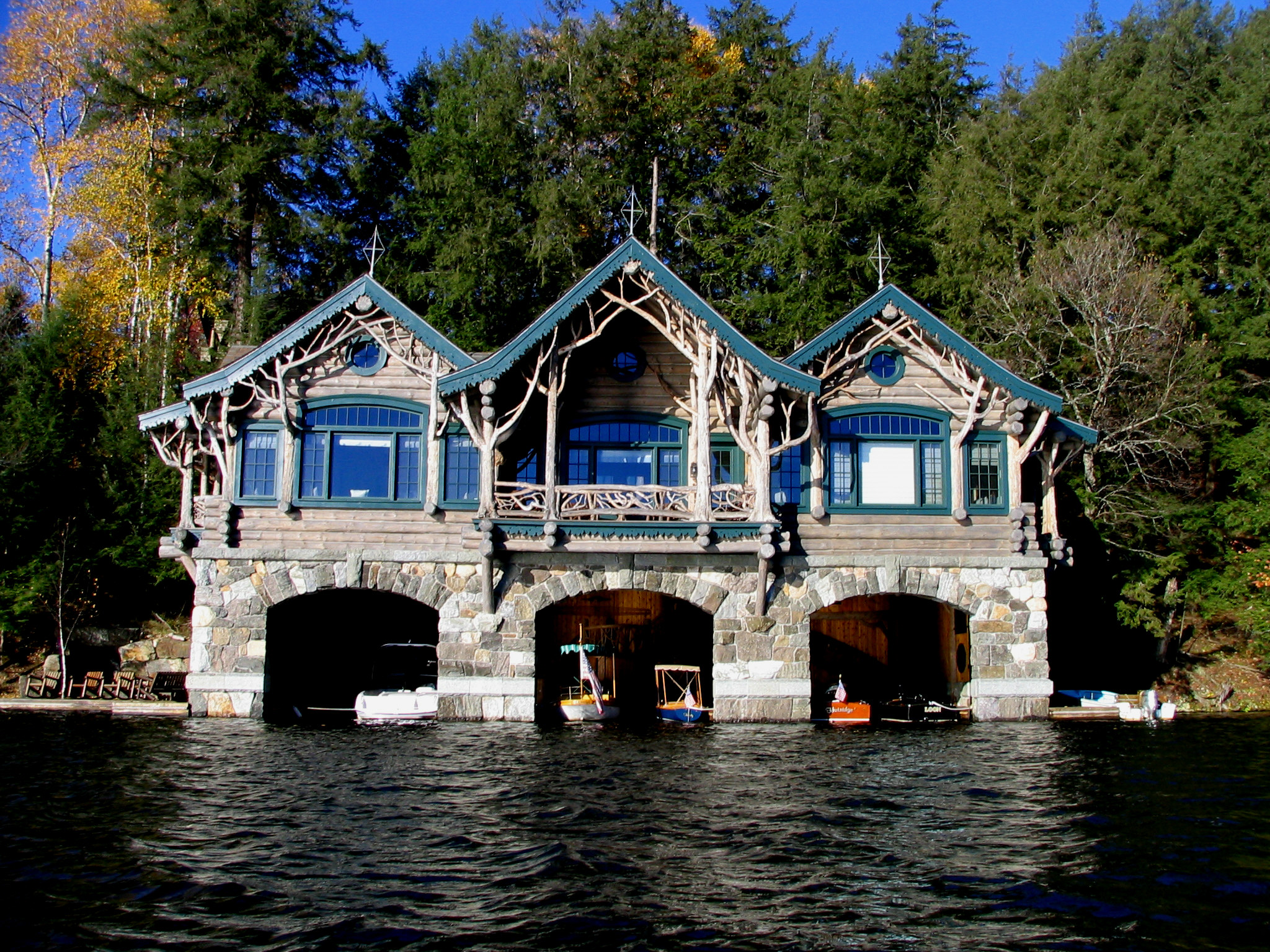
The second boathouse at Topridge, added by Harlan Crow

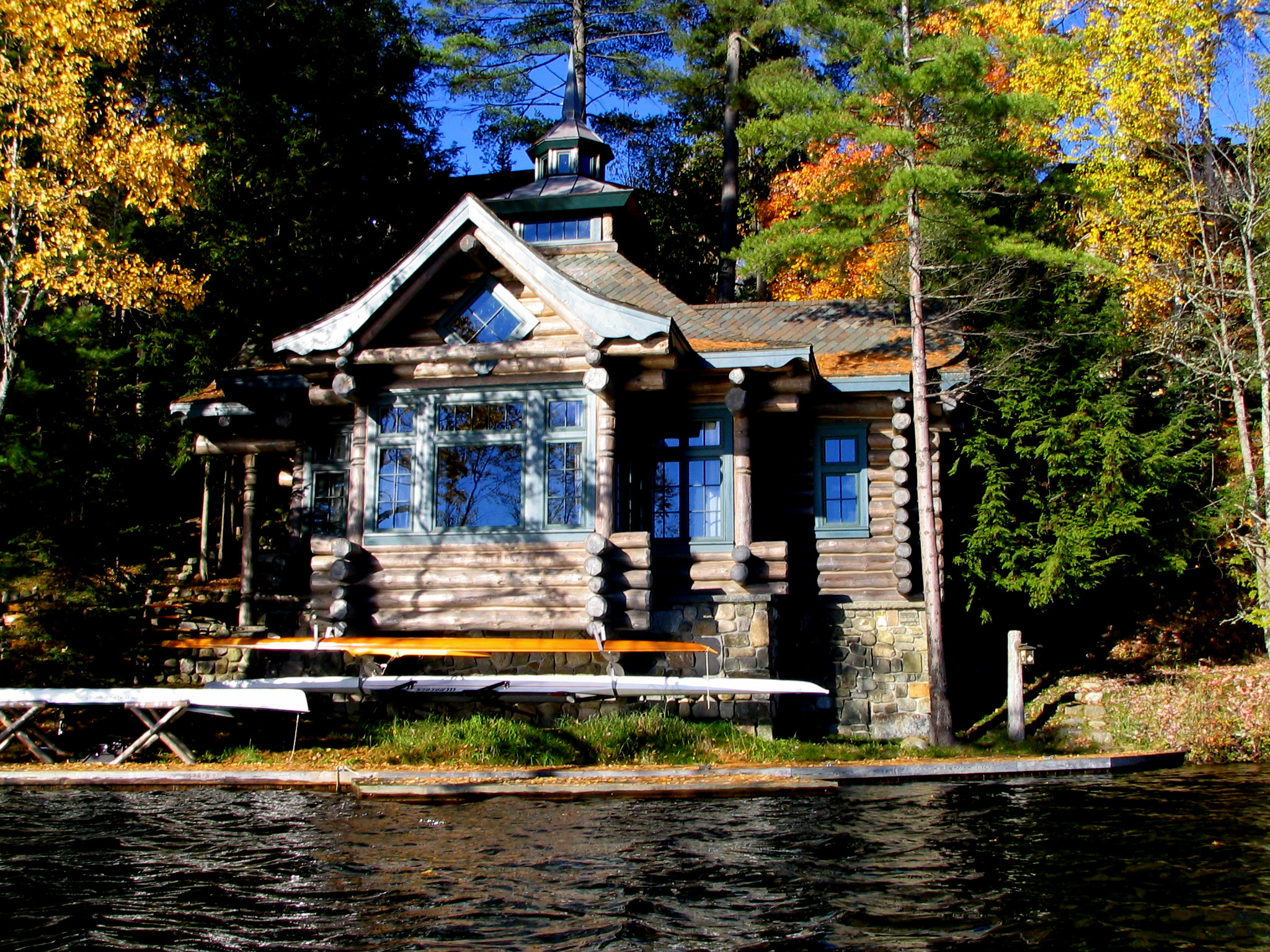
A newer building between the two boathouses.
