= John Luther (disambiguation) =

John Luther is the central character in TV series Luther.

John Luther may also refer to:

- John Luther (MP) (c. 1739-86), Member of the Parliament of Great Britain for Essex
- John Luther (basketball), member of 1923 NCAA Men's Basketball All-Americans
- John Luther (captain) (died 1645), mariner in New England, family connection of Robert Abell
- John Luther, an Indian film in Malayalam language.

== See also ==
- Jon L. Luther, American businessman
- John Luther Adams, American composer
