= Laura James =

American model and actress (born 1990)

- Born: November 18, 1990 (age 35); Cambridge, New York, U.S.
- Occupations: Model; actress
- Years active: 2012–present
- Parent: John James (father)
- Modeling information
- Height: 5 ft 11 in (1.80 m)
- Hair color: Brown
- Eye color: Green
- Agency: New York Model Management

Laura Ellen James (born November 18, 1990) is an American model and actress. In 2012, James won the nineteenth cycle of America's Next Top Model and was consequentially signed with L.A. Models and New York Model Management. She is the daughter of Dynasty actor John James.

== Early life ==
James was born in Cambridge, New York to American actor John James and Australian model Denise Coward, second runner-up in Miss World 1978. Before appearing on America's Next Top Model, James studied at Paul Smith's College, studying Hotel Resort Tourism Management.

== Career ==
=== America's Next Top Model ===
In 2012, James was selected to compete on the nineteenth cycle of America's Next Top Model. In the competition she was one of the front-runners, receiving three first call-outs as well as winning three challenges for her scholarship bank. She appeared in the bottom two three times. In Jamaica, James landed in the bottom two with Nastasia after the Dream Come True photoshoot for their weak photographs but in the end, James had the higher score, leaving James to compete alongside fellow contestants Leila Goldkuhl and Kiara Belen in the finale. At the final runway at Rose Hall, James struggled with her runway walk and at panel, James was criticized for her stiff walk, yet praised for her Nine West photo. In the end, James received the highest total average of the three remaining contestants, making her America's Next Top Model. As a result, she was offered modeling contracts with New York Model Management and L.A. Models, she became the face of America's Next Top Model's fragrance Dream Come True, won a spread in Nylon magazine, campaigns with Nine West and Smashbox Cosmetics, and a $100,000 cash prize as well as the $30,000 she earned from her three challenge wins to be used to pay off her college education.

=== Post America's Next Top Model ===
James is signed with New York Model Management and L.A. Models and also had a campaign with Nine West and Smashbox Cosmetics as a part of her prize package. She also became the face of the America's Next Top Model perfume "Dream Come True" and had a cover and a spread in Nylon magazine. On March 28, 2013, she shot a campaign with Guess along with DJ Tiësto and Meghan Von Wiggins for WMag Event. She also appeared in the final episode from the first Boys & Girls cycle with judge and model Rob Evans. She also appeared in the June 2013 issue of Vogue Italia.

She has been an actress in several movies, including The Lost Day, Hello Ladies and Nano, as well as television shows Grandfathered, The Young and the Restless, American Woman, and as Molly Hicks in the series S.W.A.T..

Preceded by Sophie Sumner	America's Next Top Model winner Cycle 19 (2012)	Succeeded by Jourdan Miller
