= Cathy Dove =

American college administrator

10th President of Paul Smith's College
- In office 2014–2020
- Preceded by: John W. Mills
- Succeeded by: Jon Strauss

Personal details
- Education: Georgetown University; Cornell University (MBA); University of Pennsylvania
- Occupation: College administrator

Cathy Dove is an American college administrator who served as the 10th president of Paul Smith's College in New York from 2014 to 2020.

She earned her bachelor's degree at Georgetown University in 1979, an MBA at Cornell University in 1984 and a doctorate in higher education management from the University of Pennsylvania in 2004.

From 1989 to 2014, she was an administrator at Cornell University, most recently serving as vice president of Cornell Tech. She was named as 10th president of Paul Smith's College in 2014 and served in that role until 2020.
