= Framingham High School =

American public high school in Framingham, Massachusetts

Coordinates: 42°19′19.20″N 71°24′17.83″W

- Framingham High School Seal

Location
- 115 A Street; Framingham, Massachusetts 01701; United States

Information
- School type: Public High School
- Established: 1792/1852/1967/1991
- School district: Framingham
- Superintendent: Robert A. Tremblay
- CEEB code: 220842
- Principal: Mark Albright
- Teaching staff: 199.2 (FTE)
- Grades: 9–12
- Age range: 14–18
- Enrollment: 2,534 (2024–2025)
- Student to teacher ratio: 12.7
- Language: English, Spanish & Portuguese
- Campus: Urban/Suburban
- Houses: Gold, Silver, Blue, and Green
- Colors: Navy blue and white
- Athletics conference: Bay State Conference
- Sports: Baseball; basketball; cheerleading; dance; field hockey; gymnastics; hockey; football; lacrosse; softball; soccer; track and field; volleyball; swimming; tennis
- Mascot: Flyer
- Team name: Flyers
- Rival: Natick
- Newspaper: The Eagles Eye
- Yearbook: Philomath
- Website: https://fhs.framingham.k12.ma.us/

Framingham High School (FHS) is a public high school in Framingham, Massachusetts, United States, serving grades 9 through 12. It is located approximately 20 miles (32 km) west of Boston and enrolls about 2,500 students, making it one of the largest high schools in the state.

The school traces its origins to the late 18th century through the Framingham Academy and related institutions. The later Framingham High School was established in 1991 through the merger of Framingham North High School and Framingham South High School.

== History ==
The Framingham Academy was established in 1798, replacing the organization known as the Proprietors of the Brick School House, which had formed in 1792.

The current high school was created when Framingham North High School and Framingham South High School merged in 1991.

The town of Framingham gave the academy $1000, but some time later this was determined to be illegal and the academy was dissolved.

The high school was formed in 1852 and later became the legal successor to the academy. Thus, the high school can be considered to be founded in either 1792 or 1852.

In 1963, due to an increasing school population, the original Framingham High was split into two schools: Framingham North High School and Framingham South High School.

South High was located in the Flagg Drive campus in South Framingham (in the now-demolished Fuller Middle School, which was replaced with a new building at 31 Flagg Drive in 2021) and North High was located at a new school building at Winch Park on A St. in Saxonville.

Originally, North High shared facilities with Winch Park Middle School ("E" & "F" halls in the current building) until 1974 when the first Cameron Middle School opened on Elm Street.

The two high schools remained separate until 1991 when they were merged to create a unified school under the name Framingham High School.

On a visit on October 20, 1994, President Bill Clinton signed the Improving America's Schools Act (IASA) in the school's John F. Kennedy gymnasium.

== Academics ==
In the late 1990s, Framingham High School was identified as an underperforming school. After a series of reforms in the early and mid-2000s, student performance improved, with higher state test scores and increased participation in Advanced Placement courses. In later years, the school performed better on standardized assessments than many districts serving similar student populations. In 2008, Newsweek listed Framingham High among the top 500 high schools in the United States.

The school has also been noted for outcomes among students learning English as a second or foreign language. Many students become proficient in English after several years of instruction, and Framingham reports higher graduation rates and test scores than other districts with large English-learner populations. State law allows families to choose English-only instruction, but few parents of high school students in Framingham select this option.

Framingham High uses a co-teaching approach in many classes, with two teachers working together. The model emphasizes collaboration and has been cited as a factor in the school’s designation as a Commonwealth Compass School.

The school offers a range of programs to support students who need additional help, including mentoring, peer tutoring, academic support services, and an alternative high school campus.

Framingham High School has received several state recognitions, including designation as a Commonwealth Compass School and as a Vanguard Model School by the Massachusetts School Building Authority.

== Demographics ==
According to Massachusetts Department of Elementary and Secondary Education annual statistics, for the 2024-2025 academic year, the demographic enrollment distributions for race, gender and grade level at Framingham High School are as follows:

Total number of enrolled students: 2,534
Total number of full-time equivalent educators: 199.2
Therefore, the student to teacher ratio for this school is 12.7:1

Enrollment by Race/Ethnicity (2024-2025)
Race	Enrolled Pupils*	% of District
African American	175	6.9%
Asian	119	4.7%
Hispanic	1,178	46.5%
Native American	0	0.0%
White	963	38.0%
Native Hawaiian, Pacific Islander	0	0.0%
Multi-Race, Non-Hispanic	96	3.8%
Total	2,534	100%

* Approximate number of enrolled pupils is calculated based on total number of students in district, multiplied by reported percentage, and rounded to nearest whole student.

Enrollment by gender (2024-2025)
Gender	Enrolled pupils	Percentage
Female	1,247	49.21%
Male	1,272	50.2%
Non-binary	15	0.59%
Total	2,534	100%

Enrollment by Grade
Grade	Pupils Enrolled	Percentage
9	736	29.04%
10	649	25.61%
11	602	23.76%
12	546	21.55%
SP*	1	0.04%
Total	2,534	100%

* SP = Special Education Beyond Grade 12

Framingham High School is a racially, ethnically, and economically diverse school due to the town of Framingham historically being a hub for immigrants to the United States.

== Extracurricular activities ==
=== Drama company ===
The Drama Company presents three annual shows, one of which is a one-act play for a statewide festival ran by the Massachusetts Educational Theater Guild.

=== FHS-TV (Home of Flyer News) ===
Framingham High School Television (FHS-TV) began airing its student-run news program, Flyer News, in 1997, broadcasting live to the school each morning at 7:15 a.m. The program expanded in 2005 to air throughout the town.

== Notable alumni ==
- Boris Bede, gridiron football player
- Blake Bellefeuille, professional ice hockey player
- Stan Benjamin (1914–2009), Major League Baseball player and scout
- Andrea Berloff, screenwriter and author of World Trade Center
- David Blatt (born 1959), class of 1977, basketball player and coach, Israel and various European teams, 2012 Olympic coach, former head coach of Cleveland Cavaliers
- Royal L. Bolling, Massachusetts state senator and the school's first African-American class president
- Christian Brigham (Carmelo Hayes), professional wrestler who currently is signed to WWE
- Arthur Raymond Brooks, World War I fighter ace
- Bill Brooks, former NFL football player (1986–1996)
- Sashi Brown, President of the National Football League's Baltimore Ravens
- Michael J. Clouse, record producer and songwriter
- Monique Curnen, actress, notable for portraying Det. Anna Ramirez in The Dark Knight
- Leila Goldkuhl, fashion model, contestant on America's Next Top Model: College Edition
- Rufus Harris, former professional basketball player
- Bill Hunnefield, former MLB player (Chicago White Sox, Cleveland Indians, Boston Braves, New York Giants)
- Lou Merloni, Major League Baseball player, NESN radio talk show host on WEEI 93.7 FM
- Katie Nolan, television sports personality
- Danny O'Connor, professional boxer
- Cyrus Peirce, graduate of Framingham Academy circa 1806 and first head of what is now Framingham State College
- R. J. Brewer ("Hurricane" John Walters), professional wrestler, participated in WWE and Ring of Honor
- Peter Taglianetti, NHL hockey player
- Nancy Travis, actress
- Freedom Williams, musical performer, C+C Music Factory vocalist
