= America's Next Top Model season 19 =

America's Next Top Model
- Season 19
- Judges: Tyra Banks; Kelly Cutrone; Rob Evans
- No. of contestants: 13
- Winner: Laura James
- No. of episodes: 13

Release
- Original network: The CW
- Original release: August 24 – November 16, 2012

Additional information
- Filming dates: June 4 – July 14, 2012

Season chronology
- ← Previous; Season 18 Next → Season 20

The nineteenth cycle of America's Next Top Model (subtitled as America's Next Top Model: College Edition), consisted of thirteen episodes and was broadcast on The CW. It aired from August 24, 2012, until November 16, 2012, and was promoted by the catchphrase "Only One Can Be Top of the Class". This was the final season to feature thirteen contestants. All of the contestants were enrolled in higher education. They competed for the title of America's Next Top Model, providing them with an opportunity to begin their career in the modeling industry. Its premise was originated with model Tyra Banks, who additionally serves as the cycle's executive producer and presenter.

The international destination during the cycle was Ocho Rios, Jamaica, becoming the second occasion in which the series traveled to the country, after cycle 3.

The winner of the competition was 21-year-old Paul Smith's College student Laura James from Cambridge, New York with Kiara Belen placing as the runner up.

== Format changes ==
=== Casting ===
This was the first season to feature a cast of all-new contestants since Cycle 16 (Cycle 17 (All-Stars) featured only returning contestants from previous cycles, while Cycle 18 (British Invasion) featured seven new American contestants alongside seven returning contestants from previous cycles of Britain's Next Top Model). This is also the last season to feature only female contestants until Cycle 23.

=== Judges ===
Judge and fashion photographer Nigel Barker, runway coach Miss J. Alexander and photo shoot creative director Jay Manuel were dismissed from the show after the previous cycle in an attempt to revitalize the show. They were replaced by British model Rob Evans and Filipino fashion blogger Bryanboy. Johnny Wujek also joined the crew as the new creative director of photo shoots. Evans and Bryanboy joined the judging panel with Banks and Cutrone, marking the return of four permanent judges since cycle 12. This cycle did not feature guest judges at panel

=== Public voting ===
Another change was the incorporation of public voting as a factor in eliminations. A 1–10 scoring system was implemented to determine the merits of each contestant's performances at challenges and photo shoots, and the results for each week were calculated on a 50-point scale, with a maximum possible score of 10 from each of the three judges (Banks, Cutrone and Evans) and for each challenge and a maximum possible average social media score of 10.0. Each week, the girl with the lowest combined score was eliminated from the competition.

=== Comeback series ===
The eliminated contestants still participated in every photo shoot (including those taking place after the comeback competition was finished), and their photos were also still available to be voted on by the public. This separate competition was documented on the "Comeback series", which was untelevised and instead shown on The CW's official website. It lasted for six weeks, and the winning contestant, with the highest average social media score throughout the cycle (Leila Goldkuhl), was allowed to rejoin the main competition.

== Prizes ==
The prizes for this cycle were a modeling contract with LA Models and NY Model Management, a position the face of the America's Next Top Model fragrance Dream Come True, a fashion spread in Nylon magazine, campaigns with Nine West and Smashbox cosmetics and a $100,000 cash prize. The following prizes were removed: A position as guest correspondent for Extra, a fashion spread in Vogue Italia, a cover of and fashion spread in Beauty In Vogue, a single produced and released by CBS Records and a US$100,000 contract with CoverGirl cosmetics, the series' long-time sponsor.

== Contestants ==
The cast includes Laura James, who is the daughter of Dynasty actor John James.

(ages stated are at start of contest)

Contestant	Age	Height	Hometown	University/College	Outcome	Place
Jessie Rabideau	23	5 ft 9.75 in (1.77 m)	Speedway, Indiana	University of Southern California	Episode 2	13
Maria Tucker	22	5 ft 7.25 in (1.71 m)	Las Cruces, New Mexico	Harvard University	Episode 3	12 (quit)
Darian Ellis	22	5 ft 9 in (1.75 m)	Baton Rouge, Louisiana	Louisiana State University	Episode 3	11
Destiny Strudwick	18	5 ft 8.5 in (1.74 m)	Columbus, Ohio	Aveda Institute Columbus	Episode 4	10
Yvonne Powless	20	5 ft 8.5 in (1.74 m)	Minneapolis, Minnesota	University of Texas at Austin	Episode 6	9
Allyssa Vuelma	20	5 ft 10.5 in (1.79 m)	Fort Lauderdale, Florida	Florida State University	Episode 7	8
Brittany Brown	18	5 ft 10 in (1.78 m)	Gilbert, Arizona	Chandler–Gilbert Community College	Episode 8	7
Victoria Henley	18	5 ft 9 in (1.75 m)	Colquitt, Georgia	Liberty University	Episode 9	6
Kristin Kagay	19	5 ft 7.25 in (1.71 m)	Jacksonville, Florida	Florida State College at Jacksonville	Episode 10	5
Nastasia Scott	19	5 ft 8.25 in (1.73 m)	East Stroudsburg, Pennsylvania	East Stroudsburg University	Episode 11	4
Leila Goldkuhl	20	6 ft 0 in (1.83 m)	Framingham, Massachusetts	University of Rhode Island	Episode 12	3
Kiara Belen	22	5 ft 9 in (1.75 m)	New Jersey	University of California, Irvine	Episode 12	2
Laura James	21	6 ft 0 in (1.83 m)	Cambridge, New York	Paul Smith's College	Episode 12	1

== Episodes ==
No episode aired on October 12 due to the network's re-airing of the pilot episode of Arrow.

No. overall	No. in season	Title	Original release date	US viewers (millions)
226	1	"The Girl Who Makes the Grade"	August 24, 2012	1.09
The contestants meet for the first time, and enjoy a party for the casting of cycle 19. Tyra introduces the new judges for the cycle: Rob Evans and photo shoot director Johnny Wujek. She also reveals that the fans will take part in deciding who will be eliminated each week. The contestants are introduced to the public via runway, and later have a photo shoot in their bikinis. They then meet the judges for one-on-one interviews at panel. Memorable contestants include Victoria, who has been home schooled her entire life, Brittany who loves Disney, Laura is the daughter of actor and Dynasty star John James, Jessie who accidentally flashes her booty during the runway challenge, and Kristin, who is a former mean girl in high-school. Tyra later reveals the top thirteen contestants who will compete and live together in the Top Model house.: Special guests: Taryn Manning
227	2	"The Girl Who Cries Home"	August 31, 2012	1.07
After the contestants settle into their new sorority house, Tyra reveals the new twists and changes in the cycle. The following day, Rob Evans informs the contestants that they will be taking part in a runway show at Club Even in Hollywood for their first challenge. Several of the contestants stumble. Brittany, Victoria and Yvonne manage to do well. Ultimately, Yvonne is chosen as the winner of the challenge. At the photo shoot, the contestants must get their beauty shots taken in a shoot inspired by taxidermy. Leila, Nastasia and Laura receive good feedback. Jessie and Destiny struggle, and Kristin is critiqued for her attitude and persistent complaining. Victoria amazes Johnny with her personality, though he feels annoyed by incessant talking. Back at the house, a worried Victoria calls her mother and bursts into tears. At panel, Leila, Laura and Nastasia receive positive critique from both the judges and the social media. Kristin impresses the fans, achieving the highest social media score. Brittany is shocked when she learns that fans online see her as being arrogant and 'full of herself'. The rest of the models receive mixed feedback. Leila receives best picture after being scored of all tens. Destiny and Jessie find themselves in the bottom two, both for having the lowest scores and for their plain photographs. After the final scores are revealed, Jessie is sent home from the competition.: Featured photographer: Shenae Grimes; Special guests: Iota Phi Theta step team, Jonte', P'Trique
228	3	"The Girl Who Wants Out"	September 7, 2012	1.49
The contestants are taken to the Cristophe Salon, where they are greeted by the judges. They reveal that it is makeover time, but that there will be a few twists. Maria and Victoria refuse their makeovers, while everyone else says yes. Most of the contestants are satisfied with their changes. Tyra drops by during the makeover shoot and has a talk with Victoria. Meanwhile, Kelly confronts Maria. Both are shown what their makeovers would have been. Victoria appears remorseful over her decision. Destiny, who receives one of the more dramatic makeovers, fears that her new style will make her look like a lesbian. For the main photo shoot, the contestants are asked to pose nude with Rob Evans, displaying their chemistry with him. Maria refuses to do the photo shoot, citing that she has been doubting herself ever since she began the competition. After speaking with Johnny during hair and make-up, she decides to quit the competition, much to the relief of some of the other contestants. Darian, Kiara and Kristin struggle, while Nastasia accidentally knees Rob in the groin. Brittany, Laura, Leila and Victoria are all praised during their sessions. At judging, Brittany, Victoria, Leila and Allyssa receive praise from the judges and social media. Victoria apologizes to the judges for her decision regarding the makeover, and admits that ever since, she has tried to curl her hair herself in an attempt to mimic what her original makeover would have been. Victoria is awarded best picture during elimination. Yvonne and Darian land in the bottom two. Despite an extremely close tie between the two, Yvonne is saved for having a higher public vote, and Darian is sent home.: Featured photographer: Tony Duran; Special guests: Cristophe, P'Trique
229	4	"The Girl Who Does What Tyler Perry Says"	September 14, 2012	1.41
Tensions flare when Kristin goes through Destiny's bag to get a lighter without asking for her permission. The contestants later meet Tyler Perry at 3rd Street in Santa Monica Boulevard for an acting challenge split into four groups into uneven number of teams. where Tyra and Tyler will tell the contestants what to do while they portray a persona they've been randomly assigned. Destiny and Leila struggle, while Victoria angers a tourist to the point that he throws food at her. Kiara, Laura and Yvonne do the best job. Kiara wins the challenge, and is given the opportunity to star in a role in one of Tyler Perry's newest productions. Later they are whisked away to Universal Studios Hollywood, where they are dressed up as zombies for an apocalyptic photo shoot. Laura, Leila and Brittany shine, while Yvonne and Destiny struggle. Kiara is critiqued for looking like a video girl, and Kristin irritates Johnny with her attitude. She also struggles to get a good shot. At panel, Kristin receives low scores from the judges. Nastasia is castigated for looking short in her photo. Laura receives the highest fan vote in the competition thus far. She also receives the highest possible score from the judges, and later receives best photo as a result. Destiny and Yvonne are once again placed in the bottom two, both for having delivered lackluster photos. Yvonne is saved in the end, and Destiny is sent home from the competition.: Featured photographer: Ricky Middlesworth; Special guests: Tyler Perry
230	5	"The Girl Who Sings for Alicia Keys"	September 21, 2012	1.32
For having received best photo the previous episode, Laura is allowed to sleep in the Tyra suite along with a guest of her choosing. She chooses Kristin to join her, and talks about how Leila might be mad at her for having chosen Kristin instead of her. Tyra and Alicia Keys later show up and tell the contestants that they will wearing clothes designed by Mara Hoffman for a runway show as part of Alicia Keys' charity "Keep a Child Alive". Laura is chosen as the leader of the challenge, due to her first call-out. The winner of the challenge will be decided by the audience, who will cast votes on their favorite dresses. Backstage during the runway show, Kelly questions Laura about the direction she is giving the contestants. After the challenge concludes, Kiara, Laura and Victoria receive the highest bids. Kiara wins the challenge and chooses Nastasia to accompany her in an Alicia Keys concert. Back at the house, Allyssa is revealed to have received the lowest score for the challenge. Kiara tells Leila that Laura has said that she is obsessed with her. Leila proceeds to confront Laura, and tells her that she is obsessed with herself. As multiple contestants begin to step into the room, a fight quickly ensues among the rest of the contestants. At the photo shoot, Jonte' teaches the contestants about posing while being tossed in the air as a cheerleader. Kristin, Nastasia and Victoria are praised, while Allyssa, Brittany and Leila struggle. Laura, who is afraid of heights, conquers her fears to get a good picture. At panel, most of the contestants receive mixed feedback. Laura is praised for her great shot and for having pushed through her fears. After the scores are combined, it is Nastasia who receives best photo. Leila and Brittany shockingly find themselves in the bottom two, much to the surprise of the contestants and the judges. Despite a low fan and challenge score, Brittany manages to survive the elimination by a margin of 0.5 to Leila, who is eliminated despite her consistently high fan score, leaving her feeling extremely emotional.: Featured photographer: Sarah Silver; Special guests: Alicia Keys, Mara Hoffman, Jonte'
231	6	"The Girl Who Gets Pwn'd"	September 28, 2012	0.96
After the shocking elimination of Leila, most of the contestants stepped up their game, while both Brittany and Yvonne got irritated with Bryanboy's reaction to Leila's elimination. The contestants then go to The Culver Studios where they were greeted by a video game version of Rob Evans and supermodel Chrissy Teigen, they announce that they will act a video game scene. Brittany and Kristin did well while Yvonne did not look like she want to do the challenge and although Victoria's character was praised, her body postures are the worries of the judges. Laura impressed them the most and she won the challenge which is a signature winning move that will be featured in the video game, Uncharted 3: Drake's Deception. Back at the house Victoria was worried about her position in the competition so she had an emotional conversation with her mother. For the photo shoot, the contestants are styled in a Steampunk fashion in a train station where they will pose with an owl named Groovy from Harry Potter movies. Brittany asked Bryanboy about his reaction during the last panel and later clear things out with him and she received good feedback. Laura also delivered beautifully, Kristin had some problems posing with the owl and struggled to get a shot, Victoria struggled also although she implemented a long background story for her shoot, and on Yvonne's shoot where they have to change her skirt, Yvonne made a tongue noise which made Bryanboy scold Yvonne who fights back at him. After the tension, Yvonne then later apologized to Bryanboy. At panel, Laura swept the victory as she got a perfect score from the judges and high score on both social media and challenge. Brittany excelled despite Kelly's remark about her Disney persona, Nastasia was again castigated for looking short in a photo. Victoria landed in the bottom two for slowly sliding down the competition with Yvonne who was eliminated for an average photo and a bad attitude on set.: Featured photographer: Mike Ruiz
232	7	"The Girl Who Licks the Floor"	October 5, 2012	1.11
Most of the contestants are worried about Victoria's health, as she did not eat a lot. According to Victoria, she wasn't eating as much because she missed her mom. Bryanboy told the contestants that they would go on a road trip for their challenge, Divided into two teams. Each team had three stops on their way to Palm Springs, and each contestant had to photograph themselves committing 'Random Acts of Modelling' at every stop. Most of the contestants struggled to create the required shots. Victoria accidentally did not save one of Kiara's segments, which irritated her. Laura ultimately won the challenge, and as her prize she won the opportunity to have a segment as a host in Nylon TV. After their long drive, the contestants did a photo shoot where they had to pose in gross and sticky situations. Brittany, Kristin and Nastasia were praised, while Allyssa, Kiara and Laura struggled. Meanwhile, Victoria made up yet another back story for her shoot. When they returned to their sorority house, the contestants were concerned about Victoria's health and confronted her for it. At panel, Brittany, Kristin and Nastasia were praised. Even though Victoria's photo was stellar, Tyra asked the contestants about her condition in the competition, and about their worries that Victoria had been losing weight. During the elimination ceremony, Nastasia received the best photo. Tyra warned Victoria that if she restricted her food intake, she would have to go home. Allyssa and Laura were placed in the bottom two for their weak shots. Tyra handed the last photo to Laura, and emotionally eliminated Allyssa.: Featured photographer: Douglas Friedman; Special guests: Marissa Montgomery, Marvin Scott Jarrett
233	8	"The Girl Who Comes Back"	October 19, 2012	1.47
The contestants meet with Kelly and went on go-sees for the challenge with some of the biggest designers in Los Angeles, the designers can only book one model but the models can book more than one designers. Victoria tried to impress Whitney Port and tries to outshines Kiara as her partner, Laura broke down as she wants to go to Guess but has a little time to go, but she then won the challenge while Brittany and Victoria did not book any. For their photo shoot, the contestants had "fashion mugshots" taken at a prison which is also a message for young college students. Kristin and Laura excel, while Brittany struggles with her character. Nastasia and Victoria get into their characters, while Kiara shares her experience in a prison when she tried to steal a bracelet. At panel, Laura received the highest score of the week for the third time, while Brittany received the lowest and was the seventh contestant eliminated. After Brittany's elimination, the six previously-eliminated contestants (except Maria), who had taken part in all of the previous photo shoots, filed into the judging room for the results of the "comeback" competition. The episode ended on a cliffhanger, with the results being revealed the following episode.: Featured photographer: Mark "The Cobra Snake" Hunter; Special guests: Markus Barrington, Lulu Guinness, Sarah Boyer, Charlotte Ronson, Whitney Port, Cecilia Cassini, P'Trique
234	9	"The Girls Go to Jamaica"	October 26, 2012	1.14
Concluded from the previous episode, Tyra announced the contestants that they would be going to Jamaica for the remainder of the competition. The scores for comeback series was revealed, Leila was named as the contestant with the highest average fan vote score out of the seven eliminated contestants, meaning she was reinstated into the contest. When the contestants arrived in Jamaica, they were greeted by some local male models, Kiara clicked with Cory and flirted with him. Then the contestants had some lunch with Tyra where she taught the ladies the type of models they were, whether they were a smizer or a toocher. Then they met Jonti' and Konshens where they announced that their challenge was a dance competition with the moods of dancehall routines in terms of partners. Kiara and Nastasia received good feedback, Leila and Victoria did pretty well, while Kristin and Laura received the lowest scores, which angered Kristin. Kiara and Nastasia won; their prize was over US$3,000 worth of jewelry from Peace-is of Bianca. For the photo shoot, the contestants created a love triangle scene, with Rob Evans and other male models as featured extras. At panel, Nastasia received first call-out for her beautiful photo, while Laura followed suit, Leila also received a mixed comments with Tyra saying that her picture was a bit catalog, Kristin was castigated for not trying to do her best. Ultimately, Kiara and Victoria landed in the bottom two for their flawed photos. With little over a point apart, Victoria, one of the most controversial contestants of the season, was eliminated from the competition.: Featured photographer: William Richards; Special guests: Konshens, Jonte'
235	10	"The Girl Who Becomes Art For Tyra"	November 2, 2012	1.26
For the challenge, the contestants met Cedella Marley (daughter of singers Bob and Rita Marley) to model them in bikinis while rising out of the ocean on a dolphin. Leila won and received a House of Marley package worth over US$3,000 and a spa treatment courtesy of Half Moon resort. For the photo shoot, photographed by Tyra Banks, the contestants portrayed warriors at Dunn's River Falls. The models were transformed into warrior princesses, and they had to embody different themes of nature. At panel, Leila receive high acclaim for her ultra stunning photograph and once again rewarded by three perfect scores by the judges. Kiara and Nastasia also received acclaim for their photographs and received near perfect scores as well. Both Laura and Kristin received mediocre feedback, disgusted the latter even more. Backstage, when they were waiting for the results, an angered and disgusted Kristin finally had enough and threw a tantrum to Kiara and Leila who were celebrating their high scores, especially for Kiara since it is the first time she had such score. Kiara thought it's perfectly fine to celebrate, but Kristin thought it was simply disrespectful, though the latter did disrespectfully cut off every time Leila wants to speak. At last, Leila easily got the best photo and earned the best score ever in the competition at 46.4, breaking Laura's record in week four with the score of 46.2. Kiara then honored by Tyra when she revealed that her shot is going to grace the walls of Tyra's home. Nastasia then also called safe, leaving Laura and the even more disgusted Kristin in the bottom two. Laura easily escaped the elimination again, leaving a shocked but still disgusted Kristin kicked out of the competition. Kristin then talks about how she's happy that she's leaving the competition since she's so disgusted with everyone else in the house.: Featured photographer: Tyra Banks; Special guests: Cedella Marley, P'Trique
236	11	"The Girl Who Freaks Out on Horseback"	November 9, 2012	1.41
The contestants are challenged to shoot a trial television commercial for the Jamaica Tourist Board, including writing their own script and starring in their own television spot while horseback riding in the ocean. The winner gets to come back to Jamaica to shoot an official television spot that would be broadcast worldwide. Kiara and Laura struggled to work with the horse but manage to pull it through while Leila became frightened with the horse which made her struggle and Nastasia forgot all her lines which made her struggle as well, but it was Kiara who was chosen as the winner for having the highest score while Nastasia got the lowest, making her worry. Then the models change bikinis for the Dream Come True perfume photo shoot where they pose for the chance to appear in the official fragrance ad. At the photo shoot, Nastasia, Leila and Laura struggled while Kiara wowed the photographer. At panel, Kiara wowed the judges and ultimately earned a best photo and followed by Leila, leaving Laura and Nastasia in the bottom two with Laura for having a weak photograph again and Nastasia for slipping fast in the competition, but in the end, Nastasia was eliminated after having 0.3 score lower than Laura.: Featured photographer: Jez Smith; Special guests: Ben Bennett, Yendi Phillips, P'Trique
237	12	"The Girl Who Becomes America's Next Top Model"	November 16, 2012	1.36
The episode begins with the final runway show segment, which takes place at the most famous – yet infamous – property in all of Jamaica, the mysteriously haunted Rose Hall in Montego Bay. Before the show begins, Tyra leads over to flashback scenes of the final two photo shoots of the competition. For the first photo shoot, Kelly meets the models in the streets of Jamaica to mentor them through their official Nine West photo shoot, where she and photographer Jez Smith butt heads during one of the sessions. Then, the contestants pose in Half Moon Bay for their Nylon magazine photo shoot, after which they are surprised with visits from their relatives. The scenes cut back to the runway show, where the previously eliminated contestants (except Maria) return to join the finalists and their families for an unprecedented runway show that embraces all the beauty, culture, history and music of the island. During the show, Kiara and Laura deliver strong performances. Leila fails to impress, falling twice in front of the judges and the audience. At panel, the top three contestants are judged. Kiara's Nine West photo is criticized, but her runway walk receives praise. Laura is praised for her photograph, and receives good comments for her walk, while Leila is heavily criticized for her walk but receives the best feedback for her photo. Tyra announces that the judges will grade each contestants' overall body of work, adding the combined averages of their challenge scores and the combined average of their social media scores. After the final scores are added, the girls are called back. Tyra first announces that Leila is eliminated. Kiara soon follows, and Laura is revealed to be the nineteenth winner of America's Next Top Model.: Featured photographers: Jez Smith, Jimmy Fontaine; Special guests: Sophie Sumner, Lori Taylor, DJ Crazy Neil, J. Errico
238	13	"The Girl With the Best Top Model Freakout"	November 16, 2012	0.77
This episode recaps the previous episodes of the cycle, running through the challenges, photo shoots and dramatic moments along with never-before-seen footage. Previously unaired footage includes the continuation of Kiara and Darian's brawling moments, Kiara's confrontation of Laura about Leila being obsessed with her and the involvement of the other girls, Maria's decision to withdraw from the competition, Victoria and her awkward intimacy with men during their stay in Jamaica, Leila's freak out while horseback riding, the continuation of Jez Smith's and Kelly Cutrone's fighting moments during Laura's Nine West photo shoot session, and Tyra's re-enactment of her screaming match with Tiffany Richardson from cycle 4.

== Comeback series ==
For this cycle, America's Next Top Model launched a web-series called The Comeback Series. After being eliminated, the girls continued to participate in the photo shoots under the premise that the audience would select one of them to return to the competition later. Leila returned to the competition in episode 9 for having accumulated the highest average fan score for her photographs.

Nº	Model	Public vote average
7	Destiny	4.53
6	Darian	4.64
5	Yvonne	4.76
4	Jessie	5.04
3	Brittany	5.41
2	Allyssa	5.44
1	Leila	5.84

== Summaries ==
=== Results ===
Order	Episodes											
Order	1 (Note: In episode 1, the pool of 30 semi-finalists was reduced to the final 13.)	2	3 (Note: In episode 3, Maria quit the competition during the photo shoot.)	4	5	6	7	8	9 (Note: At the end of episode 8, the eliminated girls were brought back into the elimination room after Brittany's elimination, then at the beginning of episode 9, Leila returned to the competition as a result of having received the highest average social media score.)	10	11	12
1	Kristin	Leila	Victoria	Laura	Nastasia	Laura	Nastasia	Laura	Nastasia	Leila	Kiara	Laura
2	Nastasia	Nastasia	Brittany	Leila	Laura	Brittany	Brittany	Kristin	Laura	Kiara	Leila	Kiara
3	Laura	Brittany	Allyssa	Brittany	Kristin	Allyssa	Kristin	Kiara	Leila	Nastasia	Laura	Leila
4	Allyssa	Laura	Leila	Allyssa	Kiara	Kristin	Victoria	Nastasia	Kristin	Laura	Nastasia	
5	Destiny	Kristin	Laura	Kiara	Victoria	Kiara	Kiara	Victoria	Kiara	Kristin		
6	Kiara	Kiara	Nastasia	Nastasia	Yvonne	Nastasia	Laura	Brittany	Victoria			
7	Leila	Yvonne	Kristin	Victoria	Allyssa	Victoria	Allyssa					
8	Darian	Allyssa	Destiny	Kristin	Brittany	Yvonne						
9	Maria	Victoria	Kiara	Yvonne	Leila							
10	Jessie	Darian	Yvonne	Destiny								
11	Brittany	Maria	Darian									
12	Yvonne	Destiny	Maria									
13	Victoria	Jessie										

The contestant won the challenge
The contestant was eliminated
The contestant failed to return to the competition
The contestant returned to the competition
The contestant won the competition
The contestant quit the competition

=== Bottom two ===
Episode	Contestants			Eliminated
2	Destiny	&	Jessie	Jessie
3	Darian	&	Yvonne	Darian
4	Destiny	&	Yvonne	Destiny
5	Brittany	&	Leila	Leila
6	Victoria	&	Yvonne	Yvonne
7	Allyssa	&	Laura	Allyssa
8	Brittany	&	Victoria	Brittany
9	Kiara	&	Victoria	Victoria
10	Kristin	&	Laura	Kristin
11	Laura	&	Nastasia	Nastasia
15	Laura	Kiara	Leila	Leila
15	Laura	&	Kiara	Kiara

The contestant was eliminated after their first time in the bottom two
The contestant was eliminated after their second time in the bottom two
The contestant was eliminated after their third time in the bottom two
The contestant was eliminated in the final judging and placed third.
The contestant was eliminated in the final judging and placed second.

=== Average call-out order ===
Casting call-out order and final three are not included.

Rank by average	Place	Model	Call-out total	Number of call-outs	Call-out average
1	1	Laura	29	10	2.90
2	3	Leila	22	7	3.14
3	4	Nastasia	34	10	3.40
4	7	Brittany	26	7	3.71
5	2	Kiara	45	10	4.50
6	5	Kristin	41	9	4.56
7	8	Allyssa	32	6	5.33
8	6	Victoria	44	8	5.50
9	9	Yvonne	40	5	8.00
10	10	Destiny	30	3	10.00
11	11	Darian	21	2	10.50
12	12	Maria	11	1	11.00
13	13	Jessie	13	1	13.00

=== Scoring chart ===
Place	Model	Episodes											Total score (Note: There was no challenge in episode 3, so the maximum possible score that week was 40.0, instead of the usual 50.0. As a result of this, to calculate each girl's total score and average, the scores for episode 3 have been multiplied by 1.25.)	Average
Place	Model	2	3 (Note: Yvonne and Darian's scores are the same, due to rounding. Yvonne's unrounded score is 20.81 and Darian's is 20.78.)	4	5	6	7	8	9	10	11	12	Total score	Average
1	Laura	36.0	32.0	42.5	38.7	46.2	32.9	41.0	38.9	35.9	35.8	41.2	429.1	39.0
2	Kiara	34.3	24.1	32.7	37.3	32.8	35.9	34.8	32.5	42.2	39.0	36.6	388.2	35.3
3	Leila	40.4	32.2	37.3	29.0				34.9 (Note: Leila returned to the competition in episode 9.)	46.4	37.1	35.2	300.6	37.6
4	Nastasia	36.6	28.1	32.4	40.9	31.8	42.2	33.3	39.3	40.3	35.5		367.4	36.7
5	Kristin	34.7	27.9	30.9	38.1	33.9	38.1	35.8	33.3	34.0			313.7	34.9
6	Victoria	31.2	34.2	31.2	36.5	31.7	36.7	32.6	31.3				274.0	34.2
7	Brittany	36.3	33.9	37.3	29.5	39.1	39.2	30.3					254.1	36.3
8	Allyssa	32.1	32.9	35.5	30.8	35.7	29.0						204.2	34.0
9	Yvonne	33.8	20.8	29.5	36.4	30.5							156.2	31.2
10	Destiny	26.9	25.1	27.0									85.3	28.4
11	Darian	28.9	20.8										54.9	27.5
12	Maria	28.1	Quit										28.1	28.1
13	Jessie	22.4											22.4	22.4

Indicates the contestant won the competition.
The contestant received the highest score of the week
The contestant was eliminated
The contestant was in the bottom two
The contestant quit the competition

=== Photo shoot guide ===
- Episode 1 photo shoot: Posing in bikinis (casting)
- Episode 2 photo shoot: Taxidermy mounted head beauty shots
- Episode 3 photo shoot: Black and white nude in a garden with Rob Evans
- Episode 4 photo shoot: Apocalyptic zombies
- Episode 5 photo shoot: Cheerleaders in the air
- Episode 6 photo shoot: Steampunk fashion with an owl on a train
- Episode 7 photo shoot: Gross and sticky situations in a motel
- Episode 8 photo shoot: Prison mugshots
- Episode 9 photo shoot: River raft love triangle
- Episode 10 photo shoot: Waterfall warriors
- Episode 11 photo shoot: Dream Come True fragrance in a beach
- Episode 12 photo shoots: Nine West advertisements; Nylon Magazine spreads

=== Makeovers ===
- Maria – Refused makeover (planned for curly layered hair with highlights)
- Darian – Long layered brown weave
- Destiny – Cut short with caramel highlights
- Yvonne – Long black extensions
- Allyssa – Trimmed and dyed darker
- Brittany – Bob cut and dyed light red
- Victoria – Refused makeover (planned for red, long, curly extensions)
- Kristin – Shoulder length cut with bangs
- Nastasia – Volumized curls with blonde highlights
- Leila – Dyed brown with blonde highlights
- Kiara – Long straight black weave with fixed eyebrows
- Laura – Trimmed and dyed ice blonde with bleached eyebrows
