= Paul Smith's College =

Private college in New York

Coordinates: 44°26′06″N 74°15′08″W

- Motto: "It's about the experience"
- Type: Private college
- Established: 1946; 80 years ago
- Budget: $41.6 million (2023)
- President: Dan Kelting
- Faculty: 59 FT/ 10 PT (2023)
- Students: 597 (2023)
- Undergraduates: 582 (2023)
- Postgraduates: 15 (2023)
- Location: Paul Smiths, (near Brighton, Franklin County), New York, United States
- Campus: Rural, 14,200 acres (5,700 ha)
- Colors: Green & white
- Sporting affiliations: Yankee Small College Conference, United States Collegiate Athletic Association (USCAA)
- Mascot: Bobcat
- Website: www.paulsmiths.edu

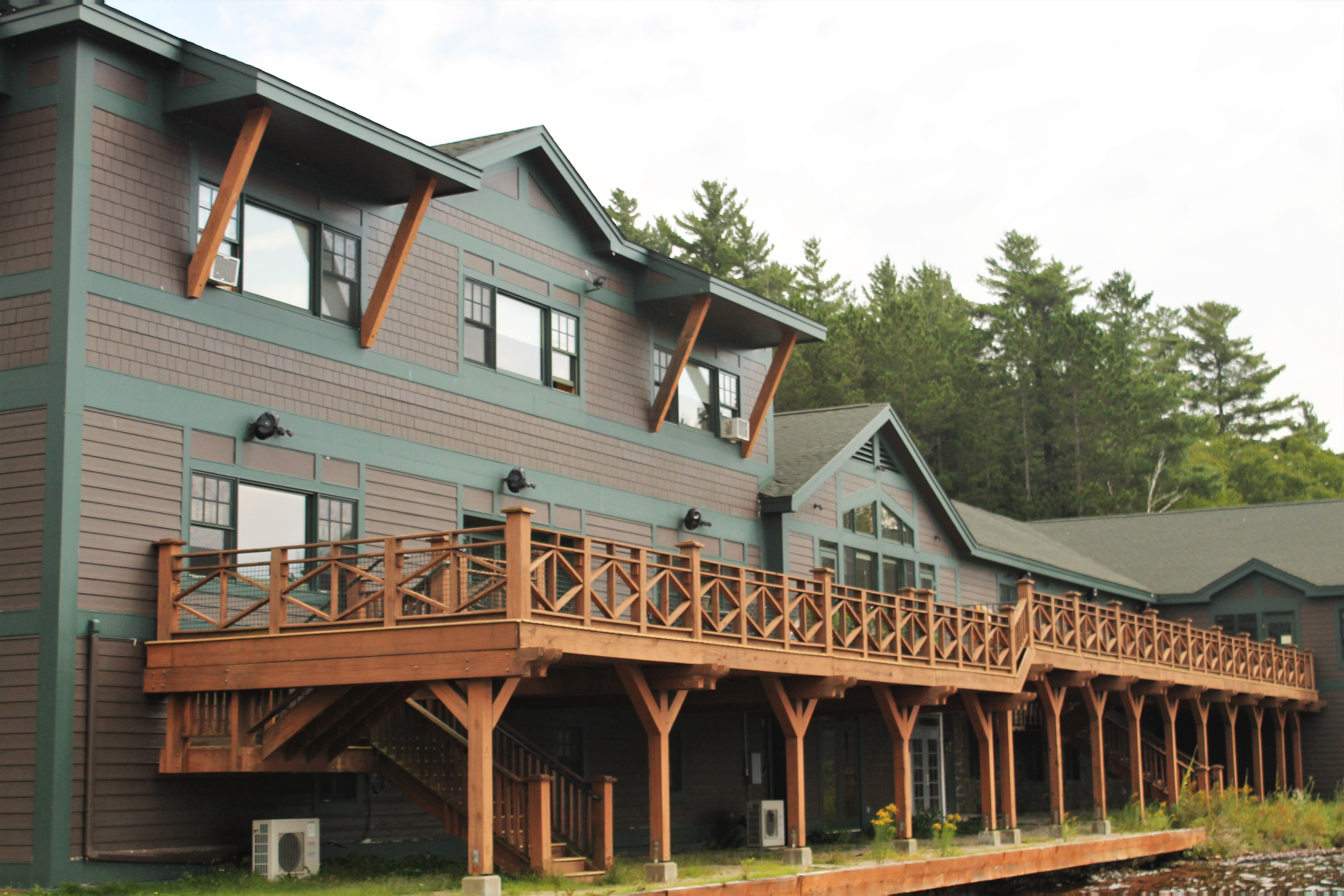
Paul Smith's College, Joan Weill Student Center

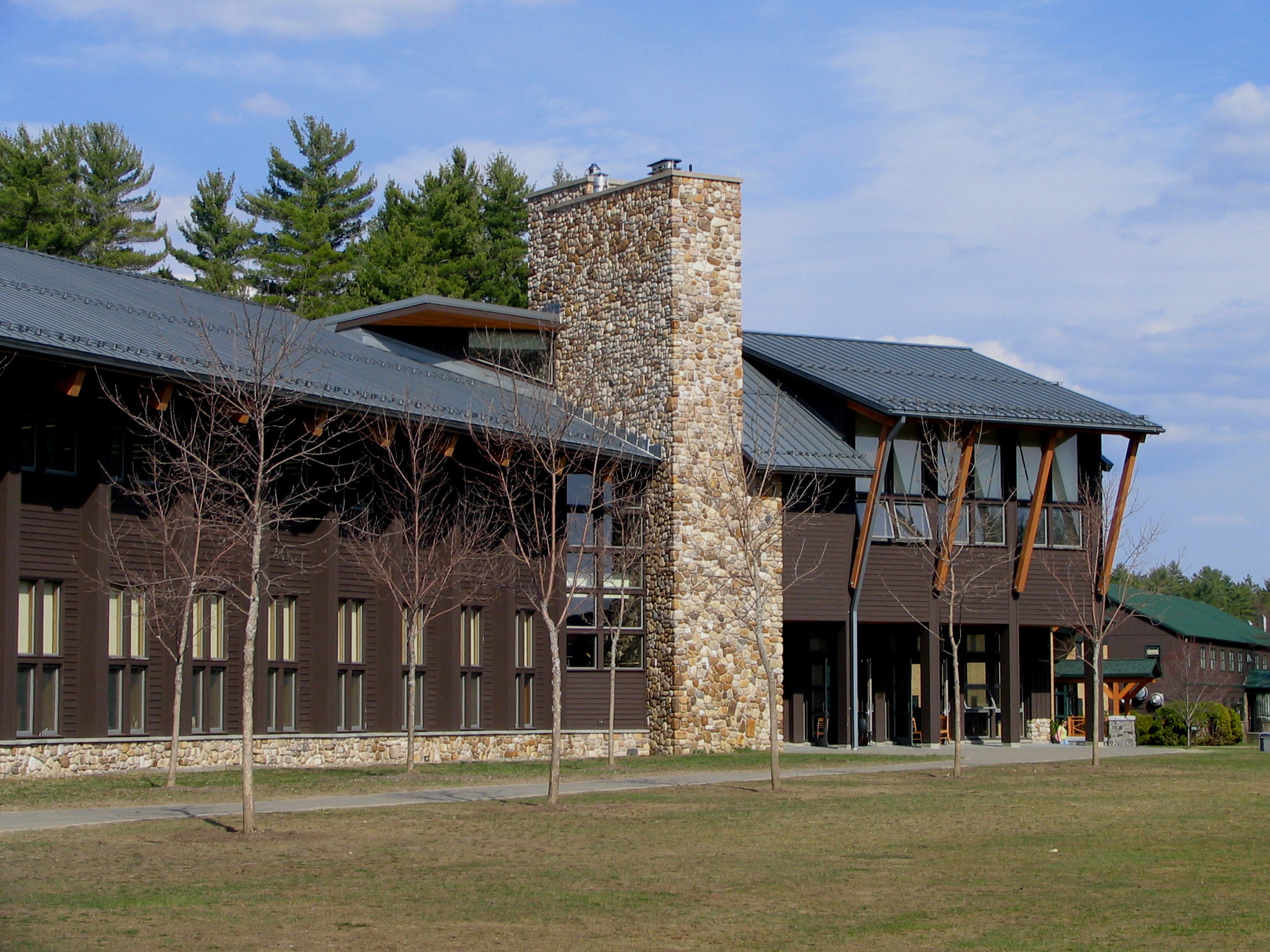
The Joan Weill Adirondack Library, at Paul Smith's College in Paul Smiths, New York

Paul Smith's College is a private college in the hamlet/village of Paul Smiths, in the town of Brighton, Franklin County, New York, in the Adirondack Mountains.

Established in 1946, Paul Smith's College offers academic degrees of Associate, Bachelor of Arts, and Master of Arts. Its 14,000-acre campus is one of the largest college campuses in the world. As of 2023, approximately 600 students attend each year.

== History ==
Paul Smith's College was founded through a bequest of Phelps Smith, son of Paul Smith's Hotel founder Apollos ("Paul") Smith (1825–1912). Along with the money to start the college, Phelps also left more than an additional bequest of 20,000 acres (8,100 ha) of land. Paul Smith's is located northwest of Saranac Lake, in the hamlet of Paul Smiths in the Town of Brighton, in Franklin County, New York. Although the donation of money and surrounding land for the college was made in 1937, the college would not officially open until nine years later in 1946, when the first class of 150 students entered to study forestry and resort management.

In 2015, Joan H. Mosher Weill, wife of Sanford I. "Sandy" Weill, a banker, financier, philanthropist and chairman of Citicorp bank in New York City, offered a $20 million donation on the condition that the institution change its name to Joan Weill-Paul Smith's College. Ms. Weill was a former trustee of the college. This change however would have violated Phelps Smith's founding bequest, which required that the school be "forever known" as Paul Smith's College of Arts and Sciences. Justice John T. Ellis of the New York State Supreme Court later ruled that the college could not be renamed, and the proposed donation was withdrawn.

In 2023, the college proposed a merger with the Fedcap Rehabilitation Services (Fedcap), a Manhattan-based non-profit in New York City that provides vocational education to those who have disabilities that affect their ability to find employment, but that proposal was later shelved.

In 2024, the dining hall at Paul Smith's College was renamed Morehouse Hall in honor of Stephen Warren Morehouse (1840–1882), an early employee of the Paul Smith's Hotel and American Civil War (1861–1865) veteran of the Union Army who served in the 54th Massachusetts Infantry Regiment of some of the first Black/African American soldiers.

== Academics ==
Classroom space is primarily located at Pickett Hall, Cantwell Hall, and Freer Science Hall. Auxiliary areas include The Joan Weill Adirondack Library, the campus' sawmill, the Saunders Sports Complex, the Joan Weill Student Center and the Paul Smith's College VIC. Two on-campus restaurants, the Ganzi: Palm Training Restaurant and the A.P. Smith's Bakery, are staffed by students and open to the public.

Paul Smith's Fall 2021 acceptance rate was 75%. In the 2024 rankings for the Regional Colleges North category by U.S. News & World Report, the college was ranked 25 out of 52 schools.

== Campus life ==
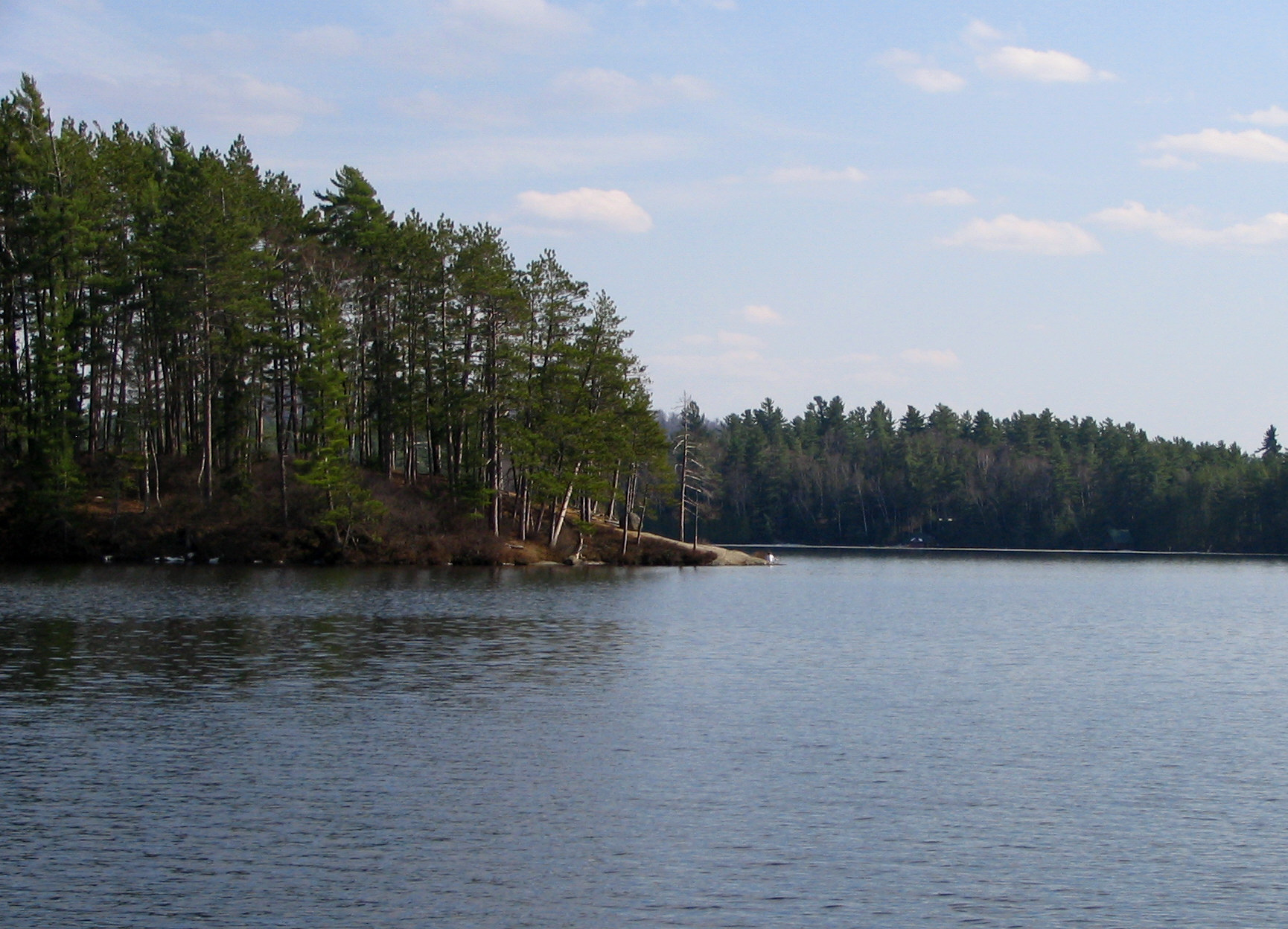
Lower St. Regis Lake from the college

Most of the college population lives on campus. Residence halls are divided by class. Freshmen halls include Lydia Martin Smith Hall, Currier Hall, and Lakeside Hall. Incoming transfer students are housed in Franklin Hall. Upperclassmen share Essex, Clinton, Lambert, Blum House, Overlook, Saratoga, Alumni, Upper St. Regis, Lower St. Regis, and Hillside halls. Overlook Hall was opened in 2011 as a LEED-certified "green" dorm for upper-classmen.

Paul Smith's rural location lends itself to many campus-based activities. Student-directed clubs administered under the Office of Student Activities include fishing and hunting, Adventure Sports Club, Society for Ecological Restoration, Society of American Foresters, the Wildlife Society, Student Government Association, InterVarsity Christian Fellowship, PSC Snowcats, Anime and Gaming club, Fish and Game Club, and Adirondack Mycology club, among others.

The campus is located on Lower St. Regis Lake. Students have a beach, as well as docks and storage for canoes and kayaks.

The Lakeside Dining Hall is operated by Sodexo. Both the A.P. Smith's Bakery and The Ganzi: Palm Training Restaurant in Cantwell Hall opens a few days a week each semester to sell student-produced products.

== Athletics ==
Paul Smith's athletic teams are the Bobcats, but were formerly called the Falcons. The college is a member of the United States Collegiate Athletic Association, primarily competing in the Yankee Small College Conference since the 2010–11 academic year. The Bobcats previously competed in the Sunrise Athletic Conference of the National Association of Intercollegiate Athletics from 2002–03 to 2009–10.

Paul Smith's competes in 16 different sports: Men's sports include basketball, cross country, ice hockey, rugby and soccer; while women's sports include basketball, cross country, ice hockey, rugby, soccer and volleyball; and co-ed sports include alpine skiing, biathlon, cornhole, shooting sports, bass fishing, Esports, golf, marathon canoe, Nordic skiing, snowshoeing, trap shooting and woodsmen.

The Saunders Sports Complex houses the Bobcat Fitness Center, a gymnasium, and dance studio, which is open to the general public for a nominal fee. A 32-foot (9.8 m)-tall climbing wall was opened in the adjacent Buxton Annex gymnasium in 2010.

Timbersports take place in both Fall and Spring semesters, with teams practicing every month of the school year. Events include pole climbing, log birling, chopping, splitting, sawing, pulp toss, ax-throw, and pack-board relay.

The Paul Smith's woodsmen team's nine-year winning streak (from 1957–1966) in the sport's biggest event, the Spring Meet, is the longest in the history of intercollegiate lumberjack/lumberjill competition. The school's squad travels to meets throughout the Northeast and Ontario, Canada. They hosted and won the Spring Meet, the Collegiate TimberSports de facto National Championship in 2024.

Paul Smith's College won the 2024 U.S. Biathlon Collegiate National Championships.

In 2022, the Paul Smith's College Men's Nordic Ski team won the USCSA National Championships located in Lake Placid, NY. The men's team won three out of the four events at the competition.

=== Soccer ===
Both the men and women's soccer teams at Paul Smith's compete in an annual rivalry game with the teams from SUNY College of Environmental Science and Forestry. The winner receives the Barkeater Cup. The PSC men's soccer team won the Cup in 2014. Both the men’s and women’s soccer teams won the Cup in 2024 on their way to qualifying for the USCAA National Tournament - the first time in history that both teams had qualified (the women had qualified for the previous three seasons and reached the national championship game in 2021). Men's and women's team participate in the Yankee Small College Conference regionally, and the USCAA on a national level.

=== Hockey ===
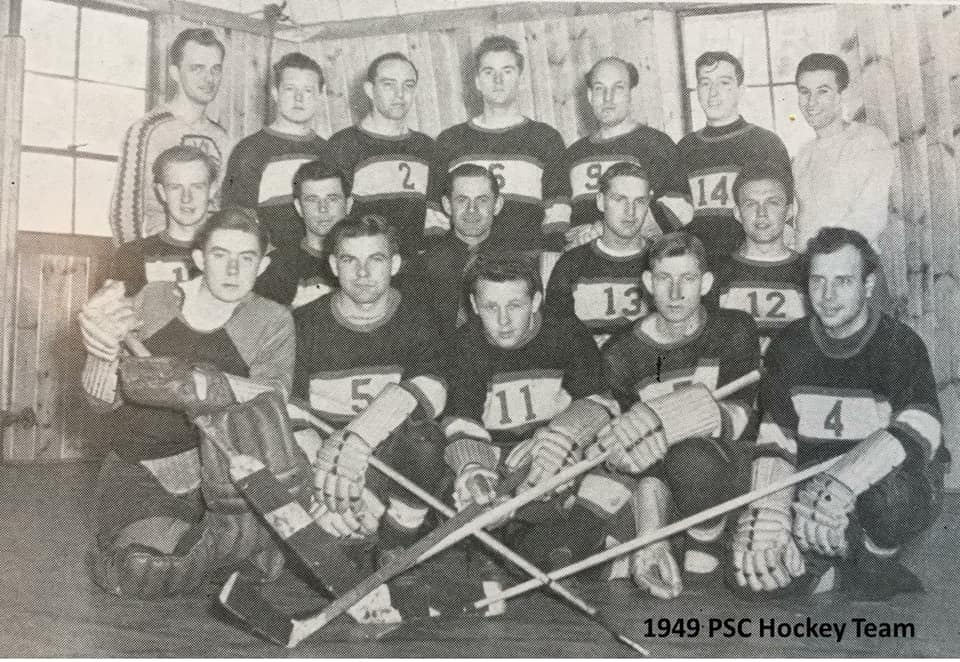
1949 PSC Hockey Team

The earliest hockey team at Paul Smith's was started in 1948 as the "Green and White" , since they were not yet known as the "Bobcats". They took advantage of the harsh Adirondack winters by building a hand-shoveled campus rink on Lower St. Regis Lake where they held additional practices. The team played several games on their home ice at the Lake Placid Arena, long before it would gain international fame during the 1980 Olympic "Miracle on Ice" game.

Hockey continued to grow and evolve at Paul Smith's until the early 2000s when participation seemingly fell off, and the sport was no longer a part of the athletics program.

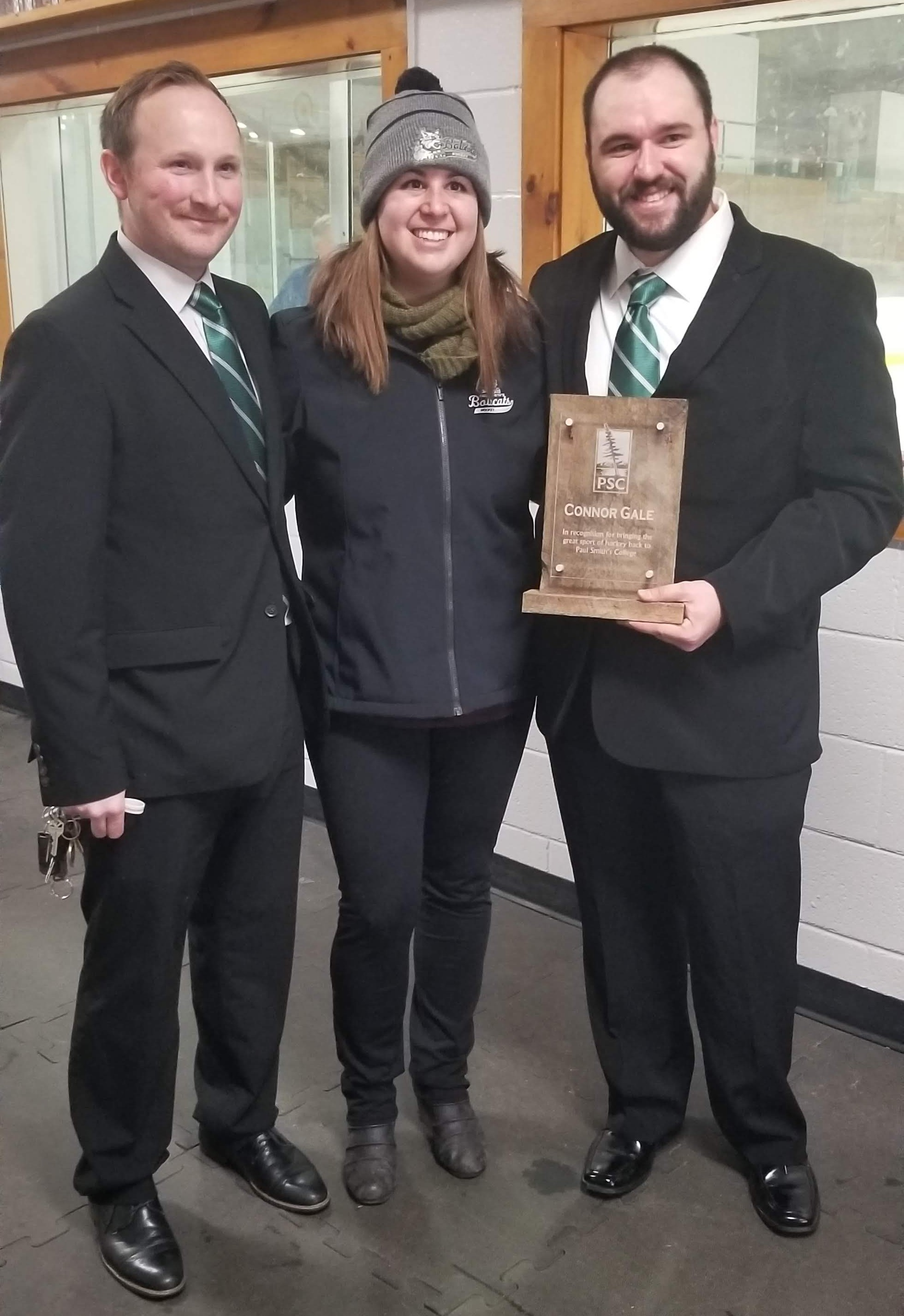
Hockey Club President Connor Gale receives recognition award for his success in bringing hockey back to Paul Smith's College in 2018. Pictured with club advisor Amanda Jones and head coach Casey Gerrish.

In 2017, transfer student Connor Gale took the initiative to bring hockey back to Paul Smith's. When he inquired about the possibility of creating a Hockey Club as a first step, he was met with discouragement due to budgetary concerns and a presumed lack of student interest. Connor's determination held strong and he created an impromptu hockey club sign-up sheet, placed it on the corner of The Wildlife Society’s table at the school's club fair, and by the end of the day it was filled with names.

The Residence Life Coordinator at the time, Amanda Jones, agreed to take on the role of club advisor. Amanda grew up locally and worked as a figure skating coach in Lake Placid; she was a critical supporter of Connor's goal to bring hockey back to PSC. Additionally, the Vice President of Student Affairs at the time, Terry Lindsay, was a key factor in the creation of the club. According to Connor, “He said yes when everyone else said no. He was the guy that went up to bat for me to make this all happen.”

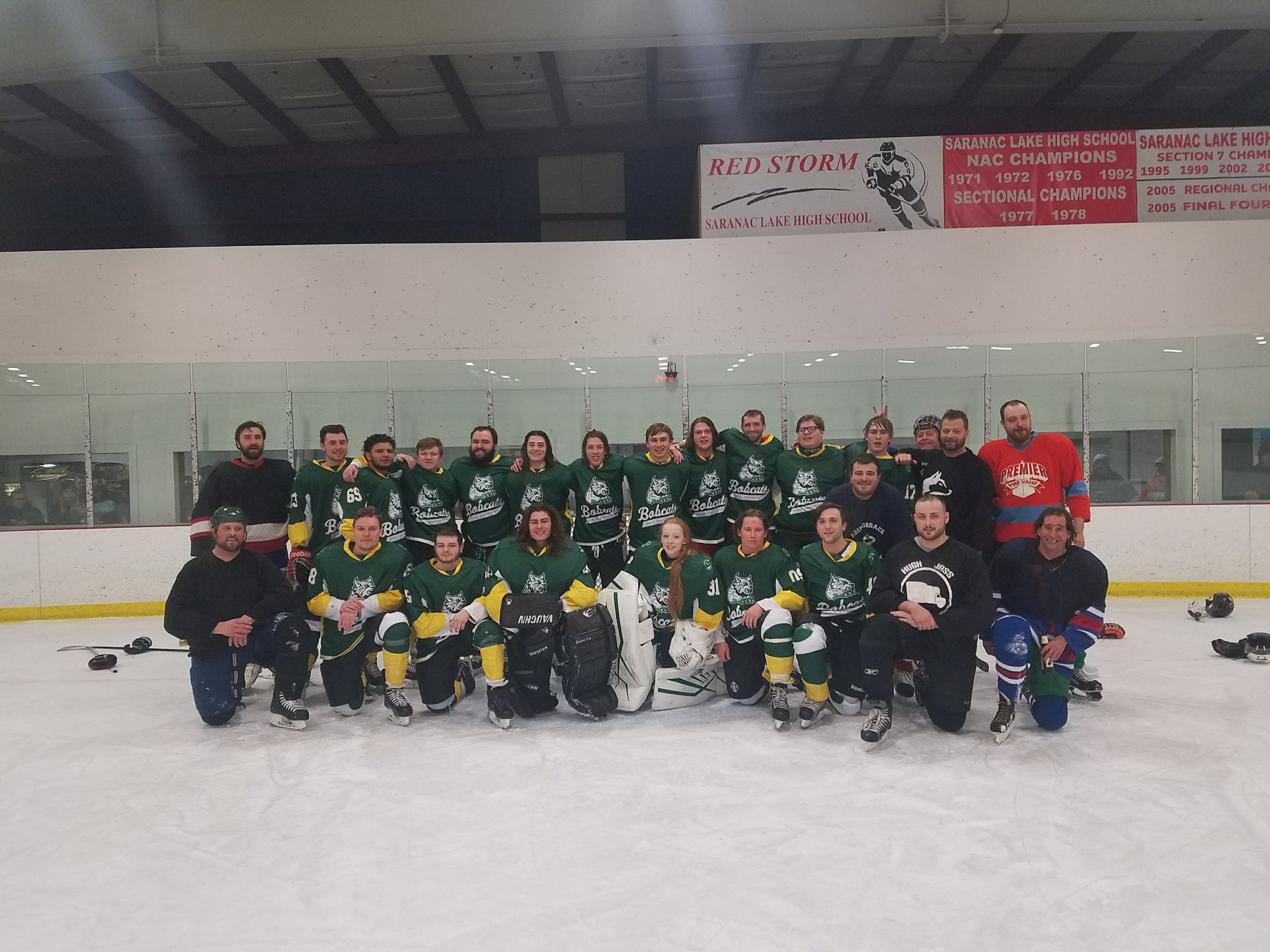
2018 Paul Smith's College Alumni Hockey Game at the Saranac Lake Winter Carnival.

Connor spent the next few months organizing carpools to attend public skates and stick & puck sessions at the Saranac Lake Civic Center, paying out of his own pocket for students who were interested but didn't have the financial means to participate. In February 2018, the new Hockey Club held their first organized game during the Saranac Lake Winter Carnaval against PSC alumni.

By the Fall 2018 semester, the coed club team had 10 games scheduled for the season and officially brought on their first head coach, Casey Gerrish. The inaugural season schedule included a game against SUNY Canton held at the Herb Brooks Arena in Lake Placid; a surreal experience to go from having no hockey team at all to playing where the famous 1980 Miracle on Ice game took place, and of course, the home ice location of the original Paul Smith's hockey team.

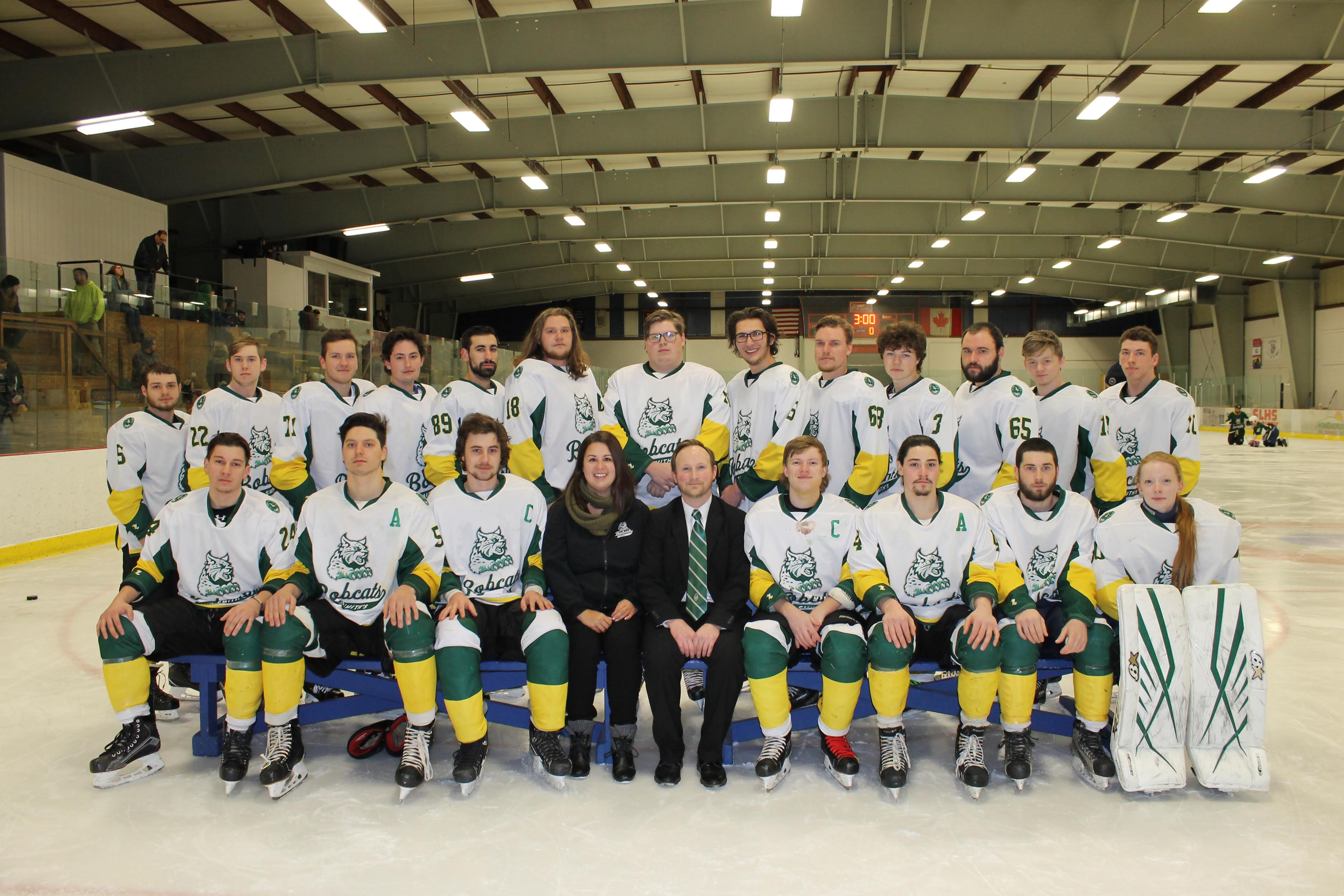
2018 Paul Smith's College Hockey Club Team. The first organized hockey team at Paul Smith's since the early 2000s.

Since the men’s hockey team had its resurgence in 2018, head coach Casey Gerrish has led the team to winning records in the 2023-26 seasons, including their first-ever trip to the AAU College Hockey National Tournament in 2025, and first-ever win at the same national tournament in 2026 when they defeated Penn State Harrisburg 3-2 in Jacksonville, FL. River Yearwood, a member of the Men's Hockey Team during the 2022-24 seasons, was featured in a NHL Color of Hockey blog article published in March 2025

An official women's hockey team was established in 2019 and set the tone when they dominated their first ever game with a 4-Bobcat-hat-trick performance against Mount Holyoke on October 26th.

The Paul Smith’s College women’s hockey team won the inaugural AAU College Hockey Women’s National Championship on March 10, 2024, when they defeated the University of Tampa 4–2 in West Chester, PA. Leah Coulombe was named Tournament MVP.

== Presidents ==
1. Earl C. MacArthur (1942–1945)
2. Frederick G. Leasure (1945–1948)
3. Chester L. Buxton (1948–1976); Gray Twombly (1976; Acting)
4. Thomas Stainback (1976–1982)
5. Harry Millern (1982–1988)
6. H. David Chamberlain (1988–1994)
7. Arthur 'Pete' Linkins (1994–1996); Steven Schneeweiss (1996–1997; Acting)
8. George Miller (1997–2004)
9. John W. Mills (2004–2014)
10. Cathy Dove (2014–2020)
11. Jon Strauss (2020–2021)
12. Scott Dalrymple (2021–2022)
13. Nicholas Hunt-Bull (2022)
14. Dan Kelting (2022–present)

== Notable alumni ==
- Bruce Beyer – Vietnam War resistor
- Christian Cardiello and Eric Munley – members of The Blind Owl Band
- John T. Dillon, Chairman and CEO of International Paper (1996–2003)
- Laura James – model, the winner of America's Next Top Model Cycle 19
- Jon L. Luther – former CEO of Dunkin' Donuts and former President of Popeyes
- John Mitzewich aka Chef John – YouTube celebrity chef
- Steve Ross – CEO of Kinney National Company, Warner Communications and Time Warner
