= Stephen Warren Morehouse =

African American civil war veteran

Stephen Warren Morehouse (ca. 1840–1882) was a wilderness guide, cook, and hotel worker at Apollos “Paul” Smith's Adirondack hotel in northern New York State. He served in the 54th Massachusetts Infantry Regiment, one of the first Black regiments organized during the American Civil War.

== Early life and family ==
Census records for Franklin County, New York indicate that Stephen Warren Morehouse was born in or near Waterford, New York around 1840 to Stephen B. Morehouse and Helen Morehouse (ca. 1810–1890).

In 1847, his father, Stephen B. Morehouse was given 40 acres of land in Franklin County by wealthy abolitionist and philanthropist Gerrit Smith. This was part of a land-distribution project supported by the abolitionist John Brown and funded by Smith. All together, Smith granted 120,000 acres of his Adirondack property to 3000 free Black residents of New York State to help empower them through land ownership and help them to qualify to vote. However, the property given to Morehouse was located in a remote wooded area near Plumadore Pond (Township 9, Lot 280 SW) and was never occupied by the Morehouses.

In 1850, the Town of Franklin census listed the Morehouse family as residing near Loon Lake. In addition to Warren, the household included Stephen B. and Helen Morehouse, their daughter Jane (ca. 1832–1911), and the abolitionist editor Willis Augustus Hodges who had recently established a small, short-lived settlement of African American pioneers called “Blacksville” near the lake. A map of Franklin County published in 1858 placed the Morehouse residence on the northeast side of the main road ca. one half mile east of Loon Lake and a similar distance west of Hunter's Home, a rustic inn operated by the family of Apollos (“Paul”) Smith. However, Town of Franklin tax assessments from the 1850s show that Stephen B. Morehouse owned 11 acres in Lot 183 NW a short distance to the west of the road. No records of Stephen B. Morehouse's presence in the area after ca. 1860 have yet been found, but Helen, Warren, and Jane were residents of Franklin County for the rest of their lives.

== Career ==
=== Paul Smith's Hotel ===
Morehouse guided hunting trips with Apollos Smith in 1859. In 1860, the Brighton census recorded Warren “Morchouse” living with his mother Helen at Paul Smith's Hotel which had recently opened at Lower Saint Regis Lake, 12 miles southwest of Loon Lake. Both were listed as servants. A memoir from a client of the hotel described a camping trip with Paul Smith for which Warren served as cook and hunter. In his own memoir, Rainbow Lake hotelier James Manchester Wardner reported that “Wash” Morehouse was also employed as a cook for summer camping trips from his own hotel.

=== Civil war service ===
In September 1863 Warren Morehouse was in Boston, Massachusetts, where he enlisted in the 54th Massachusetts Regiment Volunteer Infantry soon after its assault on Fort Wagner. Military documents described Warren as 20–21 years old, 5 feet 2 inches tall, and employed as waiter or laborer. Warren mustered in at Morris Island, South Carolina, on October 22, 1863.

In February 1864, the 54th joined a Union army advance from Jacksonville, Florida, toward Tallahassee that encountered unexpectedly strong resistance from Confederate forces on the outskirts of Olustee. According to Luis Fenellosa Emilio, one of the regiment's officers, the 54th was called to battle in late afternoon to rescue the Union troops being overwhelmed by Confederate forces. Soldiers fled past them shouting "you'll all get killed!" Together with another black regiment, the 54th held off confederate forces while the White troops retreated. During the fighting, Emilio noted that "Warren Moorhouse of Company E” crept out ahead of the others as a sharpshooter. When night fell, the 54th withdrew under cover of darkness.

Later on, Warren took part in the Battle of Honey Hill and Potter’s Raid. During Potter's Raid, Emilio mentions Warren's service as a scout during action near Boykin, South Carolina. In August 1865, the regiment mustered out at Mount Pleasant, South Carolina, and in September marched through the streets of Boston to cheering crowds.

A copy of the Massachusetts 54th regimental muster role from 1865, recovered from the National Archives in Washington, DC, lists Warren Morehouse as a regimental marker. Regimental markers form at the ends of the battle line, together with the national colors in the middle of the ranks, the rest of the regiment could form around them. Usually assigned to sergeants, it is unusual that Warren Morehouse was assigned this duty while holding the rank of private.

== Later years and death ==
Upon returning to the Adirondacks, Warren married Charlotte Ann Thomas (1849-1934), daughter of John Thomas Morris, in Brighton, New York, on October 21, 1866, and settled in Vermontville.

The 1870 Franklin census noted that he worked as a “waitingman” at Sarah Hill's inn on the south end of the hamlet, and a map of Vermontville published in 1876 indicated a “W. Morehouse” residence on Swinyer Road.

The 1880 Franklin census listed him as a laborer. According to Franklin County census documents, Charlotte and Warren had four children; Mary Elizabeth (ca. 1870–1948), Henry A. (ca. 1873–1900), John W. (1877–1959), and James (1880–?).

Warren died of dropsy on June 1, 1882, and was buried in Union Cemetery in Vermontville.

Local census and tax assessment documents indicate that his wife Charlotte continued to live at the Swinyer Road property until ca. 1930, when she moved to Corona, Queens, in New York City and lived with their son, James, until her death on April 4, 1934. Descendants of Warren and Charlotte Morehouse have continued to live in the Adirondack region to the present day.

== Honors and legacy ==
The grave of Stephen Warren Morehouse at Union Cemetery, Vermontville, is honored with a Grand Army of the Republic marker. In 2007, a reunion of descendants of Warren and Charlotte Morehouse and other Black settlers of the Adirondacks took place in the Vermontville area. Warren Morehouse's biography was summarized in “Dreaming of Timbuctoo,” a historical exhibit based at the John Brown Farm in North Elba, NY.

In 2024, the dining hall at Paul Smith's College was named in honor of Warren and Helen Morehouse.
