= Cecilia Cassini =

American fashion designer

Cecilia Cassini is an American fashion designer. Cecilia Cassini launched her first collection at just ten years old, earning recognition as the “world’s youngest fashion designer.” Even then, she designed with her client in mind — imagining what she herself wanted to wear: playful, expressive pieces that made her feel confident and seen. Now, at twenty-six, she returns to her brand with that same client-centered philosophy, shaped by her growth as a woman and designer. Inspired by the women she dresses, she creates from a deeply personal place

Cassini was part of a reality show, Fashion Week Trends, 2012.
