= Jon Strauss =

American academic administrator

Jon Calvert Strauss is an American academic administrator who served as a college president at six different institutions: Worcester Polytechnic Institute (1985–1994), Harvey Mudd College (1997–2006), Manhattanville University (2011–2016), acting president of Iona University (2017) and most recently as interim president of Paul Smith's College (2020–2021).

== Education ==
Strauss received his bachelor of arts degree from the University of Wisconsin at Madison, his Master of Arts degree in physics from the University of Pittsburgh, and his PhD in electrical engineering from the Carnegie Institute of Technology, also in Pittsburgh.

== Career ==
Strauss served as the 13th president of Worcester Polytechnic Institute in Worcester, Massachusetts, from 1985 to 1994. He then briefly served as the chief financial officer of the Howard Hughes Medical Institute. Strauss was the 4th president of the Harvey Mudd College in Claremont, California, serving in that position from 1997 to 2006. He served as President of the then Bainbridge Graduate Institute (founded 2002, later became Pinchot University in Seattle, Washington, then acquired by Presidio Graduate School in August 2016, of San Anselmo, California) in 2008–2009.

Dr. Strauss next served as the interim dean of engineering at the Whitacre College of Engineering of the Texas Tech University in Lubbock, Texas. From 2011 to 2016, he served as the 12th President of Manhattanville University in Purchase, New York, replacing Molly Easo Smith. He was acting president of Iona University in the spring of 2017 and interim president of Paul Smith's College from 2020 to 2021.

He is a former member and current consultant of the National Science Board. Strauss has also served as Senior Vice-president of the University of Southern California in Los Angeles, California and subsequently Vice President for Budget and Finance at the University of Pennsylvania in Philadelphia. While at UPenn, he helped to develop the Responsibility Center Management (RCM).

== Personal life ==
He is married to Jean Anne Sacconaghi Strauss, a writer, activist and filmmaker. He has four children: daughters Susan MacQuarrie and Stephanie Annan from his first marriage, and two sons, Kristoffer Calvert Strauss and Jonathon Samuel Louis Strauss and six grandchildren.
