= Jon L. Luther =

American foodservice industry executive

Jon L. Luther is an American foodservice industry executive. He was the chairman and chief executive officer of Dunkin' Brands. Luther is the chairman of the board of the Culinary Institute of America and Arby's Restaurant Group, and a director at Six Flags Entertainment Corporation, Wingstop Restaurants, and Tempur Sealy International.

== Biography ==
From February 1997 until December 2002, Luther was president of Popeyes Chicken & Biscuits, a division of AFC Enterprises. Prior to running Popeyes, Luther was president of CA One Services, a subsidiary of Delaware North Companies, Inc. He has also held leadership positions in the contract food service division of the Marriott Corporation and at Aramark in Philadelphia, where he rose from vending sales director to become president of Davre's, Aramark's luxury restaurant subsidiary. Luther also founded Benchmark Services, a foodservice management company specializing in business dining for corporations, growing the business into a strong regional competitor.

Luther holds a degree in hotel and restaurant management from Paul Smith's College, and honorary doctorate degrees from Bentley College, Canisius College, and Johnson & Wales University.
