= Leila Goldkuhl =

American fashion model (born 1991)

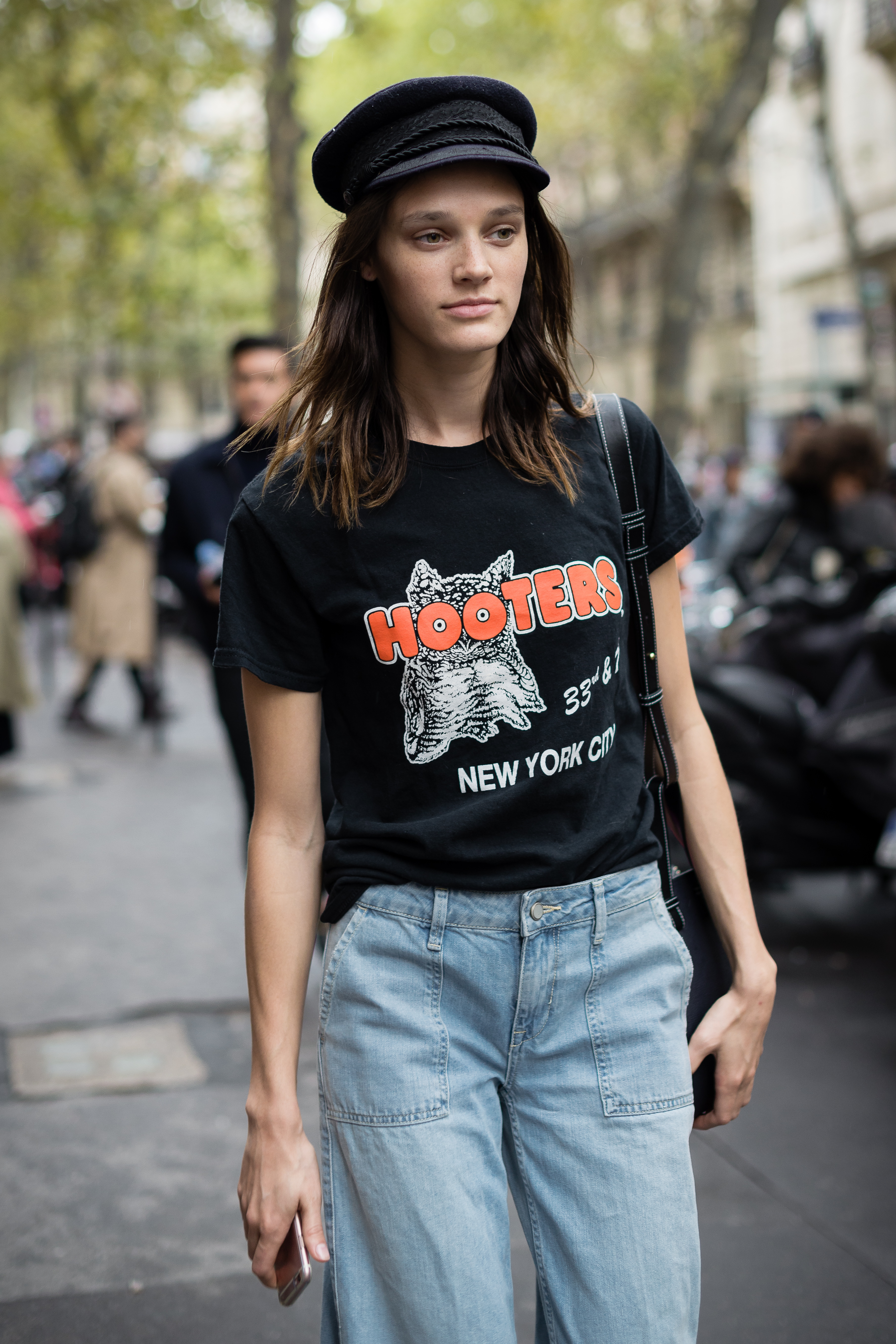
- Goldkuhl during Paris Fashion Week S/S 2018
- Born: Leila Marie Goldkuhl; December 30, 1991 (age 34); Framingham, Massachusetts, U.S.
- Education: Salem State University; University of Rhode Island
- Occupation: Model
- Years active: 2012–present
- Spouse: Robbie Masterson (m. 2017)
- Children: 3
- Modeling information
- Height: 6 ft 0 in (1.83 m)
- Hair color: Dark brown
- Eye color: Hazel
- Agency: Marilyn Agency (New York); Chic Management (Sydney); M4 Models (Hamburg); Next Management (Paris, Milan, Los Angeles) (mother agency)

Leila Marie Goldkuhl Masterson (/ˈliːlə/ LEE-lə; née Goldkuhl; born December 30, 1991) is an American fashion model. She is known for competing on America's Next Top Model, Cycle 19.

== Early life and education ==
Goldkuhl was born on December 30, 1991, in Framingham, Massachusetts. She attended Framingham High School as a teenager, where she played basketball, volleyball, and lacrosse. After graduating from high school in 2010 Goldkuhl attended Salem State University, where she planned to major in marine biology. She later transferred to the University of Rhode Island to study textiles, fashion merchandising and design before deciding to pursue modeling.

== America's Next Top Model ==
Goldkuhl's first attempt to join America's Next Top Model was made during the show's casting for cycle 15, when she auditioned in New York and was optioned as a top 32 contestant on Tyra.com, but was not selected to proceed further. Contestants Jane Randall and Kendal Brown, both of whom ultimately made the final cast that cycle, were chosen as the winners of this search.

Goldkuhl was eventually selected as a top 20 contestant for the show's nineteenth cycle in 2012, where she was chosen as one of the top thirteen contestants. She was originally eliminated in the fifth week of the competition, but the series had introduced a twist involving the newly implemented public vote, which allowed previously eliminated contestants to continue having their photos scored after their elimination. The highest scoring contestant, later revealed to be Goldkuhl, was allowed to rejoin the competition in week 9. She was the last contestant eliminated overall.

== Modeling career ==
In 2013, Goldkuhl was signed with Next Model Management in Los Angeles. She began working locally before traveling abroad to model in Australia and South Korea. She was later signed worldwide under representation from Next Model Management, and had her runway debut as a worldwide exclusive for Givenchy during the S/S 16 season in September 2015. She was subsequently featured in the brand's advertising campaign for that season. In addition to her work for Givenchy, Goldkuhl has done campaigns for Tom Ford, Alexander McQueen, Dolce & Gabbana, Elie Saab, Hervé Léger, Hugo Boss, Just Cavalli, Saks Fifth Avenue, Urban Outfitters, Vera Wang, Nordstrom, Zara, Prada, and Calvin Klein.

Since her runway debut in 2015, Goldkuhl has walked for several other designers during Fashion Week in New York, London, Milan and Paris, including Alexander McQueen, Alexandre Vauthier, Alberta Ferretti, Balmain, Chanel, Fendi, Dolce & Gabbana, Elie Saab, Emanuel Ungaro, Emilio Pucci, Lanvin, Isabel Marant, Hermès, Jean Paul Gaultier, Giambattista Valli, Marc Jacobs, Moschino, Nina Ricci, Oscar de la Renta, Prada, Roberto Cavalli, Salvatore Ferragamo, Shiatzy Chen, Valentino, Vera Wang, Versace and Zuhair Murad. She has also been featured in editorials for publications like Harper's Bazaar, Marie Claire, Numéro, Oyster, Russh, V, W, and American, Italian, Korean, German, Australian and Mexican editions of Vogue.

In October 2015, Goldkuhl was ranked by Cosmopolitan as one of the most successful contestants of the Top Model franchise. In 2018, she was ranked among the top 50 working models in the fashion industry by Models.com.

== Personal life ==
Goldkuhl married photographer Robbie Masterson on October 14, 2017. The couple have three children together.
